= Fauna of New Guinea =

Native animals of New Guinea

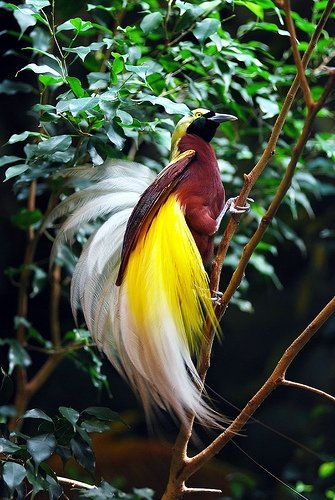
Greater bird-of-paradise

The fauna of New Guinea comprises a large number of species of mammals, reptiles, birds, fish, invertebrates and amphibians.

As the world's largest and highest tropical island, New Guinea occupies less than 0.5% of world's land surface, yet supports a high percentage of global biodiversity. Approximately 4,624 vertebrate species inhabit the island of New Guinea and its surrounding waters, which constitutes about 8% of the recognized world vertebrates. This ranges from an estimated 4% of the world's lizards and mammals, to about 10% of the world's fish species.

The numbers of global and New Guinea invertebrate species are poorly known, and thus an accurate comparison is difficult. Butterflies are the best known invertebrate group, and are represented in New Guinea by about 735 species, which is about 4.2% of the world total of 17,500 species.

Nevertheless, despite the rich biodiversity, New Guinea's megafauna diversity is quite low since the Pleistocene extinction event, especially when it comes to apex predators. For example, there are only three terrestrial animals at the top of the food chain. Of the three, two are obligate carnivores, the crocodile monitor and the New Guinea singing dog, whilst one, the cassowary, is actually a frugivore but predatory opportunistically and seasonally. In the air, the only endemic apex predator is the New Guinea harpy eagle, whilst in the riverine systems, there are only two, the saltwater crocodile and the smaller New Guinea crocodile.

== Origin ==
=== History ===
Papua New Guinea is a large island located north of Australia, and south-east of Asia. It is part of the Australian Plate, known as Sahul, and once formed part of the supercontinent Gondwana. The origin of most New Guinea fauna is closely linked to Australia. Gondwana began to break up 140 million years ago, and Sahul separated from Antarctica 50 million years ago. As it drifted north, New Guinea moved into the tropics.

Throughout Papua New Guinea's geological history there have been many land connections with Australia. These have occurred during glaciations in various ice ages. Four occurred during the Pleistocene, the last of which was severed 10,000 years ago. At this time, a number of species existed on both land masses, and many plants and animals thus crossed from Australia to Papua New Guinea and vice versa. Many later became isolated as the connection ended, then further adapted to the new environment and became distinct species.

However, this Australia–Papua New Guinea mixing occurred among a relatively few faunal groups; some Papua New Guinea species have an Asian origin. As Papua New Guinea drifted north, it collided with the Pacific Plate as well as a number of oceanic islands. Although no land connection with Asia was ever formed (see Wallace line), the proximity between the land masses, via the many small islands of the Indonesian archipelago, allowed some Asian species to migrate to Papua New Guinea. This has resulted in a unique mixture of Australian and Asian species, seen nowhere else in the world. A large percentage of Papua New Guinea's species are endemic to the island.

== History of study ==
Influential evolutionary biologist Ernst Mayr came to New Guinea (Papua New Guinea ) in 1928 to make collections for the American Museum of Natural History and banker and naturalist Walter Rothschild. Mayr collected several thousand bird skins (he named 26 new bird species during his lifetime) and, in the process, also named 38 new orchid species. He determined that New Guinea's rarest birds-of-paradise were, in fact, hybrid species. During his stay in New Guinea, he was invited to accompany the Whitney South Seas Expedition to the Solomon Islands. Mayr's experience of the fauna of New Guinea informed many of his conclusions about evolution for the rest of his life.

== Mammals ==
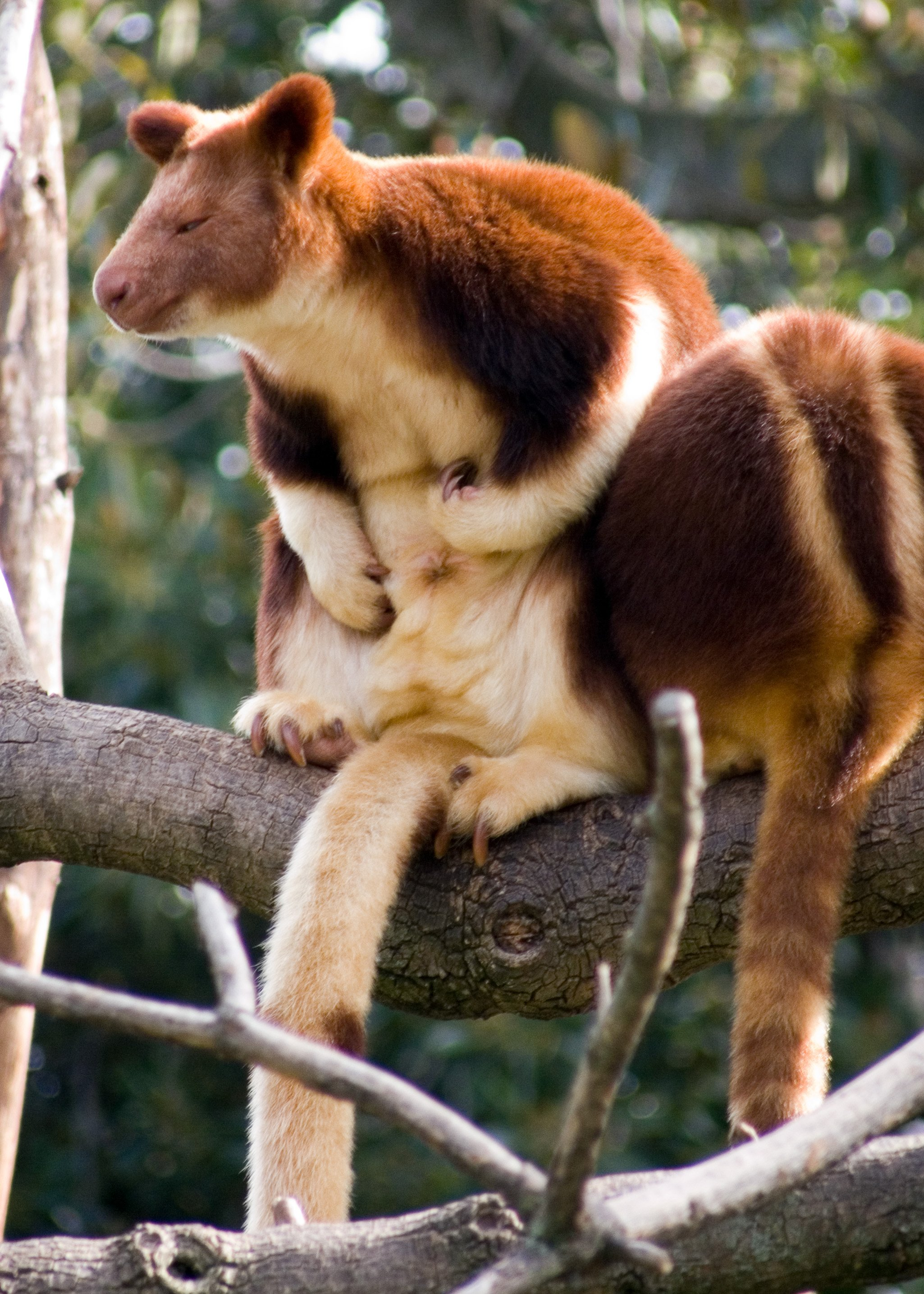
Goodfellow's tree-kangaroo (Dendrolagus goodfellowi)

The mammal fauna of New Guinea is composed of all extant subclasses of mammal: the monotremes, placentals and marsupials. New Guinea contains the largest number of monotreme species of any land mass, with only one species absent: the platypus (Ornithorhynchus anatinus). The marsupial fauna of New Guinea is diverse, consisting of the three orders: Dasyuromorphia, Peramelemorphia and Diprotodontia.

The native placental mammals are solely represented by the rodents and bats. There are approximately the same number of placental species as marsupials and monotremes.

=== Monotremes and marsupials ===
New Guinea's monotremes are restricted to the family Tachyglossidae, also known as echidnas. There are four species of echidnas in two genera: the short-beaked echidna (Tachyglossus aculeatus), the eastern long-beaked echidna (Zaglossus bartoni), the western long-beaked echidna (Zaglossus bruijni) and Sir David's long-beaked echidna (Zaglossus attenboroughi). No living Zaglossus have been seen in Australia, in recent years, and this genus may now be endemic to New Guinea, although a specimen in the natural history museum was collected from the Kimberley region in the early 20th century and fossils have been found in Australia.

The native mammal fauna of New Guinea lacks large predators. The carnivorous marsupials, Dasyuromorphia, of New Guinea are all small in comparison to Australian species, and most are insectivorous. The largest is the bronze quoll (Dasyurus spartacus), a rare quoll, first discovered in southern New Guinea in 1979. It reaches a snout to vent length of 36 centimetres (14.2 in). Fossils of larger marsupials have been found, including the carnivorous thylacine (Thylacinus sp.), however evidence of carnivorous megafauna, such as the marsupial lion (Thylacoleo), has not been found.

The kangaroos, Macropodidae, of New Guinea are highly varied in their ecology and behaviour. Those closely related to the Australian kangaroos, such as the agile wallaby (Macropus agilis), inhabit the open grasslands of New Guinea. However, the tree-kangaroos, which are mostly endemic to New Guinea, are different in appearance and behaviour. As suggested by their name, they are arboreal. They have long, thick tails which enable them to balance in trees, and large, strong forearms for gripping to trees. Two species of tree kangaroos are also found in Australia. They are believed to have migrated from New Guinea during the Pleistocene.

The cuscus, family Phalangeridae, are a family of marsupials closely related to the possums of Australia. The cuscus have evolved in New Guinea, and are found throughout the island. Most species are dark brown or black, however two species, the common spotted cuscus (Spilocuscus maculatus) and black spotted cuscus (Spilocuscus rufoniger), are black, orange and yellow.

Many small, herbivorous possum species are native to New Guinea. These include the families: Acrobatidae, Burramyidae, Petauridae and Pseudocheiridae. Krefft's glider (Petaurus notatus) is one of only two New Guinea possums that are able to glide. It has large flaps of skin between its legs, which it spreads whilst in the air. Three sub-species are found in New Guinea, and they inhabit the entire island.

=== Placental mammals ===
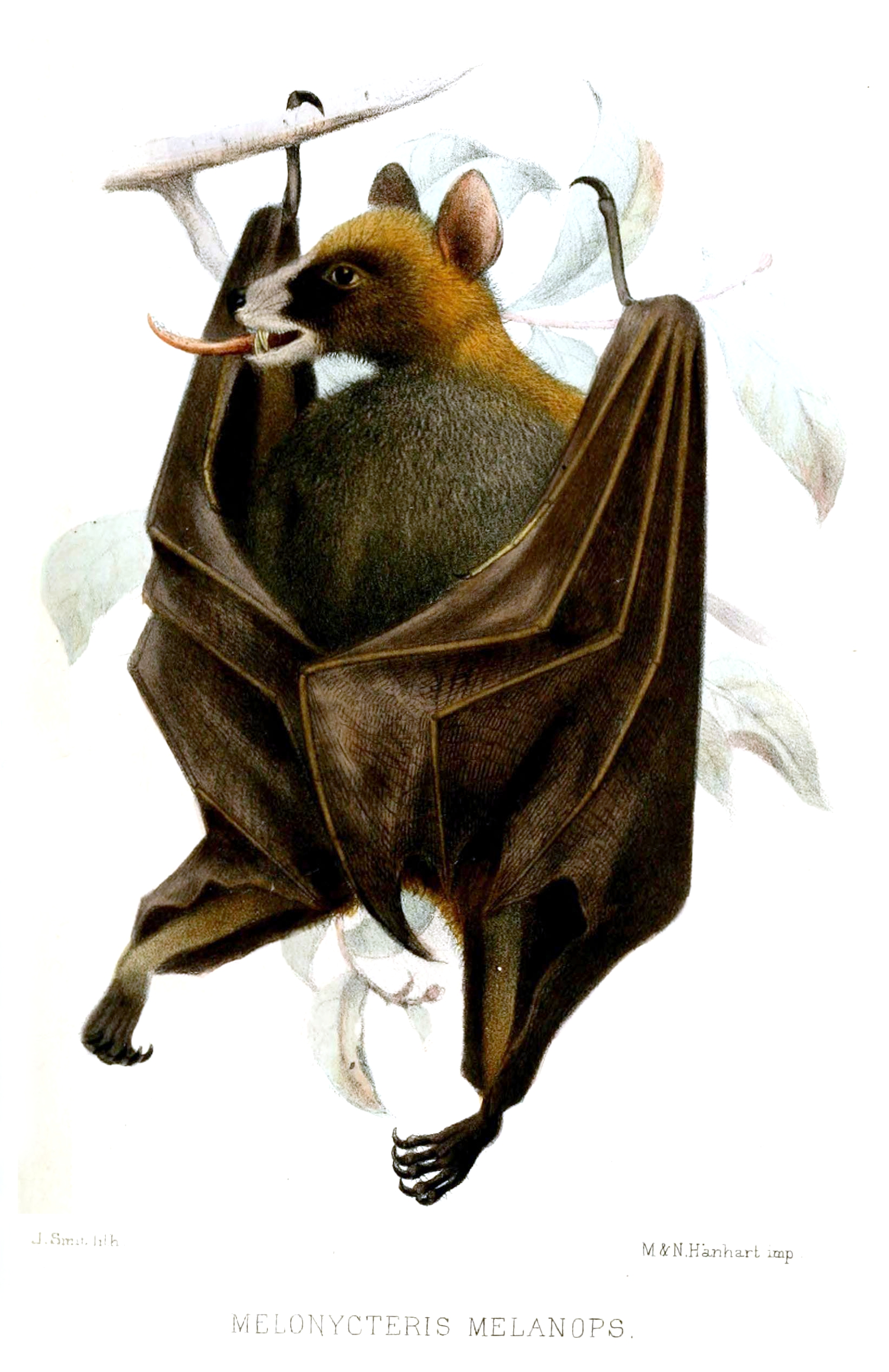
The black-bellied fruit bat is native to the Bismarck Archipelago of Papua New Guinea.

The rodents are solely represented by the family Muridae, and within this family, 29 genera are native to New Guinea. They are believed to have migrated to New Guinea during two periods. The first group, called the old endemics, form part of an ancient clade including other old endemics from Australia and the Philippines and likely migrated to New Guinea during the Late Miocene or Early Pliocene. The second group includes a number of species of the genus Rattus. These are believed to have moved to New Guinea later. Most New Guinea species form a monophyletic group with some Moluccan species, which is most closely related to the Australian group (one species of which also occurs on New Guinea) and to the R. xanthurus group of Sulawesi.

The old endemics have undergone an adaptive radiation, which produced such distinctive forms as the small, shrew-like Pseudohydromys, the amphibious Hydromys, tree mice of the genus Chiruromys, and several genera of giant rats, of which Mallomys is the largest. This genus contains the largest rat found in New Guinea, the grey black-eared giant rat (Mallomys aroaensis); males can reach a length of 41 centimetres (16.1 in) from snout to vent.

The bats of New Guinea are a very diverse group, comprising six families, and 29 genera. The six families are: Pteropodidae, Emballonuridae, Hipposideridae, Rhinolophidae, Vespertilionidae and Molossidae. Bats migrated to New Guinea on many occasions, with many species being shared with Australia, the Sunda Islands and even mainland Asia. The megabats, or Megachiropterans, of New Guinea are highly adapted, and many are endemic to New Guinea and surrounding islands. While most megabats are herbivorous, and eat fruit, nectar and flowers, some species within New Guinea have adapted to also eat insects whilst in flight; an ecological niche usually filled by microbats. Some species also forage on the ground, an adaptation not seen in areas with large predators.

The microbats show much less endemism than the megabats. Only one genus and a few species are endemic to New Guinea and surrounding islands; this suggests a much later migration to New Guinea.

The colonisation of New Guinea by humans (Homo sapiens) occurred at least 40,000 years ago. Since their original colonisation, many mammals have been introduced, both by accident and on purpose. The wild boar (Sus scrofa) was introduced to New Guinea at least 6,000 years ago, though may have been introduced 12,000 years ago. It is abundant throughout the island, and more common in areas where humans grow sweet potato as their primary food source. The wild boar is a large forager, and disturbs the forest floor whilst looking for food. This disturbance may have an effect on the native flora and fauna.

The domestic dog (Canis familiaris) was introduced to New Guinea about 2,000 years ago. There is also an endemic wild dog, the New Guinea singing dog, Canis lupus hallstromi, that is closely related to the Australian dingo. It arrived on the island at least 6,000 years ago. Its common name comes from the way these dogs harmonize during chorus howls. The New Guinea singing dogs live in the remote mountains, above human habitation level, and whilst cassowaries still remain the island's largest opportunistic terrestrial predator by technicality, the singing dogs are New Guinea's largest obligate full-time land predator ecosystem-wise.

Many murid species have been introduced to New Guinea. These include: the Polynesian rat (Rattus exulans), the Himalayan field rat (Rattus nitidus), the black rat (Rattus rattus), the ricefield rat (Rattus argentiventer), the brown rat (Rattus norvegicus) and the house mouse (Mus musculus). Most of these have not caused much damage, and most have only established in human settlements. R. nitidus and R. argentiventer have very limited distributions on the island. The house mouse is the most widespread of the introduced murids, and is found in settlements and grassland. It is the only introduced murid to reach the central region of Telefomin.

Three species of deer have been introduced to New Guinea. The rusa deer (Cervus timorensis) is the most common, and well established. It is found throughout the north and south of New Guinea. It is commonly hunted for meat by humans. The other two species, the chital (Axis axis) and the fallow deer (Dama dama) are much rarer, and the fallow deer may be extinct on the island.

The cat (Felis catus) is common around human settlements, but is rare in the forested regions of New Guinea. In areas where it has established, native animal populations have dramatically decreased.

One bovine species has been introduced to New Guinea. The Domestic water buffalo (Bubalus bubalis) is found in swamps, is a rare species to find across the island. It is commonly hunted for meat and sport.

== Birds ==
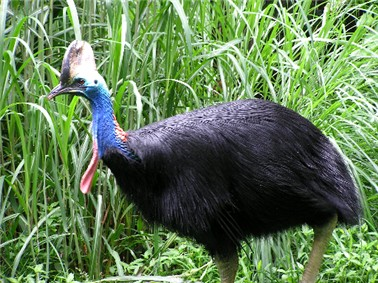
The southern cassowary (Casuarius casuarius)

New Guinea shares a distinction with New Zealand, in which birds form the most dominant lifeforms within its ecosystem. New Guinea has a rich biodiversity of avian life, with over 79 families and approximately 730 species that can be classified into four groups: breeding land and freshwater species, seabirds, migratory birds from the north, and migrants and vagrants from the south-southeast (Australia, New Zealand, and Oceania). There are eight Endemic Bird Areas in New Guinea, with about 320 endemic bird species in the country.

The largest bird in New Guinea is the flightless cassowary, of which all three species are native to New Guinea. Two of these species, the southern cassowary (Casuarius casuarius) and the northern cassowary (Casuarius unappendiculatus), reach heights of 1.8 metres (6 ft). The southern cassowary is also native to the tropical regions of Northern Australia. These birds dominate the jungles and coasts of New Guinea, with adults fearing no enemies as—outside of humans—not even crocodiles are known to attack them. The cassowary is one of the world's most dangerous birds, for it is capable of inflicting fatal kicking-injuries with its powerful legs, and the dagger-like claw on its inner toe. It is known to have killed several humans who have gotten too close, and is especially dangerous when chicks are nearby.

Additionally, New Guinea's second-largest terrestrial bird is the neighbouring Australian bustard that is only found in the southern portions of the island.

New Guinea's top avian obligate predator is the New Guinea harpy eagle (Harpyopsis novaeguineae), the only eagle known to hunt its prey on the ground. Another apex avian predator is the aforementioned cassowary; despite its frugivorous nature, this bird's large size, lack of natural enemies and recorded hunting behaviour paradoxically puts this primary consumers at the top of the food chain as well. New Guinea, the Amazon rainforest, the Philippines, and New Zealand all share the distinction of having a bird as dominant top predator.

The pigeons and parrots are well-represented in New Guinea. These groups have achieved their greatest evolutionary diversity in New Guinea, for the island is abundant in fruits and nectar-producing plants. The parrots of New Guinea, as with Australia, are very diverse, with 46 species (one-seventh of the world's total). The 45 species of pigeons, including the three crowned-pigeons (the largest pigeons in the world) are one-sixth of the world's total.

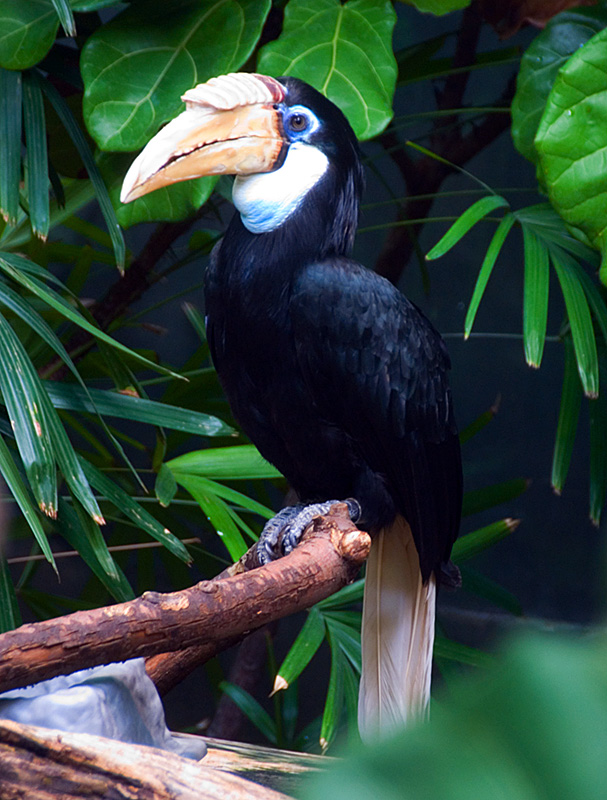
A Papuan hornbill (Rhyticeros plicatus), the only species of hornbill native to New Guinea

The passerines display the greatest amount of diversity, with over 33 families in the country. The passerines of New Guinea are mostly small, often colourful, birds which mostly inhabit the forested regions. The best-known endemic family to New Guinea is the Paradisaeidae, or birds-of-paradise, one of three bird families referred to (collectively) by the same name. Many species show extravagant sexual dimorphism. The males tend to be ornamented with bright, iridescent colours, and modified, ornamental feathers such as tufts and wattles. Many of them can change their physical appearance drastically when they display during mating rituals, in which each species has its own elaborate movements, habits and calls, all to attract females. Some species do not show this sexual dimorphism; both male and female can have or lack ornamentation.

Closely related to the birds-of-paradise are the bowerbirds, a group of 20 rather drab, stocky and short-plumed birds found in New Guinea and Australia. They lack the bright and iridescent color and ornamental plumes found in the birds-of-paradise, but what they lack visually is compensated for with the male's architectural skill. The male builds and decorates an elaborate "bower", ranging from mats, stick towers, avenued chambers to tipi-roofed huts and displays it to the females. These birds are also famed for their mimicking abilities, as they are able to replicate nearly every sound they hear, and they incorporate these sounds into their own songs to attract a mate. Not only can bowerbirds mimic most other bird calls, but their repertoire includes other animals and humans, as well as human technology, such as automobiles, construction equipment, and airplanes.

Another odd avifauna from New Guinea is the poisonous birds, notably the hooded pitohui. In 1989, scientists discovered that the hooded pitohui is poisonous. Later, they learned that the feathers and other organs of the pitohui were found to contain batrachotoxin. Since then, six other songbirds in New Guinea have been found to possess the same toxin in varying amounts. This has been attributed to the specific species of beetles and insects the birds consume, which themselves contain batrachotoxin, thus "instilling" it in the birds that eat them. A similar phenomenon occurs in the African spur-winged goose (due to its choice of insect prey rendering its meat poisonous), as well as the poison dart frogs of Central and South America, named as such due to their diet formic acid-containing ants. However, in captivity, most such animals lose this toxicity when fed a diet of non-toxic insects (crickets, fruit flies, etc).

Most coastal birds and seabirds native to New Guinea are found throughout the tropics.

Although some species are hunted for meat, valuable plumes and feathers, or for the pet trade, the main threats to most species come from logging and conversion of forest for agriculture, both of which degrade or eliminate important habitat.

== Amphibians ==
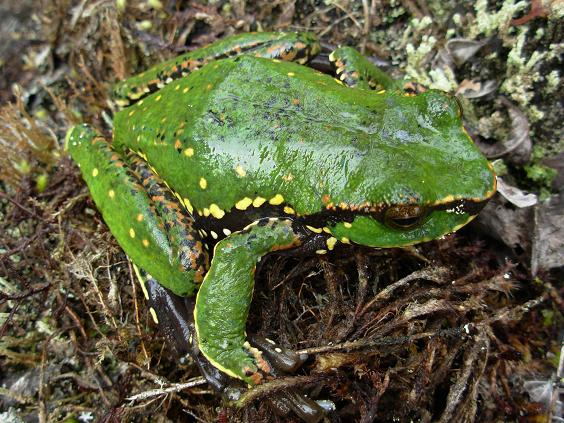
The angiana tree frog (Litoria angiana), common to the highlands of New Guinea

The amphibians of New Guinea consist of a highly diverse group of species, with over 320 described species, and many species still to be described. The amphibians of New Guinea, like most Gondwanan continents, are restricted to those of the order Anura, known as frogs and toads. There are six families represented in New Guinea. Four of these: Myobatrachidae, Hylidae, Ranidae and Microhylidae are native. Two specimens of Rhacophoridae, a family well represented in Asia, were discovered in 1926. They were thought to be introduced by humans, and to have become extinct on the island. The other family, Bufonidae, is only represented by two species: the cane toad (Rhinella marina) and the Asian common toad (Duttaphrynus melanostictus). The cane toad was introduced from Australia in 1937 to control hawk moth larvae, which were eating sweet potato crops; they have since become common in non-forested areas. The common Asiatic toad was accidentally introduced, and is very abundant in a small area in the north-west, and may be spreading further throughout the island.

Frogs from the family Myobatrachidae are highly diverse and widespread in Australia. However, only seven described species have established in New Guinea. In Australia, the largest diversity is seen in the subtropical and semi-arid environments, with the greatest diversity in the tropics occurring in savannah. New Guinea, however, is mostly covered in dense rainforest. The most common myobatrachid in New Guinea is the Wokan cannibal frog (Lechriodus melanopyga). It is a small ground-dwelling frog found throughout New Guinea. Lechriodus is the only myobatrachid genus with greater diversity in New Guinea than Australia. Excluding Lechriodus, the rest of the myobatrachids are mostly restricted to savannah in the southern Fly and Digul River plains.

Tree frogs, of the family Hylidae, have successfully inhabited New Guinea. They are the most diverse family of frogs in New Guinea with over 100 species, and many more to be described. There are two genera represented in New Guinea, Litoria and Nyctimystes. Litoria are found throughout both Australia and New Guinea, however, only one of the 24 species of Nyctimystes has reached Australia. Nyctimystes are arboreal frogs, which lay their eggs in fast flowing streams, behind a rock to avoid it being flushed away. The tadpoles have modified mouths, which use suction to stick to rocks.

Ranidae, also known as true frogs, are the most widely distributed family of frogs on earth, however, they are not well represented in Australia or New Guinea. New Guinea and Australia have been absent of Ranids for most of their history, however since the continent's collision with Asia, species have begun to move across. The Ranids in New Guinea are only represented with one genus, Rana.

Although the origins of Microhylidae in New Guinea are very similar to the Ranids, there is much more diversity. The Microhylids are represented by twelve genera in New Guinea, four of which are endemic.

== Reptiles ==
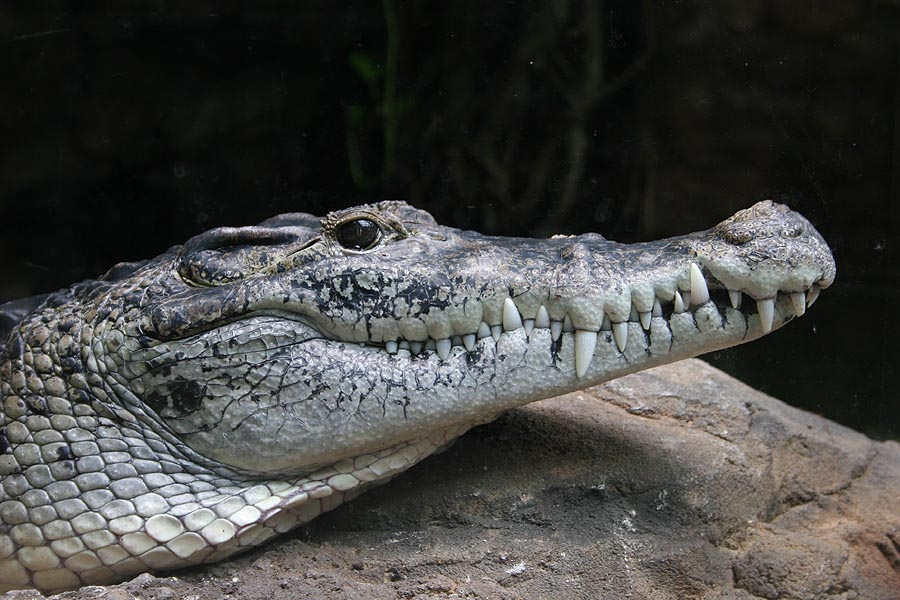
The New Guinea crocodile

The reptile fauna of New Guinea is represented by three of the four extant orders. The squamates, also known as the snakes and lizards, represent the largest group, with approximately 300 described species. The remaining two groups: testudines, or turtles and tortoises, and Crocodilia, the crocodiles, are much less diverse. The turtles are represented by thirteen described species, and the crocodiles two.

The lizards of New Guinea are represented by approximately 200 described species. Of these, a majority are skinks with a smaller number of geckos and agamids. The largest lizard is the crocodile monitor. The snakes, approximately 100 described species, show a much lower rate of endemism than most of New Guinea's fauna.

The turtles of New Guinea are almost equally represented by fresh water turtles as marine. Six species of New Guinea's turtles are marine, and all are found on other land masses. The fresh water turtles are represented by seven species, with three endemic to New Guinea. One species, Parker's snake-necked turtle (Chelodina parkeri), is restricted to the Fly River.

The saltwater crocodile (Crocodylus porosus) is the largest reptile native to New Guinea. It is a widely distributed species, from eastern India to northern Australia. It is found in most of New Guinea's rivers, except for those heavily disturbed by humans, or too small to accommodate the species. The other crocodile native to New Guinea, the New Guinea crocodile (Crocodylus novaeguineae), is an endemic. It is much smaller than the saltwater crocodile. A separate species may occur in southern New Guinea.

== Fish ==
=== Marine ===
New Guinea is within the Coral Triangle, the most species rich marine region in the world. In addition to more than 600 species of corals (about 76% of the total in the world), there are more than 2200 species of reef fishes (about 37% of the total in the world).

=== Freshwater ===
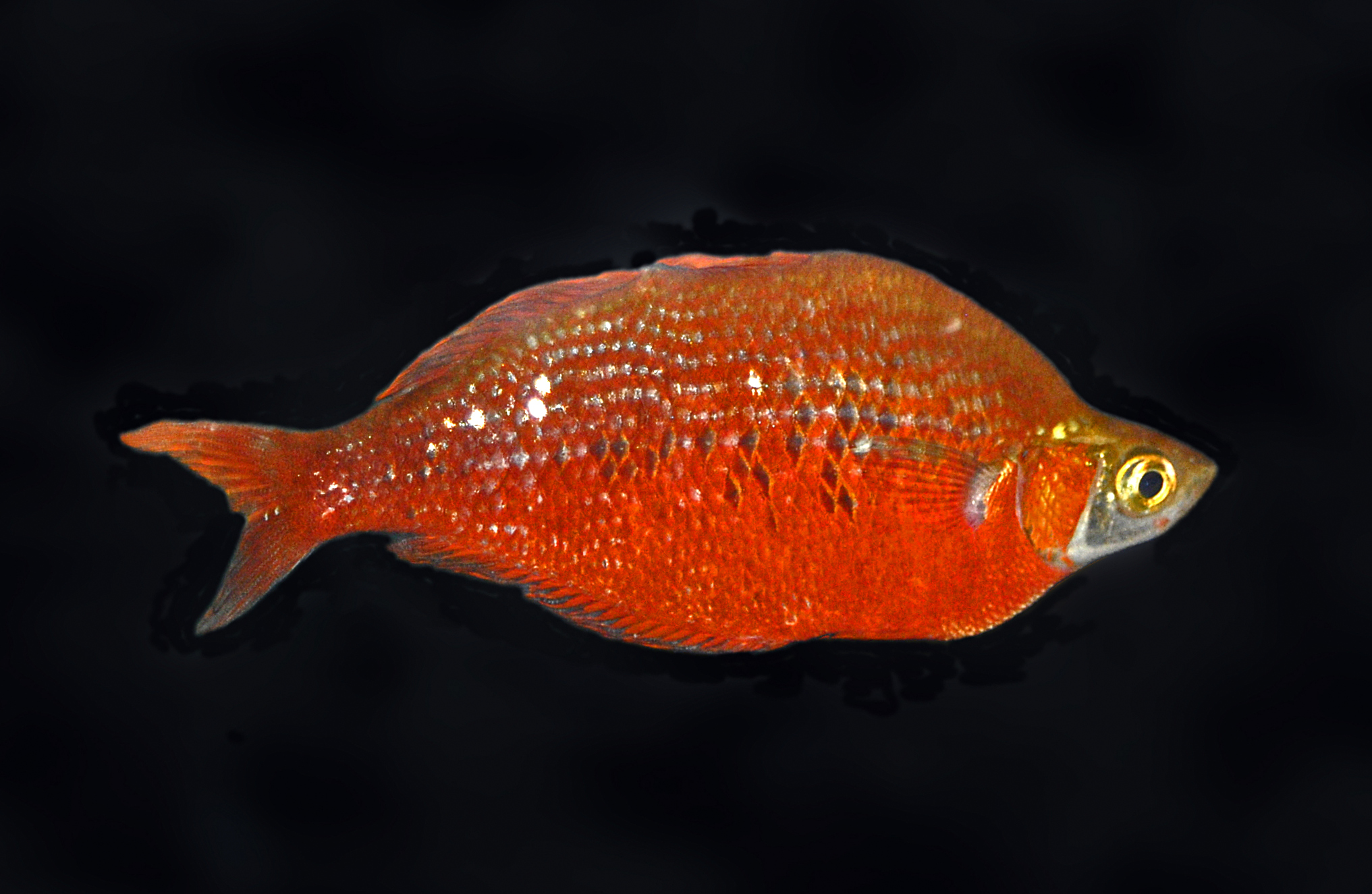
The center of rainbowfish diversity is in New Guinea, but several of these are threatened, including Glossolepis incisus (shown).

As of 2007, about 375 species of fishes are known from freshwater habitats in New Guinea. Of these, 217 are strictly freshwater and 149 are endemic to New Guinea. In general, there is a strong connection in the fauna of New Guinea and Australia, and 33 freshwater fish species from New Guinea are also found in northern Australia. The most speciose families in New Guinea are the rainbowfish, blue-eyes, gudgeons and gobies, but there are also several species of Old World silverside, grunters, glassfish, ariid catfish, eeltail catfish and more.

The complex geography of New Guinea has isolated many populations, resulting in endemics. A striking example of a biogeographic border for freshwater fauna are the New Guinea Highlands, and the species diversity is higher south of the chain than north of it. Among strict freshwater fish, only two species (Chilatherina campsi and Oxyeleotris fimbriata) are found both north and south of these highlands.

There are several large river systems in New Guinea, including the Fly, Sepik and Mamberamo, which all are rich in fishes. The Fly River Basin, the most species rich river of the island, has 105 fish species, while the Sepik River Basin has 57 species. Among New Guinea's lake systems, the most important in terms of endemic fishes are Kutubu (13 endemics), Ajamaru (4 endemics), and Sentani (4 endemics). The gudgeons Oxyeleotris caeca from the upper Kikori River system in Papua New Guinea and O. colasi from the Lengguru area in Western New Guinea are the only described species of cave-adapted fish from the island.

Introduced species and pollution presents a serious problem to some freshwater regions in New Guinea. For example, Lake Sentani (near Jayapura city) and Lake Wanam (near Lae city) have four and one endemic fish species respectively, but these are now seriously threatened. Tailings from mines has also polluted several rivers, including the Porgera River (Porgera Gold Mine), Strickland River (Porgera Gold Mine), Auga River (Tolukuma Mine), Ok Tedi River (Ok Tedi Mine), Fly River (Porgera Gold Mine and Ok Tedi Mine), Otomina River (Grasberg mine) and Ajkwa River (Grasberg mine). The Ok Tedi and Grasberg mines alone account for more than half the yearly tailings dumped into water by major mining operations worldwide.

== Freshwater crustaceans ==
There are freshwater crabs and freshwater shrimps in New Guinea, but generally these are poorly known and often they have not yet been evaluated taxonomically. As of 2007, 17 species of Caridina, 22 species of Macrobrachium and 6 species of Holthuisana (formerly included in Austrothelphusa) are known from New Guinea. Other crustacean genera known from New Guinea freshwater are Atya (2 species) and Palaemon (2) shrimps, and Geelvinkia (3), Halicarcinus (1), Pseudograpsus (1), Ptychognathus (1), Rouxana (5) and Varuna (1) crabs.

There are more than 20 species of Parastacid crayfish of the genus Cherax in New Guinea. With eight endemics, by far the greatest diversity is found in the Paniai Lakes.

== Insects ==
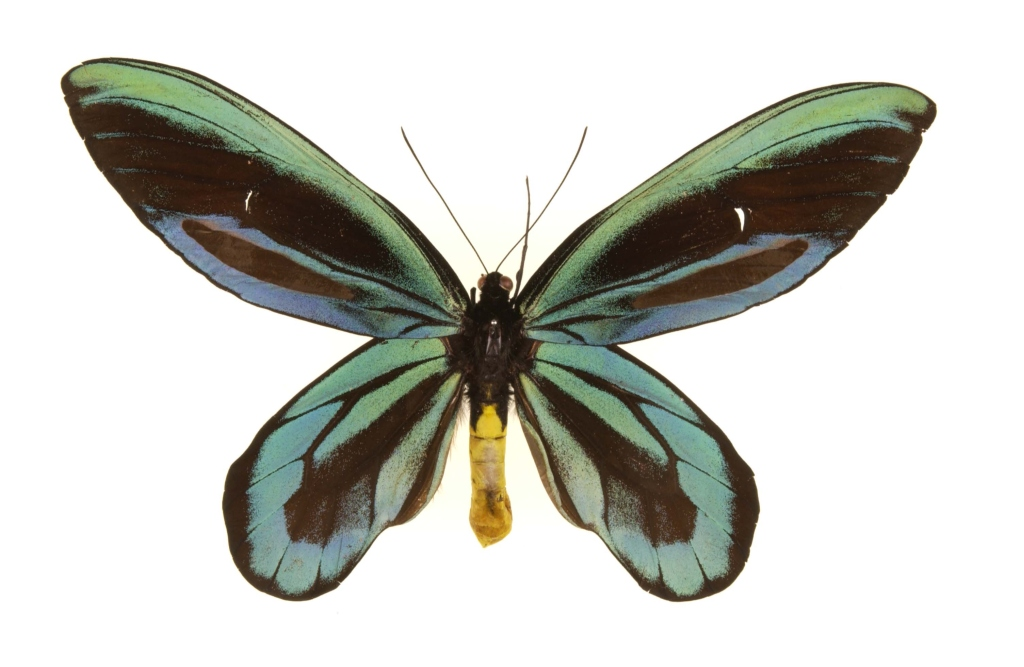
Ornithoptera alexandrae

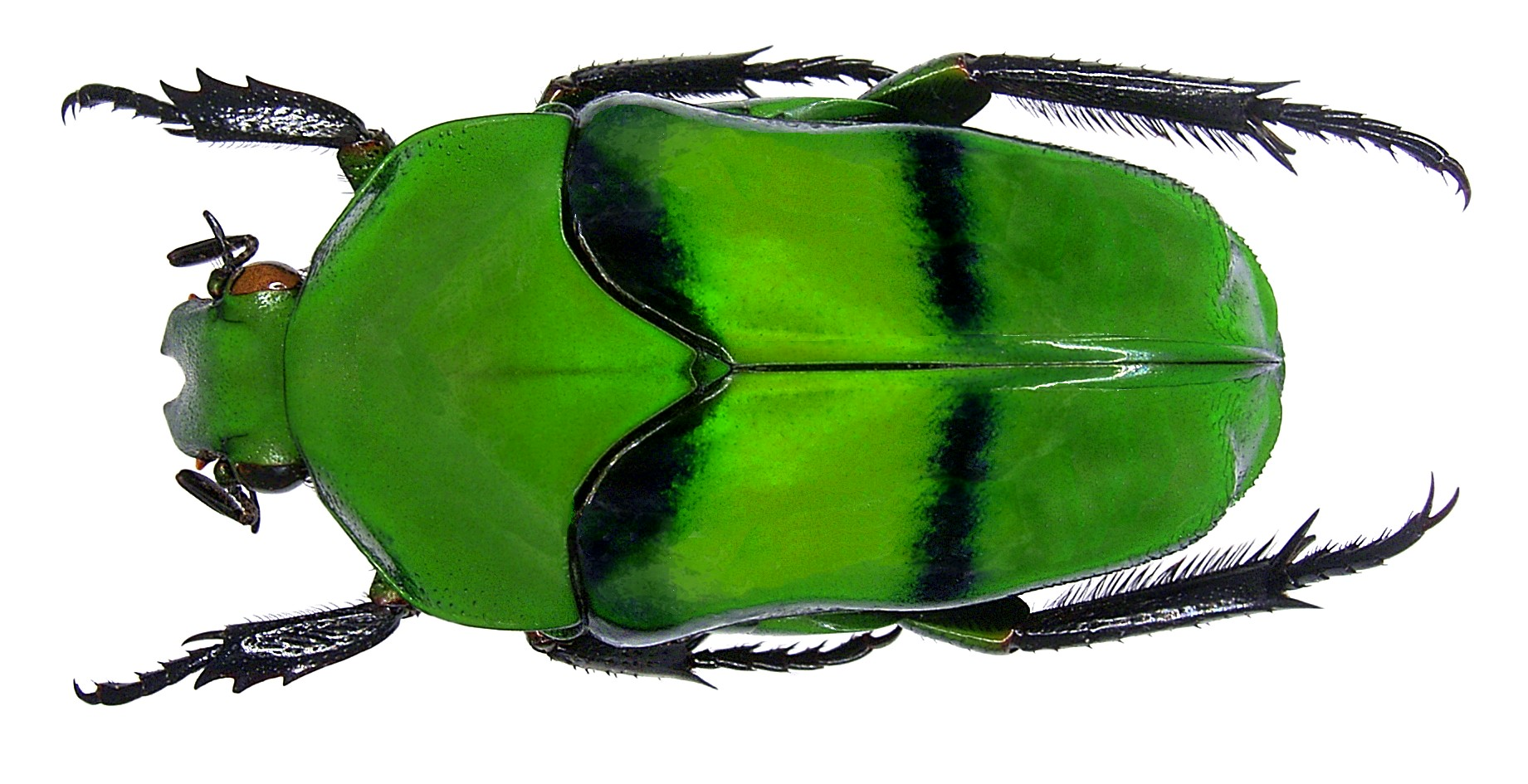
Ischiopsopha bifasciata

The New Guinea insect fauna demonstrates many principles of vicariance biogeography and New Guinea has played a strategic role in the spread of insects in various directions. It has functioned as an area of evolution of higher taxa, and of their spread, as well as being a zone of faunal mixture of two distinct zoogeographical regions the Indomalayan realm and the Australasian realm. New Guinea has a distinct insect fauna which apparently evolved in long isolation. Over the Tertiary it consisted of a land mass (often called the Melanesian continent) more isolated than the present New Guinea, and farther to the northeast. This may have divided into a Solomons and a New Guinea part. Part of New Britain, Manus Island, and the Cyclops Mountains of northcentral New Guinea are postulated as the only remaining parts of the original New Guinea portion. Southern New Ireland was apparently part of the Solomons mass. In the Pliocene New Guinea rose from the sea bottom, and in the Pleistocene connected with Australia for a sufficient period to permit faunal exchange. The oceanic Pacific Islands received insects from New Guinea The number of higher taxa falls with greater distance from New Guinea, with the age of island groups In some. The insect faunas of New Guinea and New Zealand interchanged through New Caledonia not Australia.

There is no comprehensive overview on the insect fauna of New Guinea but a bibliography is available There may be 100,000–300,000 species and Papua New Guinea ranks 12th in the world in terms of endemism of large butterflies. The Papua Insects Foundation provides an expert resource

Notable endemic insect species include Ornithoptera paradisea, Ornithoptera chimaera, Papilio weymeri, Graphium weiskei, Ideopsis hewitsonii, Taenaris catops, Parantica rotundata, Parantica clinias, Rosenbergia rufolineata, Mecopus doryphorus, Mecopus serrirostris, Sphingnotus mirabilis, Sphingnotus insignis, Belionota aenea, Poropterus solidus, Poropterus gemmifer, Promechus splendens, Aporhina bispinosa, Eupholus petitii, Eupholus bennetti, Schizoeupsalis promissa, Barystethus tropicus, Eupholus geoffroyi, Rhinoscapha loriai, Rhinoscapha funebris, Rhinoscapha insignis Alcides exornatus, Alcides elegans, Xenocerus lacrymans, Arachnobas sectator, Arrhenodes digramma, Eupholus magnificus, Mecopus bispinosus, Callictita spp.. Also known from New Guinea are Batocera wallacei, Ithystenus curvidens, Meganthribus pupa, Sipalinus gigas, Pelargoderus rubropunctatus, Rhynchophorus bilineatus, Gasterocercus anatinus, Acalolepta australis, Actinus imperialis, Megacrania batesii.

== See also ==
- Ecoregions of New Guinea
- Lorentz National Park
- Wasur National Park
