= Mecopus =

Mecopus may refer to either of two genera:

- Mecopus (plant)
- Mecopus (beetle)
