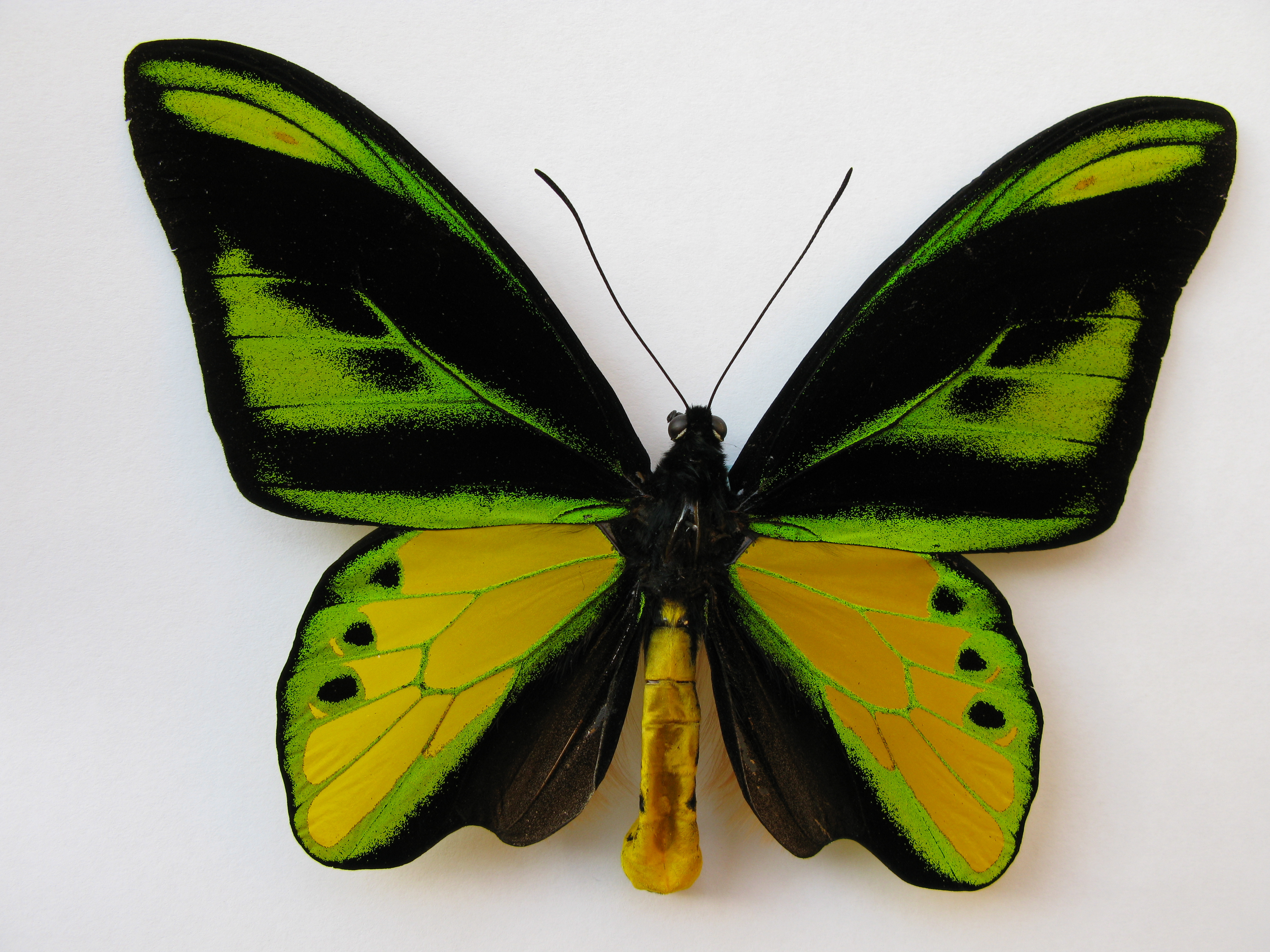
- Male
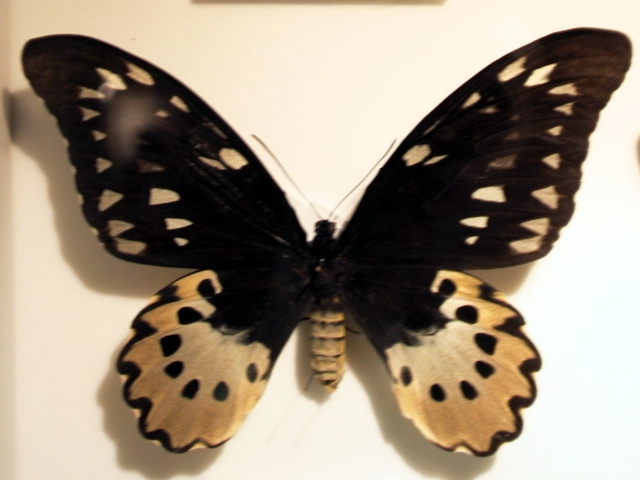
- Female

Conservation status
- Least Concern (IUCN 3.1)
- CITES Appendix II

Scientific classification
- Kingdom: Animalia
- Phylum: Arthropoda
- Clade: Pancrustacea
- Class: Insecta
- Order: Lepidoptera
- Family: Papilionidae
- Genus: Ornithoptera
- Species: O. chimaera

Binomial name
- Ornithoptera chimaera Rothschild, 1904

= Ornithoptera chimaera =

Chimaera birdwing

Species of birdwing butterfly

Ornithoptera chimaera, the chimaera birdwing, is a birdwing butterfly of the family Papilionidae. It is found in mountain areas of New Guinea, 1000 meters above sea level.

The "chimaera" portion of both the scientific and vernacular name, is named after the Chimaera, Greek: Χίμαιρα, Khimaira, from χίμαρος, khimaros, a creature in Greek mythology, composed of parts of three animals.

== Description ==
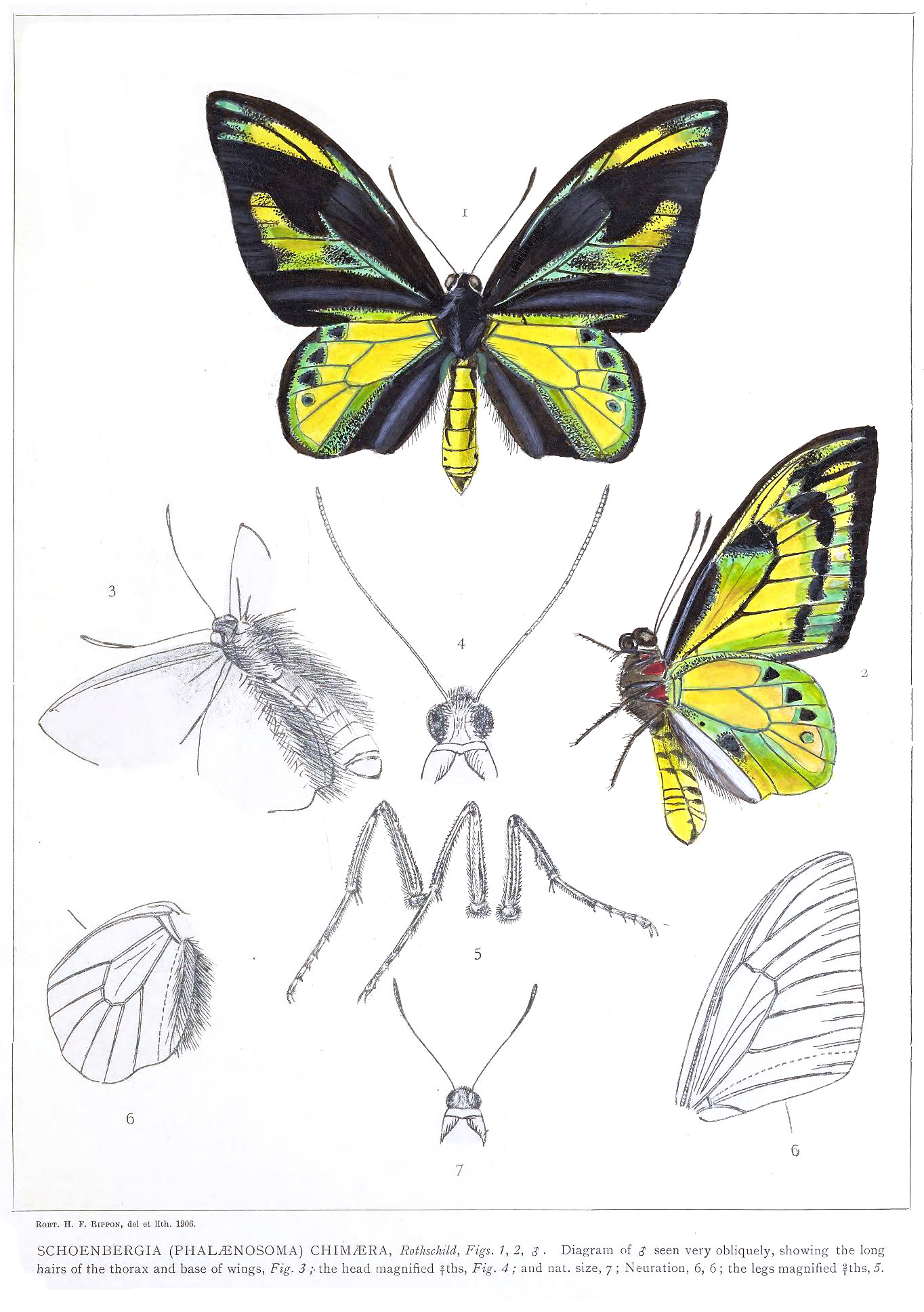
As Schoenbergia chimaera, male in Robert Henry Fernando Rippon's Icones Ornithopterorum (1898 to 1906)

Ornithoptera chimaera is sexually dimorphic. The wingspan is 80–180 mm in females and 70–150 mm in males.

Male: The forewings are ground colour black. There are two green areas. The underside of the forewing is green. The margin of the wing is black. The veins are black. There is a chain of little postdiscal internervular black spots on the wing. The hindwing inner part and the edge are black. The other part of the wing is green and contains some large, golden spots and two or more black spots. The underside of the hindwing is green. There are large, golden spots and three black spots. The inner edge is very hairy.

The abdomen is bright yellow. Head and thorax are black. The underside of thorax has two red tufts.

Female: The female is larger than the male. The general colour of the female is dark brown. There is a chain of white postdiscal spots on the forewings, a discal chain and white subcostal spots. In the discal part of the hindwings there is a large, white area. The outer edge of this white area is yellow. Between the white part and the yellow part there is a chain of black spots.

== Subspecies ==
- Ornithoptera chimaera chimaera
- Ornithoptera chimaera charybdis (van Eecke, 1915)
- Ornithoptera chimaera flavidior Rothschild, 1913

== Type material ==
The holotype is in the Natural History Museum, London.

== Biology ==
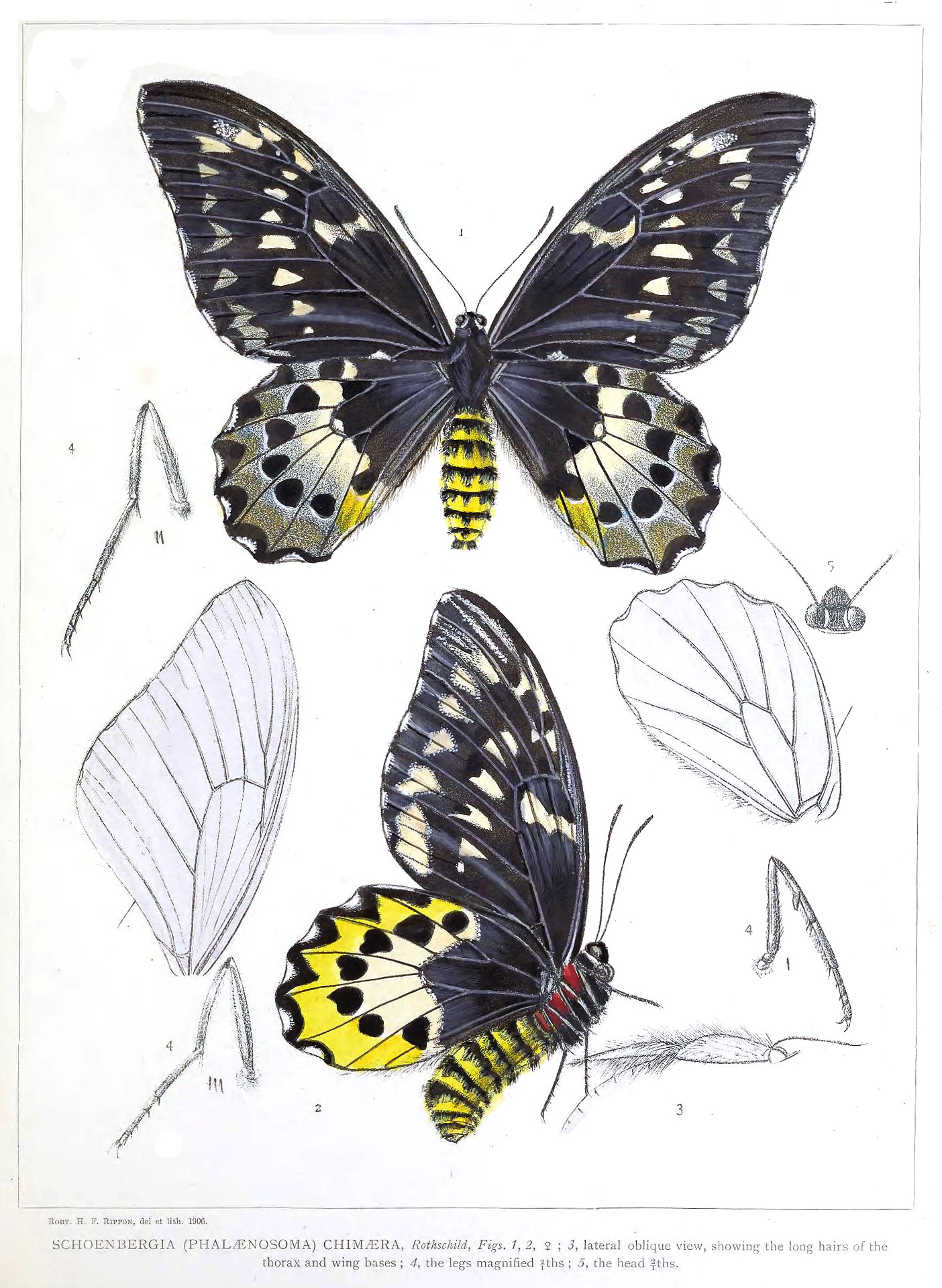
Female

O. chimaera is a montane species found in the Central Range montane rainforests. The larvae feed on species of the genus Aristolochia including Aristolochia momandul. The female lays up to 20 eggs on the leaves. Adults feeds upon the nectar of Spathodea (an invasive species) and Hibiscus. Groups of both sexes can be seen circling the tops of these trees in the canopy.

== Conservation ==
The chimaera birdwing is listed on CITES Appendix II, restricting international trade to those who have been granted a permit. It is also regarded at near threatened by the IUCN. The chimaera birdwing is listed on Appendix II of the Convention on International Trade in Endangered Species, which serves to regulate the trade in the species or any of its parts by requiring export licences and producing quotas

== Gallery ==
Selection of museum specimens of Ornithoptera chimaera
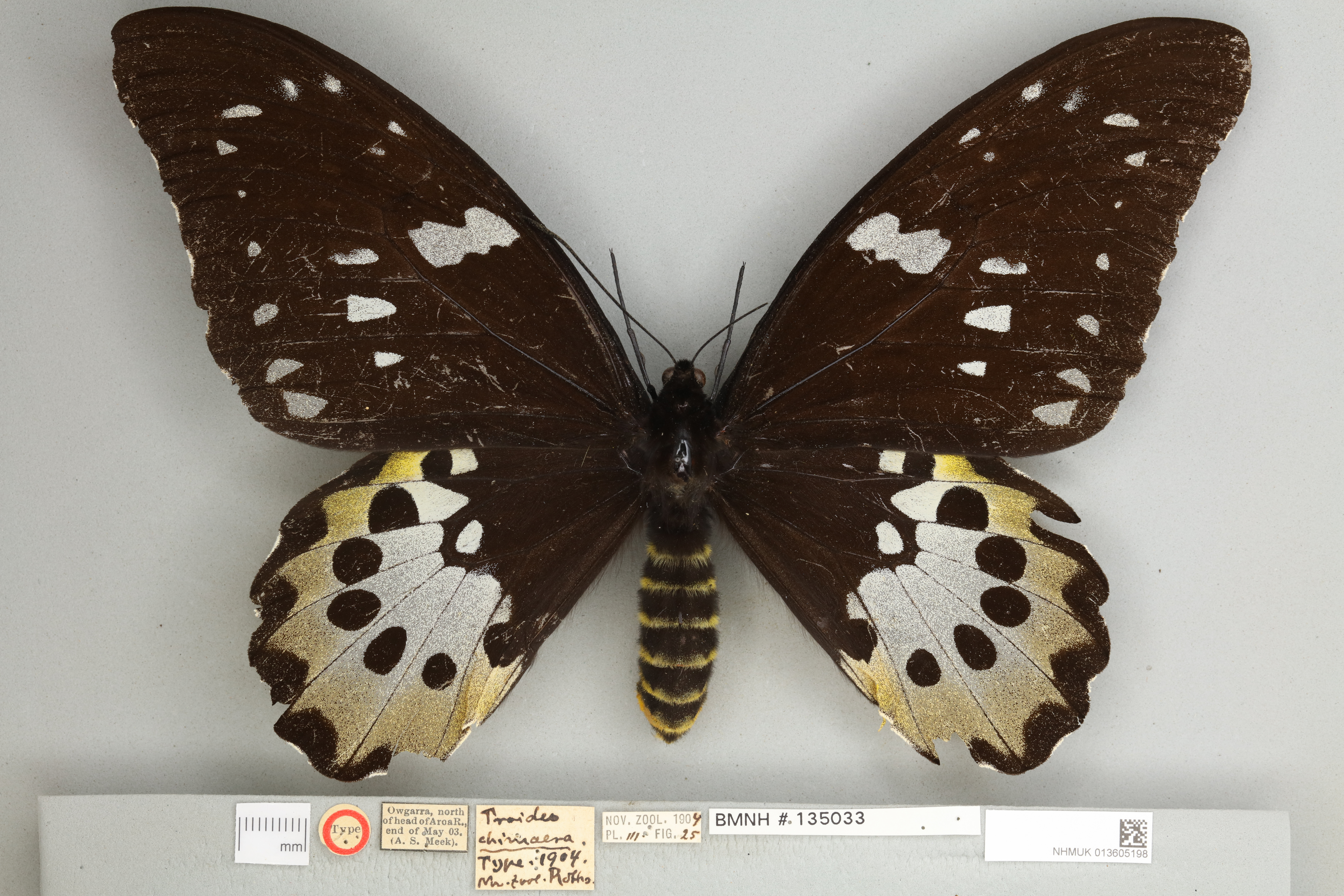
Ornithoptera chimaera, Holotype female dorsal view

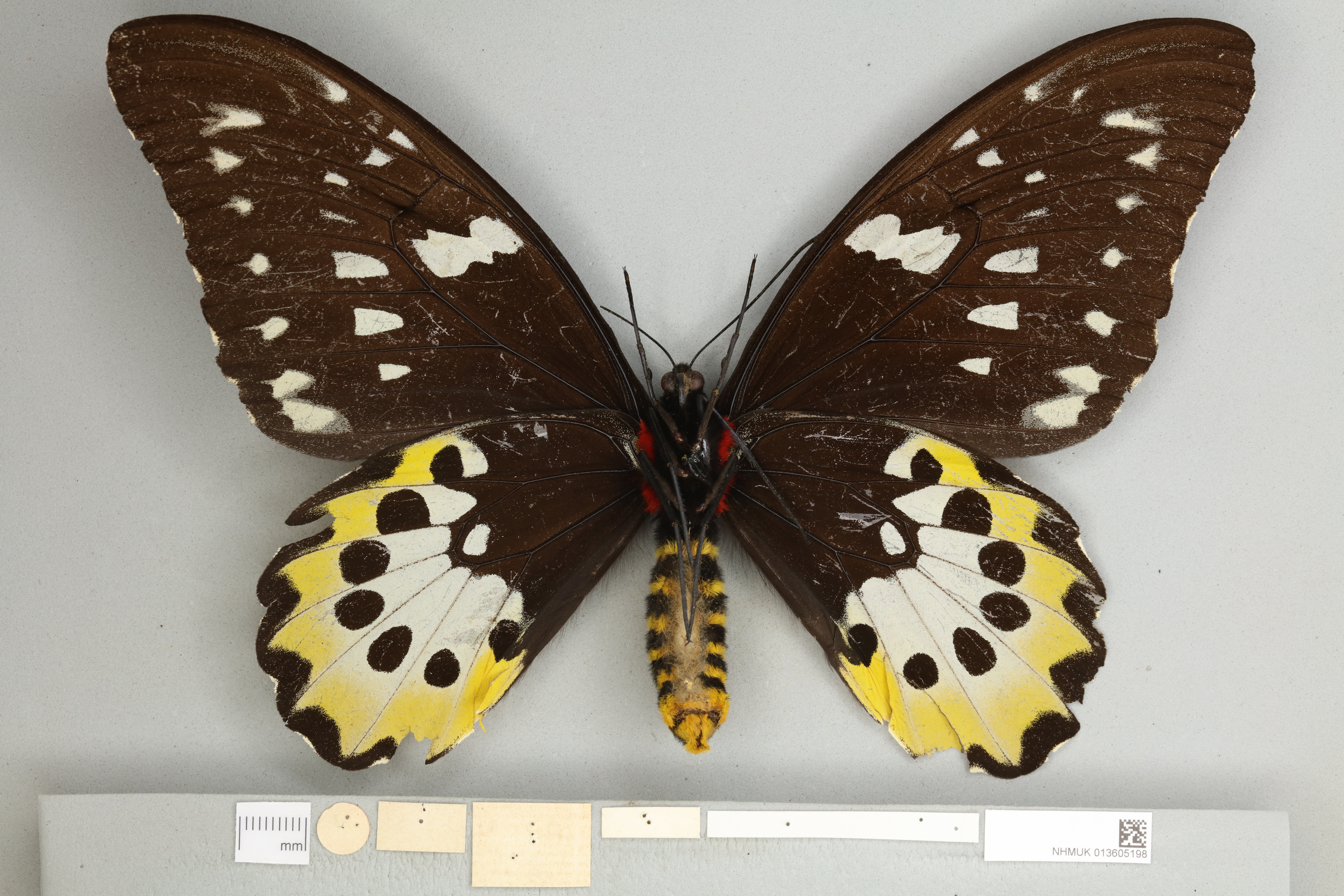
Ornithoptera chimaera, Holotype female ventral view

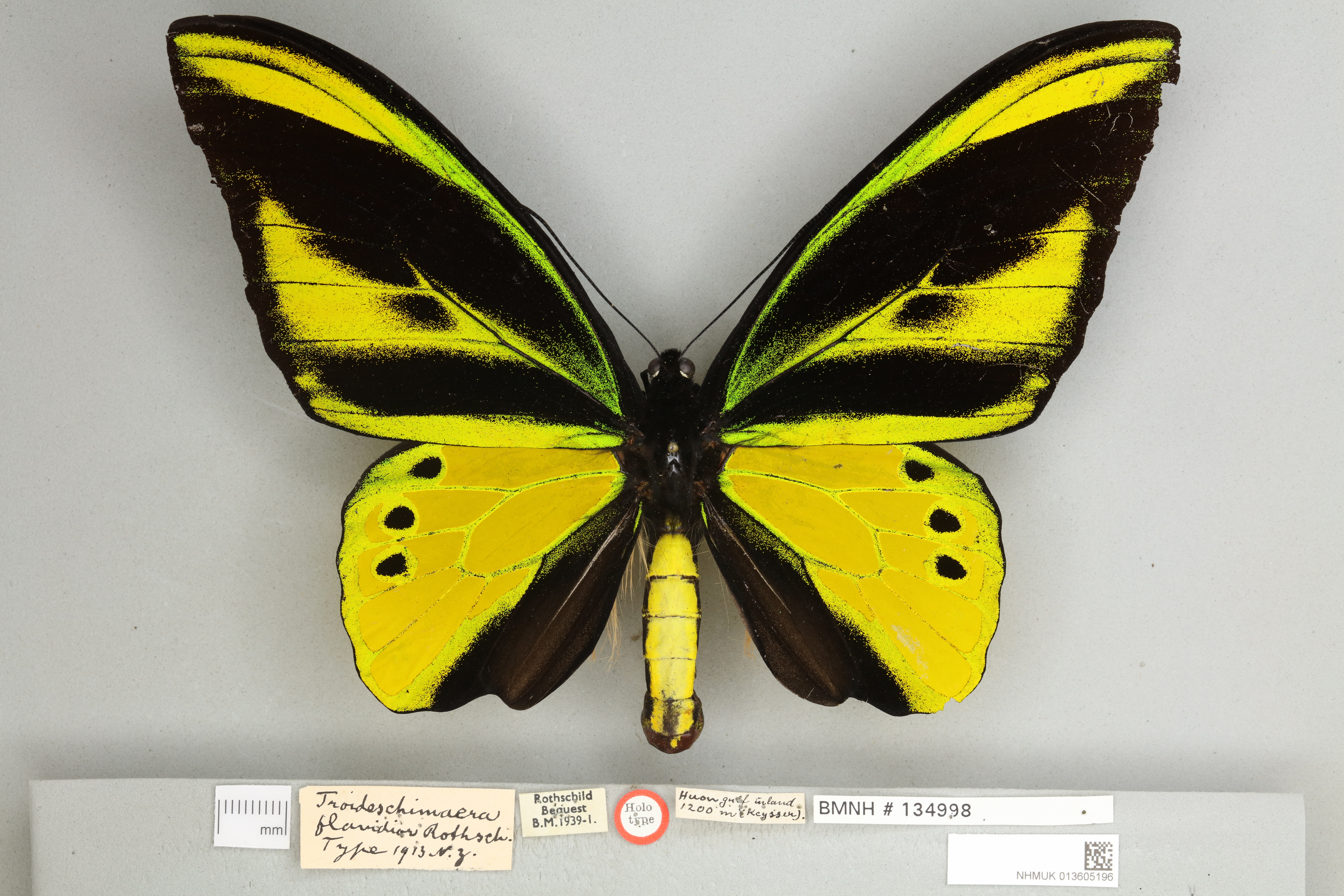
Ornithoptera chimaera flavidior, Holotype male dorsal view

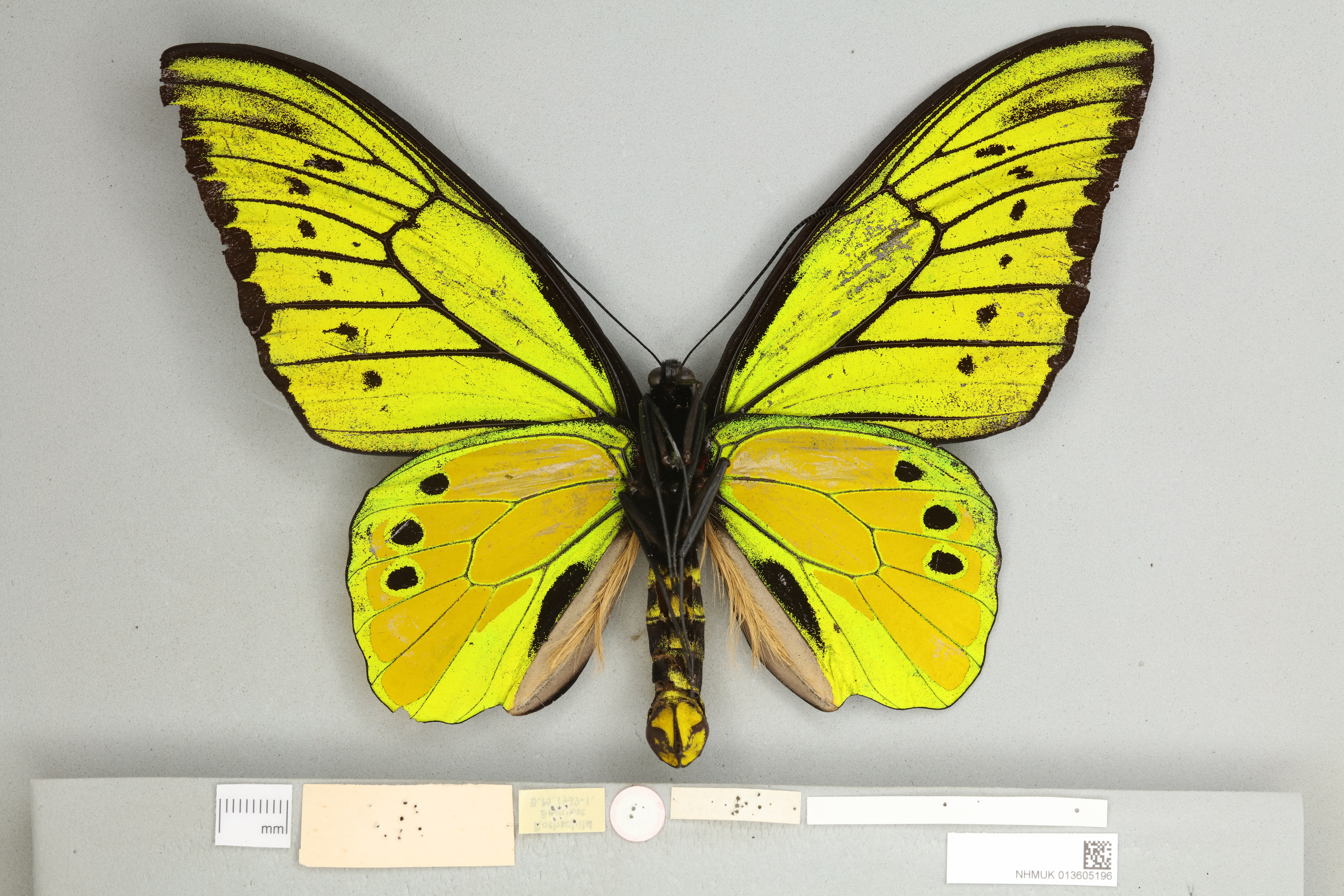
Ornithoptera chimaera flavidior, Holotype male ventral view

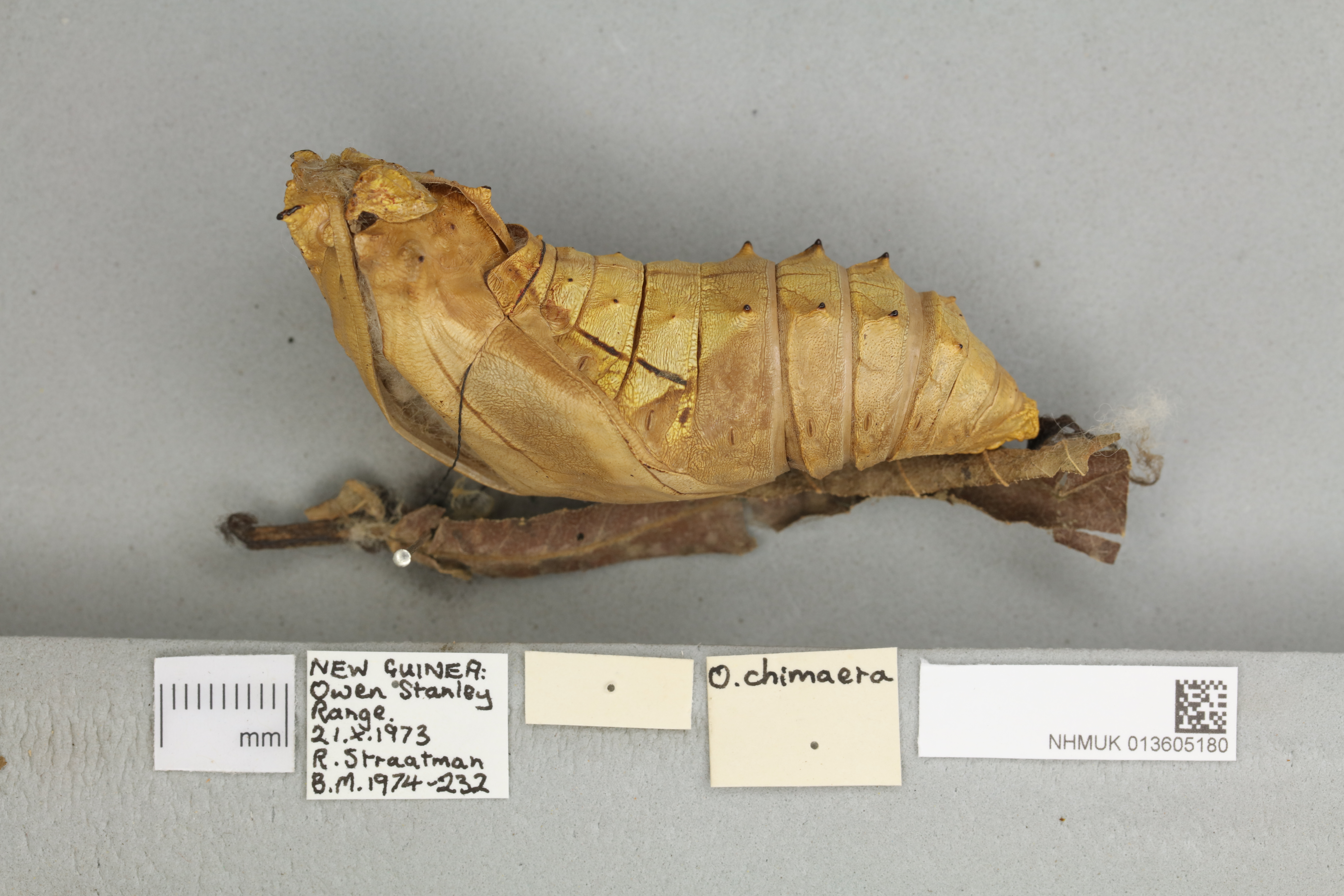
Ornithoptera chimaera chimaera, pupa lateral view

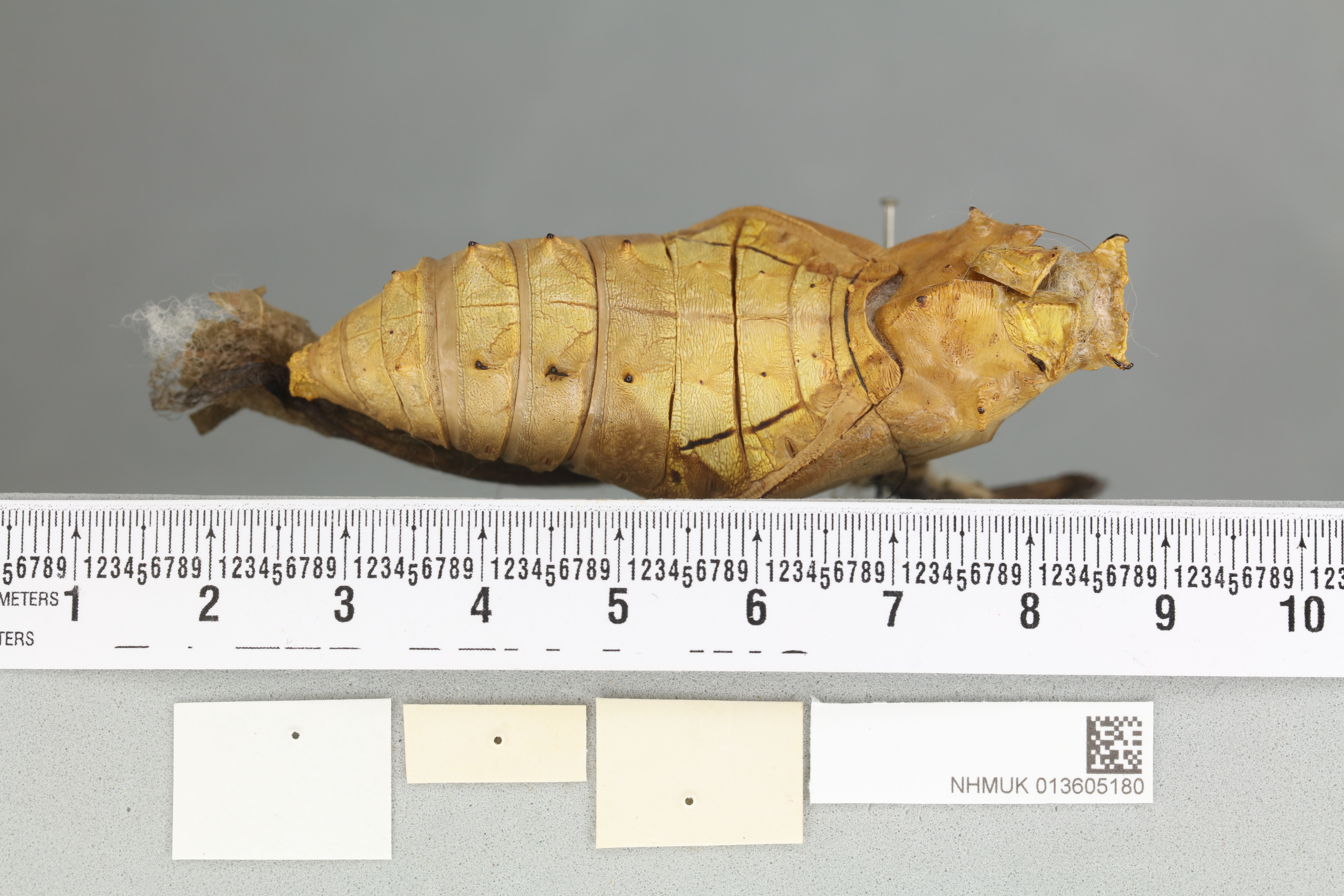
Ornithoptera chimaera chimaera, pupa dorsal view

== See also ==
- Fauna of New Guinea
