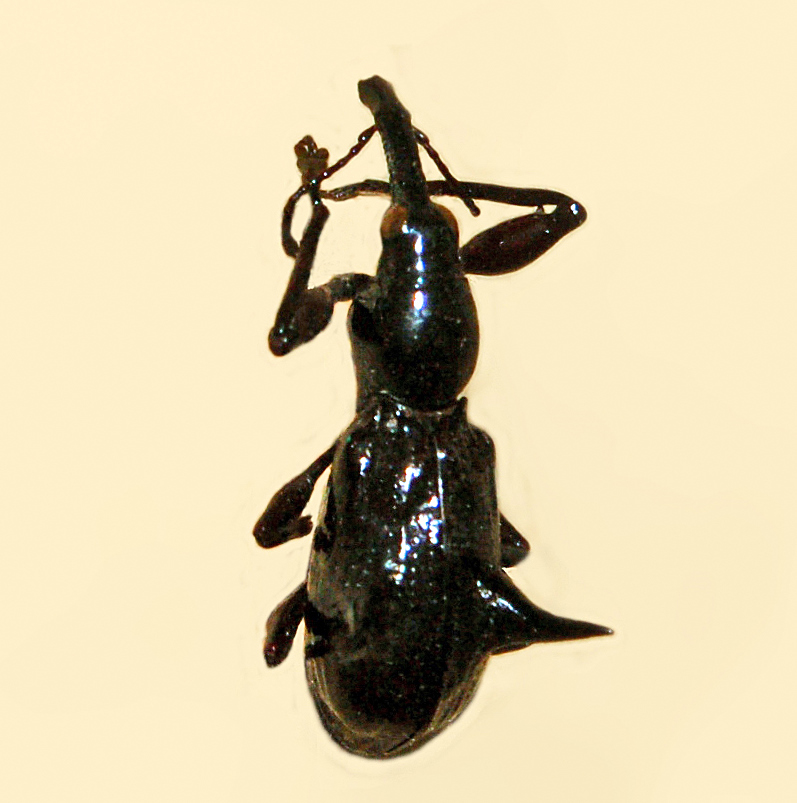
- Brentidae - Aporhina bispinosa.

Scientific classification
- Domain: Eukaryota
- Kingdom: Animalia
- Phylum: Arthropoda
- Class: Insecta
- Order: Coleoptera
- Suborder: Polyphaga
- Infraorder: Cucujiformia
- Family: Brentidae
- Subfamily: Eurhynchinae
- Genus: Aporhina; Boisduval, 1835

= Aporhina =

Genus of beetles

Aporhina is a genus of beetles belonging to the family Brentidae.

The species of this genus are found in Eastern Malesia and Australia.

== Species ==
Species:

- Aporhina alboguttata (Snellen van Vollenhoven, 1866)
- Aporhina aruensis (Heller, 1896)
- Aporhina aspericollis (Heller, 1910)
- Aporhina assimilis (Györffyi, 1917)
- Aporhina australis (Heller, 1896)
- Aporhina bennigseni (Wagner, 1912)
- Aporhina biroi (Györffyi, 1917)
- Aporhina bispinosa Boisduval, 1835
- Aporhina exarmata (Heller, 1905)
- Aporhina granosispina (Heller, 1925)
- Aporhina helleri (Wagner, 1912)
- Aporhina inermis (Heller, 1897)
- Aporhina insignis (Heller, 1905)
- Aporhina levigata (Heller, 1925)
- Aporhina magdalenae (Györffyi, 1917)
- Aporhina massutei (Heller, 1901)
- Aporhina mesospila (Györffyi, 1917)
- Aporhina mutica (Heller, 1925)
- Aporhina nitens (Snellen van Vollenhoven, 1866)
- Aporhina obtusispina (Heller, 1925)
- Aporhina pulchra Oberprieler in Sforzi and Bartolozzi, 2004
- Aporhina richteri (Faust, 1892)
