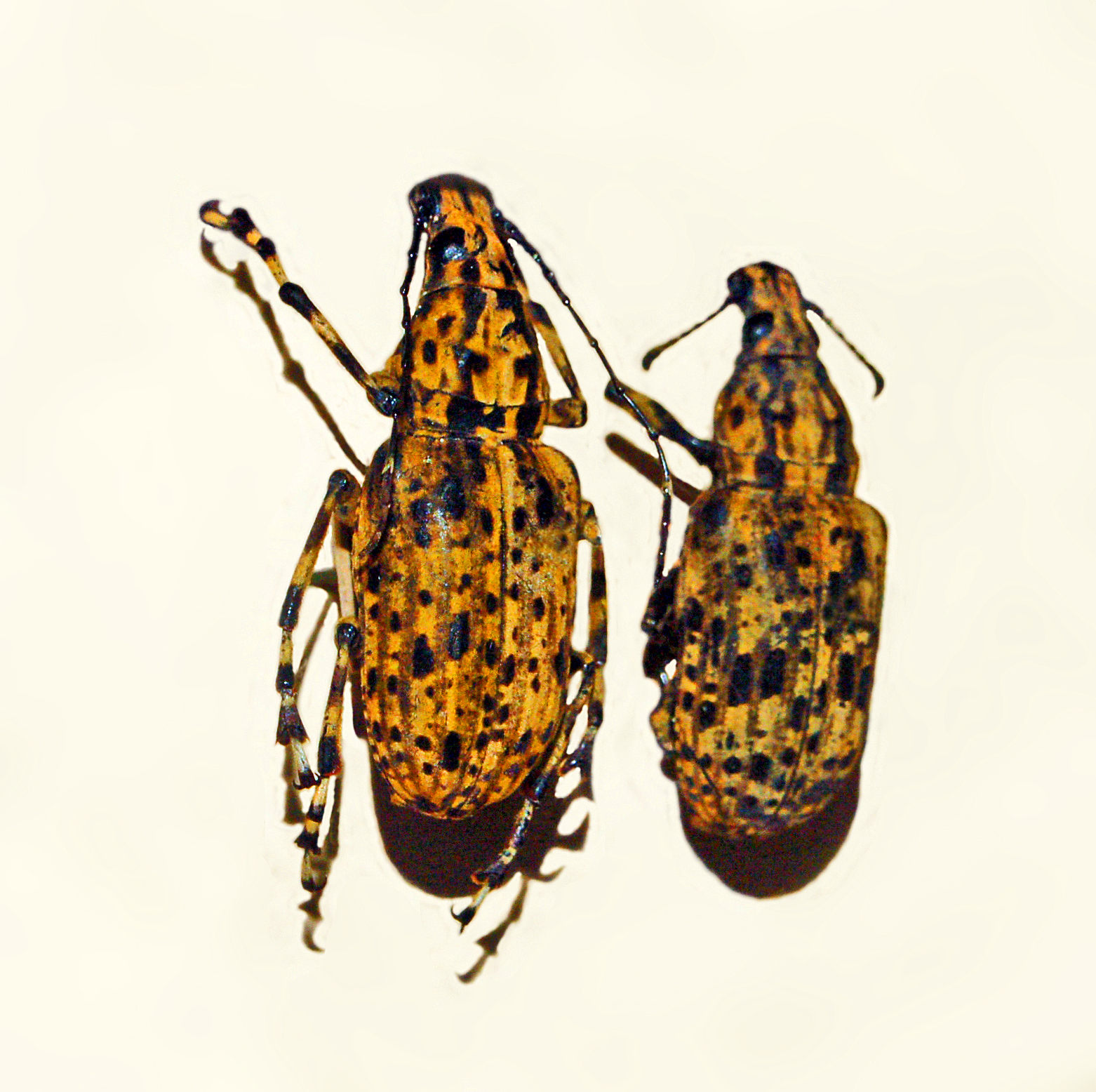
- Meganthribus pupa from New Guinea. Male and female

Scientific classification
- Kingdom: Animalia
- Phylum: Arthropoda
- Class: Insecta
- Order: Coleoptera
- Suborder: Polyphaga
- Infraorder: Cucujiformia
- Family: Anthribidae
- Genus: Meganthribus; Jordan, 1913

= Meganthribus =

Genus of beetles

Meganthribus is a genus of beetles belonging to the Anthribidae family.

== Species ==
- Meganthribus atopus
- Meganthribus bakeri
- Meganthribus childreni
- Meganthribus confluens
- Meganthribus euspilus
- Meganthribus harmandi
- Meganthribus mindorensis
- Meganthribus nubilus
- Meganthribus papuanus
- Meganthribus pupa
- Meganthribus schanus
- Meganthribus spilosus
- Meganthribus sulphureus
- Meganthribus tessellatus
- Meganthribus whitcheadi
- Meganthribus whiteheadi
