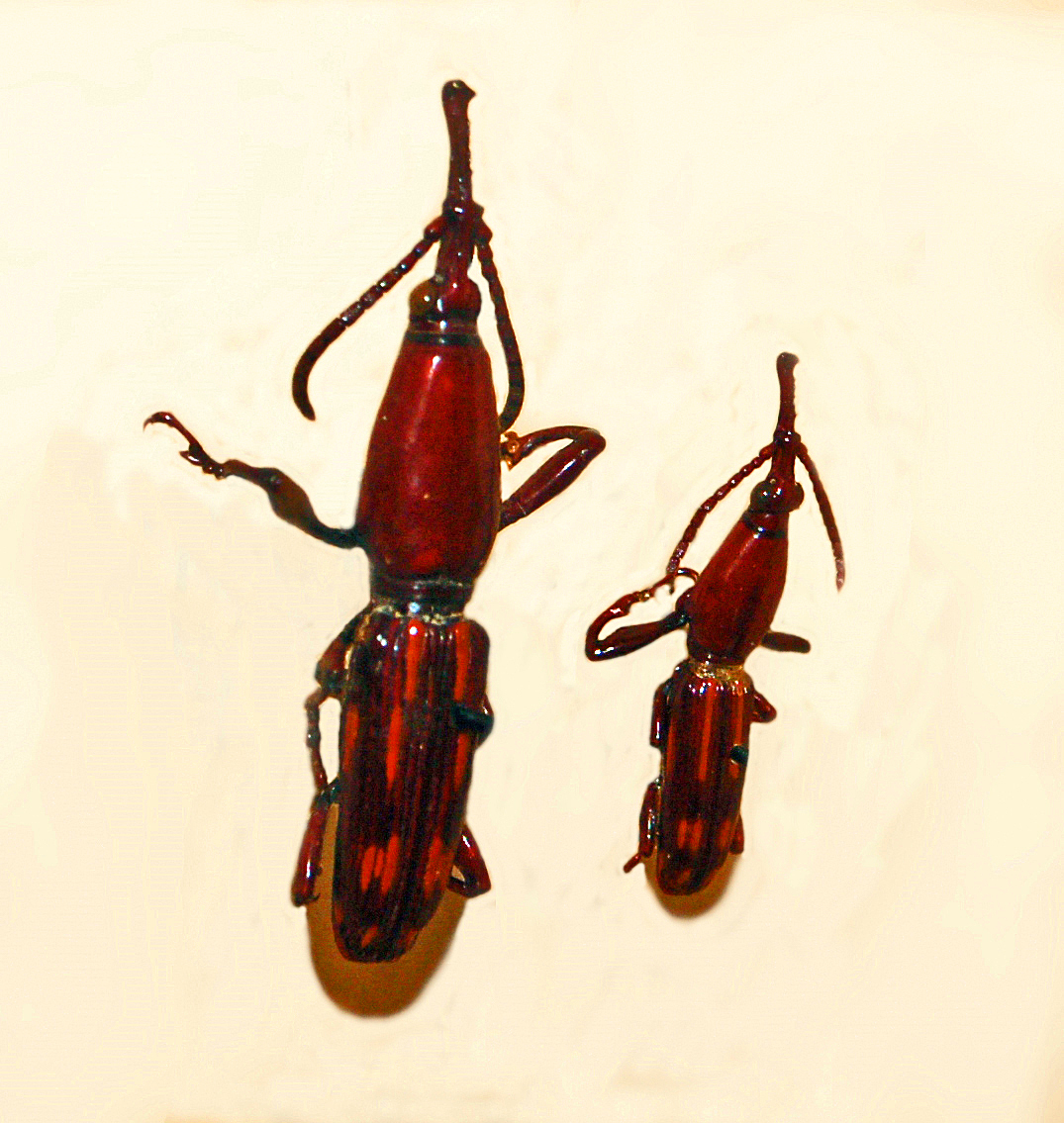
- Orychodes digramma from Papua New Guinea

Scientific classification
- Domain: Eukaryota
- Kingdom: Animalia
- Phylum: Arthropoda
- Class: Insecta
- Order: Coleoptera
- Suborder: Polyphaga
- Infraorder: Cucujiformia
- Family: Brentidae
- Subfamily: Brentinae
- Tribe: Arrhenodini
- Genus: Orychodes; Pascoe, 1862

= Orychodes =

Genus of beetle

Orychodes is a genus of beetle in the Brentidae family.

== Species ==
According to the Brentidae of the World checklist, the following species are accepted within Orychodes:

- Orychodes abnormis (Kleine, 1921)
- Orychodes andrewsi Gahan, 1900
- Orychodes digramma (Boisduval, 1835)
- Orychodes fasciatus (Kleine, 1921)
- Orychodes indus Kirsch, 1875
- Orychodes insulanus (Kleine, 1921)
- Orychodes maassi (Kleine, 1926)
- Orychodes nigerrimus (Kleine, 1921)
- Orychodes octoguttatus (Nakane, 1963)
- Orychodes planicollis (Walker, 1859)
- Orychodes rubrosignatus (Kleine, 1921)
- Orychodes serrirostris Lund, 1800
- Orychodes sinensis Fairmaire, 1888
- Orychodes splendens Kirsch, 1875
- Orychodes versicolor (Kleine, 1921)
