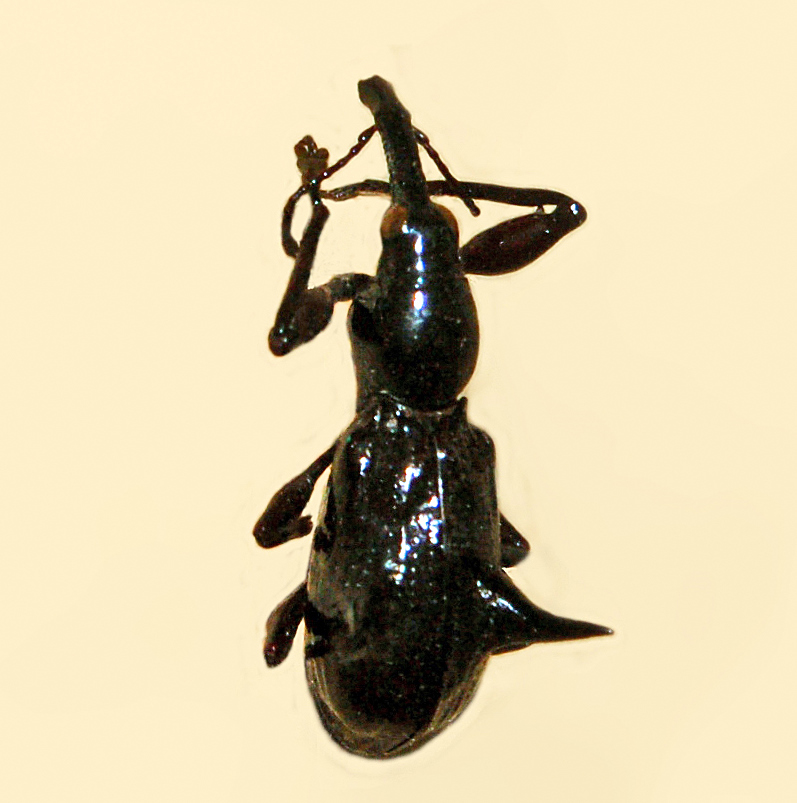
- Aporhina bispinosa

Scientific classification
- Domain: Eukaryota
- Kingdom: Animalia
- Phylum: Arthropoda
- Class: Insecta
- Order: Coleoptera
- Suborder: Polyphaga
- Infraorder: Cucujiformia
- Family: Brentidae
- Subfamily: Eurhynchinae; Lacordaire, 1863

= Eurhynchinae =

Subfamily of beetles

Eurhynchinae is a subfamily of beetles belonging to the family Brentidae.

== Genera ==
Genera accepted within the subfamily:

- Aporhina Boisduval, 1835
- Ctenaphydes Pascoe, 1870
- Eurhynchus Kirby, 1828
- Orapaeus Kuschel and Oberprieler in Kuschel, Oberprieler and Rayner, 1994
