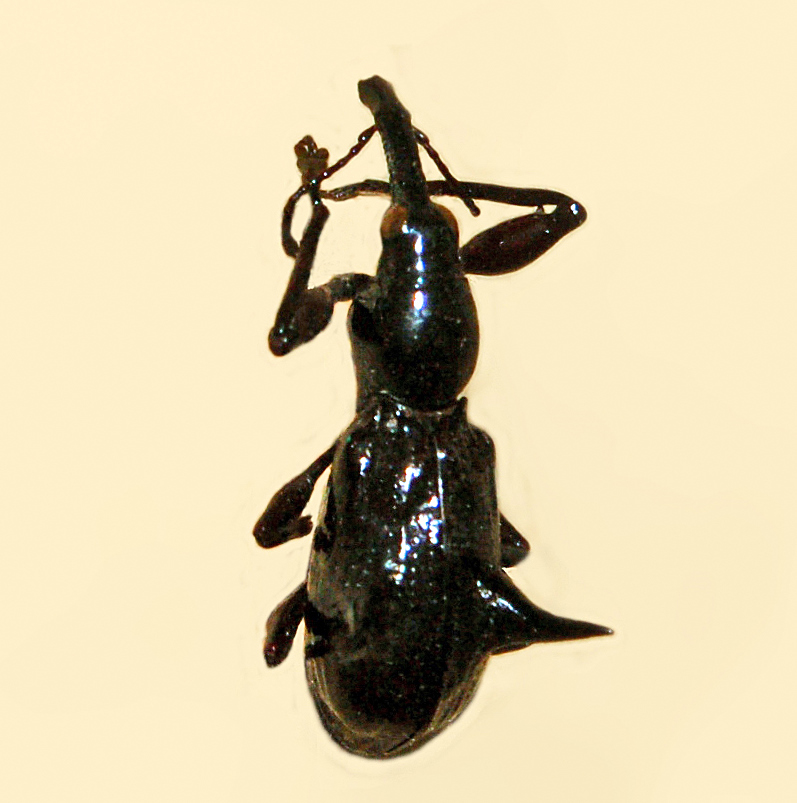
- Aporhina bispinosa from Papua New Guinea

Scientific classification
- Kingdom: Animalia
- Phylum: Arthropoda
- Clade: Pancrustacea
- Class: Insecta
- Order: Coleoptera
- Suborder: Polyphaga
- Infraorder: Cucujiformia
- Superfamily: Curculionoidea
- Family: Brentidae
- Genus: Aporhina
- Species: A. bispinosa

Binomial name
- Aporhina bispinosa Boisduval, 1835

= Aporhina bispinosa =

Species of beetle

Aporhina bispinosa is a species of Brentidae family, Eurhynchinae subfamily, the latter also being treated as Eurhynchidae family.

== Description ==
Aporhina bispinosa reaches about 9–10 millimetres (0.35–0.39 in) in length. This beetle has a dark green or blackish coloration and two long thorns in the middle of elytra (hence the Latin name bispinosa).

== Distribution ==
This species is known from New Guinea in both Papua New Guinea and Western New Guinea (Indonesia), as well as from some islands off Western New Guinea (Aru Islands and Waigeo Island).

== Subspecies ==
There are five subspecies:

- Aporhina bispinosa bispinosa Boisduval, 1835 – Papua New Guinea; Aru Islands; Waigeo Island
- Aporhina bispinosa aruensis (Heller, 1896) – Aru Islands
- Aporhina bispinosa guttifera (Heller), 1896 – West Papua
- Aporhina bispinosa intermedia (Heller, 1896) – Papua New Guinea
- Aporhina bispinosa macrospilotus (Heller, 1925) – Papua New Guinea
