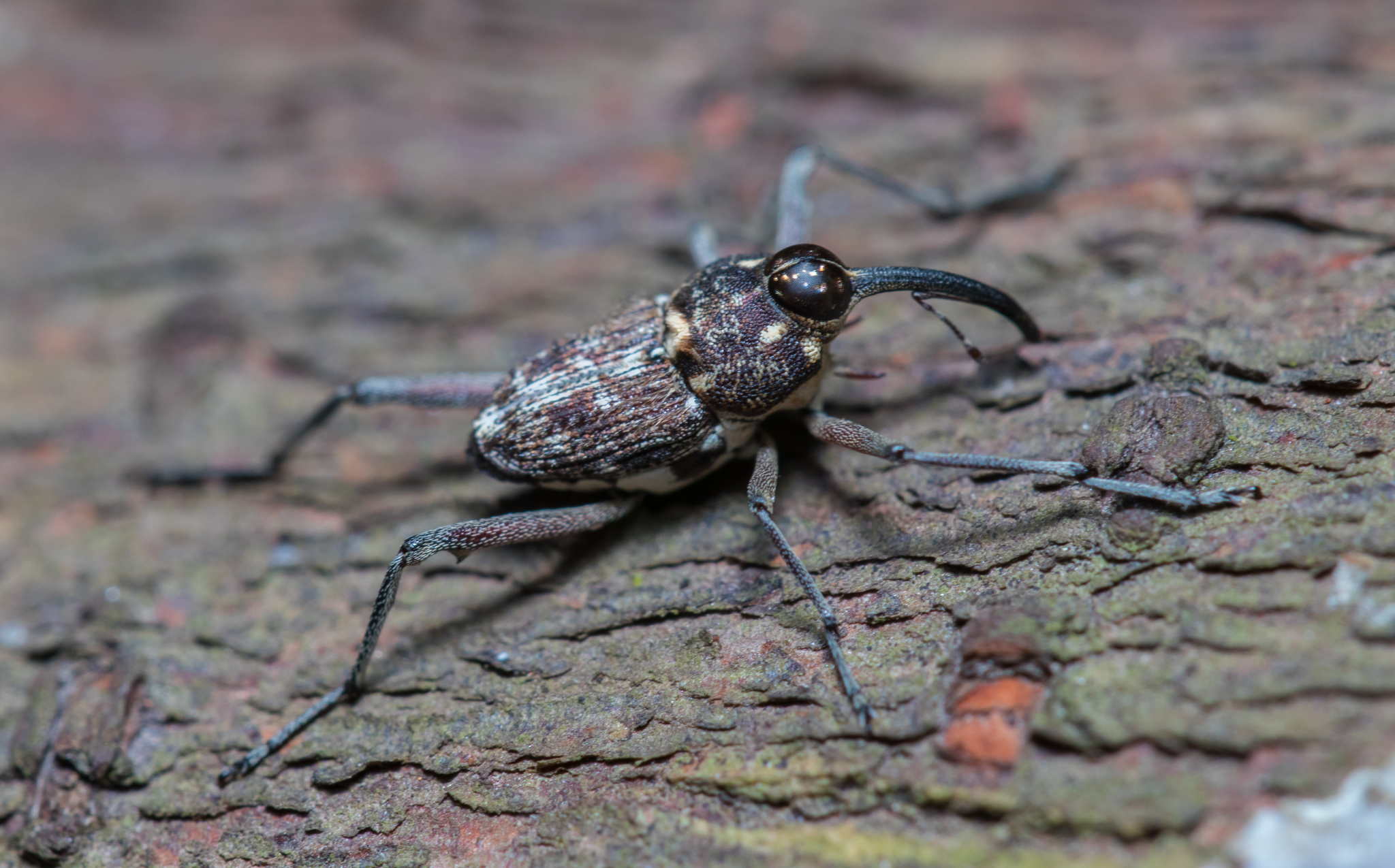
- Mecopus, China

Scientific classification
- Kingdom: Animalia
- Phylum: Arthropoda
- Class: Insecta
- Order: Coleoptera
- Suborder: Polyphaga
- Infraorder: Cucujiformia
- Family: Curculionidae
- Tribe: Mecopini
- Genus: Mecopus; Schoenherr, 1825

Synonyms
- Mecops Latreille, 1828

= Mecopus (beetle) =

Genus of beetles

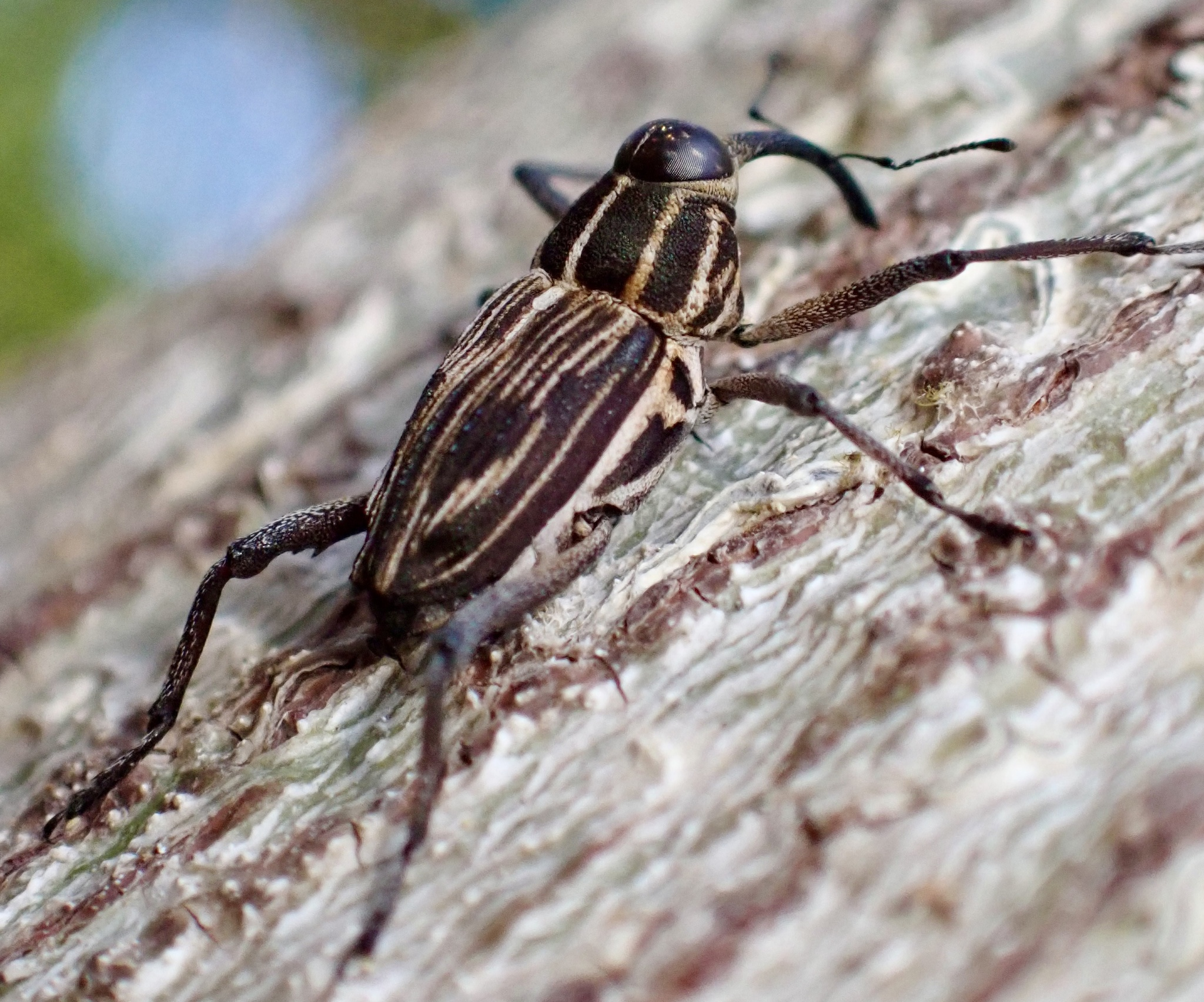
Mecopus, Indonesia

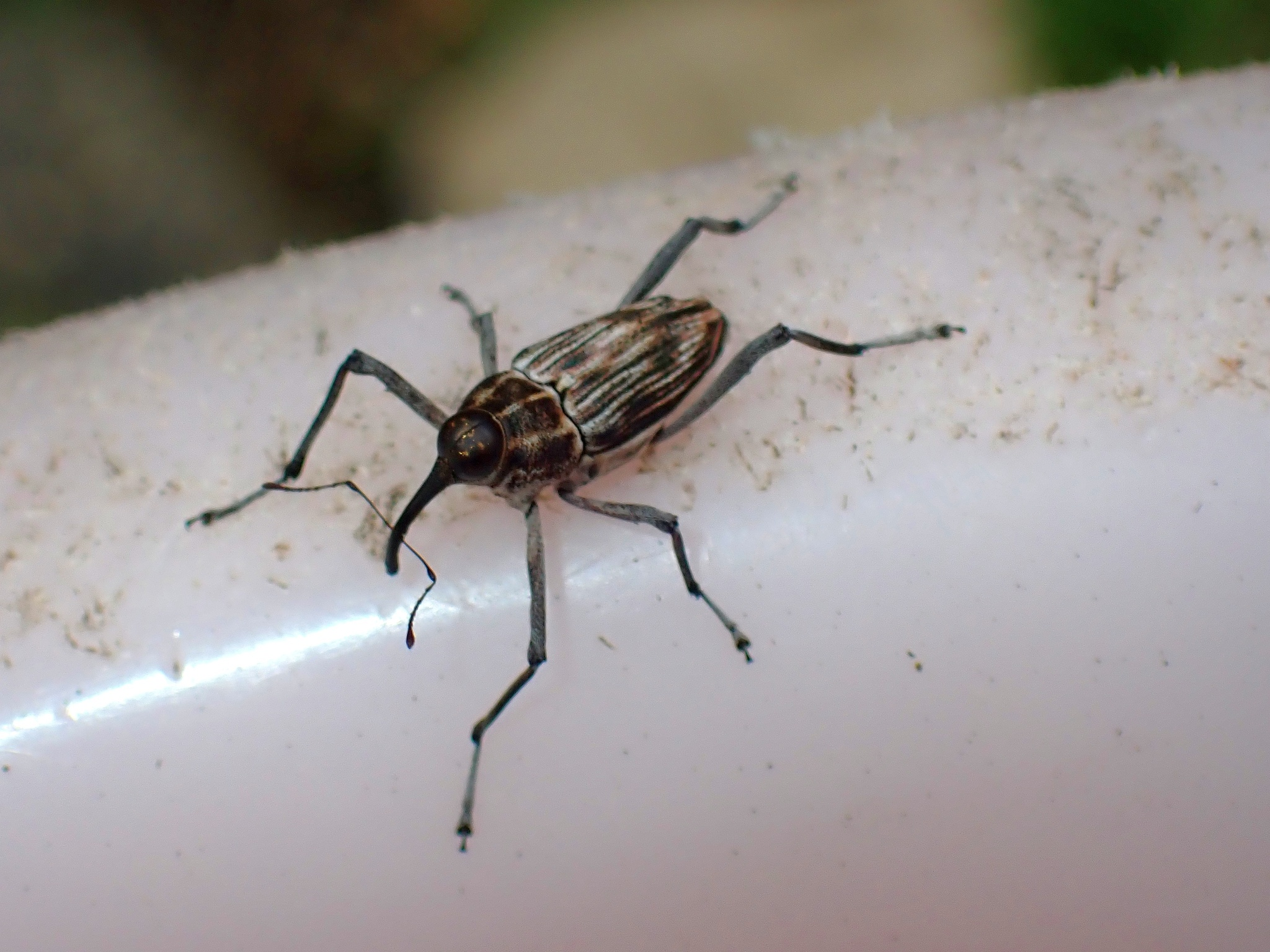
Mecopus trilineatus, Vanuatu

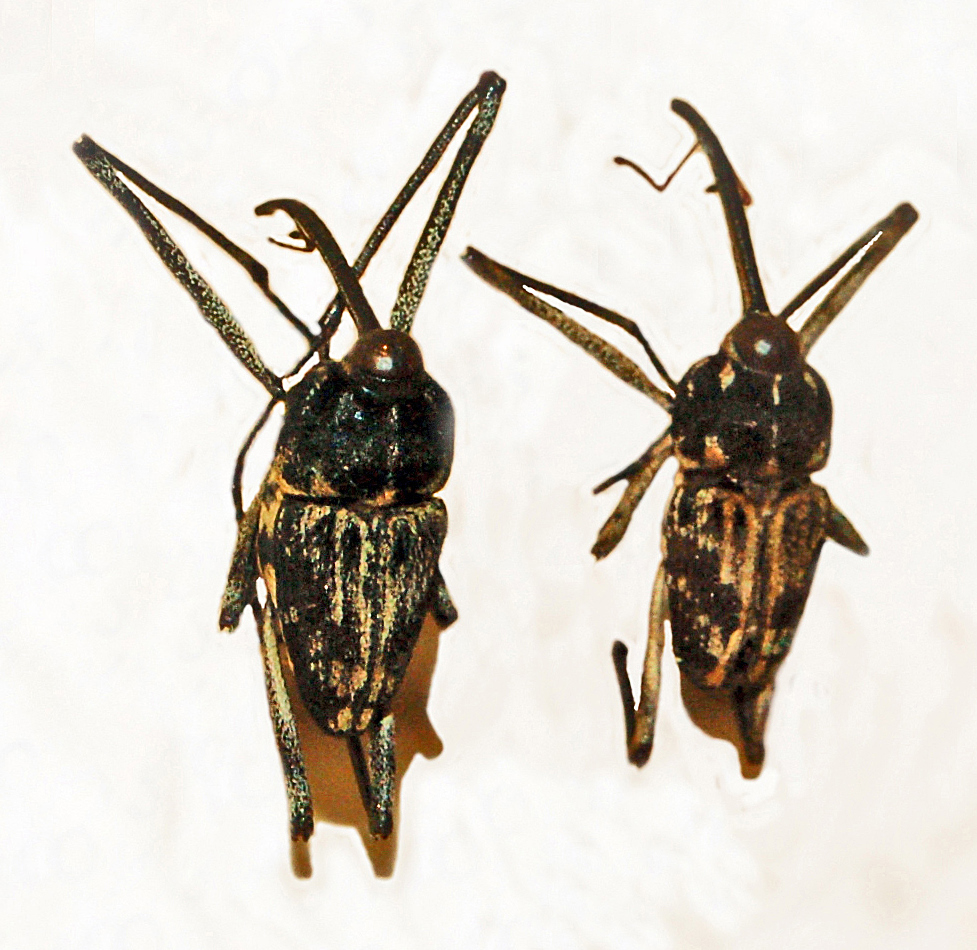
Mecopus bispinosus from Maluku Islands, Male and female

Mecopus is a genus of weevils in the beetle family Curculionidae. There are more than 50 described species in Mecopus, found in Southeast Asia, Australia, Africa, and Pacific Islands.

== Species ==
These species belong to the genus Mecopus:

- Mecopus aculeatus Faust, 1893
- Mecopus adspersus Heller, 1893
- Mecopus albomaculatus Chevrolat
- Mecopus albosparsus Chevrolat
- Mecopus ambonensis Heller, 1892
- Mecopus audinetii Rosenschoeld, 1838
- Mecopus australasiae Heller, 1893
- Mecopus bakeri Heller, 1915
- Mecopus bispinosus (Weber, 1801)
- Mecopus brevipennis Hombron & Jacquinot, 1847
- Mecopus brevispina Fairmaire, 1878
- Mecopus caelestis Heller, 1924
- Mecopus caffer Fåhraeus, 1871
- Mecopus caledonicus Heller, 1892
- Mecopus capillatus Heller, 1908
- Mecopus ceylanensis Heller, 1892
- Mecopus coelestis Heller, 1924
- Mecopus collaris Pascoe, 1871
- Mecopus cruciatus Heller, 1893
- Mecopus crucifer Heller, 1893
- Mecopus cuneiformis Pascoe, 1871
- Mecopus curtus Chevrolat
- Mecopus davidis Fairmaire, 1878
- Mecopus doryphorus Quoy, 1824
- Mecopus fausti Heller, 1892
- Mecopus fractipennis Marshall, 1926
- Mecopus gabonicus Hustache, 1934
- Mecopus helleri Marshall, 1930
- Mecopus hopei Rosenschoeld, 1838
- Mecopus isabellinus Heller, 1894
- Mecopus kuhni Heller, 1908
- Mecopus letestui Hustache, 1934
- Mecopus lituratus Pascoe, 1871
- Mecopus longipes Chevrolat
- Mecopus ludovici Heller, 1892
- Mecopus macleayi Lea, 1910
- Mecopus nigritus Heller, 1893
- Mecopus nigroplagiatus Heller, 1921
- Mecopus niveoscutellaris Heller, 1921
- Mecopus phthisicus Lea, 1898
- Mecopus pictus Lea, 1910
- Mecopus pulvereus Pascoe, 1871
- Mecopus pumilus Hustache, 1928
- Mecopus rufipes Heller, 1893
- Mecopus rufirostris Heller, 1893
- Mecopus sellatus Heller, 1893
- Mecopus serrirostris Pascoe, 1871
- Mecopus severini Heller, 1893
- Mecopus similis Heller, 1893
- Mecopus sobrinus Lea, 1910
- Mecopus sphaerops Schoenherr, 1838
- Mecopus spinicollis Pascoe, 1871
- Mecopus talanthoides Heller, 1892
- Mecopus tenuipes Pascoe, 1871
- Mecopus terraereginae Heller, 1892
- Mecopus tipularis Pascoe, 1870
- Mecopus tipularius Pascoe, 1870
- Mecopus trilineatus Guérin-Méneville, 1833
