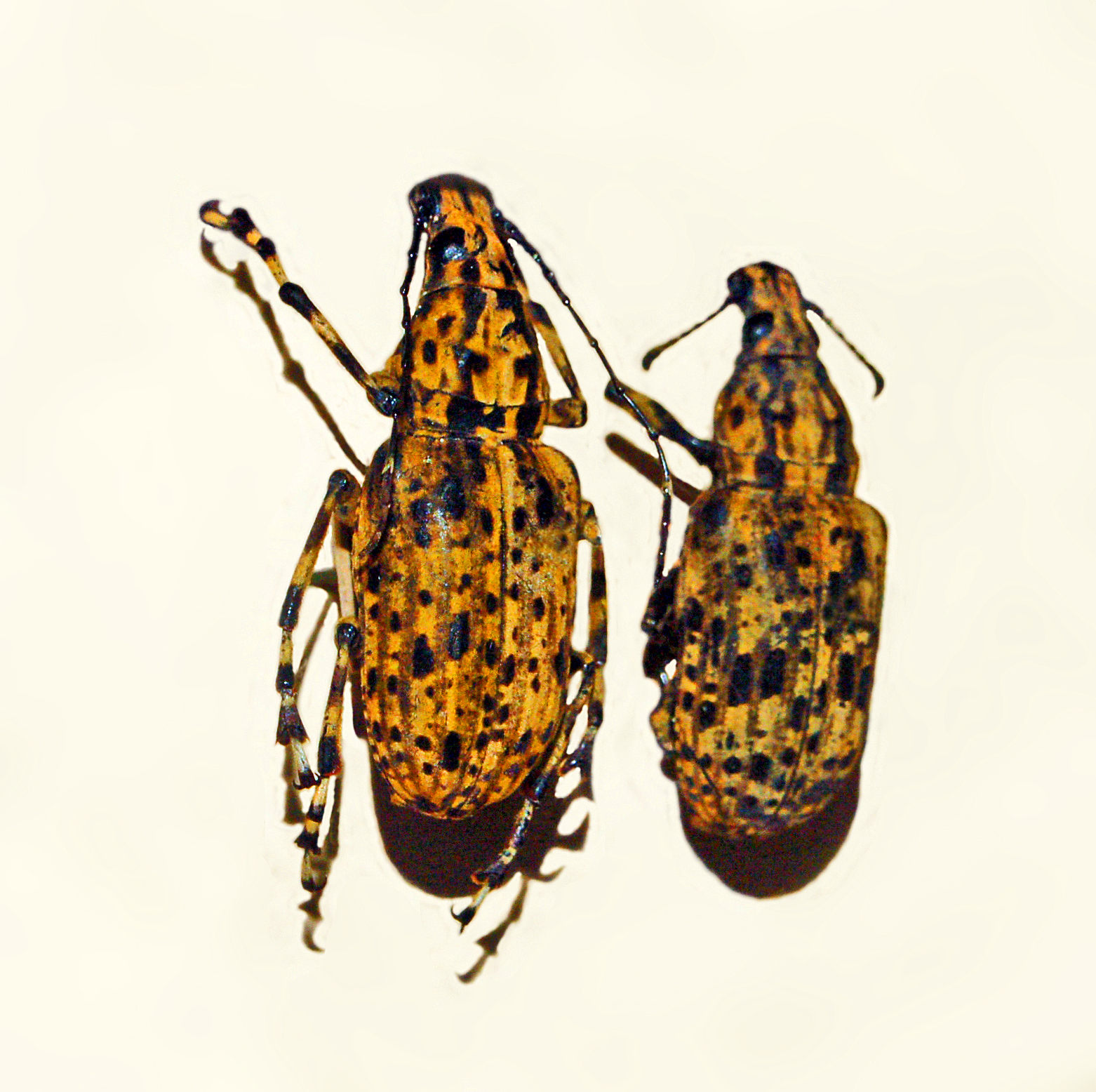
- Meganthribus pupa from New Guinea. Male and female

Scientific classification
- Kingdom: Animalia
- Phylum: Arthropoda
- Class: Insecta
- Order: Coleoptera
- Suborder: Polyphaga
- Infraorder: Cucujiformia
- Family: Anthribidae
- Genus: Meganthribus
- Species: M. pupa

Binomial name
- Meganthribus pupa Jordan, 1895

= Meganthribus pupa =

Species of beetle

Meganthribus pupa is a species of beetles belonging to the Anthribidae family.

== Description ==
Meganthribus pupa reaches a length of about 30 millimetres (1.2 in). The basic colour is pale brown with dark brown or black markings.

== Distribution ==
This species occurs in Papua New Guinea and Philippines.
