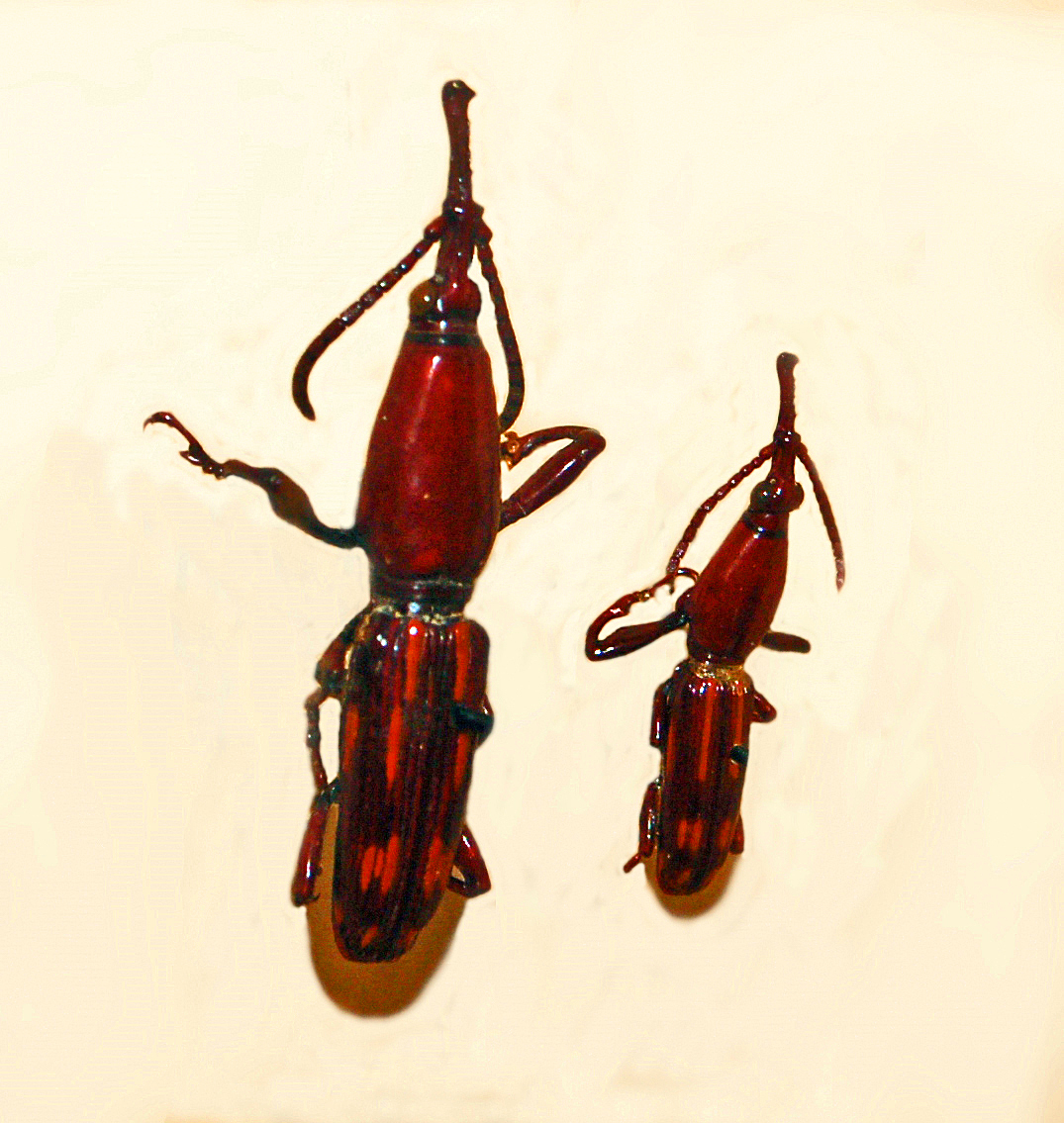
- Orychodes digramma from Papua New Guinea

Scientific classification
- Kingdom: Animalia
- Phylum: Arthropoda
- Clade: Pancrustacea
- Class: Insecta
- Order: Coleoptera
- Suborder: Polyphaga
- Infraorder: Cucujiformia
- Family: Brentidae
- Genus: Orychodes
- Species: O. digramma

Binomial name
- Orychodes digramma (Boisduval, 1835)

= Orychodes digramma =

Species of beetle

Orychodes digramma is a species of Brentidae family. It occurs in Papua New Guinea. It was first described in 1835 by Jean Baptiste Boisduval within Arrhenodes. it is currently accepted under the genus Orychodes.
