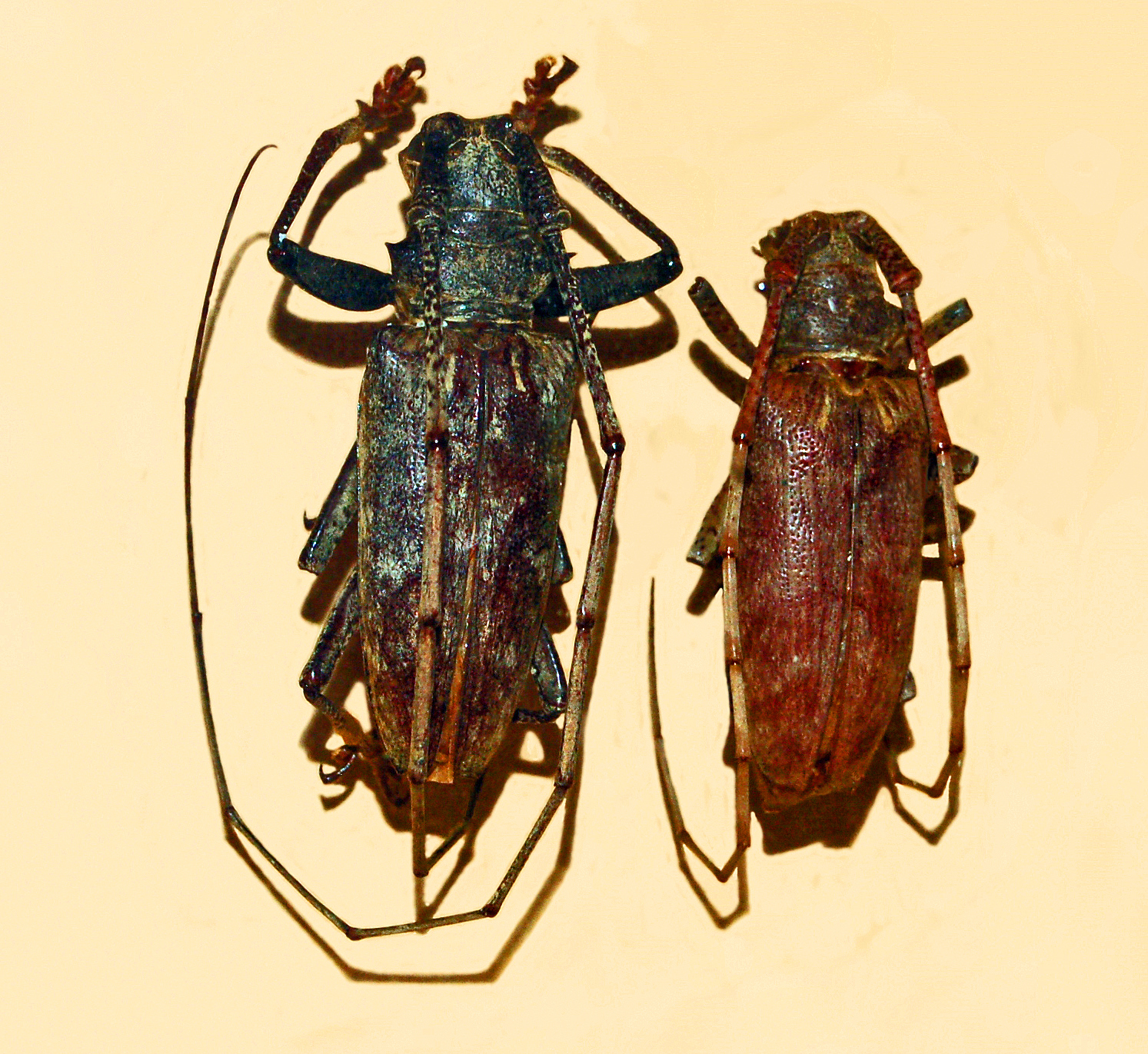
- Acalolepta australis from New Guinea. Male and female

Scientific classification
- Kingdom: Animalia
- Phylum: Arthropoda
- Class: Insecta
- Order: Coleoptera
- Suborder: Polyphaga
- Infraorder: Cucujiformia
- Family: Cerambycidae
- Genus: Acalolepta
- Species: A. australis

Binomial name
- Acalolepta australis (Boisduval, 1835)

Synonyms
- Dihammus australis (Boisduval) Breuning, 1944; Dihammus longicornis (Thomson) Thomson, 1864; Dihammus rex Kriesche, 1940; Monochamus australis Boisduval, 1835; Monochamus longicornis Thomson, 1857

= Acalolepta australis =

Species of beetle

Acalolepta australis is a species of flat-faced longhorn beetle belonging to the family Cerambycidae, subfamily Lamiinae.

== Description ==
Acalolepta australis is the largest species of the genus, reaching about 26–44 millimetres (1.0–1.7 in) in length. The basic colour is blackish or reddish brown. Antennomeres I-III and the base of tibias show black spots.

Main host plants are Anisoptera polyandra, Araucaria cunninghamii, Hevea brasiliensis, Terminalia kaernbachii and Theobroma cacao.

== Distribution ==
This species can be found in northern Australia, Moluccas, New Ireland (island), New Britain and New Guinea.

== List of subspecies ==
- Acalolepta australis australis (Boisduval, 1835)
- Acalolepta australis keyensis Breuning, 1965
- Acalolepta australis orientalis Breuning, 1982
- Acalolepta australis parcepuncticollis Breuning, 1973
- Acalolepta australis saintaignani Breuning, 1970
