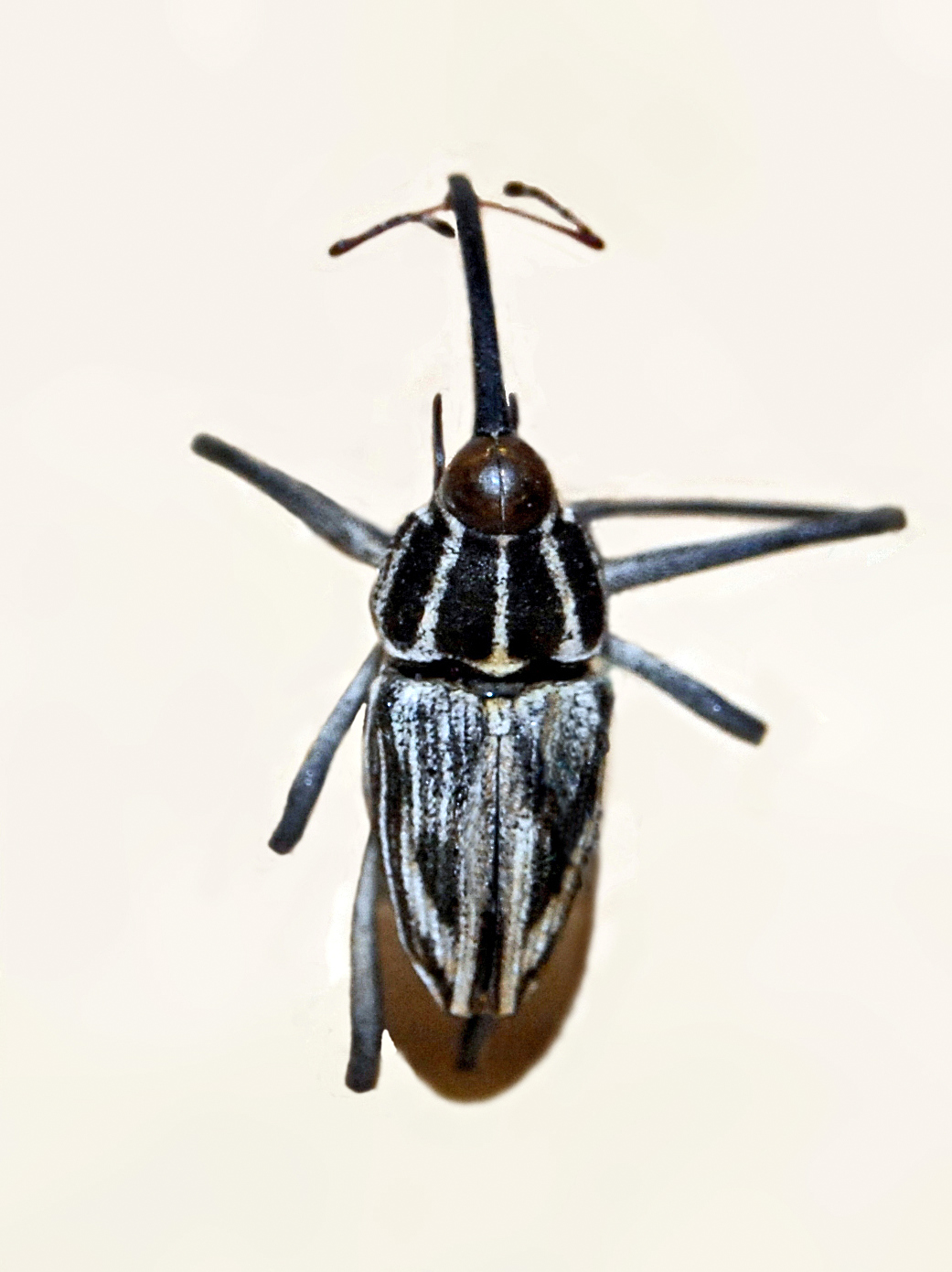
- Mecopus doryphorus from New Guinea

Scientific classification
- Kingdom: Animalia
- Phylum: Arthropoda
- Clade: Pancrustacea
- Class: Insecta
- Order: Coleoptera
- Suborder: Polyphaga
- Infraorder: Cucujiformia
- Superfamily: Curculionoidea
- Family: Curculionidae
- Subfamily: Conoderinae
- Tribe: Mecopini
- Genus: Mecopus
- Species: M. doryphorus

Binomial name
- Mecopus doryphorus Quoy & Gaimard, 1824

= Mecopus doryphorus =

Species of beetle

Mecopus doryphorus is a species of true weevil family.

== Distribution ==
This species occurs in Papua New Guinea.
