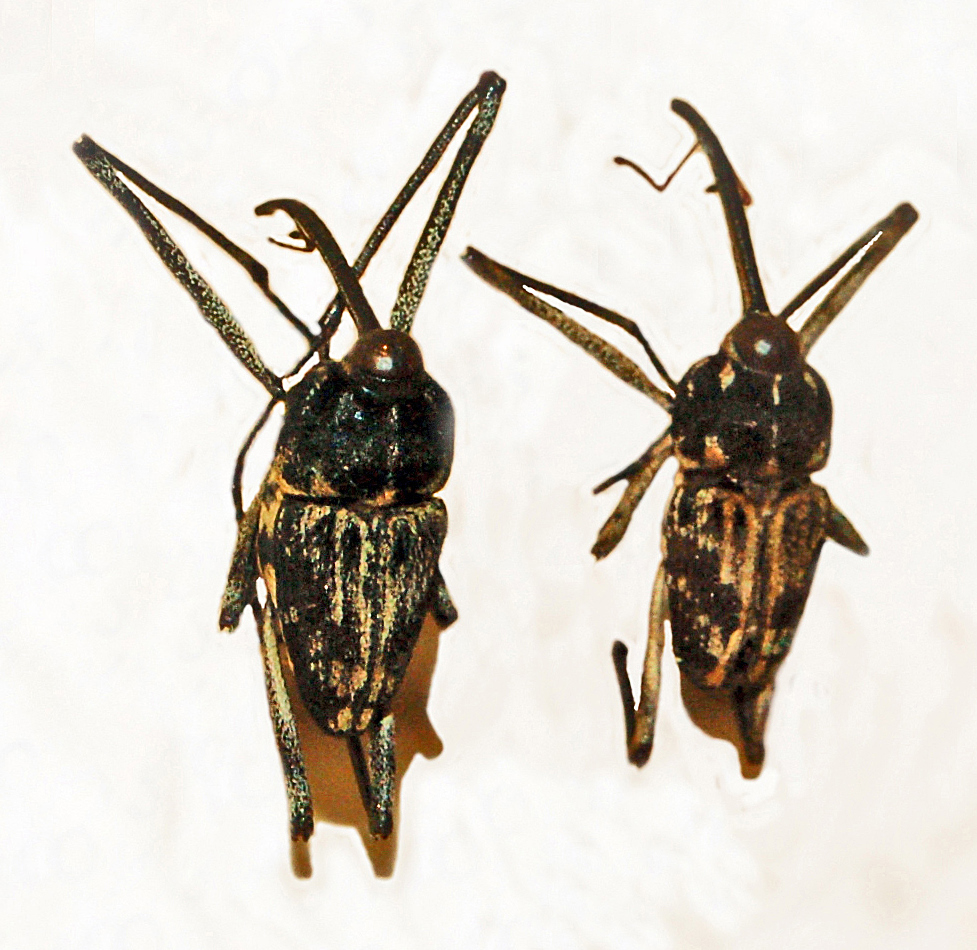
- Mecopus bispinosus from Maluku Islands. Male and female

Scientific classification
- Domain: Eukaryota
- Kingdom: Animalia
- Phylum: Arthropoda
- Class: Insecta
- Order: Coleoptera
- Suborder: Polyphaga
- Infraorder: Cucujiformia
- Family: Curculionidae
- Subfamily: Conoderinae
- Tribe: Mecopini
- Genus: Mecopus
- Species: M. bispinosus

Binomial name
- Mecopus bispinosus Weber, 1801

= Mecopus bispinosus =

Species of beetle

Mecopus bispinosus is a species of true weevil family.

== Description ==
Mecopus bispinosus reaches about 8 millimetres (0.31 in) in length.

== Distribution ==
This species occurs in Papua New Guinea.
