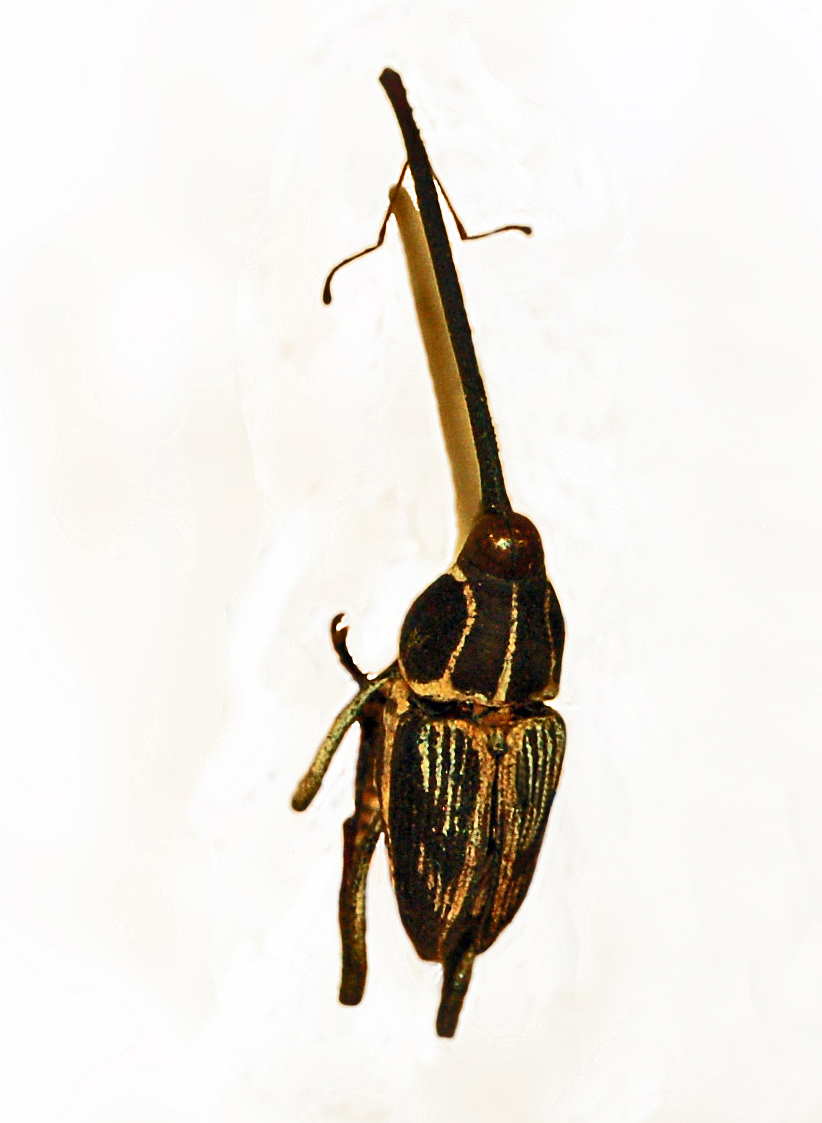
- Mecopus serrirostris from New Guinea. Male

Scientific classification
- Domain: Eukaryota
- Kingdom: Animalia
- Phylum: Arthropoda
- Class: Insecta
- Order: Coleoptera
- Suborder: Polyphaga
- Infraorder: Cucujiformia
- Family: Curculionidae
- Subfamily: Conoderinae
- Tribe: Mecopini
- Genus: Mecopus
- Species: M. serrirostris

Binomial name
- Mecopus serrirostris Pascoe, 1871

= Mecopus serrirostris =

Species of beetle

Mecopus serrirostris is a species of true weevil family.

== Description ==
Mecopus serrirostris reaches about 8 millimetres (0.31 in) in length.

== Distribution ==
This species occurs only in Papua New Guinea.
