= List of Smicronyx species =

These 225 species belong to Smicronyx, a genus of true weevils in the family Curculionidae.

== Smicronyx species ==
- Smicronyx abnormis Dietz, 1894
- Smicronyx adjamati Haran, 2018
- Smicronyx albidosquamosus Klima, 1934
- Smicronyx albofasciatus Chevrolat, 1879
- Smicronyx albonotatus Anderson, 1962
- Smicronyx albopictus Faust, 1882
- Smicronyx albosignatus Suffrian, 1871
- Smicronyx albosquamosus Wollaston, 1854
- Smicronyx albovariegatus Faust, 1891
- Smicronyx alfierii Pic, 1913
- Smicronyx amoenus (Say, T., 1832)
- Smicronyx angolanus Hustache, 1936
- Smicronyx angusticollis Fairmaire, 1875
- Smicronyx angustus Fairmaire, 1875
- Smicronyx anthracinus Faust, 1898
- Smicronyx apionides Casey, 1892
- Smicronyx argentinensis Hustache, 1939
- Smicronyx armipes Voss, 1962
- Smicronyx atratus Dietz, 1894
- Smicronyx australis Haran, 2021
- Smicronyx balassogloi Faust, 1885
- Smicronyx basalis Schultze, 1897
- Smicronyx bipunctatus Karasjov & Okrajko, 1998
- Smicronyx bisignatus Hoffmann, 1968
- Smicronyx bituberculatus Faust, 1898
- Smicronyx brenskei Faust, 1887
- Smicronyx brevicornis Solari, 1953
- Smicronyx buchnerae Haran, 2018
- Smicronyx caecus Schoenherr, 1843
- Smicronyx californicus Dietz, 1894
- Smicronyx caseyi Blatchley, 1916
- Smicronyx cataphractus Champion, 1902
- Smicronyx centralis Anderson, 1962
- Smicronyx centropustulatus Faust, 1891
- Smicronyx championi Fowler, 1890
- Smicronyx chilensis Kuschel, 1952
- Smicronyx cicur
- Smicronyx cinerascens Dietz, 1894
- Smicronyx cinereus Motschulsky, 1845
- Smicronyx clavofulva Hoffmann, 1962
- Smicronyx coecus (Reich, G.C., 1797)
- Smicronyx cognatus Dietz, 1894
- Smicronyx columbianus Dietz, 1894
- Smicronyx commixtus Dietz, 1894
- Smicronyx compar Anderson, 1962
- Smicronyx congestus Casey, 1892
- Smicronyx connivens Casey, 1892
- Smicronyx conspersus Dejean, 1836
- Smicronyx constrictus (Say, T., 1824)
- Smicronyx convexus Anderson, 1962
- Smicronyx corniculatus LeConte, 1876
- Smicronyx corpulentus LeConte, 1876
- Smicronyx corsicus Fairmaire, 1861
- Smicronyx crassithorax Haran, 2018
- Smicronyx cretaceus Tournier, 1874
- Smicronyx cuscutae Marshall, 1922
- Smicronyx cuscutiflorae Pierce, 1939
- Smicronyx cyaneus Schoenherr, 1843
- Smicronyx defricans Casey, 1892
- Smicronyx dentirostris Morimoto & Lee, 1992
- Smicronyx desbrochersi Klima, 1934
- Smicronyx dietzi Klima, 1934
- Smicronyx discoideus Casey, 1892
- Smicronyx dorsomaculatus Cox in Anderson & Cox, 1997
- Smicronyx drakensbergensis Haran, 2021
- Smicronyx erichsonii Hochhuth, 1847
- Smicronyx fallaciosus Klima, 1934
- Smicronyx fallax Dietz, 1894
- Smicronyx fasciatus Desbrochers, 1896
- Smicronyx fiducialis Casey, 1892
- Smicronyx flavicans LeConte, 1876
- Smicronyx floridanus Anderson, 1962
- Smicronyx fraterculus Dietz, 1894
- Smicronyx fulvipes Reiche, 1858
- Smicronyx fulvus LeConte, 1876
- Smicronyx funebris Tournier, 1874
- Smicronyx gentianae Morimoto & Kojima, 2007
- Smicronyx ghanii Anderson, 1974
- Smicronyx gibbirostris Casey, 1892
- Smicronyx giganteus Hustache, 1935
- Smicronyx gossypii Marshall, 1942
- Smicronyx gracilipes Haran, 2021
- Smicronyx gratiosus Solari, 1953
- Smicronyx griseus LeConte, 1876
- Smicronyx guineanus Voss, 1956
- Smicronyx halophilus Blatchley, 1920
- Smicronyx helenae Karasjov & Okrajko, 1998
- Smicronyx humilis Anderson, 1962
- Smicronyx imbricatus Casey, 1892
- Smicronyx immaculatus Anderson, 1962
- Smicronyx impressirostris Dietz, 1894
- Smicronyx incertus Anderson, 1962
- Smicronyx inornatus Anderson, 1974
- Smicronyx instabilis Casey, 1892
- Smicronyx interruptus Blatchley & Leng, 1916
- Smicronyx intricatus Casey, 1892
- Smicronyx italica Voss, 1953
- Smicronyx japonicus Morimoto & Matoba, 2009
- Smicronyx jordanicus
- Smicronyx jungermanniae (Reich, G.C., 1797)
- Smicronyx kenyanus Haran, 2018
- Smicronyx kiboanus Voss, 1971
- Smicronyx kiesenwetteri Tournier, 1874
- Smicronyx krausei Karasjov & Okrajko, 1998
- Smicronyx kubanicus Reitter, 1888
- Smicronyx languidulus Dietz, 1894
- Smicronyx lanuginosus Dietz, 1894
- Smicronyx latisquamis Champion, 1910
- Smicronyx leonardii Karasjov & Okrajko, 1998
- Smicronyx lepidus Dietz, 1894
- Smicronyx lineolatus Casey, 1892
- Smicronyx longinotus Karasjov & Okrajko, 1998
- Smicronyx longitarsis Haran
- Smicronyx loricatus Champion, 1902
- Smicronyx lutulentus Dietz, 1894
- Smicronyx mackenziei Sleeper, 1955
- Smicronyx maculatus Dietz, 1894
- Smicronyx madaranus Kôno, 1930
- Smicronyx maerens Marshall, 1940
- Smicronyx marmoratus Rey, 1893
- Smicronyx menozzii Solari, 1953
- Smicronyx metallescens Caldara, 1990
- Smicronyx minutissimus Blatchley, 1928
- Smicronyx modestus Tournier, 1874
- Smicronyx morio Dietz, 1894
- Smicronyx mucidus Dietz, 1894
- Smicronyx namibicus Haran, 2018
- Smicronyx nebulosus Tournier, 1874
- Smicronyx nubilus Dietz, 1894
- Smicronyx obrieni Anderson, Korotyaev & Lingafelter, 2006
- Smicronyx obscurus Anderson, 1962
- Smicronyx obtectus LeConte, 1876
- Smicronyx opacus Brisout Ch., 1860
- Smicronyx orientalis Karasjov & Okrajko, 1998
- Smicronyx ornatipennis Dietz, 1894
- Smicronyx ovipennis LeConte, 1876
- Smicronyx pacificus Anderson, 1962
- Smicronyx pallidus Anderson, 1962
- Smicronyx parafasciatus Anderson, 1974
- Smicronyx parcus Dietz, 1894
- Smicronyx paucisquamis Haran, 2021
- Smicronyx pauperculus Wollaston, 1864
- Smicronyx perfidus Dietz, 1894
- Smicronyx perplexus Dietz, 1894
- Smicronyx perpusillus Casey, 1892
- Smicronyx picipes Dietz, 1894
- Smicronyx pinguis Blatchley & Leng, 1916
- Smicronyx pleuralis Casey, 1892
- Smicronyx politus Boheman, 1843
- Smicronyx porrectus (Boheman, 1843)
- Smicronyx posticus Dietz, 1894
- Smicronyx praecox Faust, 1885
- Smicronyx profusus Casey, 1892
- Smicronyx pseudocoecus Haran, 2021
- Smicronyx punctatus Desbrochers, 1896
- Smicronyx puncticollis Tournier, 1874
- Smicronyx pusillus Dietz, 1894
- Smicronyx pusio LeConte, 1876
- Smicronyx quadrifer Casey, 1892
- Smicronyx quadrituberculatus Hustache, 1936
- Smicronyx rectirostris Blatchley, 1922
- Smicronyx reichei Schoenherr, 1843
- Smicronyx reichii Gyllenhal, 1835
- Smicronyx remaudierei Hoffmann, 1954
- Smicronyx resplendens Dietz, 1894
- Smicronyx revelierei Tournier, 1874
- Smicronyx rhodopus Dietz, 1894
- Smicronyx robustus Faust, 1885
- Smicronyx roridus Marshall, 1952
- Smicronyx rubricatus Kôno, 1930
- Smicronyx rudicollis Fairmaire, 1875
- Smicronyx rufipennis Tournier, 1874
- Smicronyx rufipes Kiesenwetter, 1864
- Smicronyx rufovittatus Anderson, 1974
- Smicronyx rufulus Dietz, 1894
- Smicronyx rufus Haran, 2018
- Smicronyx rugicollis Rey, 1893
- Smicronyx rusticus Dietz, 1894
- Smicronyx sagittatus Casey, 1892
- Smicronyx san Haran, 2021
- Smicronyx scalator Dietz, 1894
- Smicronyx scapalis (LeConte, 1876)
- Smicronyx scops Tournier, 1874
- Smicronyx sculpticollis Casey, 1892
- Smicronyx seriatus LeConte, 1876
- Smicronyx seriepilosus Tournier, 1874
- Smicronyx setulosus Dietz, 1894
- Smicronyx silaceus Casey, 1892
- Smicronyx similis Haran, 2021
- Smicronyx smreczynskii Solari, 1953
- Smicronyx sopubiae Marshall, 1940
- Smicronyx sordidus LeConte, 1876
- Smicronyx sparsus Casey, 1892
- Smicronyx spretus Dietz, 1894
- Smicronyx spureus Casey, 1892
- Smicronyx squalidus Casey, 1892
- Smicronyx squamulatus LeConte, 1876
- Smicronyx striatipennis Tournier, 1874
- Smicronyx swertiae Voss, 1953
- Smicronyx syriacus Faust, 1887
- Smicronyx tardus Dietz, 1894
- Smicronyx tataricus Faust, 1886
- Smicronyx tectus Champion, 1902
- Smicronyx tenuirostris Champion, 1902
- Smicronyx tenuisquamis Champion, 1902
- Smicronyx teselatus Dietz, 1894
- Smicronyx tessellatus Klima, 1934
- Smicronyx texana Blatchley, 1916
- Smicronyx thoracatus Champion, 1902
- Smicronyx triangularis (Dietz, 1894)
- Smicronyx tunicensis Desbrochers, 1898
- Smicronyx turkestanicus Karasyov, 1995
- Smicronyx tychioides LeConte, 1876
- Smicronyx umbrinus Hustache, 1947
- Smicronyx ushoensis Anderson, 1974
- Smicronyx utilis Buchanan, 1941
- Smicronyx vallium Kuschel, 1949
- Smicronyx variegatus Schoenherr, 1843
- Smicronyx varipilis Fairmaire, 1875
- Smicronyx vestitus Casey, 1892
- Smicronyx vitiosus Dietz, 1894
- Smicronyx zambianus Haran, 2018
- Smicronyx zherichini Karasjov & Okrajko, 1998
- Smicronyx zonatus Haran, 2018
- † Smicronyx antiquus Foerster, B., 1891
