= Fulvous =

Reddish brown color

Colour coordinates
- Hex triplet: #E48400
- sRGB^{B} (r, g, b): (228, 132, 0)
- HSV (h, s, v): (35°, 100%, 89%)
- CIELCh_{uv} (L, C, h): (64, 101, 38°)
- Source: 99colors.net
- ISCC–NBS descriptor: Strong orange
- B: Normalized to [0–255] (byte)

Fulvous (/ˈfʊl.vəs/, FULL-vəss) is a colour, sometimes described as dull orange, brownish-yellow or tawny; it can also be likened to a variation of buff, beige, or butterscotch. As an adjective it is used in the names of many species of birds, and occasionally other animals, to describe their appearance. It is also used as in mycology to describe fungi with greater colour specificity, specifically the pigmentation of the surface cuticle, the broken flesh and the spores en masse.

The first recorded use of fulvous as a colour name in English was in the year 1664. Fulvous in English is derived from the Latin "fulvus", a term that can be recognised in the scientific binomials of several species, and can provide a clue to their colouration.

== Birds ==
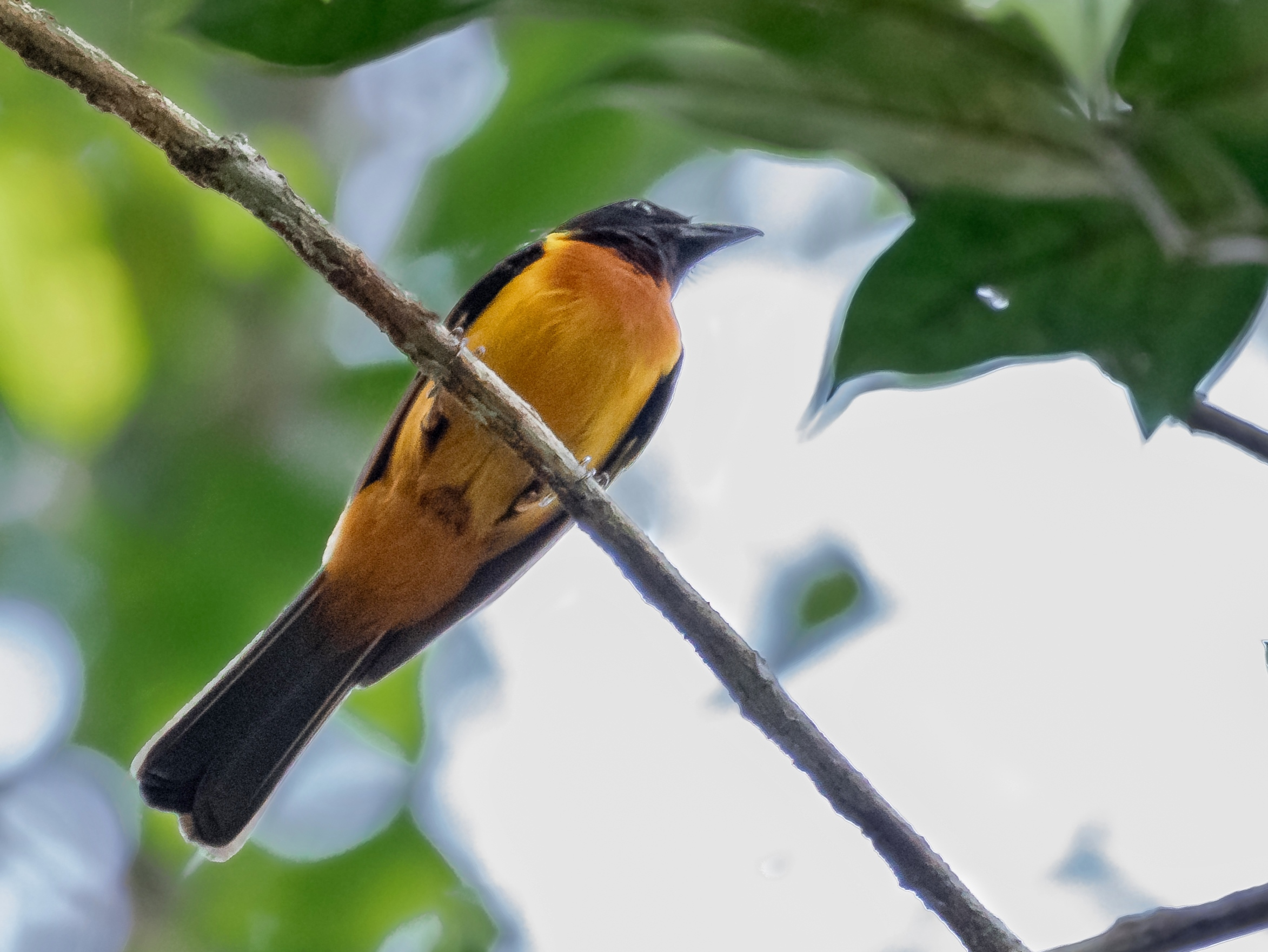
Fulvous shrike-tanager

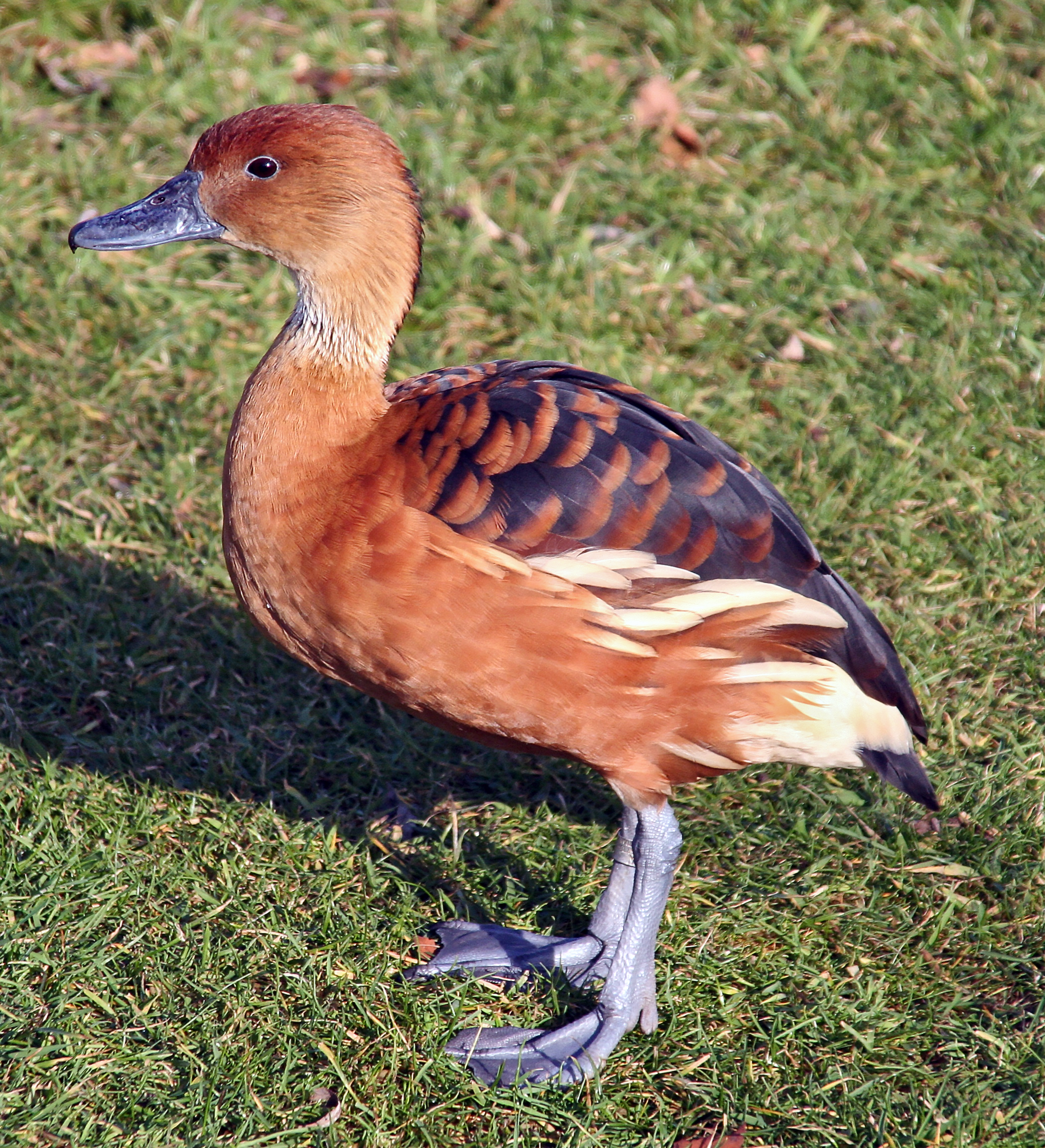
Fulvous whistling duck

- Fulvous babbler
- Fulvous owl
- Fulvous parrotbill
- Fulvous shrike-tanager
- Fulvous whistling duck
- Fulvous wren
- Fulvous-bellied antpitta
- Fulvous-breasted flatbill
- Fulvous-breasted woodpecker
- Fulvous-chested jungle-flycatcher
- Fulvous-chinned nunlet
- Fulvous-crested tanager
- Fulvous-dotted treerunner
- Fulvous-headed brush-finch
- Fulvous-headed tanager
- Fulvous-vented euphonia
- Eurasian griffon vulture (Gyps fulvus)
- Pacific golden plover (Pluvialis fulva)
- Ashy woodpecker (Mulleripicus fulvus)
- Cave swallow (Petrochelidon fulva)

== Reptiles ==
- Highland garter snake (Thamnophis fulvus)

== Mammals ==
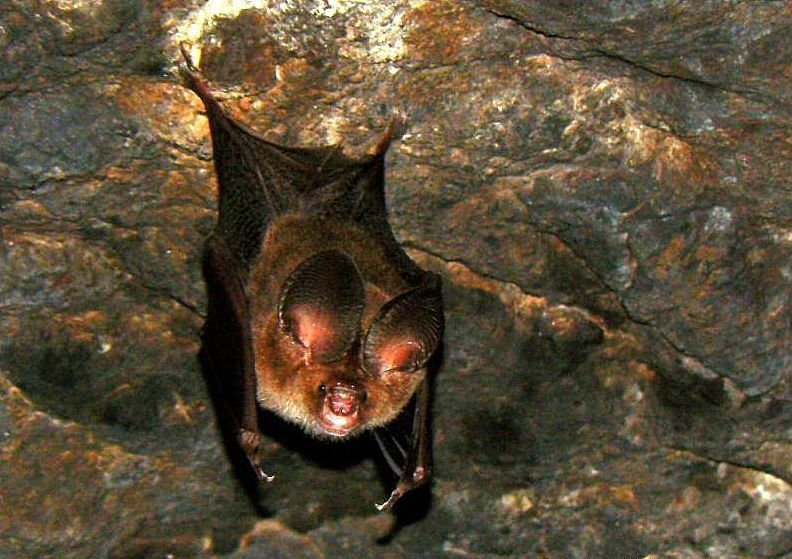
Fulvus roundleaf bat

- Fulvous harvest mouse
- Fulvous pygmy rice rat
- Fulvous-bellied climbing rat
- Fulvus roundleaf bat
- Common brown lemur (Eulemur fulvus)
- Yellow ground squirrel (Spermophilus fulvus)
- American red fox (Vulpes vulpes fulva)

== Fish ==
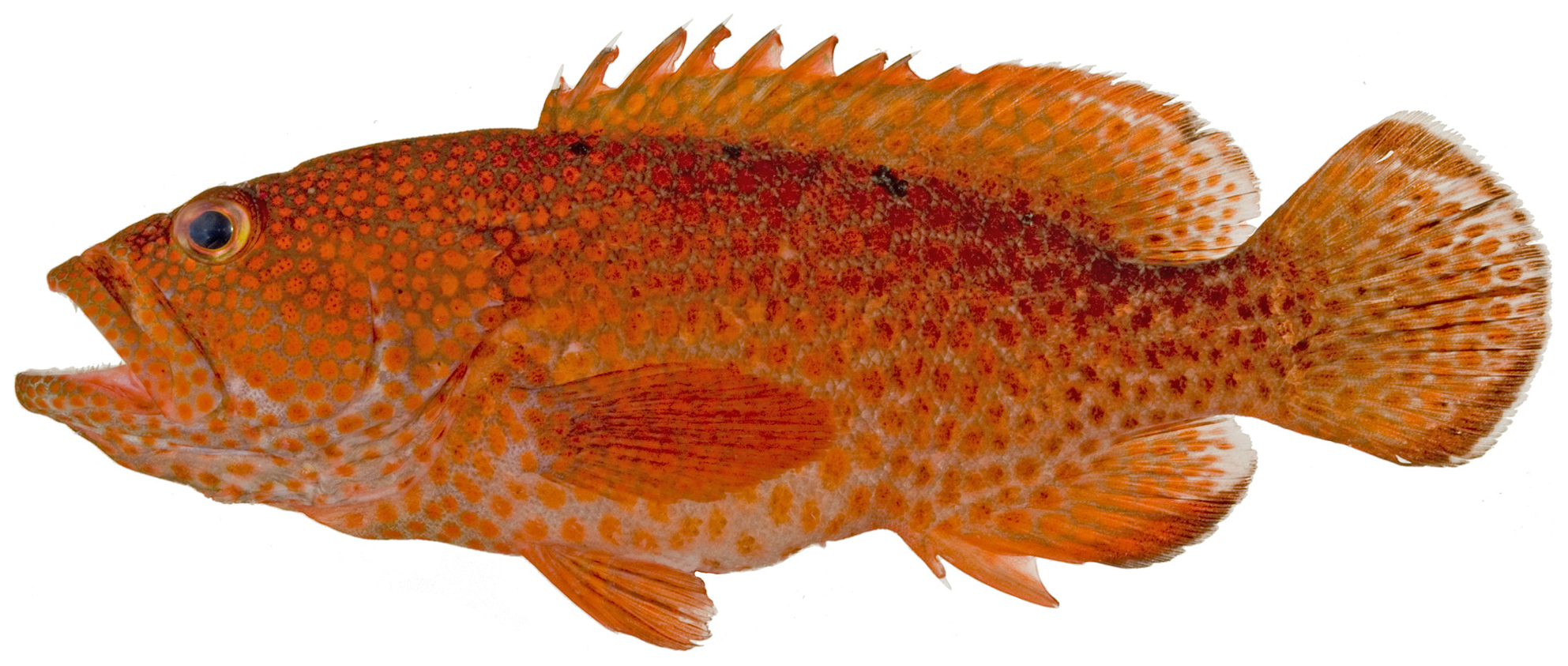
Butterfish

- Cephalopholis fulva, coney or butterfish
- Starksia fulva, yellow blenny

== Invertebrates ==
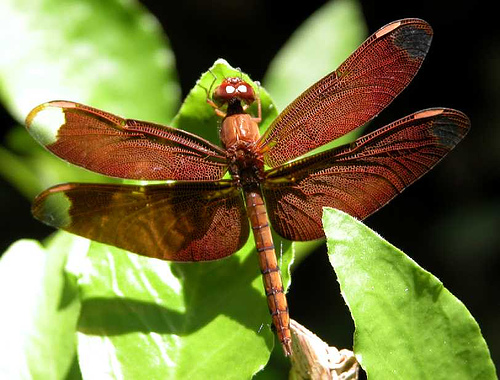
Fulvous forest skimmer – a dragonfly found in India

- Fulvous dawnfly
- Fulvous forest skimmer
- Dorylus fulvus, a West African ant
- Technomyrmex fulvus, a Central American ant
- Nylanderia fulva, a South American ant
- Paratrechina fulva, a South American ant
- Aphaenogaster fulva, a nearctic American ant
- Smicronyx fulvus, a sunflower seed weevil
- Tigriopus fulvus, a marine copepod
- Menemerus fulvus, a Japanese jumping spider
- Megahexura fulva, the tawny dwarf tarantula
- Euconulus fulvus, a New Zealand land snail
- Rhagonycha fulva, the common red soldier beetle
- Libellula fulva, the scarce chaser; a British dragon fly
- Aplysina fulva, a scattered pore rope sponge

== Fungi ==
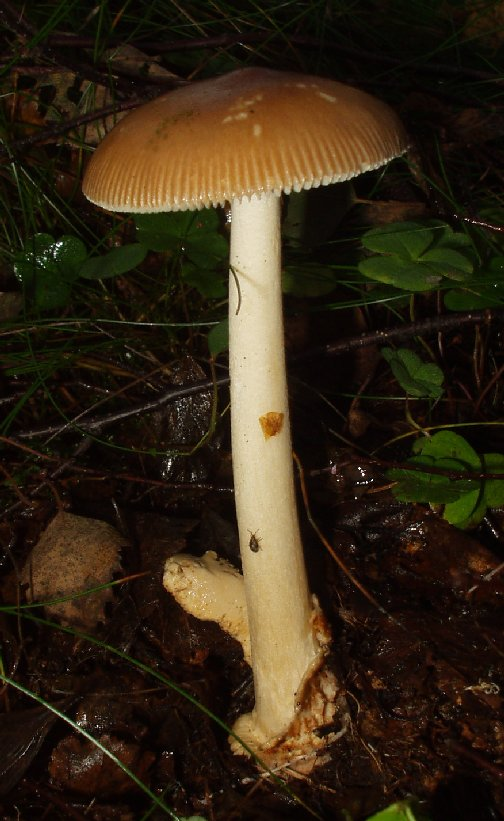
Amanita fulva

- Fomes fulvus, a North American conk
- Amanita fulva
- Mycovellosiella fulva, a plant pathogen
- Byssochlamys fulva, a plant pathogen
- Cladosporium fulvum, a plant pathogen
- Xanthoria fulva, a lichen

== Prokaryotes ==
- Myxococcus fulvus
- Pseudomonas fulva

== Plants ==
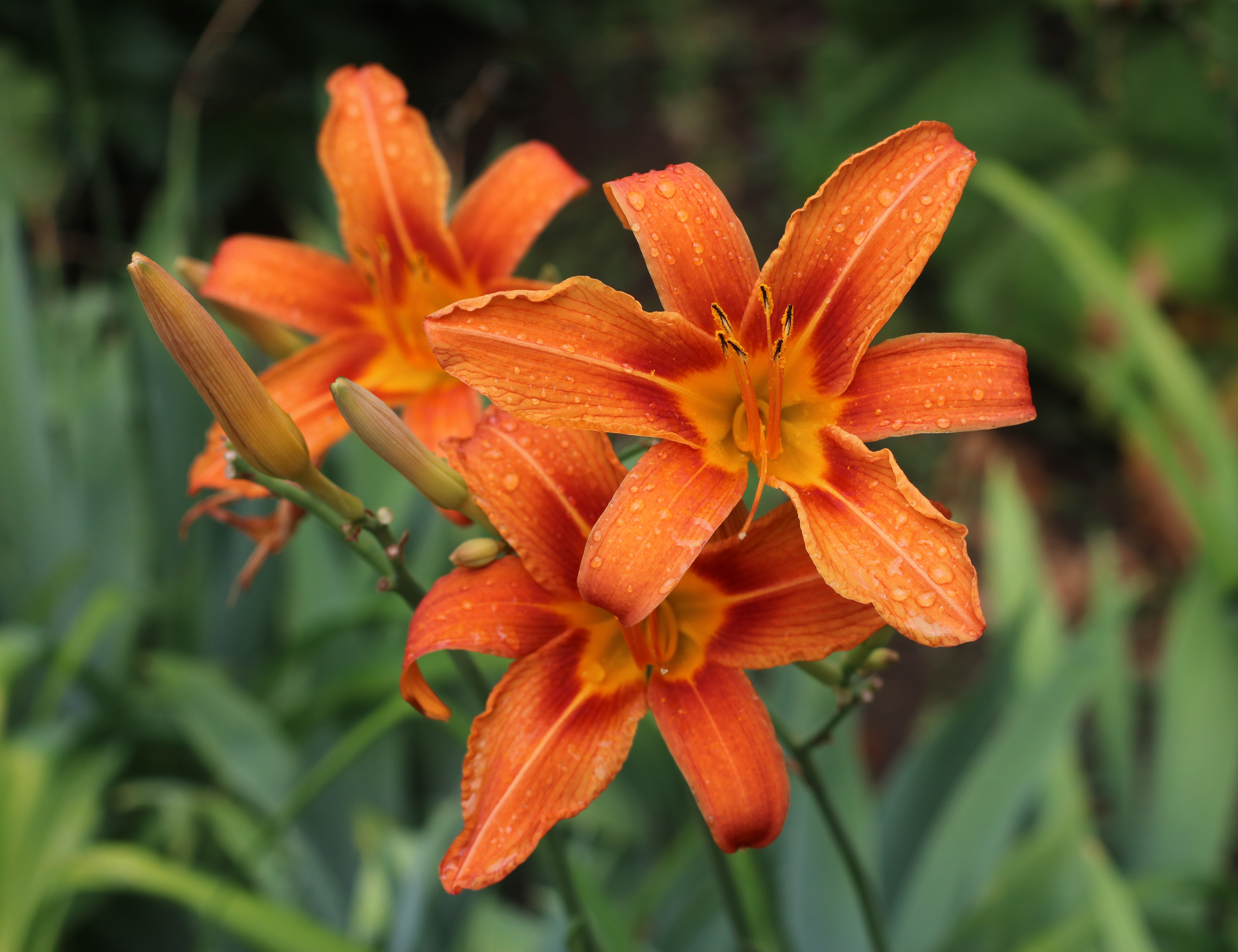
The tawny daylily's scientific name is Hemerocallis fulva

- Plagiobothrys fulvus, fulvous popcorn flower
- Chrysopogon fulvus, red false beardgrass
- Hemerocallis fulva, tawny daylily
- Iris fulva, copper iris
- Polyscias fulva a West African parasol tree
- Ulmus fulva, slippery elm
- Quercus fulva, an endemic Mexican oak
- Utricularia fulva, an Australian carnivorous plant
- Livistona fulva, a palm having fronds with golden undersides
- Madhuca fulva, a threatened tree endemic to Sri Lanka
- Arachnorchis fulva, the tawny spider-orchid
- Arctophila fulva, arctic march grass

== See also ==
- Animal colouration
- List of colours
