= Smicronyx tesselatus =

Scientific classification
- Domain: Eukaryota
- Kingdom: Animalia
- Phylum: Arthropoda
- Class: Insecta
- Order: Coleoptera
- Suborder: Polyphaga
- Infraorder: Cucujiformia
- Family: Curculionidae
- Genus: Smicronyx
- Species: S. tesselatus

Binomial name
- Smicronyx tesselatus Dietz, 1894

Synonyms
- Smicronyx impressirostris Dietz, 1894

Species of beetle

Smicronyx tesselatus is a species of true weevil in the beetle family Curculionidae.
