= Trichobaris texana =

Scientific classification
- Kingdom: Animalia
- Phylum: Arthropoda
- Class: Insecta
- Order: Coleoptera
- Suborder: Polyphaga
- Infraorder: Cucujiformia
- Family: Curculionidae
- Genus: Trichobaris
- Species: T. texana

Binomial name
- Trichobaris texana LeConte, 1876

Species of beetle

Trichobaris texana is a subjective junior synonym of Trichobaris pellicea (Boheman, 1844).
