= Smicronyx incertus =

Scientific classification
- Domain: Eukaryota
- Kingdom: Animalia
- Phylum: Arthropoda
- Class: Insecta
- Order: Coleoptera
- Suborder: Polyphaga
- Infraorder: Cucujiformia
- Family: Curculionidae
- Genus: Smicronyx
- Species: S. incertus

Binomial name
- Smicronyx incertus (Dietz, 1894)

Synonyms
- Smicronyx rusticus Dietz, 1894; Smicronyx vitiosus Dietz, 1894

Species of beetle

Smicronyx incertus is a species of true weevil in the beetle family Curculionidae. It is found in North America.
