= Smicronyx scapalis =

Scientific classification
- Kingdom: Animalia
- Phylum: Arthropoda
- Class: Insecta
- Order: Coleoptera
- Suborder: Polyphaga
- Infraorder: Cucujiformia
- Family: Curculionidae
- Genus: Smicronyx
- Species: S. scapalis

Binomial name
- Smicronyx scapalis (LeConte, 1876)

Species of beetle

Smicronyx scapalis is a species of true weevil in the beetle family Curculionidae.
