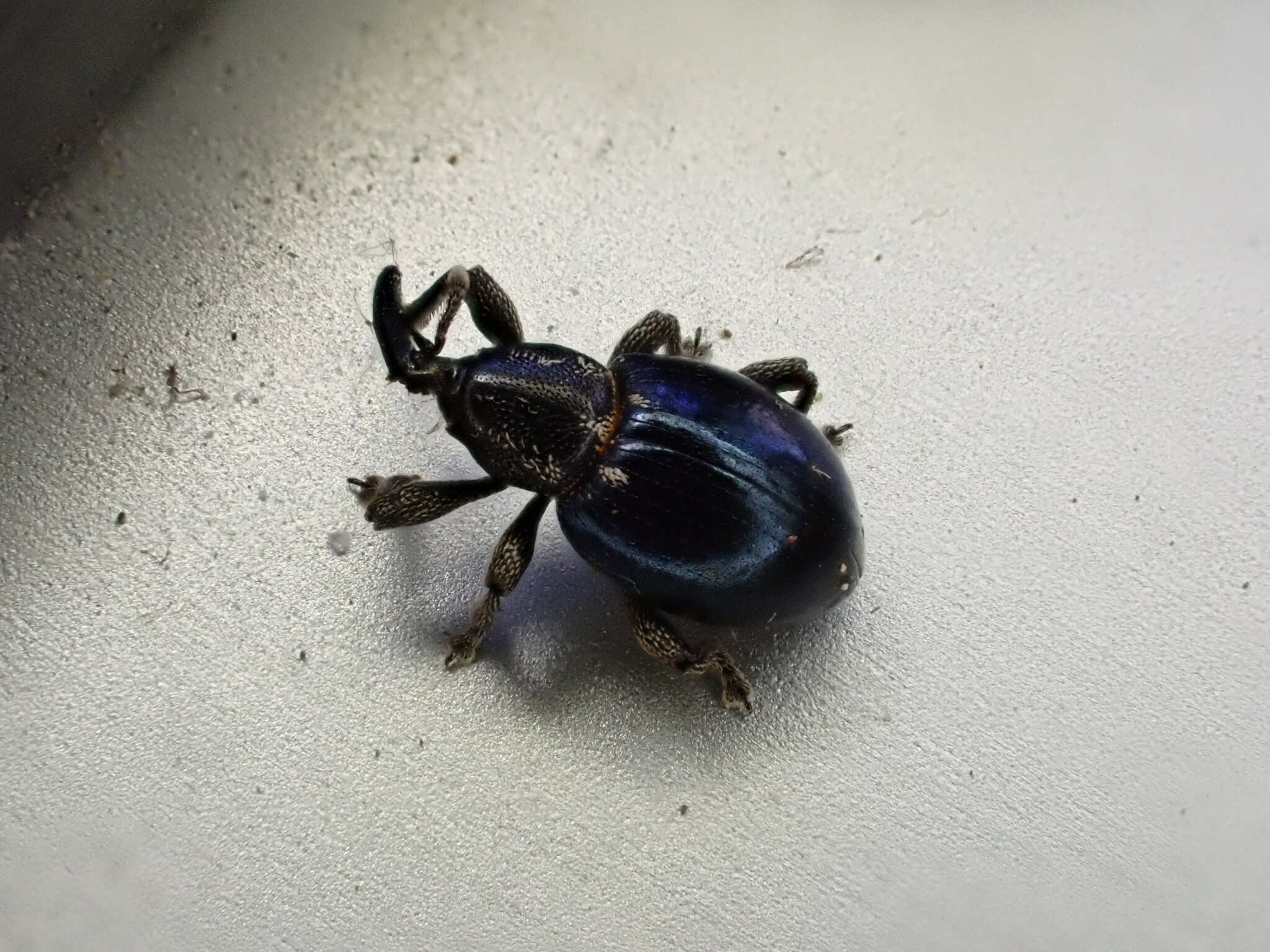
- Smicronyx cyaneus, France

Scientific classification
- Domain: Eukaryota
- Kingdom: Animalia
- Phylum: Arthropoda
- Class: Insecta
- Order: Coleoptera
- Suborder: Polyphaga
- Infraorder: Cucujiformia
- Family: Curculionidae
- Genus: Smicronyx
- Species: S. cyaneus

Binomial name
- Smicronyx cyaneus Schoenherr, 1843

Synonyms
- Micronyx cyaneus Gyllenhal, 1835

= Smicronyx cyaneus =

Species of beetle

Smicronyx cyaneus is a species of beetles in the weevil family Curculionidae, found in southern Europe.
