= Smicronyx corpulentus =

Scientific classification
- Kingdom: Animalia
- Phylum: Arthropoda
- Class: Insecta
- Order: Coleoptera
- Suborder: Polyphaga
- Infraorder: Cucujiformia
- Family: Curculionidae
- Subfamily: Curculioninae
- Genus: Smicronyx
- Species: S. corpulentus

Binomial name
- Smicronyx corpulentus LeConte, 1876

Species of beetle

Smicronyx corpulentus is a species in the family Curculionidae ("snout and bark beetles"), in the order Coleoptera ("beetles"). Smicronyx corpulentus is found in North America.
