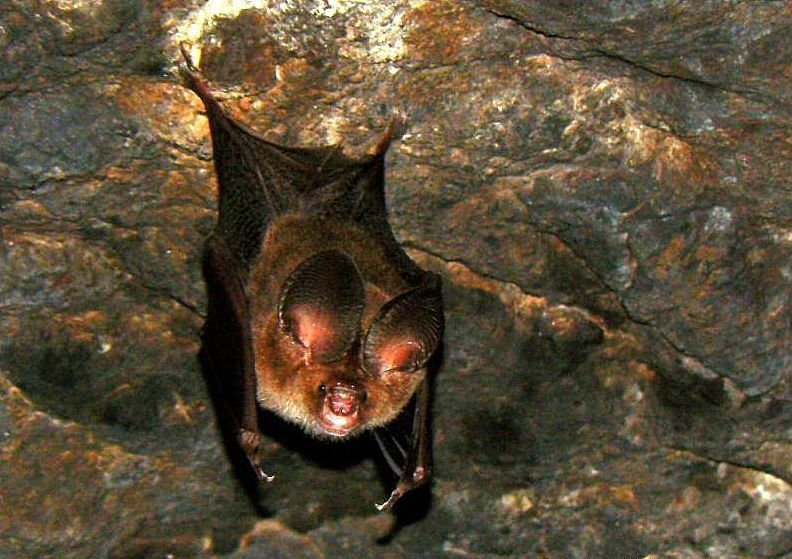
- Location: Manpeshwar CaveDahisar, Mumbai

Conservation status
- Least Concern (IUCN 3.1)

Scientific classification
- Kingdom: Animalia
- Phylum: Chordata
- Class: Mammalia
- Order: Chiroptera
- Family: Hipposideridae
- Genus: Macronycteris
- Species: H. fulvus

Binomial name
- Hipposideros fulvus Gray, 1838
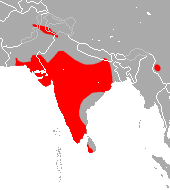
- Fulvus roundleaf bat range

= Fulvus roundleaf bat =

Species of mammal

The fulvus roundleaf bat or fulvus leaf-nosed bat (Hipposideros fulvus) is a species of bat in the family Hipposideridae. It is found in Afghanistan, Bangladesh, China, India, Myanmar, Pakistan, and Sri Lanka.

== Taxonomy ==
The fulvus roundleaf bat was described as a new species in 1838 by British zoologist John Edward Gray. The holotype had been collected by Walter Elliot in the Madras, India (now Chennai). Gray stated that its fur was "reddish fulvous", giving it the species name "fulvus".

== Description ==
Individuals have a forearm length of 38–44 mm (1.5–1.7 in) and weigh 8–9 g (0.28–0.32 oz). It has large ears that are rounded at the tips. Its fur color is variable; individuals have been documented with pale yellow, golden orange, and pale gray fur.

== Range and habitat ==
It is native to Central and South Asia, and has been documented in the following countries: Afghanistan, Bangladesh, China, India, Pakistan, and Sri Lanka. It is found at a range of elevations from 0–2,600 m (0–8,530 ft) above sea level.

== Conservation ==
As of 2019, it is evaluated as a least-concern species by the IUCN. It meets the criteria for this classification because it has a wide—if patchy—geographic range, and it is not likely to be experiencing rapid population decline. It has a low population density, however, and is threatened by disturbance of its roosts.
