= Smicronyx constrictus =

Scientific classification
- Domain: Eukaryota
- Kingdom: Animalia
- Phylum: Arthropoda
- Class: Insecta
- Order: Coleoptera
- Suborder: Polyphaga
- Infraorder: Cucujiformia
- Family: Curculionidae
- Genus: Smicronyx
- Species: S. constrictus

Binomial name
- Smicronyx constrictus (Say, 1824)

Synonyms
- Desmoris pervisus Dietz, 1894

Species of beetle

Smicronyx constrictus is a species of true weevil in the beetle family Curculionidae.
