= Smicronyx imbricatus =

Scientific classification
- Kingdom: Animalia
- Phylum: Arthropoda
- Class: Insecta
- Order: Coleoptera
- Suborder: Polyphaga
- Infraorder: Cucujiformia
- Family: Curculionidae
- Genus: Smicronyx
- Species: S. imbricatus

Binomial name
- Smicronyx imbricatus Casey, 1892

Synonyms
- Synertha hornii Dietz, 1894

Species of beetle

Smicronyx imbricatus is a species of true weevil in the family of beetles known as Curculionidae. It is found in North America.
