= Smicronyx lineolatus =

Scientific classification
- Kingdom: Animalia
- Phylum: Arthropoda
- Clade: Pancrustacea
- Class: Insecta
- Order: Coleoptera
- Suborder: Polyphaga
- Infraorder: Cucujiformia
- Superfamily: Curculionoidea
- Family: Curculionidae
- Genus: Smicronyx
- Species: S. lineolatus

Binomial name
- Smicronyx lineolatus Casey, 1892

Species of beetle

Smicronyx lineolatus is a species of true weevil in the beetle family Curculionidae. It is found in North America.
