= Smicronyx vestitus =

Scientific classification
- Kingdom: Animalia
- Phylum: Arthropoda
- Class: Insecta
- Order: Coleoptera
- Suborder: Polyphaga
- Infraorder: Cucujiformia
- Family: Curculionidae
- Genus: Smicronyx
- Species: S. vestitus

Binomial name
- Smicronyx vestitus LeConte, 1876

Species of beetle

Smicronyx vestitus is a species of true weevil in the beetle family Curculionidae.
