= Nealiolus curculionis =

Scientific classification
- Kingdom: Animalia
- Phylum: Arthropoda
- Class: Insecta
- Order: Hymenoptera
- Family: Braconidae
- Genus: Nealiolus
- Species: N. curculionis

Binomial name
- Nealiolus curculionis (Fitch, 1859)

Synonyms
- Sigalphus curculionis Fitch 1859; Nealiolus inaratus (Martin 1956); Nealiolus tibiator (Cresson 1872)

Species of wasp

Nealiolus curculionis is a species of parasitic wasp in the family Braconidae. It is a parasitoid of the sunflower stem weevil Cylindrocopturus adspersus, and a number of other species of stem-boring weevils.

== Description ==
Nealiolus curculionis has a body length of just under 4 mm (0.16 in). It has an oval shape, a moderately-curved carapace and a transverse clypeus, and the third tergite is finely sculpted with longitudinal lines. The color is basically black apart from the legs, which are brown, the dark brown antennae, the brown clypeus and mandibles, the brown ovipositor and the dark brown tip of the abdomen.

== Distribution ==
This wasp is found in Canada, the United States and Mexico, and has also been recorded in Costa Rica, Guatemala and Venezuela.

== Life cycle ==
This wasp shows a considerable degree of synchronization with its host species. When parasitizing the sunflower stem weevil, the female wasp lays a single egg into a first instar larva, which feeds just under the epidermis of the stem where it is within reach of the wasp's ovipositor. By the winter, the host larva is fully developed and enters diapause in a chamber near the base of the plant. The wasp larva, still contained within its living host, also enters diapause. In the spring, the wasp larva resumes feeding and after about 21 days chews its way out, feeding on the weevil larval carcase before pupating. The adult wasp emerges about ten days later, and is on the wing between June and August, with males emerging a few days before females.

== Hosts ==
In the United States, the sunflower stem weevil (C. adspersus) is the most common host species, but other larvae parasitised include the red sunflower seed weevil (Smicronyx fulvus), the boll weevil (Anthonomus grandis), the plum curculio (Conotrachelus nenuphar), and the potato stalk borer (Trichobaris trinotata). In Mexico, the main insect host is Trichobaris championi, feeding on the Mexican husk tomato (Physalis ixocarpa).
