= Smicronyx ovipennis =

Scientific classification
- Kingdom: Animalia
- Phylum: Arthropoda
- Class: Insecta
- Order: Coleoptera
- Suborder: Polyphaga
- Infraorder: Cucujiformia
- Family: Curculionidae
- Genus: Smicronyx
- Species: S. ovipennis

Binomial name
- Smicronyx ovipennis LeConte, 1876

Synonyms
- Smicronyx setulosus Dietz, 1894

Species of beetle

Smicronyx ovipennis is a species of true weevil in the beetle family Curculionidae. It is found in North America.
