= Smicronyx squalidus =

Scientific classification
- Kingdom: Animalia
- Phylum: Arthropoda
- Class: Insecta
- Order: Coleoptera
- Suborder: Polyphaga
- Infraorder: Cucujiformia
- Family: Curculionidae
- Genus: Smicronyx
- Species: S. squalidus

Binomial name
- Smicronyx squalidus Casey, 1892

Synonyms
- Smicronyx cinerascens Dietz, 1894; Smicronyx morio Dietz, 1894

Species of beetle

Smicronyx squalidus is a species of true weevil in the beetle family Curculionidae. It is found in North America.
