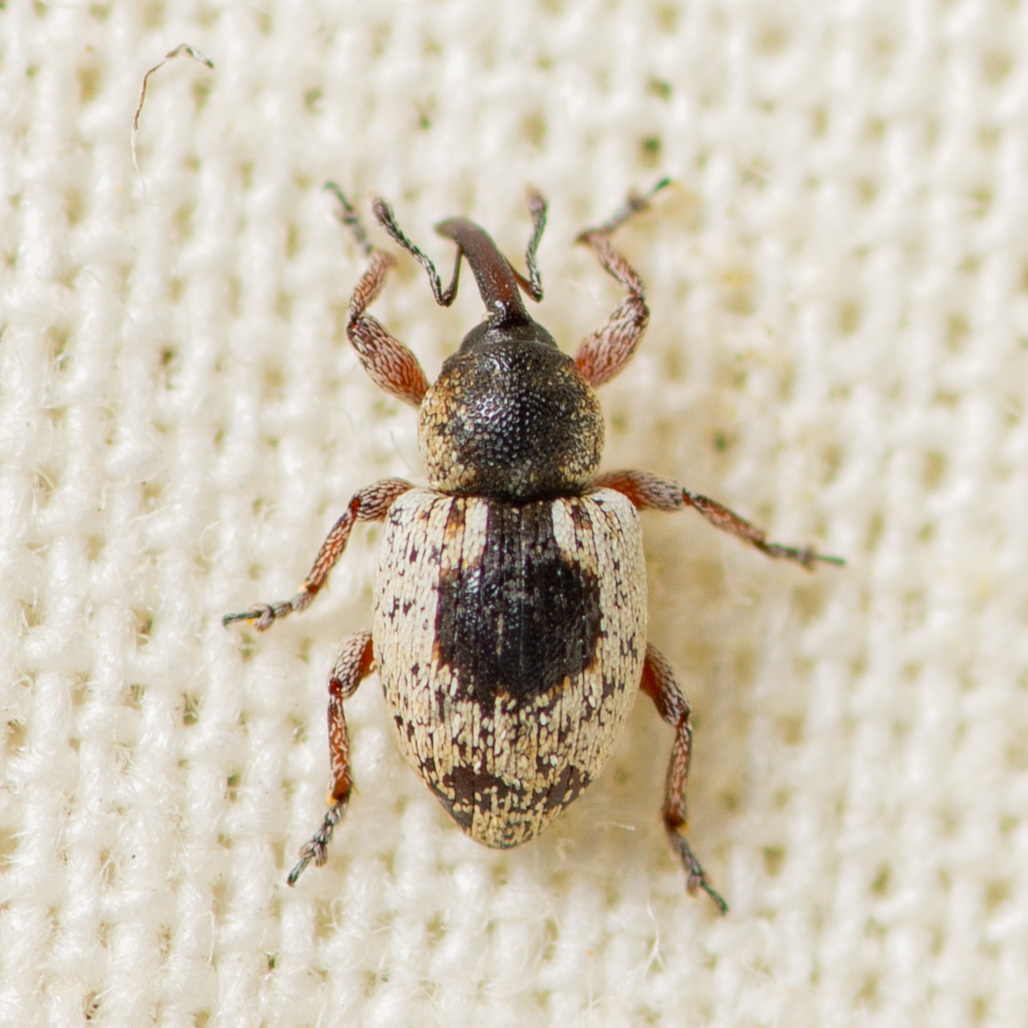
- Smicronyx quadrifer

Scientific classification
- Kingdom: Animalia
- Phylum: Arthropoda
- Class: Insecta
- Order: Coleoptera
- Suborder: Polyphaga
- Infraorder: Cucujiformia
- Family: Curculionidae
- Genus: Smicronyx
- Species: S. quadrifer

Binomial name
- Smicronyx quadrifer Casey, 1892

Synonyms
- Smicronyx texana Blatchley, 1916

= Smicronyx quadrifer =

Species of beetle

Smicronyx quadrifer, the white dodder weevil, is a species of true weevil in the beetle family Curculionidae. It is found in North America.
