= Smicronyx spretus =

Scientific classification
- Kingdom: Animalia
- Phylum: Arthropoda
- Clade: Pancrustacea
- Class: Insecta
- Order: Coleoptera
- Suborder: Polyphaga
- Infraorder: Cucujiformia
- Superfamily: Curculionoidea
- Family: Curculionidae
- Genus: Smicronyx
- Species: S. spretus

Binomial name
- Smicronyx spretus Dietz, 1894

Species of beetle

Smicronyx spretus is a species of snout or bark beetle in the family Curculionidae. It is found in North America.
