= Smicronyx triangularis =

Scientific classification
- Domain: Eukaryota
- Kingdom: Animalia
- Phylum: Arthropoda
- Class: Insecta
- Order: Coleoptera
- Suborder: Polyphaga
- Infraorder: Cucujiformia
- Family: Curculionidae
- Genus: Smicronyx
- Species: S. triangularis

Binomial name
- Smicronyx triangularis (Dietz, 1894)

Species of beetle

Smicronyx triangularis is a species of true weevil in the beetle family Curculionidae. It is found in North America.
