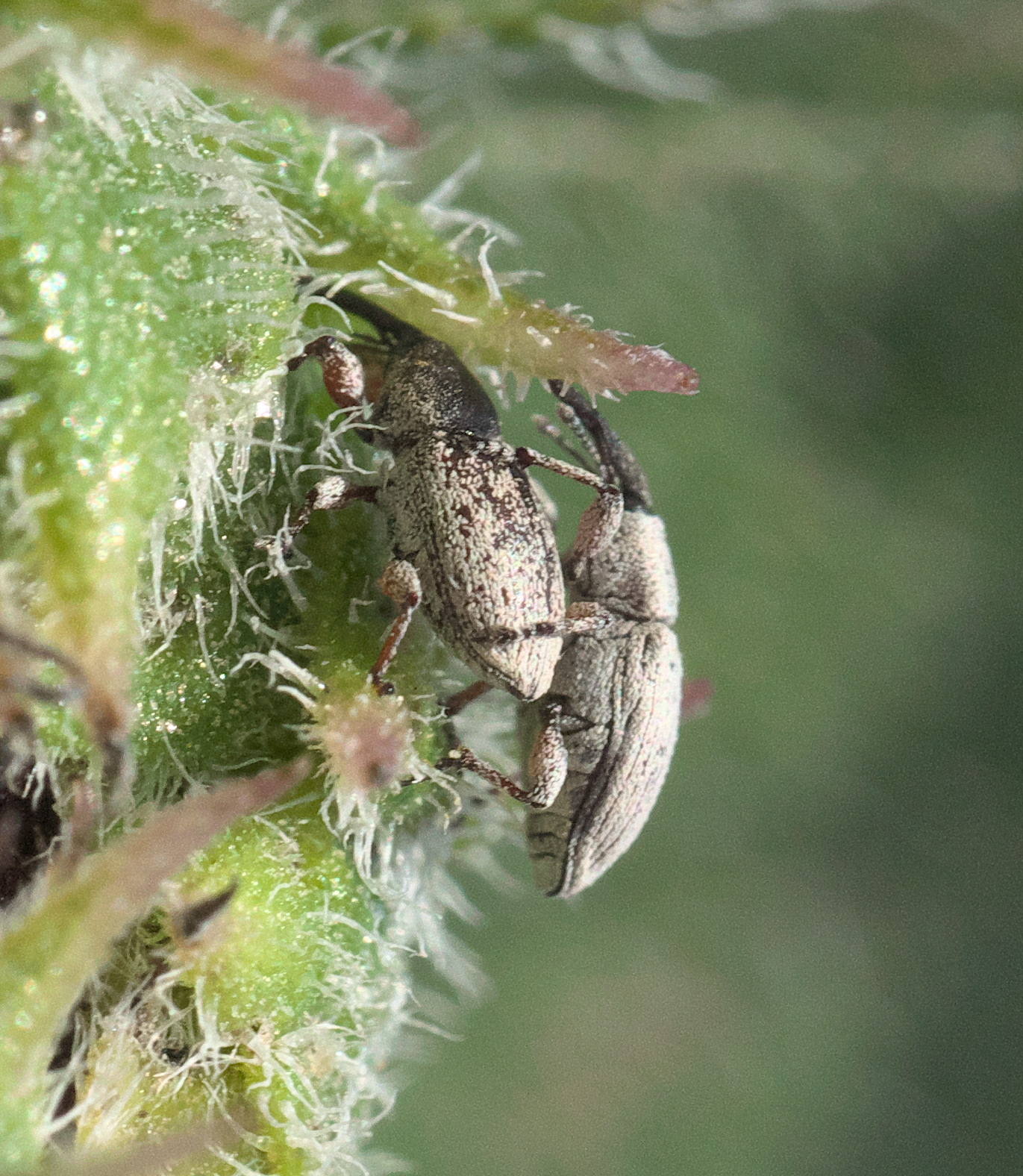
- Smicronyx sordidus, grey sunflower seed weevil, Nebraska

Scientific classification
- Domain: Eukaryota
- Kingdom: Animalia
- Phylum: Arthropoda
- Class: Insecta
- Order: Coleoptera
- Suborder: Polyphaga
- Infraorder: Cucujiformia
- Family: Curculionidae
- Subfamily: Curculioninae
- Genus: Smicronyx
- Species: S. sordidus

Binomial name
- Smicronyx sordidus LeConte, 1876

= Smicronyx sordidus =

Species of beetle

The gray sunflower seed weevil Smicronyx sordidus is a species of weevils from a family of Curculionidae.

== Description ==
Adult beetles are 8 millimetres (0.31 in) long, and pale gray.

== Ecology and habitat ==
The species life cycle is only a year long. Both sexes eat sunflower buds, and often before they open. Sometimes they eat plant tissues. Females like the flowers whose buds are about to hatch, therefore, they can lay their eggs at the bottom of the seed. When they hatch, a larva emerges from them, destroying the seed from inside. On the later stages the larvae exit the seeds by dropping to the ground, where they hide during winter time. They reproduce every June.
