= Smicronyx humilis =

Scientific classification
- Domain: Eukaryota
- Kingdom: Animalia
- Phylum: Arthropoda
- Class: Insecta
- Order: Coleoptera
- Suborder: Polyphaga
- Infraorder: Cucujiformia
- Family: Curculionidae
- Genus: Smicronyx
- Species: S. humilis

Binomial name
- Smicronyx humilis (Dietz, 1894)

Species of beetle

Smicronyx humilis is a species of true weevil in the beetle family Curculionidae. It is found in North America. an adult ranges between 2.6 and 3.0 millimeters.
