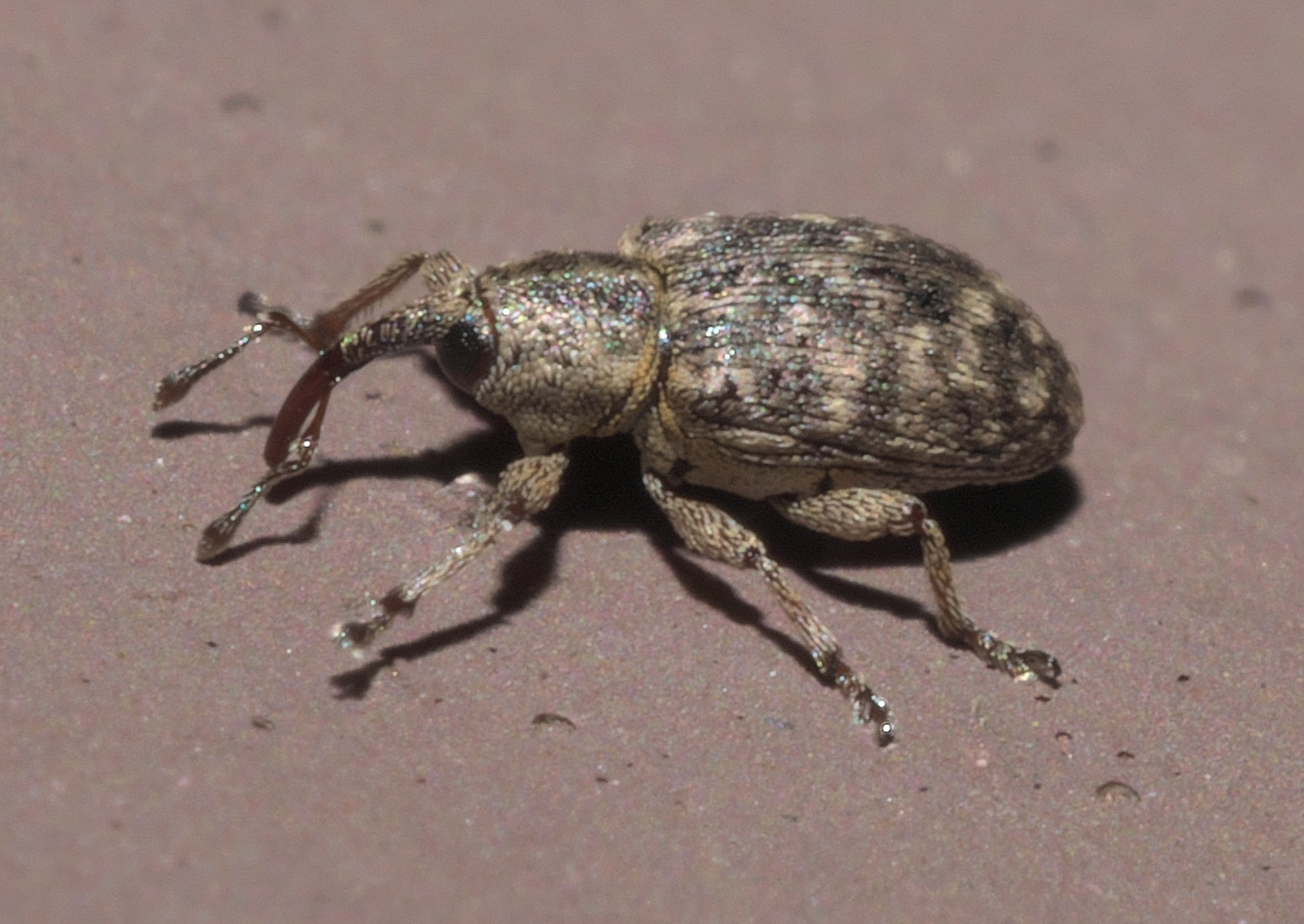

Scientific classification
- Kingdom: Animalia
- Phylum: Arthropoda
- Clade: Pancrustacea
- Class: Insecta
- Order: Coleoptera
- Suborder: Polyphaga
- Infraorder: Cucujiformia
- Superfamily: Curculionoidea
- Family: Curculionidae
- Genus: Smicronyx
- Species: S. corniculatus

Binomial name
- Smicronyx corniculatus (Fahraeus, 1843)

Synonyms
- Smicronyx columbianus Dietz, 1894; Smicronyx connivens Casey, 1892; Smicronyx fallaciosus Klima, 1934; Smicronyx launginosus Dietz, 1894; Smicronyx spurcus Casey, 1892; Smicronyx squamulatus LeConte, 1876

= Smicronyx corniculatus =

Species of beetle

Smicronyx corniculatus is a species of true weevil in the beetle family Curculionidae. It is found in North America.
