= Cylindrocopturus adspersus =

Scientific classification
- Kingdom: Animalia
- Phylum: Arthropoda
- Class: Insecta
- Order: Coleoptera
- Suborder: Polyphaga
- Infraorder: Cucujiformia
- Family: Curculionidae
- Genus: Cylindrocopturus
- Species: C. adspersus

Binomial name
- Cylindrocopturus adspersus (LeConte, 1876)

Synonyms
- Copturodes cockerelli Casey, 1897; Copturodes koebelei Casey, 1897; Copturodes suturalis Casey, 1897

Species of beetle

Cylindrocopturus adspersus, the sunflower stem weevil, is a species of true weevil in the beetle family Curculionidae. It is found in North America, where the larvae tunnel in the stems of wild and cultivated sunflower plants.

== Description ==
The adult sunflower stem weevil is about 5 mm (0.2 in) long and a grayish-brown color with irregular whitish markings. The larva is creamy white with a brown head.

== Ecology ==
The adults emerge from their over-wintering chamber in old sunflower stumps in May or June and feeds on sunflower leaves, doing no significant damage. When ready to breed, the female chews a hole in the base of a sunflower stem and inserts a single egg, protecting it with frass. The larva feeds inside the stem and when fully developed descends to the base of the plant and hollows out a chamber in the woody tissue. It is this excavation that weakens the stem.

The main parasitoid of the larva of the sunflower stem weevil is Nealiolus curculionis, a braconid wasp. The female of this wasp lays an egg inside the first instar larva of the sunflower stem weevil, and when that larva enters diapause in the fall, in a chamber near the base of the plant, the wasp larva also goes into hibernation. Both larvae resume activity in the spring, and about twenty days later, the wasp larva exits the weevil larva, feeds on its carcass, and pupates. The adult wasp emerges about ten days later, both insects having a single generation each year.

== Damage ==
The sunflower is an important oil-producing crop in North America, and is also native to the continent. By excavating through the woody tissues, the larvae of the sunflower stem weevil makes the crop more susceptible to lodging in strong winds before the crop is harvested. Where this weevil is present in association with the pathogenic fungus Macrophomina phaseolina, the stems may develop black streaking and the crop may be affected by a Fusarium solani collar rot.
