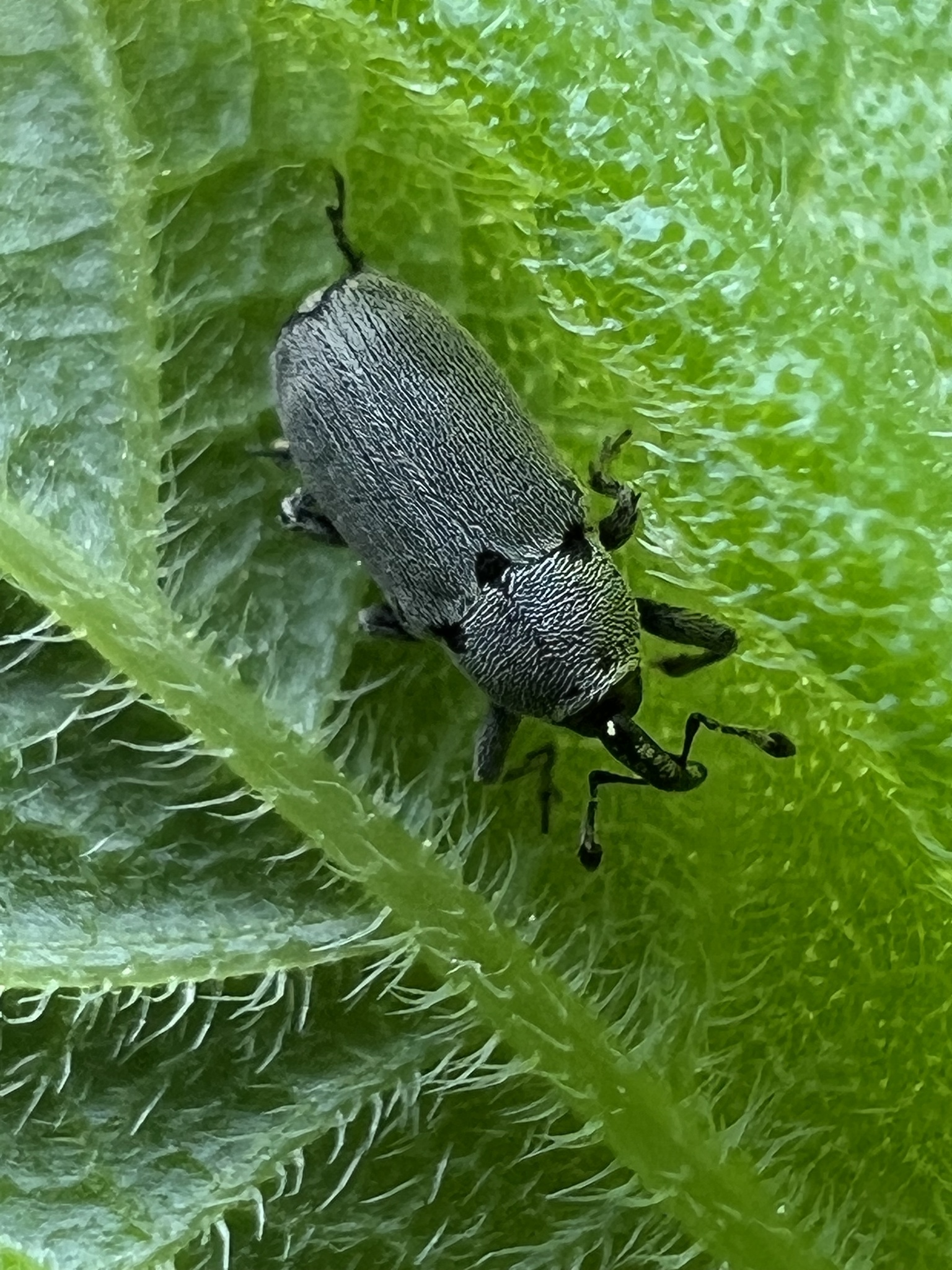

Scientific classification
- Kingdom: Animalia
- Phylum: Arthropoda
- Class: Insecta
- Order: Coleoptera
- Suborder: Polyphaga
- Infraorder: Cucujiformia
- Family: Curculionidae
- Genus: Trichobaris
- Species: T. trinotata

Binomial name
- Trichobaris trinotata (Say, 1832)

Synonyms
- Baridius plumbeus LeConte, 1869; Trichobaris impotens Casey, 1920; Trichobaris jejuniosa Casey, 1920

= Trichobaris trinotata =

Species of beetle

Trichobaris trinotata, commonly known as the potato stalk borer, is a species of weevil in the family Curculionidae. It is found in North America where it is a pest of potato plants, the larvae tunnelling inside their stems.

== Description ==
The adult weevil is a small species with a length of about 4.4 mm (0.17 in) and a width of about 1.7 mm (0.07 in). The rostrum or beak bends sharply downwards at the base. The insect is inconspicuous; it is black in color but appears gray as most of the surface is covered by minute gray scales; scales are absent from the head and from three spots at the base of the elytra, one at the front and one on either side, and these appear dark. These three bare spots give the insect its scientific name of "trinotata".

== Ecology ==
This weevil feeds on plants in the family Solanaceae. The potato is its most economically-important food plant, but it sometimes feeds on the eggplant (Solanum melongena), the Carolina horsenettle (Solanum carolinense), the buffalo bur (Solanum rostratum), the European black nightshade (Solanum nigrum) and several species of groundcherry (Physalis).

Adults emerge from reproductive diapause in spring and the females start to lay their eggs in May. These are deposited singly in holes made in stems and leaf stalks by the insect's rostrum, or in the axils of terminal leaves. The eggs hatch in about a week and the white, legless larvae eat their way through the stem tissues, creating tunnels up to 30 cm (12 in) in length. Having passed through five or six instars over a period of up to 106 days, the larvae pupate in the stem, with the adults emerging about twelve days later. There is a single generation each year and the adults overwinter inside the dead potato haulms or the stems of other members of the Solanaceae such as Solanum carolinense.

Few enemies of this weevil have been identified, but it is sometimes parasitised by the braconid wasp, Nealiolus curculionis and less frequently by the eurytomid wasp, Eurytoma tylodermatis.

== Damage ==
The adults feed on leaves producing ragged holes, but it is the larvae that cause most damage to the potato crop with their tunnelling activities. At one time this weevil was considered a serious pest of potatoes, however modern management practices have reduced its impact. The burning or removal of crop residues destroys the overwintering adults.
