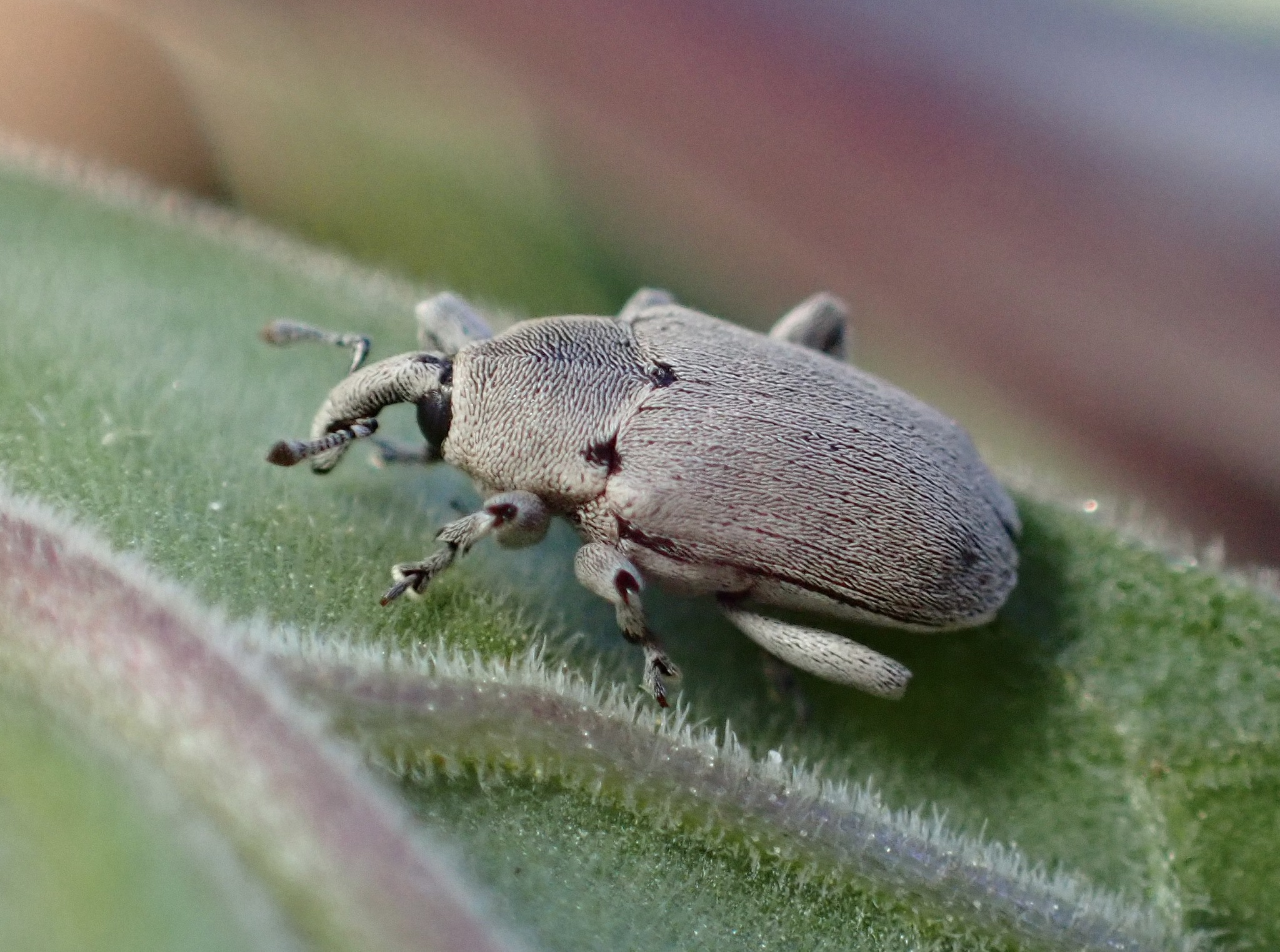

Scientific classification
- Kingdom: Animalia
- Phylum: Arthropoda
- Class: Insecta
- Order: Coleoptera
- Suborder: Polyphaga
- Infraorder: Cucujiformia
- Family: Curculionidae
- Genus: Trichobaris
- Species: T. compacta

Binomial name
- Trichobaris compacta Casey, 1892

Synonyms
- Trichobaris brevipennis Casey, 1920; Trichobaris densata Casey, 1920; Trichobaris retrusa Casey, 1920; Trichobaris utensis Casey, 1920

= Trichobaris compacta =

Datura weevil

Species of beetle

Trichobaris compacta, also known as the datura weevil, is a species of flower weevil in the beetle family Curculionidae. It is found in North America. Preferred host plants include Datura wrightii, commonly known as sacred datura.
