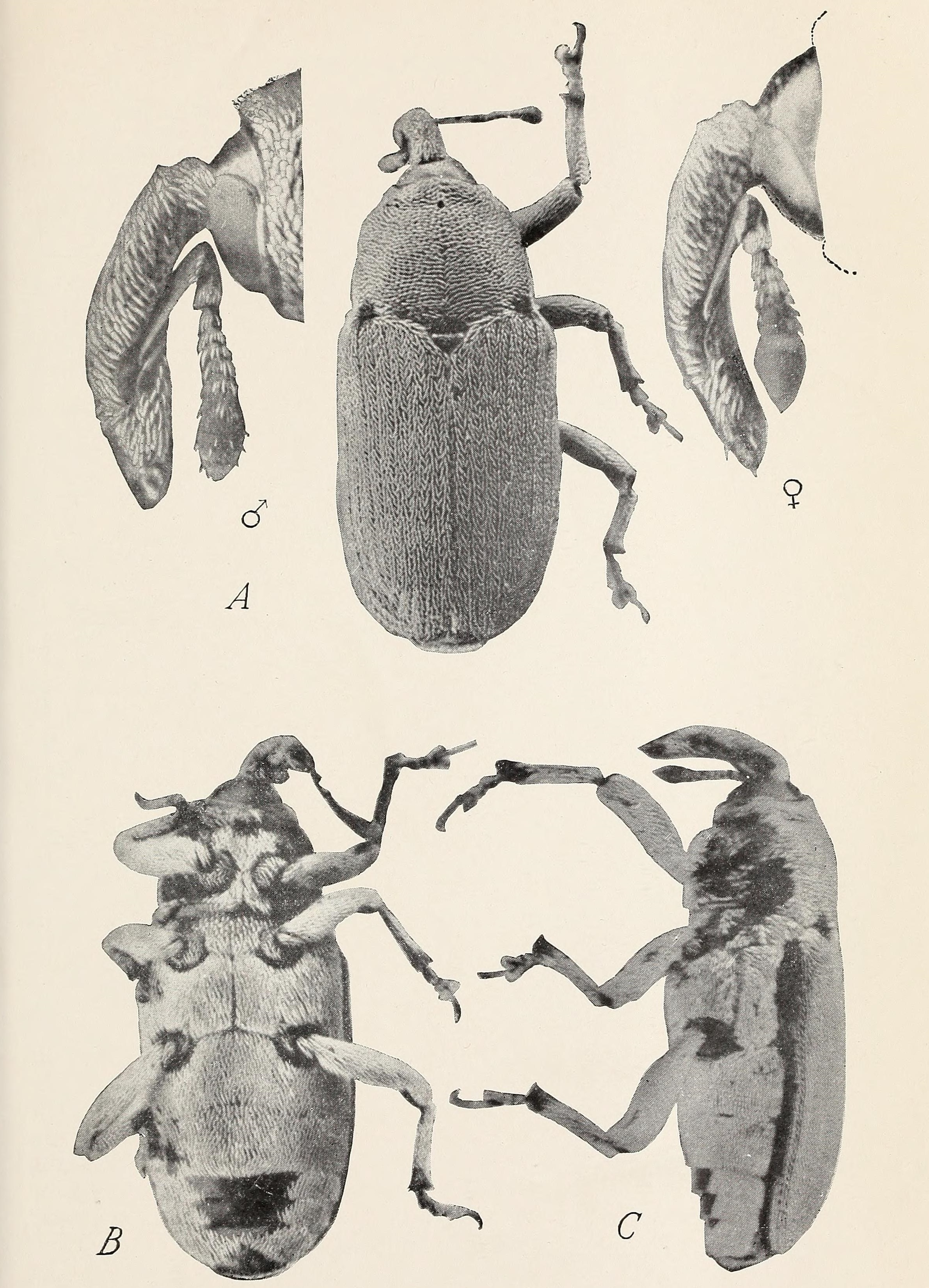

Scientific classification
- Domain: Eukaryota
- Kingdom: Animalia
- Phylum: Arthropoda
- Class: Insecta
- Order: Coleoptera
- Suborder: Polyphaga
- Infraorder: Cucujiformia
- Family: Curculionidae
- Genus: Trichobaris
- Species: T. mucorea

Binomial name
- Trichobaris mucorea (LeConte, 1858)

Synonyms
- Trichobaris apicata Casey, 1920; Trichobaris arida Casey, 1920; Trichobaris latipennis Casey, 1920; Trichobaris nanella Casey, 1920; Trichobaris rugulicollis Casey, 1920; Trichobaris striatula Casey, 1920

= Trichobaris mucorea =

Species of beetle

Trichobaris mucorea, the tobacco stalk borer, is a species of flower weevil in the family Curculionidae. It is found in North America.

This species is associated with the wild tobacco plant Nicotiana attenuata, spending most of its life cycle from egg to adult stage hidden inside the stem, where it feeds on the pith.
