= Smicronyx flavicans =

Scientific classification
- Kingdom: Animalia
- Phylum: Arthropoda
- Class: Insecta
- Order: Coleoptera
- Suborder: Polyphaga
- Infraorder: Cucujiformia
- Family: Curculionidae
- Genus: Smicronyx
- Species: S. flavicans

Binomial name
- Smicronyx flavicans LeConte, 1876

Synonyms
- Smicronyx dietzi Klima, 1934; Smicronyx maculatus Dietz, 1894; Smicronyx ornatipennis Dietz, 1894

Species of beetle

Smicronyx flavicans is a species in the family Curculionidae ("snout and bark beetles"), in the order Coleoptera ("beetles"). It is found in North America.
