= Trichobaris bridwelli =

Scientific classification
- Domain: Eukaryota
- Kingdom: Animalia
- Phylum: Arthropoda
- Class: Insecta
- Order: Coleoptera
- Suborder: Polyphaga
- Infraorder: Cucujiformia
- Family: Curculionidae
- Genus: Trichobaris
- Species: T. bridwelli

Binomial name
- Trichobaris bridwelli Barber, 1935

Species of beetle

Trichobaris bridwelli is a species of flower weevil in the beetle family Curculionidae. It is found in the US, Dominican Republic and Puerto Rico.
