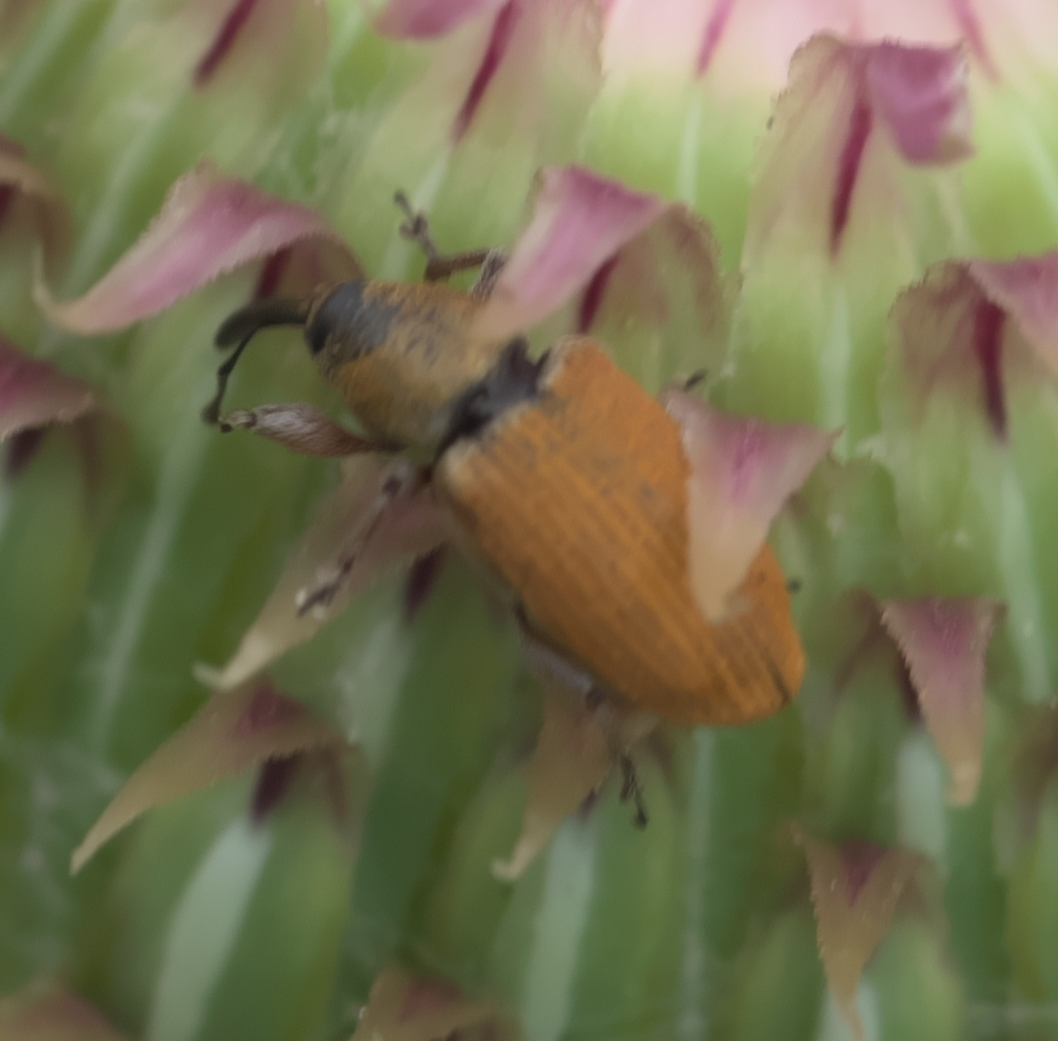

Scientific classification
- Domain: Eukaryota
- Kingdom: Animalia
- Phylum: Arthropoda
- Class: Insecta
- Order: Coleoptera
- Suborder: Polyphaga
- Infraorder: Cucujiformia
- Family: Curculionidae
- Genus: Smicronyx
- Species: S. fulvus

Binomial name
- Smicronyx fulvus LeConte, 1876

= Smicronyx fulvus =

Species of beetle

Smicronyx fulvus, commonly known as the red sunflower seed weevil, is a weevil in the family Curculionidae.

== Description ==
Adult beetles are 2.5–3 mm in length. They are long and reddish-brown in color.

== Distribution ==
The species is found in the United States and Canada.

== Ecology ==
The larvae feed on Helianthus species and are sometimes parasitised by the braconid wasp Nealiolus curculionis.
