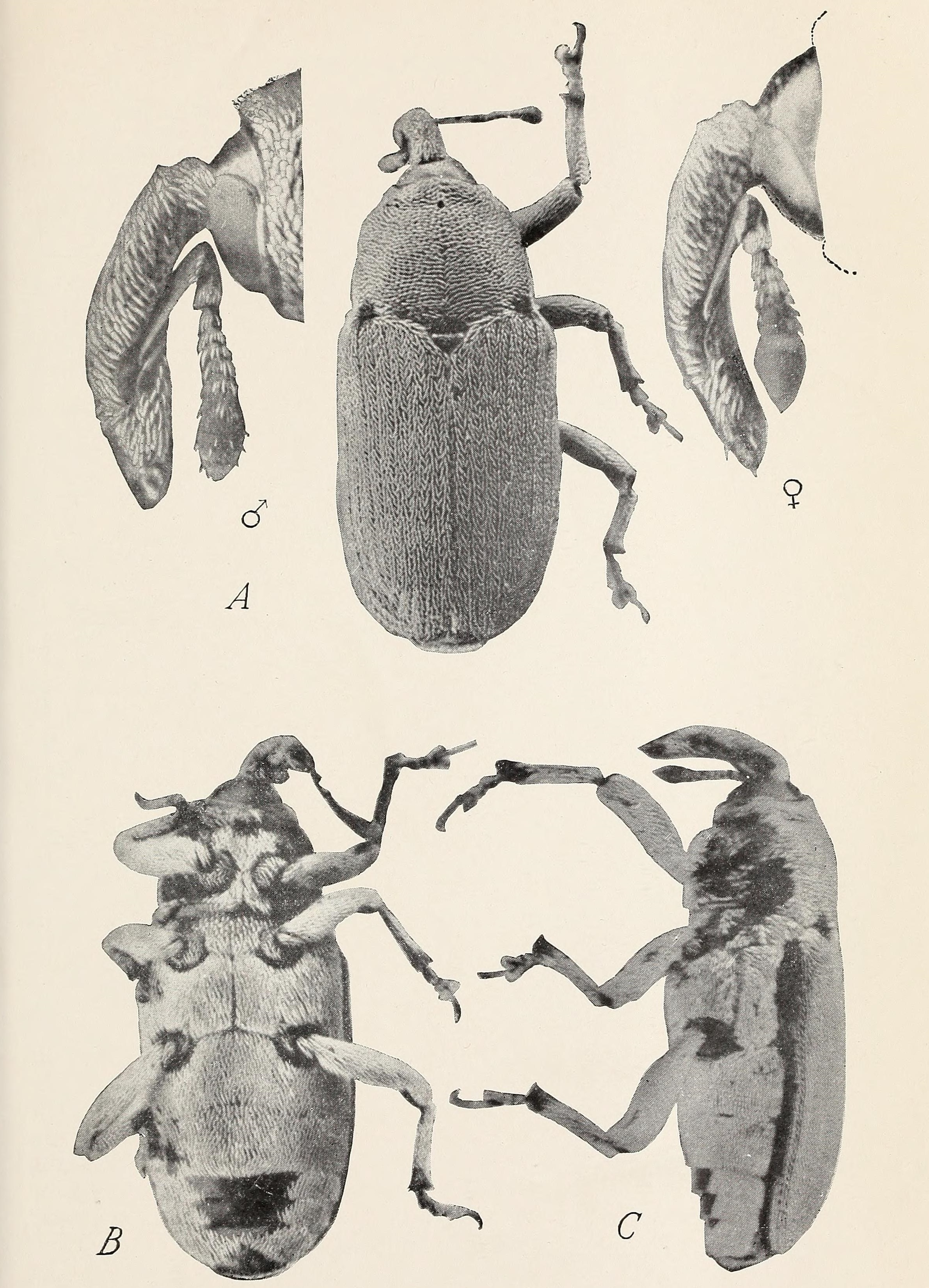
- Trichobaris mucorea

Scientific classification
- Kingdom: Animalia
- Phylum: Arthropoda
- Clade: Pancrustacea
- Class: Insecta
- Order: Coleoptera
- Suborder: Polyphaga
- Infraorder: Cucujiformia
- Superfamily: Curculionoidea
- Family: Curculionidae
- Subfamily: Baridinae
- Tribe: Baridini
- Genus: Trichobaris; LeConte, 1876

= Trichobaris =

Genus of beetles

Trichobaris is a genus of flower weevils in the family Curculionidae. There are 8 to 13 species in genus Trichobaris.

These weevils feed on plants in the family Solanaceae, including cultivated plants such as tomato, potato, and tobacco. They likely evolved in association with plants of genus Datura.

== Species ==
Species include:

- Trichobaris bridwelli Barber, 1935
- Trichobaris championi Barber, 1935
- Trichobaris compacta Casey, 1892 (Datura weevil)
- Trichobaris cylindrica Casey, 1892
- Trichobaris insolita Casey, 1892
- Trichobaris major Barber, 1935
- Trichobaris mucorea (LeConte, 1858) (tobacco stalk borer)
- Trichobaris pellicea (Boheman, 1844)
- Trichobaris pueblana Casey, 1920
- Trichobaris trinotata (Say, 1832) (potato stalk borer)
- Trichobaris vestita (Boheman, 1836)
