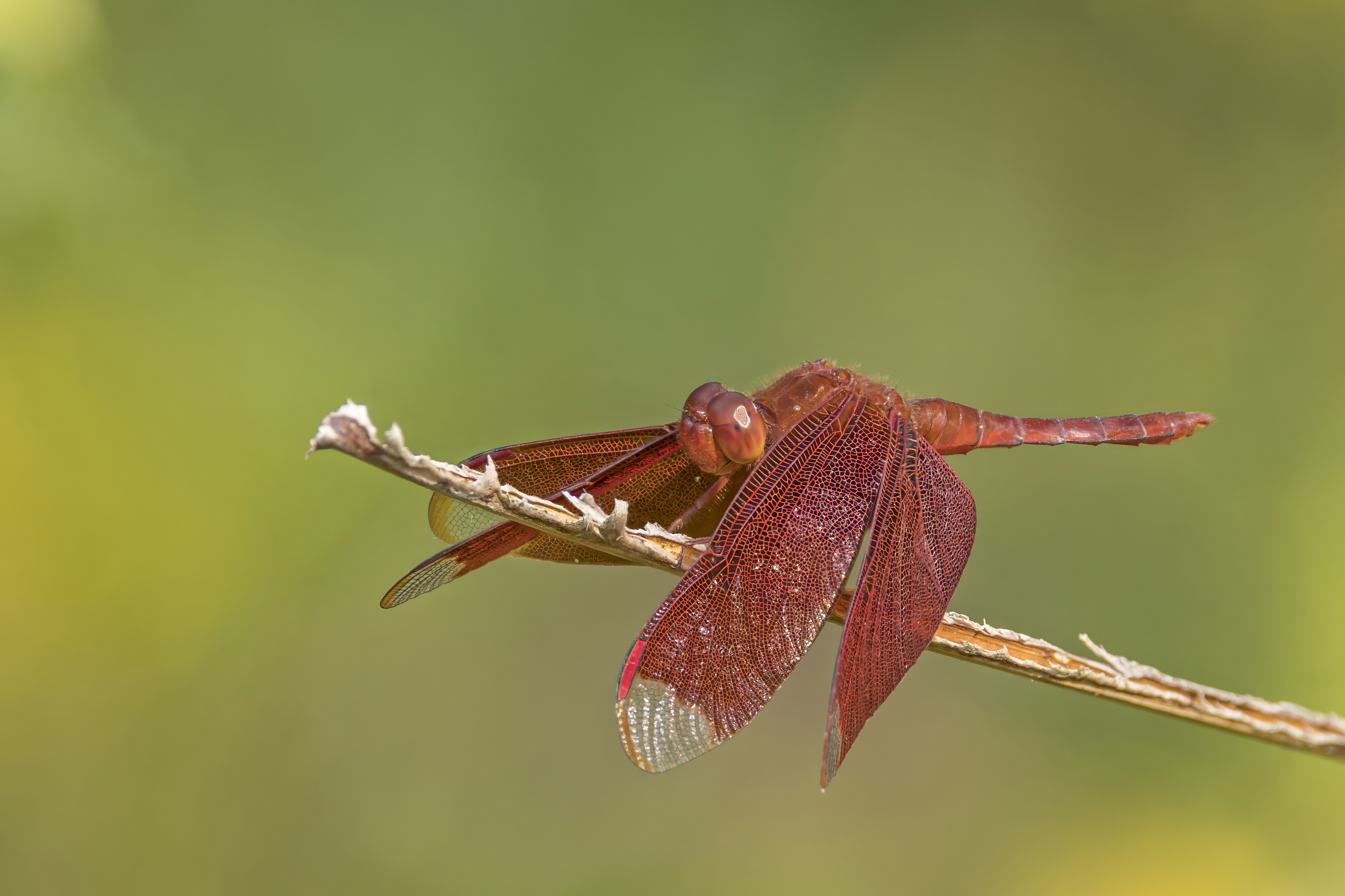
- Male
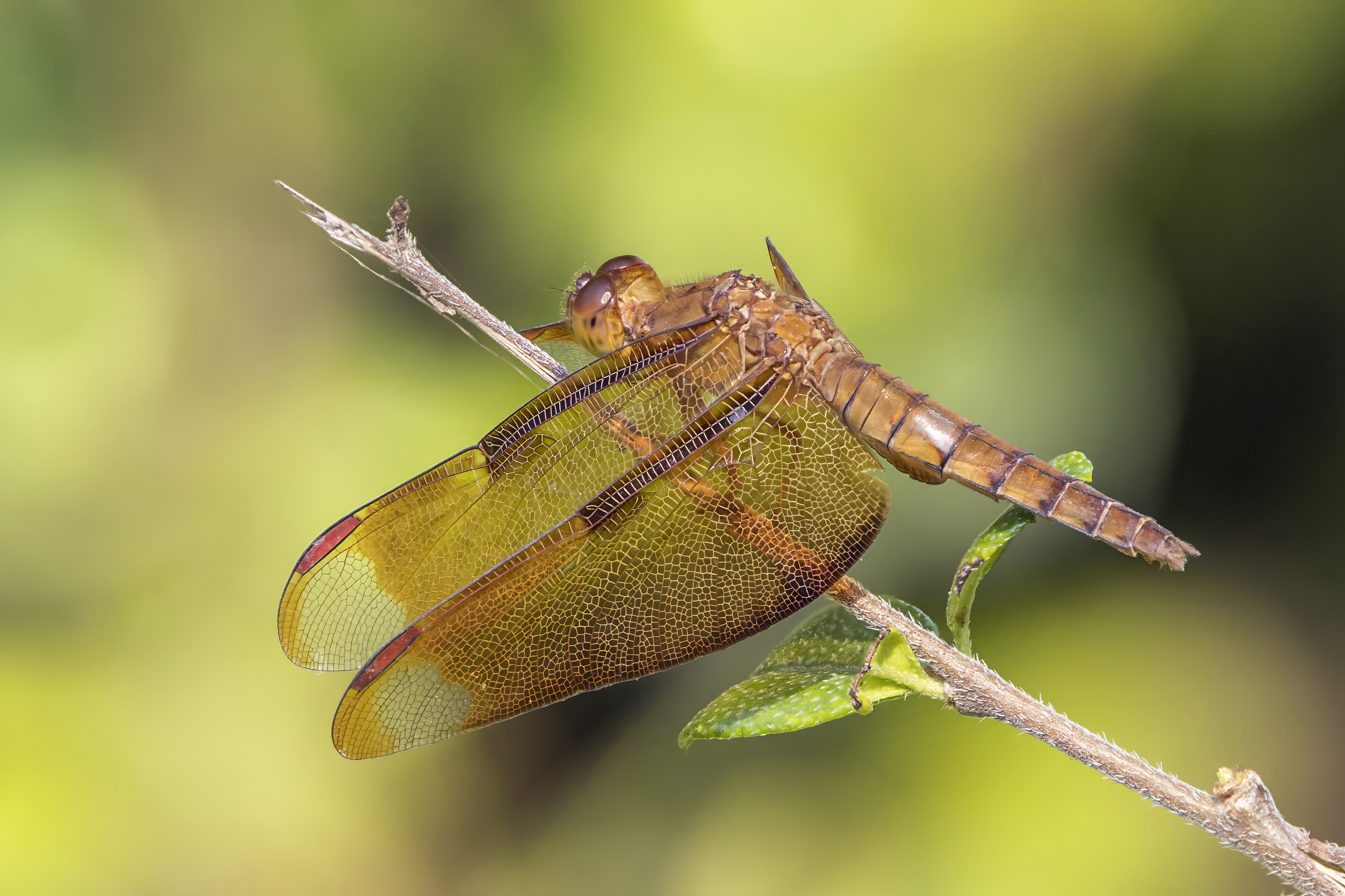
- Female

Conservation status
- Least Concern (IUCN 3.1)

Scientific classification
- Kingdom: Animalia
- Phylum: Arthropoda
- Clade: Pancrustacea
- Class: Insecta
- Order: Odonata
- Infraorder: Anisoptera
- Family: Libellulidae
- Genus: Neurothemis
- Species: N. fulvia

Binomial name
- Neurothemis fulvia (Drury, 1773)

Synonyms
- Libellula apicalis Guerin-Meneville, 1838; Polyneura sophronia Rambur, 1842

= Neurothemis fulvia =

Fulvous forest skimmer

Species of dragonfly

Neurothemis fulvia, the fulvous forest skimmer, is a species of dragonfly found in Asia.

== Description ==
It is a medium-sized rusty dragonfly with transparent wing tips. Male has a reddish-brown face with eyes which are dark reddish brown above, golden brown below. Thorax, abdomen and legs are reddish brown. Wings are dark reddish brown with an irregular triangular transparent area at the tip of the wing. The wing spots are dark reddish brown. Many forms of females are found. Color of head, thorax and abdomen paler than males or rusty brown. Wings are clear amber yellow with a dark ray extending to the tip in fore wing. Many of them have an irregular triangular transparent area at the tip of the wing. The wings vary in size, shape, width and coloration. The clear uncoloured apices of wings will help to distinguish it from other red Asian dragonflies.

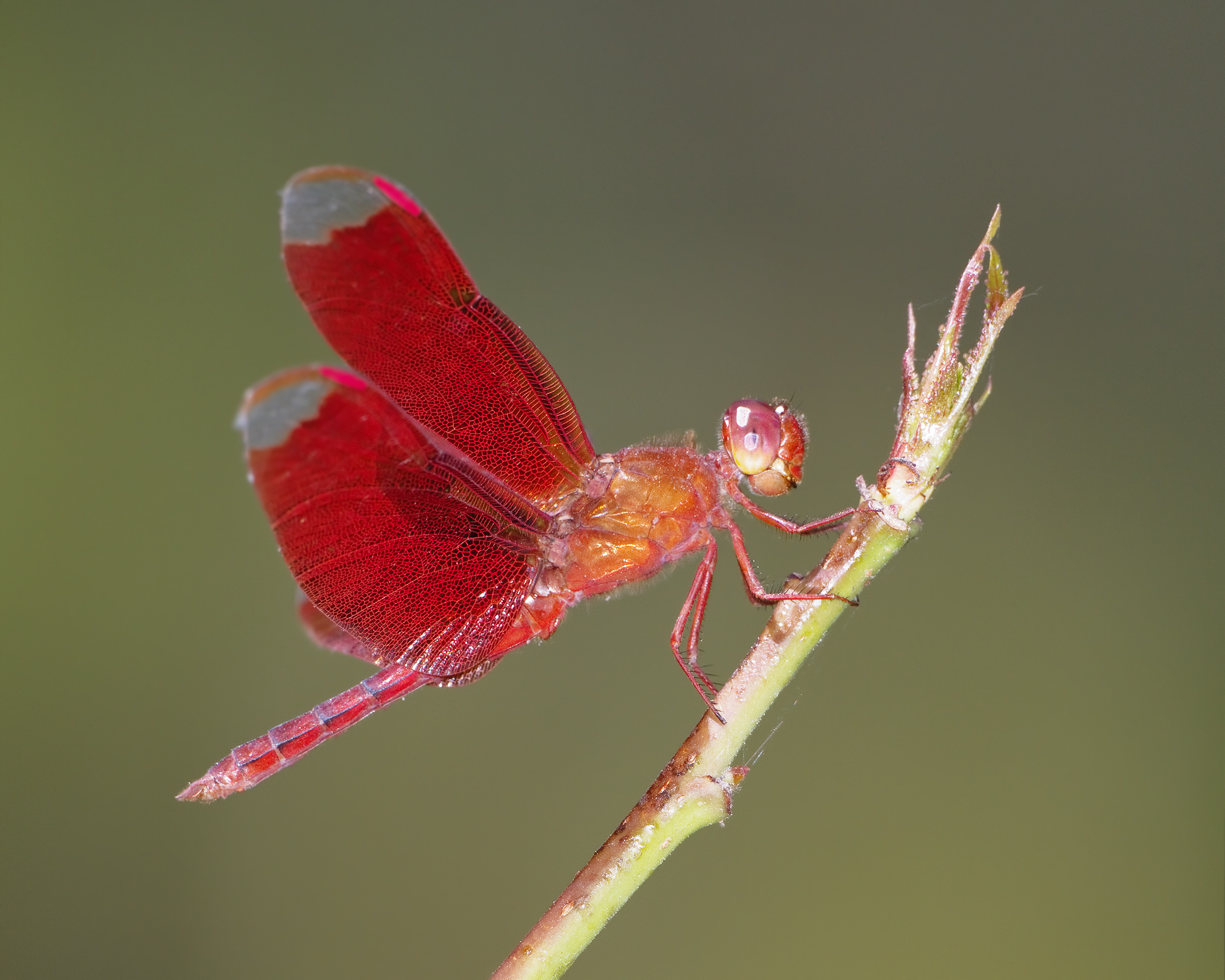
male

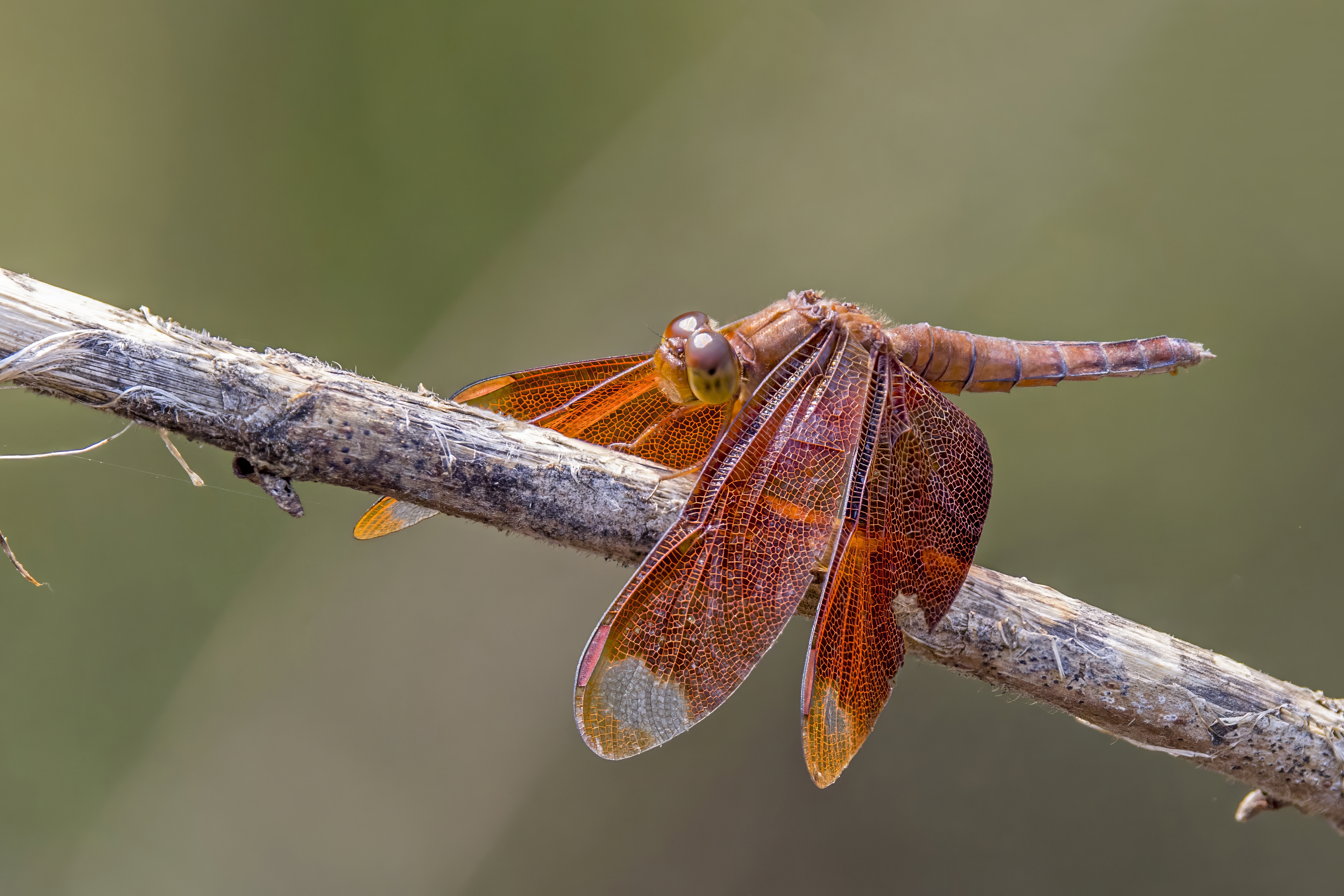
male

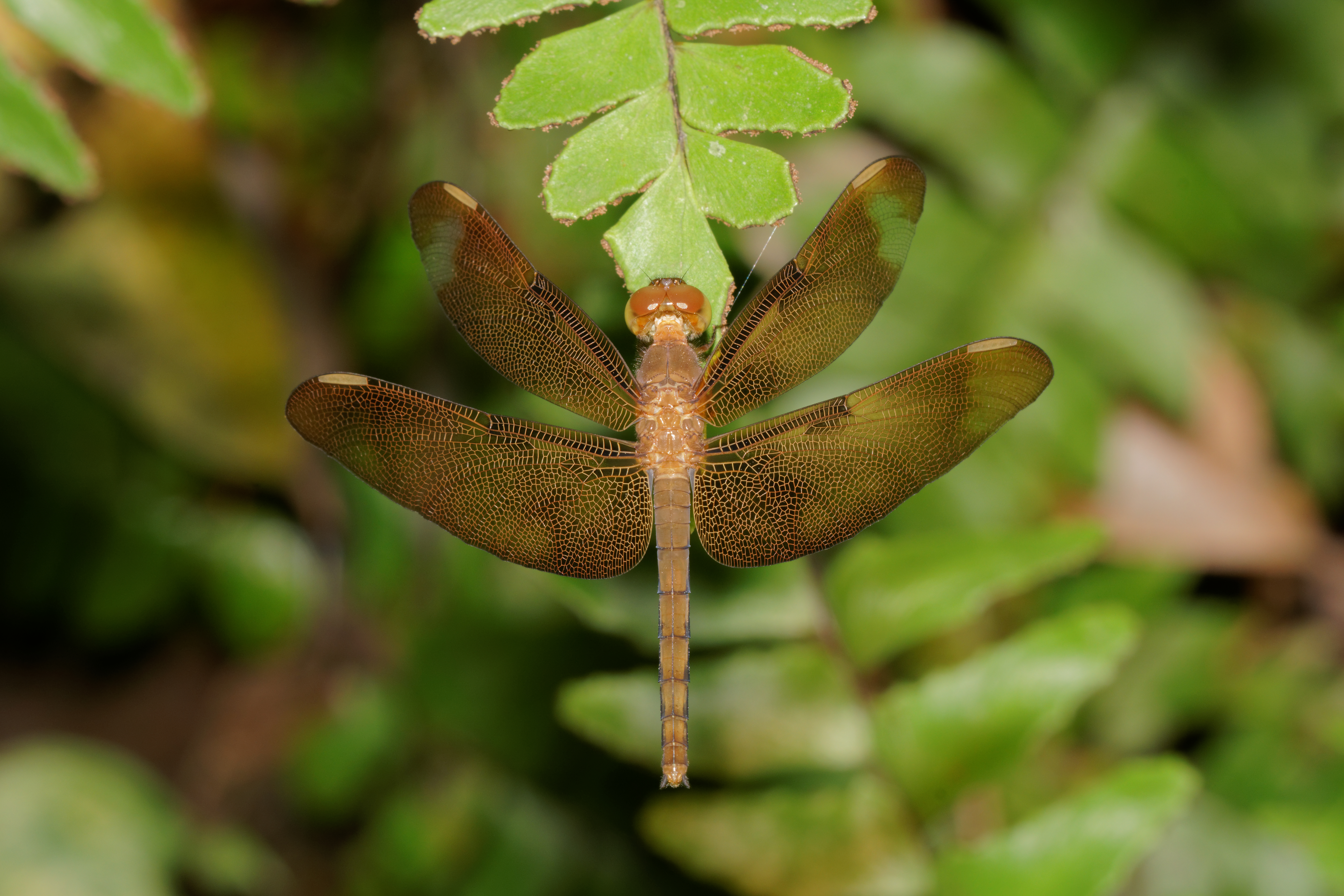
Female

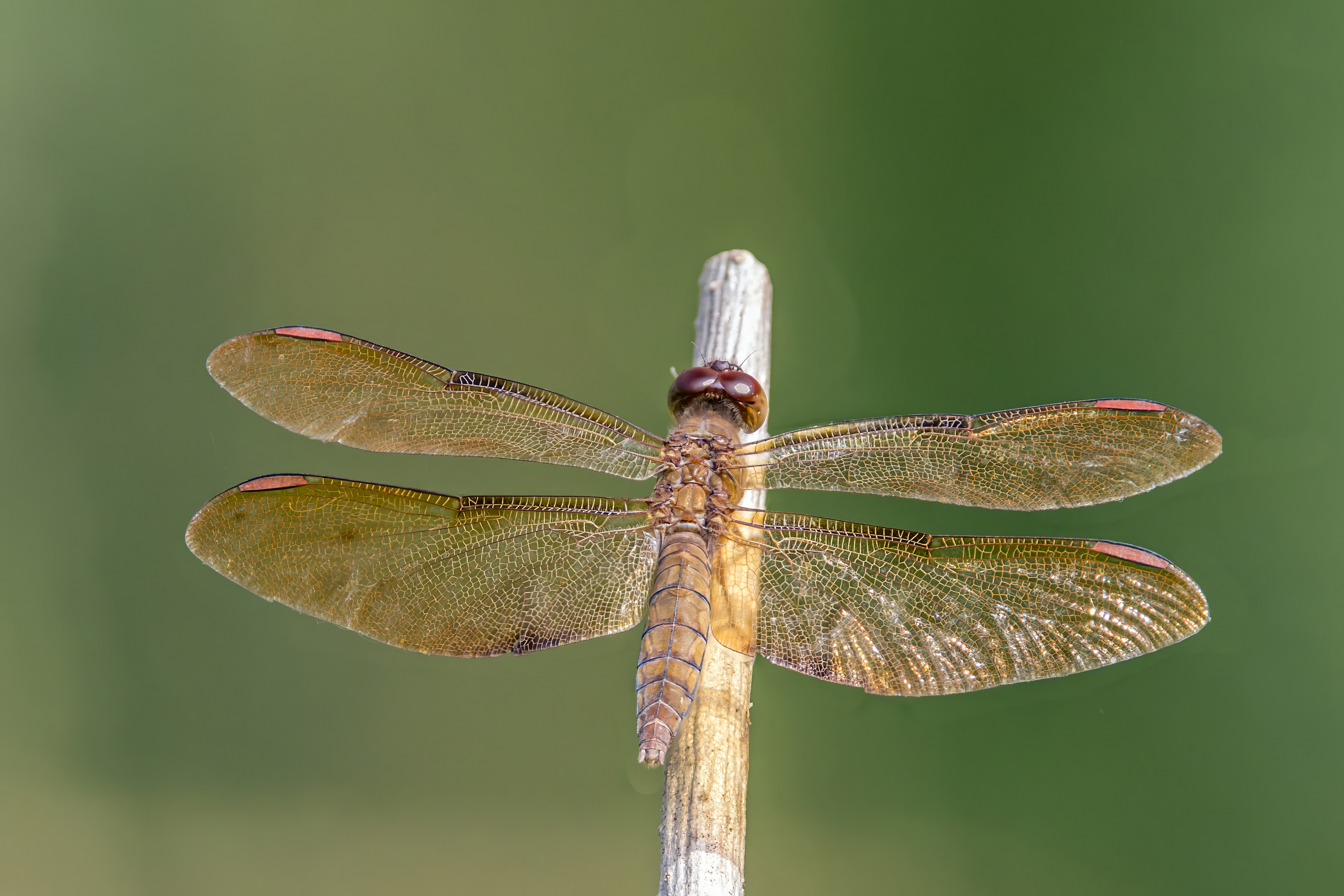
Isochrome female

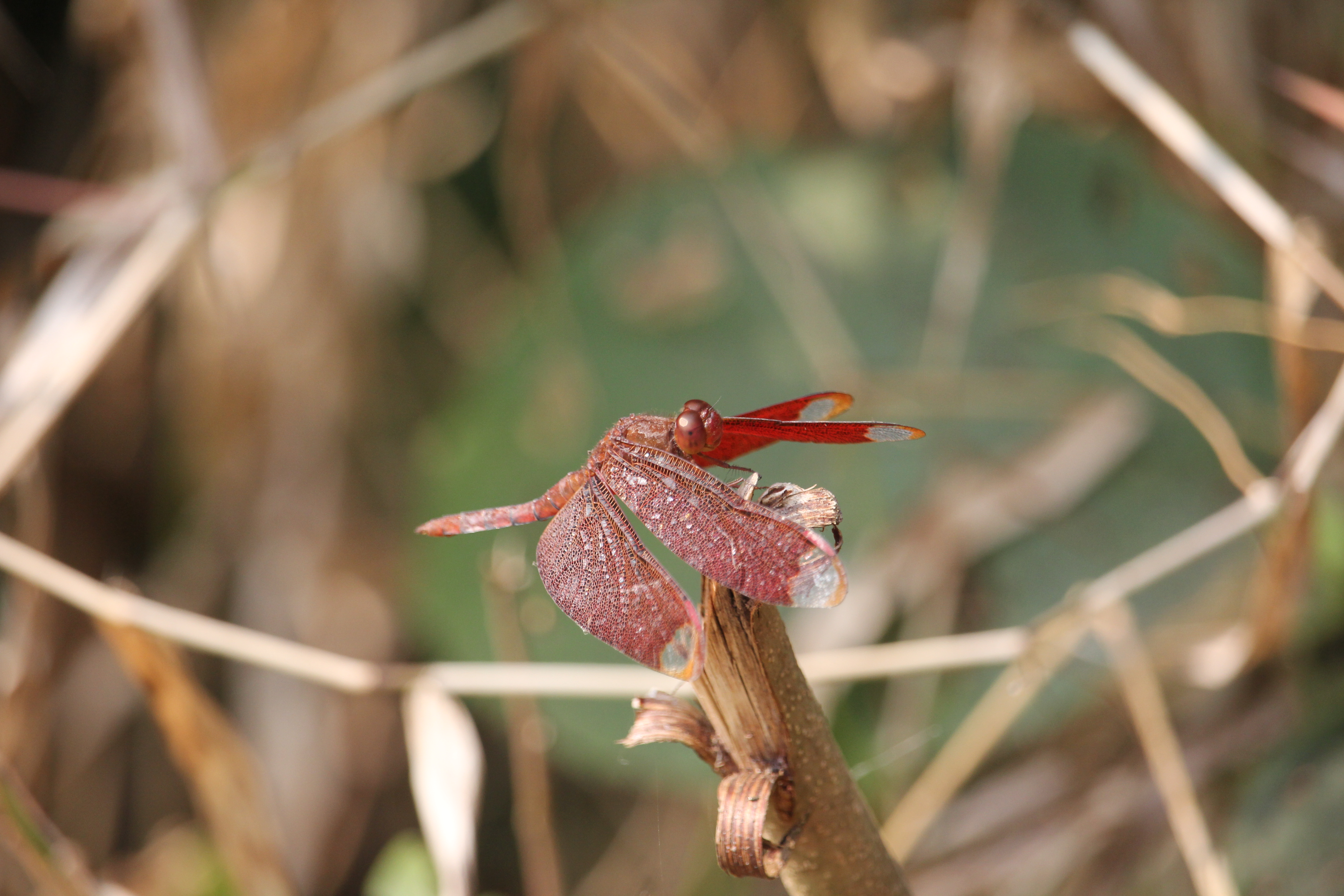
Neurothemis fulvia (male) perched at Mir Mosharraf Hossain Hall, Jahangirnagar University, Savar, Bangladesh.

== Distribution and Habitat ==
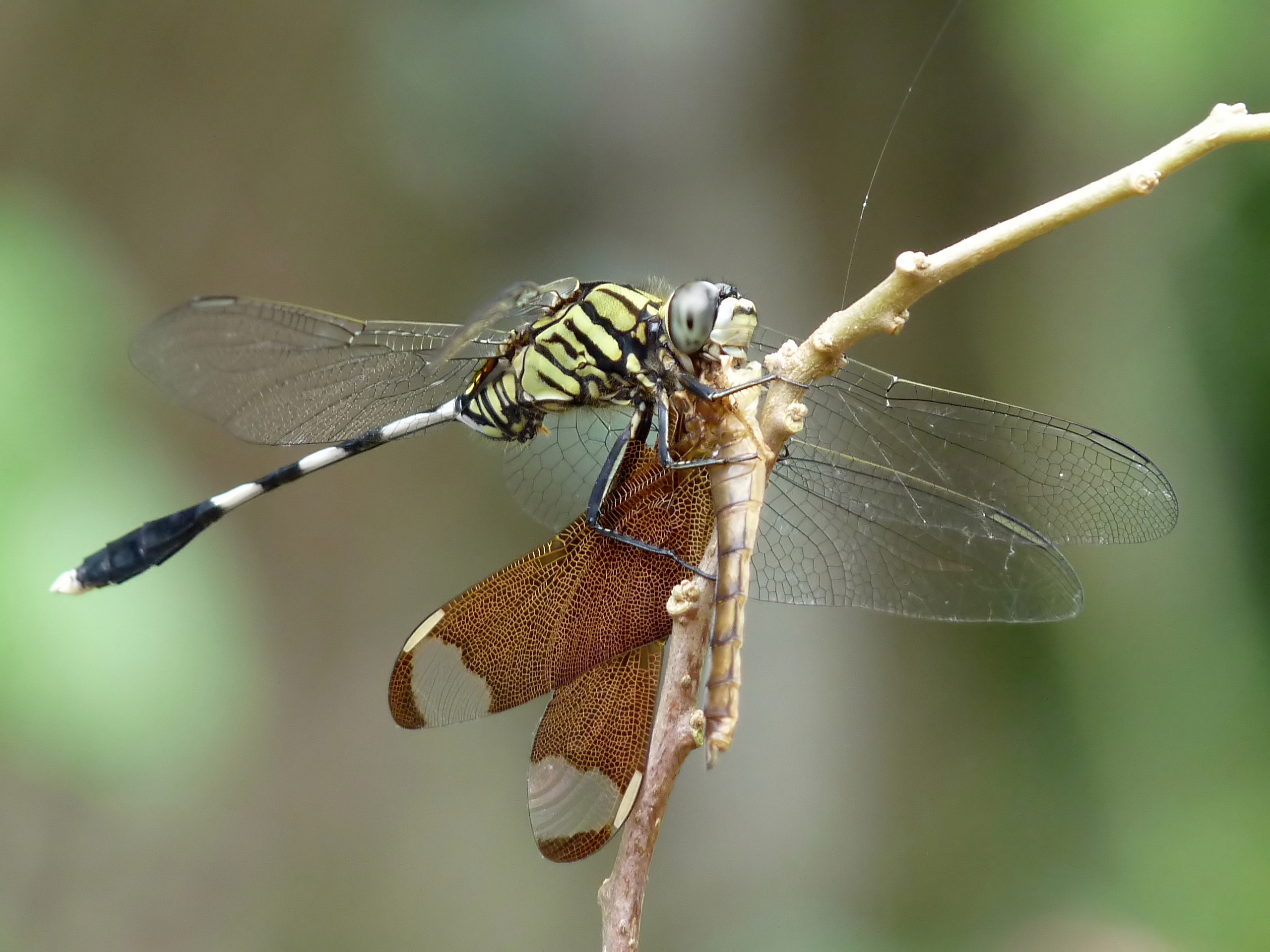
Orthetrum sabina feeding on Neurothemis fulvia

It is a dragonfly of wet forests, usually perches on fallen logs and shrubs. A large number of them can be found together in canopy gaps and forest edges. It breeds in marshes associated with forest streams, marshes and ponds. They are also found in local parks, gardens, etc.

== See also ==
- List of odonates of Sri Lanka
- List of odonates of India
- List of odonata of Kerala
