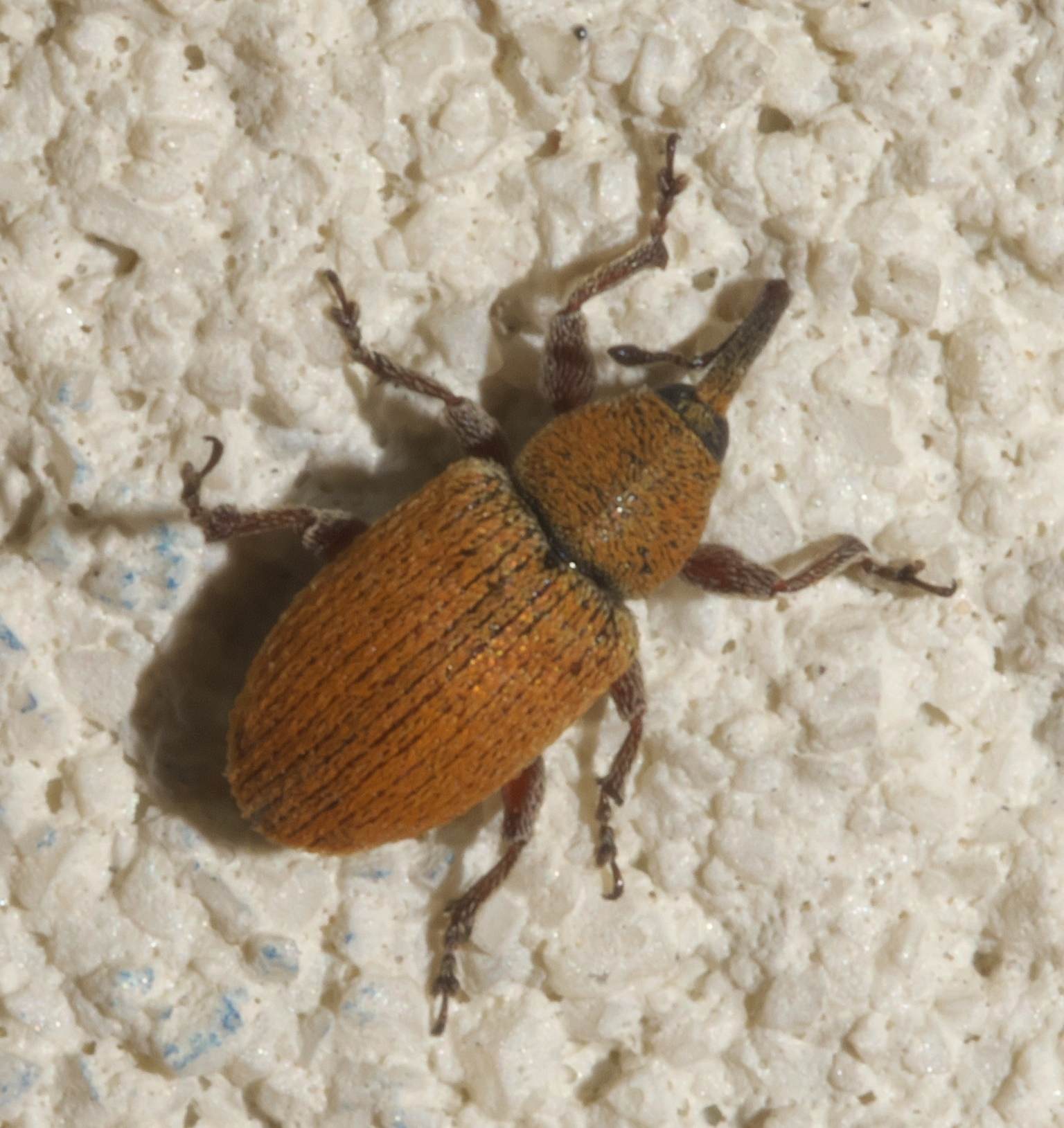
- Smicronyx fulvus, Colorado

Scientific classification
- Kingdom: Animalia
- Phylum: Arthropoda
- Class: Insecta
- Order: Coleoptera
- Suborder: Polyphaga
- Infraorder: Cucujiformia
- Family: Curculionidae
- Subfamily: Curculioninae
- Genus: Smicronyx; Schönherr, 1843

Subgenera
- Desmoris; Pachyphanes; Pseudosmicronyx; Smicronyx

Diversity
- at least 220 species

Synonyms
- Barytychius LeConte & Horn, 1883; Dermoris Dietz, 1894; Micronyx Dejean, 1835; Mycronyx Sturm, 1843; Pachytychius LeConte, 1876; Pseudosmicronyx Klima, 1934; Pseudromicronyx Dietz, 1894; Smicromyx Handlirsch, 1907; Smycronyx Escalera, 1914

= Smicronyx =

Genus of beetles

Smicronyx is a genus of true weevils in the beetle family Curculionidae. There are more than 220 described species in the genus Smicronyx, found worldwide.

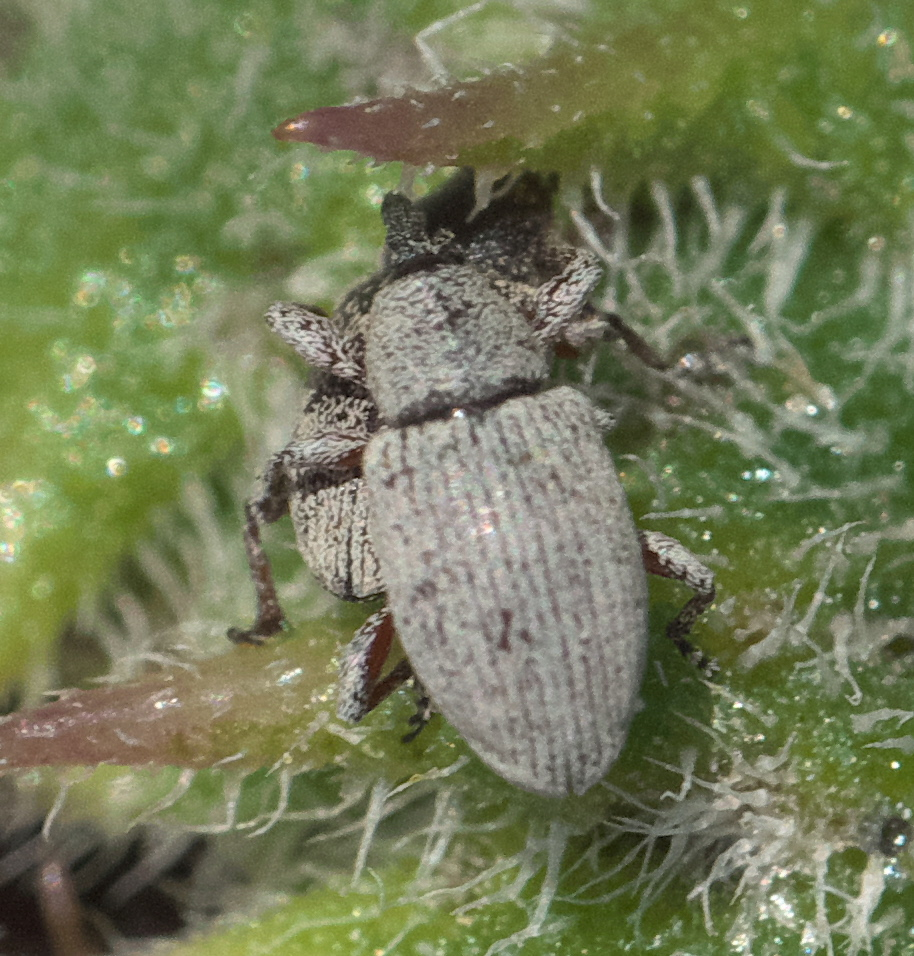
Smicronyx sordidus, grey sunflower seed weevil

== See also ==
- List of Smicronyx species
