= List of Conoderinae genera =

These 218 genera belong to Conoderinae, a subfamily of true weevils in the family Curculionidae. There are at least 2,400 described species in Conoderinae.

== Conoderinae genera ==
- Abrimoides Kojima & Lyal, 2002
- Acatus Marshall, 1930
- Achirozetes Heller, 1924
- Acopturus Heller, 1895
- Acoptus LeConte, 1876
- Agametina Heller, 1915
- Agametis Pascoe, 1870
- Agathorhinus Fairmaire, 1893
- Almetus Marshall, 1939
- Amorbaius Schoenherr, 1845
- Amphibleptus Marshall, 1939
- Anamelus Marshall, 1940
- Anascopus Marshall, 1935
- Anchicoryssomerus Voss, 1965
- Anchistosphilia Heller, 1894
- Annahowdenia Alonso-Zarazaga & Lyal
- Anobleptus Marshall, 1939
- Anthobaphus Faust, 1899
- Aphyocnemus Faust, 1898
- Aphyomerus Hartmann, 1904
- Apiophorus Roelofs, 1875
- Apsophus Hartmann, 1904
- Arachnobas Boisduval, 1835
- Arachnomorpha Champion, 1906
- Archocopturus Heller, 1895
- Atelephae Voss, 1940
- Balaninurus Heller, 1895
- Balanogastris Faust, 1898
- Barystrabus Hustache, 1932
- Borthus Marshall, 1939
- Brephiope Pascoe, 1874
- Brimoda Pascoe, 1871
- Brimoides Kojima & Lyal, 2002
- Caenochira Pascoe, 1885
- Caldaranthus Alonso-Zarazaga & Lyal
- Calophylaitis Heller, 1924
- Campyloscelus Schoenherr, 1845
- Chelothippia Marshall, 1938
- Chirozetes Pascoe, 1870
- Cledus Marshall, 1958
- Cnemoxys Marshall, 1956
- Colpothorax Desbrochers, 1890
- Conoderes Schoenherr, 1833
- Conradtiella Hustache, 1931
- Copturomimus Heller, 1895
- Copturomorpha Champion, 1906
- Copturosomus Heller, 1895
- Copturus Schönherr, 1825
- Cordierella Hustache, 1932
- Corynemerus Fahraeus, 1871
- Coryssopus Schoenherr, 1826
- Costolatychus Heller, 1906
- Coturpus R.S. Anderson, 1994
- Crassocopturus Rheinheimer, 2011
- Cratosomus Schoenherr, 1825
- Curanigus Faust, 1898
- Cylindrocopturinus Sleeper, 1963
- Cylindrocopturus Heller, 1895
- Cyllophorus Faust, 1886
- Daedania Pascoe, 1871
- Damurus Heller, 1895
- Decorseia Hustache, 1922
- Dichelotrox Heller, 1904
- Egiona Pascoe, 1874
- Elassophilus Faust, 1899
- Elattocerus Schoenherr, 1847
- Emexaure Pascoe, 1871
- Epiphylax Schoenherr, 1845
- Eucorynemerus Hustache, 1927
- Eulechriops Faust, 1896
- Euryommatus Roger, 1857
- Euzurus Champion, 1906
- Faustiella Berg, 1898
- Gandarius Fairmaire, 1902
- Ganyopis Pascoe, 1871
- Gronosphilia Hustache, 1931
- Guiomatus Faust, 1899
- Gurreanthus Alonso-Zarazaga & Lyal
- Haplocolus Marshall, 1956
- Hedycera Pascoe, 1870
- Helleriella Champion, 1906
- Hemicolpus Heller, 1895
- Histeropus Hustache, 1922
- Homoeometamelus Hustache, 1936
- Hoplitopales Schoenherr, 1843
- Hoplocopturus Heller, 1895
- Hypophylax Fairmaire, 1904
- Hypoplagius Desbrochers, 1891
- Hyposphilius Marshall, 1957
- Idopelma Faust, 1898
- Isocopturus Hustache, 1931
- Isomicrus Hartmann, 1904
- Kivuanella Hustache, 1934
- Kumozo Morimoto, 1960
- Lamitema Lea, 1910
- Lamyrus Schoenherr, 1847
- Larides Champion, 1906
- Latychellus Hustache, 1938
- Latychus Pascoe, 1872
- Lavabrenymus Hoffinann, 1966
- Lechriops Schönherr, 1825
- Lisporhinus Faust, 1886
- Lissoderes Champion, 1906
- Lissoglena Pascoe, 1874
- Lobops Schoenherr, 1845
- Lobotrachelus Schoenherr, 1838
- Machaerocnemis Heller, 1895
- Macramorbaeus Voss, 1971
- Macrocopturus Heller, 1895
- Macrolechriops Champion, 1906
- Macrotelephae Morimoto, 1960
- Macrotimorus Heller, 1895
- Marshallanthus Alonso-Zarazaga & Lyal
- Mecopoidellus Hustache, 1931
- Mecopomorphus Hustache, 1920
- Mecopus Schoenherr, 1825
- Menemachus Schoenherr, 1843
- Meneudetellus Hustache, 1937
- Meneudetus Faust, 1898
- Metamelus Faust, 1898
- Metastrabus Hustache, 1922
- Metetra Pascoe, 1874
- Metialma Pascoe, 1871
- Microzurus Heller, 1895
- Microzygops Champion, 1906
- Mnemyne Pascoe, 1880
- Mnemynurus Heller, 1895
- Neocampyloscelus Hustache, 1941
- Neocoryssopus Hustache, 1932
- Neomecopus Hustache, 1921
- Nipponosphadasmus Morimoto, 1959
- Odoacis Pascoe, 1865
- Odoanus Heller, 1929
- Odontomaches Schoenherr, 1843
- Odozetes Heller, 1922
- Oebrius Pascoe, 1874
- Olsufieffella Hustache, 1939
- Osphilia Pascoe, 1871
- Osphiliades Heller, 1894
- Othippia Pascoe, 1874
- Panigena Pascoe, 1874
- Panoptes Gerstaecker, 1860
- Paracorynemerus Hustache, 1928
- Paramnemyne Heller, 1895
- Paramnemynellus Hustache, 1932
- Parazygops Desbrochers, 1890
- Parepiphylax Hustache, 1934
- Parisocordylus Faust, 1895
- Pastolus Hustache, 1933
- Peleropsella Hustaehe, 1931
- Peloropus Schoenherr, 1836
- Peltophorus Schoenherr, 1845
- Pempheres Pascoe, 1871
- Pempheromima Heller, 1898
- Pempherulus Marshall, 1941
- Phacemastix Schoenherr, 1847
- Phaenomerus Schoenherr, 1836
- Phaulotrodes Faust, 1898
- Phileas Champion, 1906
- Philenis Champion, 1906
- Philides Champion, 1906
- Philinna Champion, 1906
- Phylaitis Pascoe, 1871
- Phylanticus Faust, 1898
- Piazolechriops Heller, 1906
- Piazurus Schoenherr, 1825
- Pinarus Schoenherr, 1826
- Platycleidus Faust, 1898
- Podeschrus Roelofs, 1875
- Poecilma Germar, 1821
- Poecilogaster Heller, 1895
- Procuranigus Hustache, 1928
- Psalistus Gerstaecker, 1871
- Pseniclea Pascoe, 1874
- Pseudopiazurus Heller, 1906
- Pseudopinarus Heller, 1906
- Psomus Casey, 1892
- Pycnorhinus Marshall, 1958
- Pycnosphilius Marshall, 1939
- Rhadinocerus Schoenherr, 1847
- Rhinolechriops Hustache, 1939
- Rhombicodes Marshall, 1947
- Rhynchorthus Marshall, 1953
- Rimboda Heller, 1925
- Saphicus Pascoe, 1886
- Scaphus Marshall, 1952
- Sceloprion Marshall, 1957
- Schoenherria Blanchard, 1853
- Scoliomerus Marshall, 1956
- Scolytoproctus Faust, 1895
- Scolytotarsus Schedl, 1937
- Scotoephilus Hartmann, 1904
- Sphadasmus Schoenherr, 1844
- Stasiastes Faust, 1895
- Sympiezopellus Hustache, 1931
- Sympiezopus Schoenherr, 1838
- Synergatus Berg, 1898
- Synophthalmus Lacordaire, 1863
- Tachylechriops Heller, 1895
- Talanthia Pascoe, 1871
- Talimanus Marshall, 1943
- Telephae Pascoe, 1870
- Temialma Lea, 1910
- Tetragonops Gerstaecker, 1855
- Tetragonopsella Hustache, 1931
- Timorus Schoenherr, 1838
- Tomicoproctus Faust, 1898
- Trichodocerus Chevrolat, 1879
- Turcopus R.S. Anderson, 1994
- Tydeotyrius Voss, 1958
- Tyriotes Pascoe, 1882
- Tyriotydeus Hustache, 1928
- Xeniella Hustache, 1931
- Zygops Schoenherr, 1825
- Zygopsella Champion, 1906
- † Doryaspis Chevrolat, 1844
- † Geratozygops Davis and Engel, 2006
