= Phaenomerus sundevalli =

Scientific classification
- Kingdom: Animalia
- Phylum: Arthropoda
- Clade: Pancrustacea
- Class: Insecta
- Order: Coleoptera
- Suborder: Polyphaga
- Infraorder: Cucujiformia
- Family: Curculionidae
- Subfamily: Conoderinae
- Tribe: Campyloscelini
- Genus: Phaenomerus
- Species: P. sundevalli

Binomial name
- Phaenomerus sundevalli Boheman & C.H., 1836

Species of beetle

Phaenomerus sundevalli, is a species of weevil found in India, Sri Lanka and Java.

== Biology and economic importance ==
It is known to attack sawn timber and logs of rubber wood.
