= List of Copturus species =

These 193 species belong to Copturus, a genus of true weevils in the family Curculionidae.

== Copturus species ==
- Copturus abnormis Heller, 1895
- Copturus adspersus J. Lec., 1876
- Copturus affaber Boheman, 1838
- Copturus aguacatae Kissinger, 1957
- Copturus albidus Champion, 1906
- Copturus albiventris Hustache, 1937
- Copturus albopictus Kirsch, 1875
- Copturus albosuturalis Hustache, 1937
- Copturus albotorquatus Heller, 1895
- Copturus amazonicus Heller, 1895
- Copturus amictus Hustache, 1937
- Copturus amoenus Champion, 1906
- Copturus angustus Hustache, 1937
- Copturus apicalis Kirsch, 1875
- Copturus argenteiventris Hustache, 1937
- Copturus armatus Gyllenhal, 1838
- Copturus atrosignatus Champion, 1906
- Copturus auritus Schoenherr, 1845
- Copturus avicularis Boheman, 1838
- Copturus batesi Hustache, 1932
- Copturus bellus Kirsch, 1875
- Copturus besckei Boheman, 1838
- Copturus bicinctus Champion, 1906
- Copturus binotatus J. Lec., 1876
- Copturus bisellatus Pascoe, 1880
- Copturus brevicollis Hustache, 1937
- Copturus brevis Waterh., 1875-82 (7
- Copturus carinatus Boheman, 1838
- Copturus cavisternus Hustache, 1937
- Copturus centralis Champion, 1906
- Copturus centropictus Fall, 1906
- Copturus chlorus Heller, 1895
- Copturus cincticollis Champion, 1906
- Copturus cinereolineatus Hustache, 1937
- Copturus cinnabarinus Hustache, 1937
- Copturus concinnus Boheman, 1845
- Copturus condecoratus Boheman, 1845
- Copturus confinis Boheman, 1845
- Copturus congoanus Hustache, 1928
- Copturus conjunctus Pascoe, 1880
- Copturus constrictus Champion, 1906
- Copturus conturbatus Heller, 1895
- Copturus convexicollis Kirsch, 1875
- Copturus corumbaensis Hustache, 1937
- Copturus coryphaeus Erichson, 1847
- Copturus costatus Boheman, 1838
- Copturus crassus Champion, 1925
- Copturus crenatus Heller, 1895
- Copturus cribricollis Champion, 1906
- Copturus cristulatus Hustache, 1937
- Copturus crux Pascoe, 1880
- Copturus cyphogaster Kirsch, 1875
- Copturus decussatus Heller, 1895
- Copturus dehiscens Fall, 1906
- Copturus deplanus Schoenherr, 1838
- Copturus dorsalis Kirsch, 1875
- Copturus dufani Hust., 1932
- Copturus dufaui Hustache, 1932
- Copturus episternalis Heller, 1895
- Copturus equatoriensis Hustache, 1937
- Copturus exaratus Champion, 1906
- Copturus femoralis Kirsch, 1875
- Copturus figuratus Boheman, 1845
- Copturus filicornis Fall, 1906
- Copturus floridanus (Fall, 1906)
- Copturus fulvocruciatus Champion, 1906
- Copturus fulvodorsalis Hustache, 1937
- Copturus fulvomaculatus Champion, 1906
- Copturus fulvosignatus Champion, 1906
- Copturus fulvus Hustache, 1937
- Copturus funebris Hustache, 1937
- Copturus furfuraceus Schoenherr, 1845
- Copturus gracilipes Champion, 1906
- Copturus gracilis Heller, 1895
- Copturus griseotessellatus Hustache, 1937
- Copturus guttula-alba Boh. in Schoenh., 1828
- Copturus guttulaalba Boheman, 1838
- Copturus histricus Champion, 1906
- Copturus horridus Fall, 1906
- Copturus ignicollis Champion, 1906
- Copturus infimus Boheman, 1838
- Copturus inornatus Kirsch, 1875
- Copturus jatrophae Fall, 1906
- Copturus laetus Heller, 1895
- Copturus lamella Dejean, 1835
- Copturus lamprothorax Heller, 1895
- Copturus lanio Erichson, 1847
- Copturus laterensis Boheman, 1845
- Copturus latifemoris Heller, 1895
- Copturus latior Heller, 1895
- Copturus latitarsis Champion, 1906
- Copturus lebasi Boh. in Schoenh., 1838
- Copturus lebasii Boheman, 1838
- Copturus leucoventris Hustache, 1931
- Copturus limolatus Fairm., 1880
- Copturus lineolatus Chevrolat, 1880
- Copturus littoralis Fall, 1906
- Copturus longulus J. Lec., 1876
- Copturus lucidus Hust., 1932
- Copturus ludiosus Boheman, 1838
- Copturus lunatus Hustache, 1937
- Copturus luteus Hustache, 1937
- Copturus lynceus Champion, 1906
- Copturus lyra Pascoe, 1880
- Copturus maculatus Boheman, 1845
- Copturus maculosus Champion, 1906
- Copturus marmoreus Heller, 1895
- Copturus mediinotus Fall, 1906
- Copturus megerlei Boheman, 1845
- Copturus mexicanus Heller, 1895
- Copturus miles Heller, 1895
- Copturus mimeticus Hespenheide, 1984
- Copturus mimus Heller, 1895
- Copturus minutus Hustache, 1937
- Copturus monostigma Hustache, 1937
- Copturus montezuma Champion, 1906
- Copturus multiguttatus Champion, 1906
- Copturus musculus Pasc., 1880
- Copturus musica Kirsch, 1875
- Copturus mutabilis Hustache, 1932
- Copturus nanulus Lec., 1876
- Copturus nebulosus Kirsch, 1875
- Copturus neohispanicus Heller, 1895
- Copturus niger Kirsch, 1875
- Copturus nigritarsis Hustache, 1931
- Copturus nigromaculatus Hustache, 1932
- Copturus nobilis Heller, 18895
- Copturus obliquefasciatus Hustache, 1937
- Copturus ocularis Kirsch, 1875
- Copturus oculatus Schoenherr, 1838
- Copturus operculatus Schoenherr, 1838
- Copturus ornatus Hustache, 1937
- Copturus osphiliades Hustache, 1937
- Copturus papaveratum Schoenherr, 1825
- Copturus paroticus Pascoe, 1880
- Copturus paschalis Hespenheide, 1984
- Copturus pectoralis Kirsch, 1875
- Copturus perdix Kirsch, 1875
- Copturus perseae Günther, 1935
- Copturus perturbatus Gyllenhal, 1838
- Copturus peruvianus Hustache, 1937
- Copturus pipa Schoenherr, 1838
- Copturus posticus Kirsch, 1875
- Copturus princeps Fall, 1906
- Copturus pulcher C.O. Waterh., 1879
- Copturus quadricinctus Heller, 1895
- Copturus quadricolor Champion, 1906
- Copturus quadridens Horn, 1894
- Copturus quercus Schoenherr, 1838
- Copturus rectirostris Hustache, 1937
- Copturus regalis Boheman, 1845
- Copturus rhombifer Heller, 1895
- Copturus rorulentus Boheman, 1838
- Copturus roseisignatus Boheman, 1838
- Copturus roseosignatus Boh. in Schoenh., 1838
- Copturus rubricollis Gyllenhal, 1838
- Copturus ruficeps Kirsch, 1875
- Copturus ruficollis Champion, 1906
- Copturus rufinasus Boh., 1859
- Copturus rufirostris Kirsch, 1875
- Copturus rugosipes Hustache, 1937
- Copturus sannio Gyllenhal, 1838
- Copturus satyrus Gyllenhal, 1838
- Copturus scapha Kirsch, 1869
- Copturus scolopax Heller, 1895
- Copturus semicitrinus Hustache, 1937
- Copturus semirufus Hustache, 1931
- Copturus senilis Schoenherr, 1845
- Copturus sericeus Champion, 1906
- Copturus severini Heller, 1895
- Copturus signaticollis Kirsch, 1875
- Copturus sobrinus Horn, 1895
- Copturus solieri Boheman, 1845
- Copturus subfasciatus Kirsch, 1875
- Copturus subulipennis Gyllenhal, 1838
- Copturus subundatus Boheman, 1845
- Copturus sulcatus Heller, 1895
- Copturus sulcifrons Kirsch, 1875
- Copturus tibialis Hustache, 1937
- Copturus torquatus Heller, 1895
- Copturus tricolor Champion, 1906
- Copturus trimaculata Motsch., 1866
- Copturus troglodytes Boheman, 1838
- Copturus ulula Schoenherr, 1838
- Copturus undatus Champion, 1906
- Copturus unifasciatus Champion, 1906
- Copturus variegatus Kirsch, 1875
- Copturus verrucosus Champion, 1906
- Copturus vestitus Boheman, 1838
- Copturus vicinus Hustache, 1937
- Copturus vitticollis Kirsch, 1875
- Copturus zurumorpha Hustache, 1937
- Copturus zygopsicus Heller, 1895
