= Panotes =

Panotes is a surname. Notable people with the surname include:

- Marisol Panotes, Filipino politician
- Rosemarie Panotes, Filipino politician

== See also ==
- Panoptes
