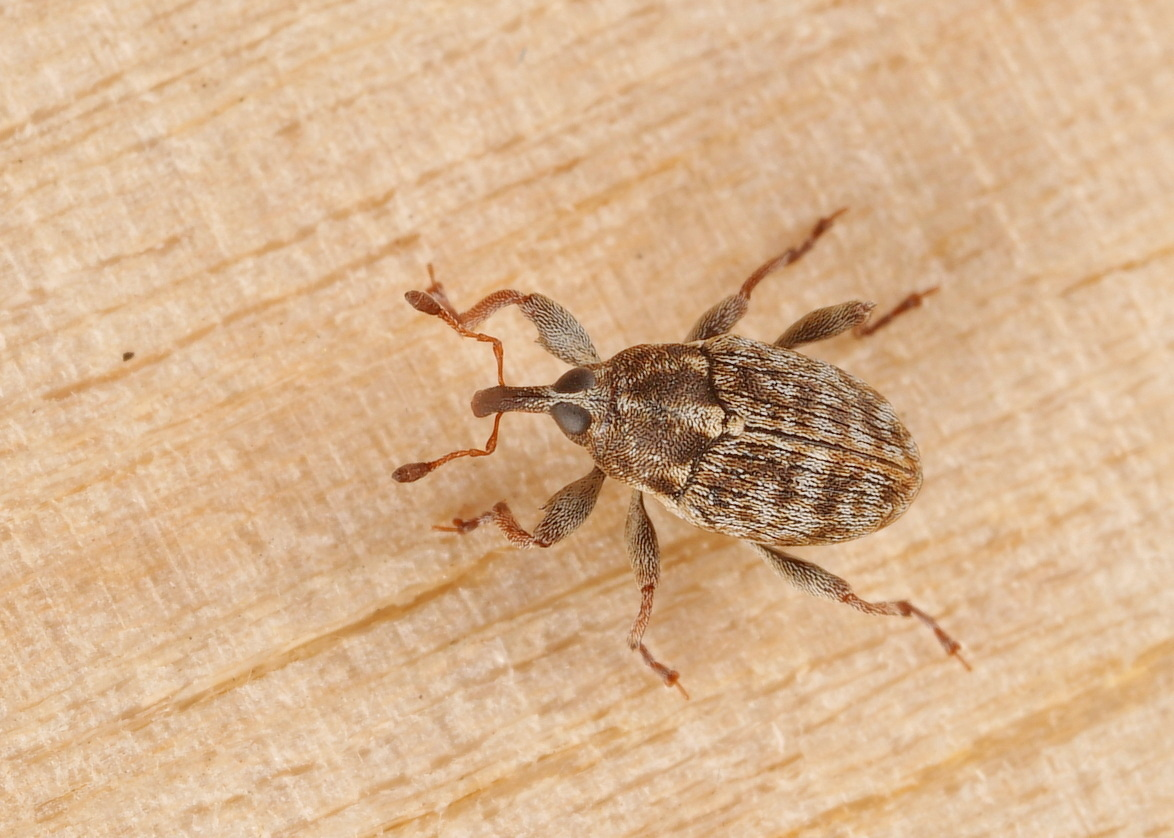
- "Coryssomerus capucinus"

Scientific classification
- Kingdom: Animalia
- Phylum: Arthropoda
- Class: Insecta
- Order: Coleoptera
- Suborder: Polyphaga
- Infraorder: Cucujiformia
- Family: Curculionidae
- Subfamily: Conoderinae
- Tribe: Coryssomerini; C.G. Thomson, 1859

Synonyms
- Coryssomerina C. G. Thomson, 1859 (original name); Metialmini Hustache, 1932; Synophthalmini Lacordaire, 1863

= Coryssomerini =

Tribe of beetles

The Coryssomerini are a tribe of weevil genera in the subfamily Conoderinae, erected by Carl Gustaf Thomson in 1859; this was based on the type genus Coryssomerus which some authorities (but not many databases) consider a synonym of Poecilma. This and other genera are well represented in (mainland) Europe and Asia.

== Genera ==
BioLib includes:

1. Coryssomerus Schönherr, 1826: synonym Poecilma Germar, 1821?
2. Euryommatus Roger, 1857
3. Metialma Pascoe, 1871
4. Osphilia Pascoe, 1871
5. Panoptes Gerstaecker, 1860 (monotypic)
6. Synophthalmus Lacordaire, 1863 (monotypic)
7. Talimanus G.A.K. Marshall, 1943
8. Tydeotyrius Voss, 1958 (monotypic)
