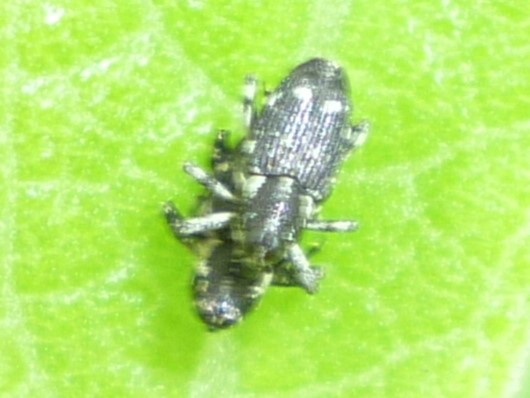

Scientific classification
- Domain: Eukaryota
- Kingdom: Animalia
- Phylum: Arthropoda
- Class: Insecta
- Order: Coleoptera
- Suborder: Polyphaga
- Infraorder: Cucujiformia
- Family: Curculionidae
- Genus: Cylindrocopturus
- Species: C. quercus

Binomial name
- Cylindrocopturus quercus (Say, 1831)

Synonyms
- Copturodes cavifrons Casey, 1897; Copturodes frontalis Casey, 1897

= Cylindrocopturus quercus =

Species of beetle

Cylindrocopturus quercus is a species of Zygopini (twig and stem weevils) in the family Curculionidae. It is found in North America.
