= Othippiini =

Scientific classification
- Kingdom: Animalia
- Phylum: Arthropoda
- Class: Insecta
- Order: Coleoptera
- Suborder: Polyphaga
- Infraorder: Cucujiformia
- Family: Curculionidae
- Subfamily: Conoderinae
- Tribe: Othippiini; Morimoto, 1962

Tribe of beetles

Othippiini is a tribe of true weevils in the beetle family Curculionidae. Of the eight genera in Othippiini, only Egiona and Othippia are not monotypic. Acoptus suturalis is the only species of the tribe found in the New World.

== Genera ==
These eight genera belong to the tribe Othippiini:

- Abrimoides Kojima & Lyal, 2002
- Acoptus LeConte, 1876
- Brimoda Pascoe, 1871
- Brimoides Kojima & Lyal, 2002
- Chelothippia Marshall, 1938
- Egiona Pascoe, 1874
- Othippia Pascoe, 1874
- Rimboda Heller, 1925
