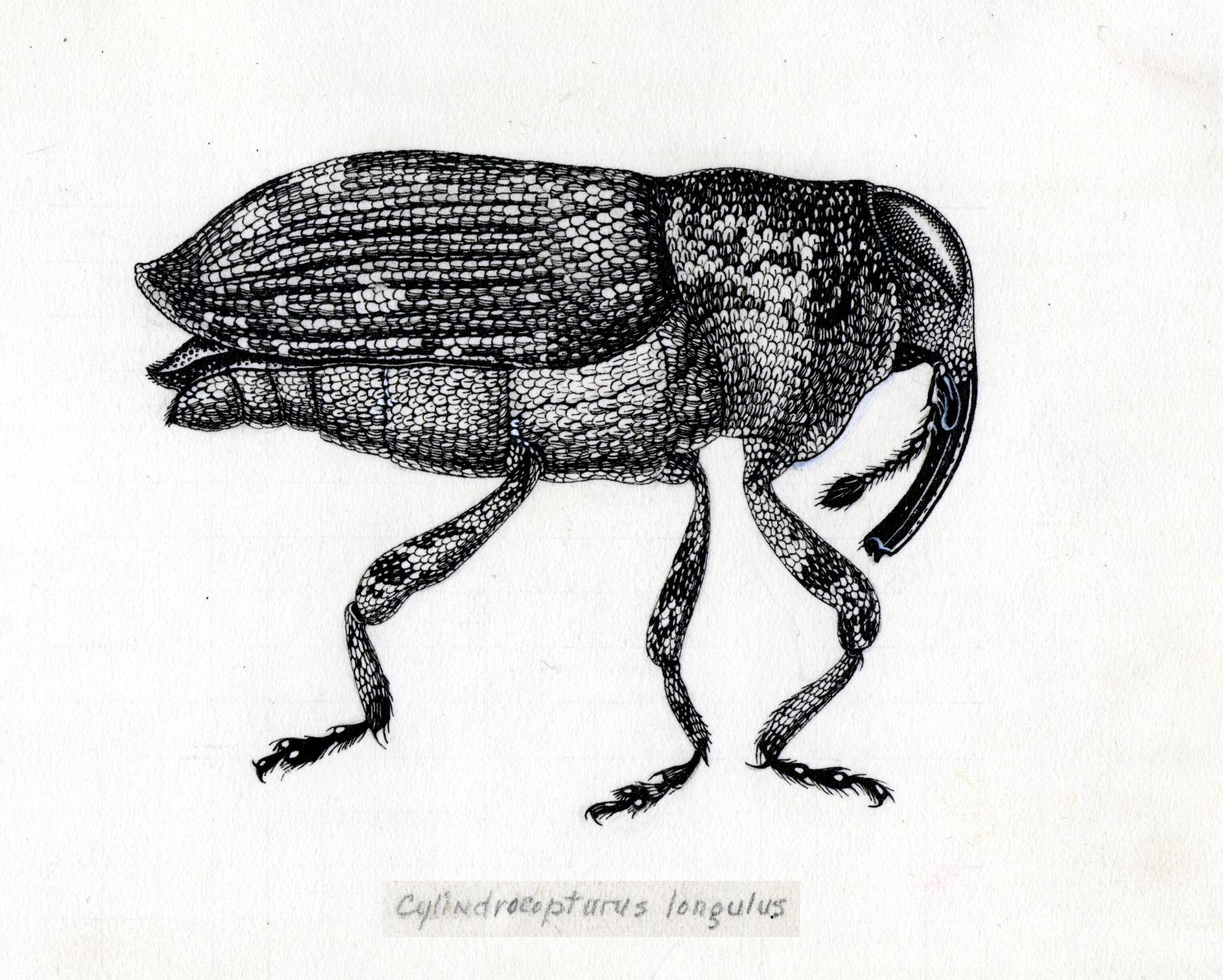
- Cylindrocopturus longulus

Scientific classification
- Domain: Eukaryota
- Kingdom: Animalia
- Phylum: Arthropoda
- Class: Insecta
- Order: Coleoptera
- Suborder: Polyphaga
- Infraorder: Cucujiformia
- Family: Curculionidae
- Subfamily: Conoderinae
- Tribe: Zygopini
- Genus: Cylindrocopturus; Heller, 1895

Species
- See text

= Cylindrocopturus =

Genus of beetles

Cylindrocopturus is a genus of weevil in the tribe Zygopini. It was initially described by Heller in 1895. Although included in the Lechriopini by some early sources, it has been included in the Zygopini in all more recent works. Species in Cylindrocopturus have an unmodified mesoventrite and do not have sclerolepidia. Two Cylindrocopturus species, C. eatoni and C. furnissi, are considered pests.

== Species ==
Known species of Cylindrocopturus are as follows:

- Cylindrocopturus adspersus
- Cylindrocopturus binotatus
- Cylindrocopturus centropictus
- Cylindrocopturus crassus
- Cylindrocopturus cretaceus
- Cylindrocopturus dehiscens
- Cylindrocopturus deleoni
- Cylindrocopturus eatoni
- Cylindrocopturus filicornis
- Cylindrocopturus floridanus
- Cylindrocopturus furnissi
- Cylindrocopturus helianthus
- Cylindrocopturus hemizoniae
- Cylindrocopturus horridus
- Cylindrocopturus jatrophae
- Cylindrocopturus littoralis
- Cylindrocopturus longulus
- Cylindrocopturus lunatus
- Cylindrocopturus mammillatus
- Cylindrocopturus medicatus
- Cylindrocopturus mediinotus
- Cylindrocopturus munitus
- Cylindrocopturus nanulus
- Cylindrocopturus operculatus
- Cylindrocopturus princeps
- Cylindrocopturus quercus
- Cylindrocopturus sinuatus
- Cylindrocopturus sparsus
- Cylindrocopturus unicolor
- Cylindrocopturus vanduzeei
