= Pseudolechriops =

Scientific classification
- Domain: Eukaryota
- Kingdom: Animalia
- Phylum: Arthropoda
- Class: Insecta
- Order: Coleoptera
- Suborder: Polyphaga
- Infraorder: Cucujiformia
- Family: Curculionidae
- Subfamily: Conoderinae
- Tribe: Lechriopini
- Genus: Pseudolechriops; Champion, 1906

Type species
- Pseudolechriops megacephala Champion, 1906

Genus of beetles

Pseudolechriops is a genus of Central American weevils alternatively placed in the subfamily Conoderinae or Baridinae. Established by the English entomologist George Charles Champion in 1906, the genus contained only one species, P. megacephala, until several related species were described in 2005.

== Species ==
- Pseudolechriops alleni Hespenheide & LaPierre, 2005
- Pseudolechriops coleyae Hespenheide & LaPierre, 2005
- Pseudolechriops davidsonae Hespenheide & LaPierre, 2005
- Pseudolechriops dimorpha Hespenheide & LaPierre, 2005
- Pseudolechriops howdenorum Hespenheide & LaPierre, 2005
- Pseudolechriops janeae Hespenheide & LaPierre, 2005
- Pseudolechriops klopferi Hespenheide & LaPierre, 2005
- Pseudolechriops longinoi Hespenheide & LaPierre, 2005
- Pseudolechriops megacephala Champion, 1906
- Pseudolechriops wrightae Hespenheide & LaPierre, 2005
