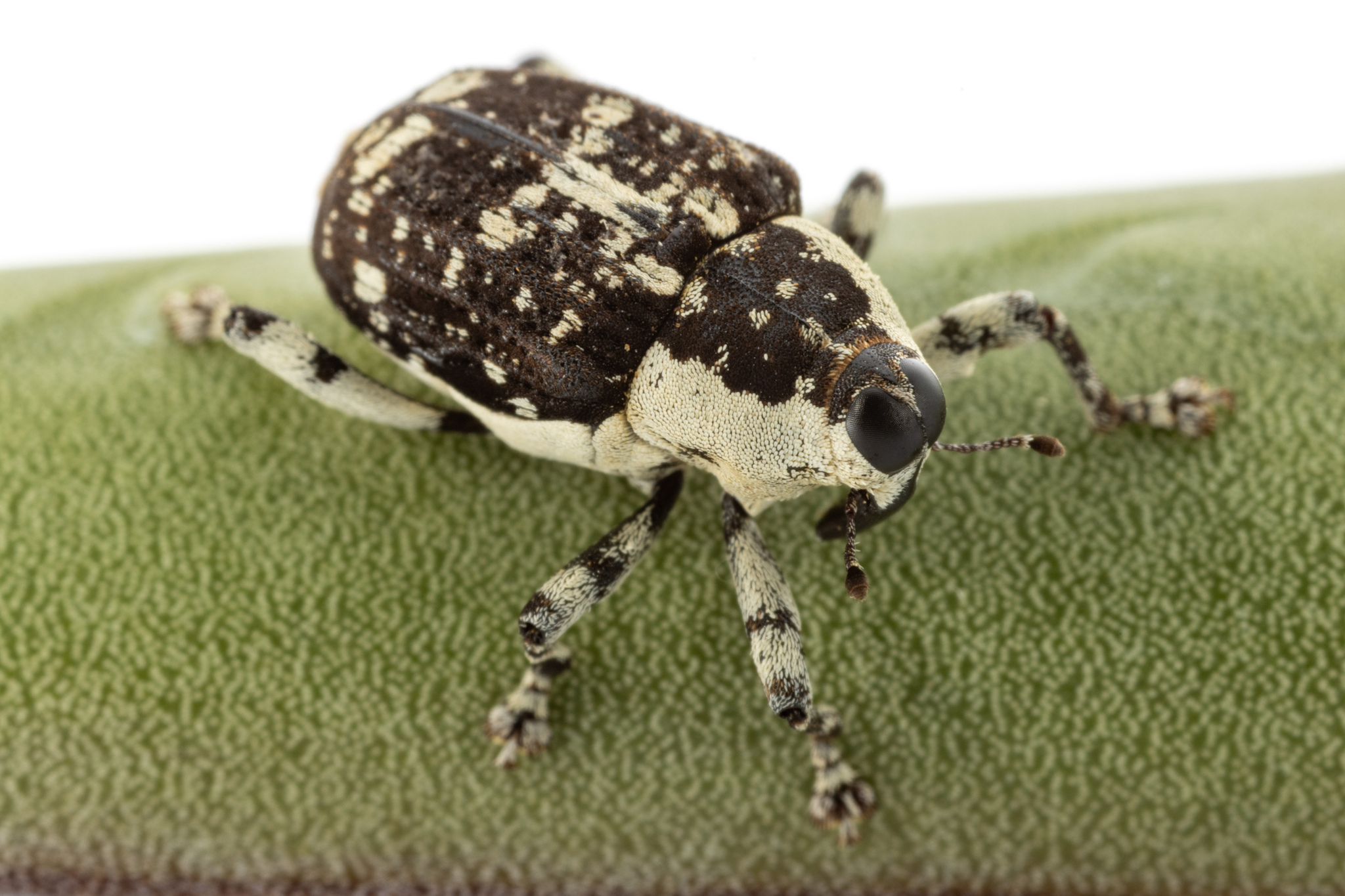
- Peltophorus polymitus, Arizona

Scientific classification
- Kingdom: Animalia
- Phylum: Arthropoda
- Clade: Pancrustacea
- Class: Insecta
- Order: Coleoptera
- Suborder: Polyphaga
- Infraorder: Cucujiformia
- Superfamily: Curculionoidea
- Family: Curculionidae
- Subfamily: Conoderinae
- Tribe: Zygopini
- Genus: Peltophorus; Schoenherr, 1845

Synonyms
- Opalocetus Desbrochers, 1910; Poltophorus Heller, 1895

= Peltophorus (beetle) =

Genus of beetles

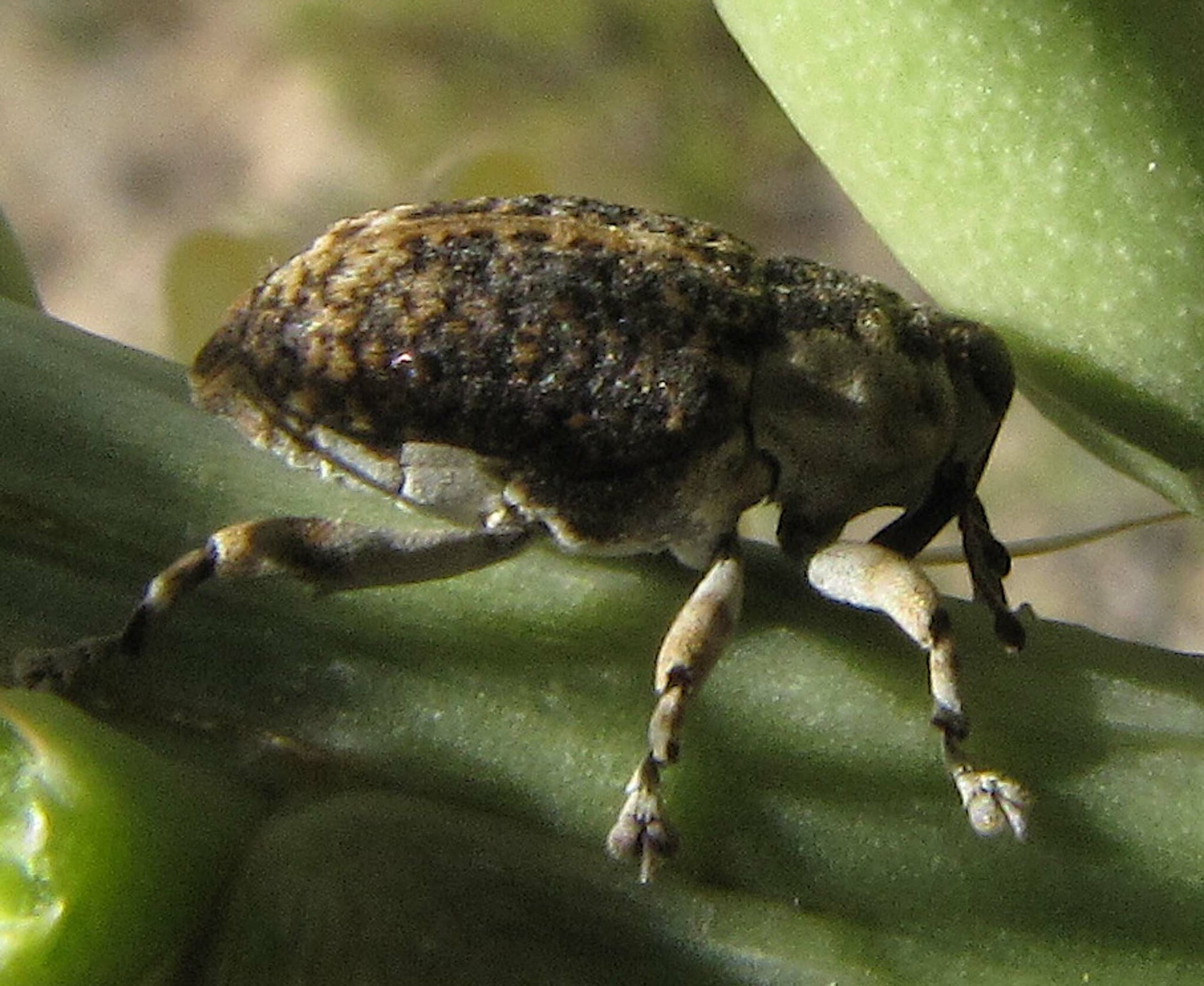
Peltophorus adustus, Arizona

Peltophorus is a genus of twig and stem weevils in the beetle family Curculionidae. There are about four described species in Peltophorus, found in Central and North America.

== Species ==
These species belong to the genus Peltophorus:

- Peltophorus adustus (Fall, 1906)
- Peltophorus commidendri Decelle, 1972 (provisional)
- Peltophorus jordani Heller, 1895 (provisional)
- Peltophorus polymitus Boheman, 1845
