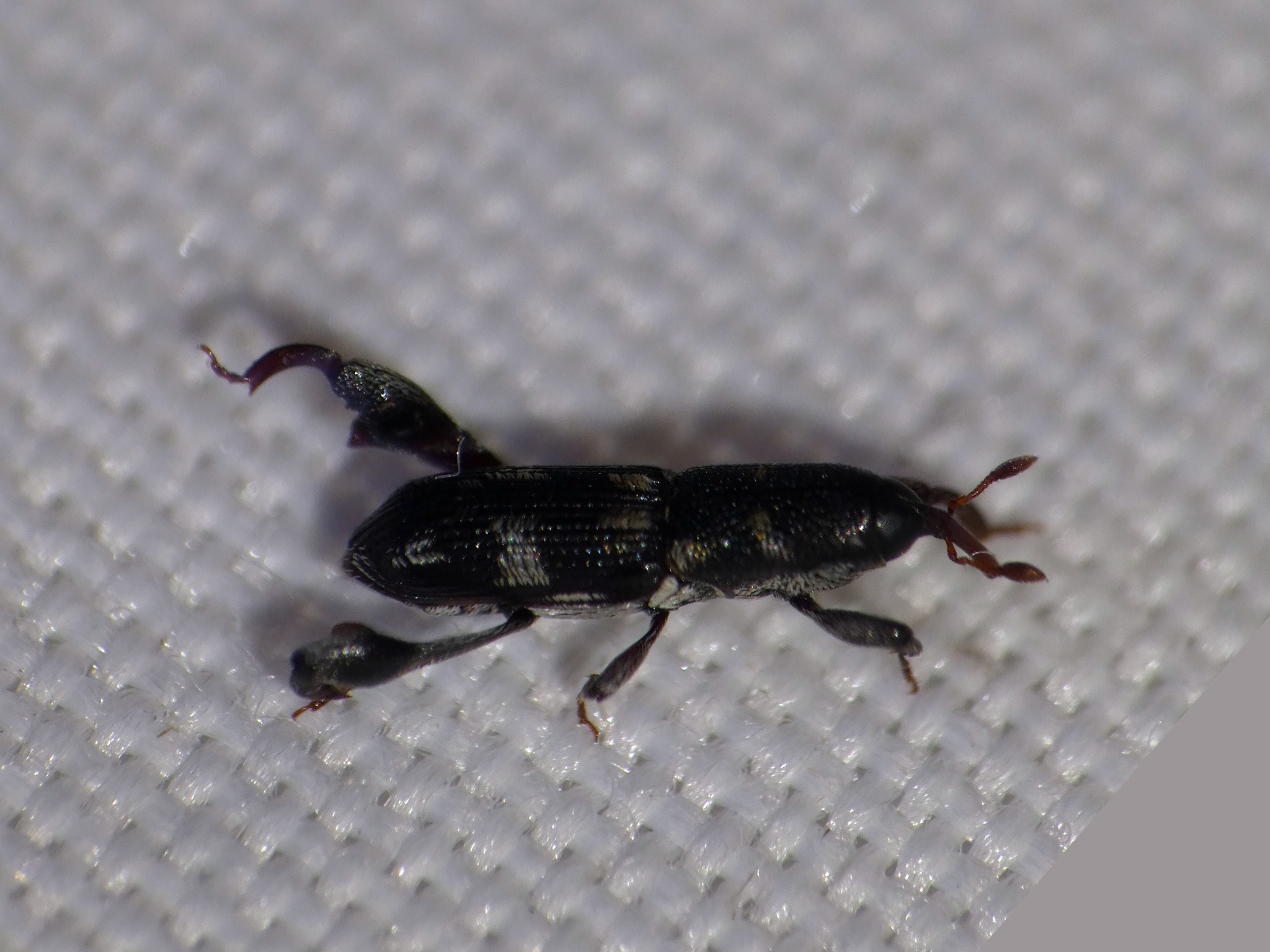
- Phaenomerus foveipennis

Scientific classification
- Kingdom: Animalia
- Phylum: Arthropoda
- Clade: Pancrustacea
- Class: Insecta
- Order: Coleoptera
- Suborder: Polyphaga
- Infraorder: Cucujiformia
- Superfamily: Curculionoidea
- Family: Curculionidae
- Subfamily: Conoderinae
- Tribe: Campyloscelini
- Genus: Phaenomerus; C.J. Schönherr, 1836

Synonyms
- Alesirhinus Fairmaire, 1898; Alsirrhinus Csiki, 1936; Phaenoemerus Hoffmann, 1968; Phenomerus Laporte de Castelnau, 1840

= Phaenomerus =

Genus of beetles

External image
- Images at iNaturalist

Phaenomerus is a genus of weevils in the subfamily subfamily Conoderinae and tribe Campyloscelini, erected by Carl Schönherr in 1836. Species have been recorded from Africa and S.E Asia (Indochina, Malesia) through to New Guinea and Australia.

== Species ==
The Global Biodiversity Information Facility lists:

- Phaenomerus affinis Hustache, 1934
- Phaenomerus albiventris Hustache, 1936
- Phaenomerus ambonensis Thompson, 1996
- Phaenomerus angulicollis Marshall, 1917
- Phaenomerus ater Thompson, 1996
- Phaenomerus auriceps Thompson, 1996
- Phaenomerus auricomus Thompson, 1996
- Phaenomerus bicavicollis Marshall, 1954
- Phaenomerus bilineatus L.Fairmaire, 1901
- Phaenomerus brevipennis Voss, 1957
- Phaenomerus brevirostris Marshall, 1917
- Phaenomerus canalipectus Thompson, 1996
- Phaenomerus carbonarius Thompson, 1996
- Phaenomerus cavipectus Thompson, 1996
- Phaenomerus contrarius Thompson, 1996
- Phaenomerus conturbator Thompson, 1996
- Phaenomerus delicatulus Hustache, 1932
- Phaenomerus densleonis Thompson, 1996
- Phaenomerus dolosus Marshall, 1954
- Phaenomerus excelsior Thompson, 1996
- Phaenomerus exilis F.P.Pascoe, 1873
- Phaenomerus figuratus J.Faust, 1894
- Phaenomerus fuliginosus Thompson, 1996
- Phaenomerus glabratus J.Faust, 1894
- Phaenomerus heveae Voss, 1957
- Phaenomerus hirtipectus Marshall, 1954
- Phaenomerus hirtus Hustache, 1932
- Phaenomerus hornabrooki Thompson, 1996
- Phaenomerus insularis Thompson, 1996
- Phaenomerus jucundus J.Faust, 1895
- Phaenomerus kalamanus Thompson, 1996
- Phaenomerus katangae Marshall, 1954
- Phaenomerus kraatzi J.Faust, 1898
- Phaenomerus laevicollis Marshall, 1954
- Phaenomerus laminifer Thompson, 1996
- Phaenomerus latus Hustache, 1936
- Phaenomerus leucogrammus Gerstaecker
- Phaenomerus lineatus F.P.Pascoe, 1885
- Phaenomerus lineolatus L.Fairmaire, 1898
- Phaenomerus longipilis Hustache, 1938
- Phaenomerus minutus Thompson, 1996
- Phaenomerus montanus Voss, 1961
- Phaenomerus nebulosus Motschulsky & V.de, 1863
- Phaenomerus nodieri Hustache, 1932
- Phaenomerus notatus F.P.Pascoe, 1873
- Phaenomerus occultus Thompson, 1996
- Phaenomerus okapicus Thompson, 1996
- Phaenomerus parvulus Voss, 1961
- Phaenomerus peregrinator Thompson, 1996
- Phaenomerus pertenuis Thompson, 1996
- Phaenomerus pubescens Marshall, 1954
- Phaenomerus reclinatus Marshall, 1924
- Phaenomerus riedeli Thompson, 1996
- Phaenomerus salomonicus Thompson, 1996
- Phaenomerus scenicus J.Faust, 1898
- Phaenomerus slamatensis Voss, 1961
- Phaenomerus striga J.Faust, 1899
- Phaenomerus strigicollis J.Faust, 1894
- Phaenomerus sundevalli C.H.Boheman, 1836
- Phaenomerus sundewalli Boheman, 1836
- Phaenomerus teretirostris Thompson, 1996
- Phaenomerus terraereginae Thompson, 1996
