= Psomus armatus =

Scientific classification
- Domain: Eukaryota
- Kingdom: Animalia
- Phylum: Arthropoda
- Class: Insecta
- Order: Coleoptera
- Suborder: Polyphaga
- Infraorder: Cucujiformia
- Family: Curculionidae
- Genus: Psomus
- Species: P. armatus

Binomial name
- Psomus armatus (Dietz, 1891)

Synonyms
- Psomus politus Casey, 1892

Species of beetle

Psomus armatus is a species of true weevil in the beetle family Curculionidae. The species is found in North America.
