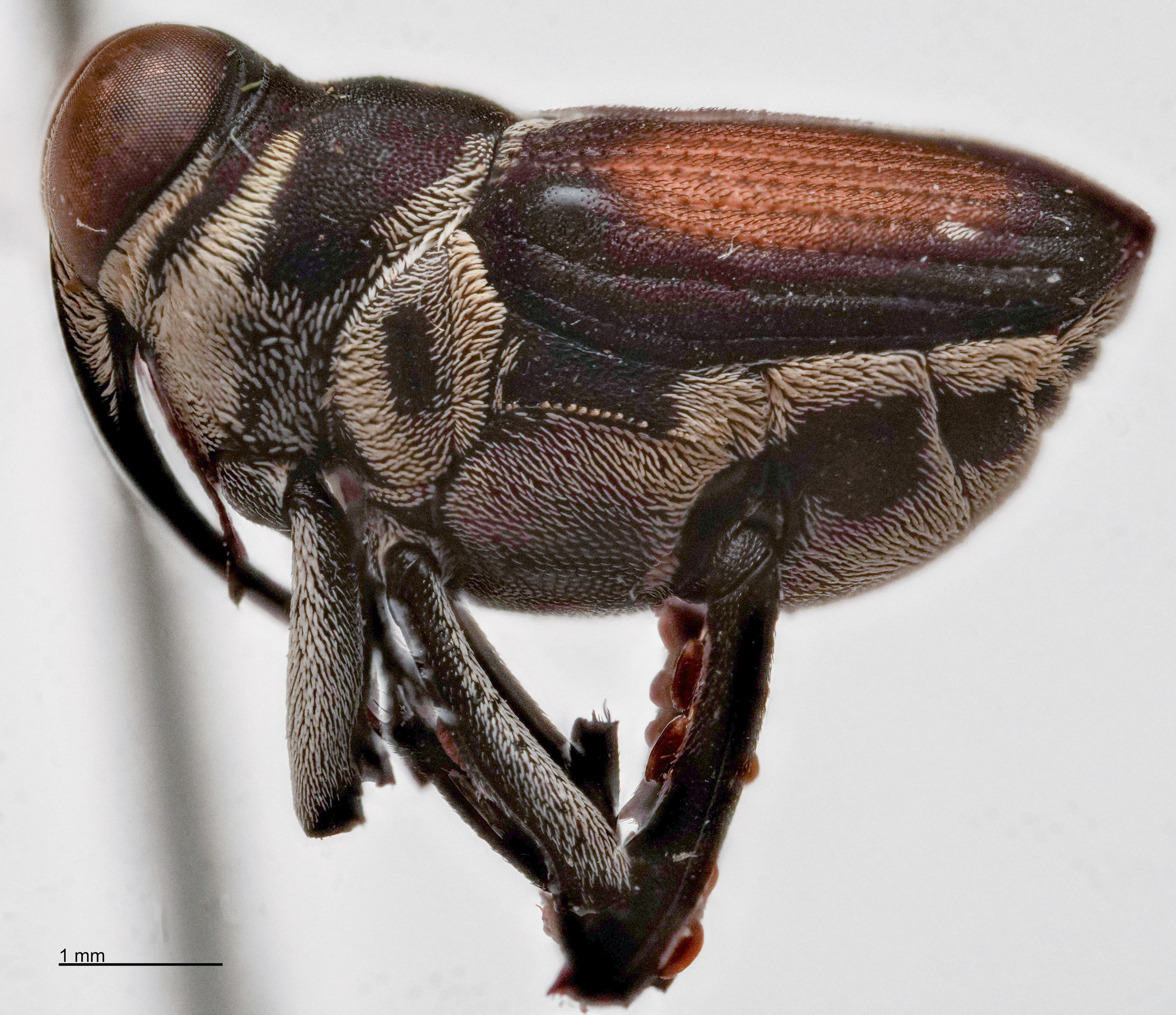
- Macrocopturus suturalis

Scientific classification
- Kingdom: Animalia
- Phylum: Arthropoda
- Clade: Pancrustacea
- Class: Insecta
- Order: Coleoptera
- Suborder: Polyphaga
- Infraorder: Cucujiformia
- Superfamily: Curculionoidea
- Family: Curculionidae
- Subfamily: Conoderinae
- Tribe: Lechriopini
- Genus: Macrocopturus; Heller, 1895

= Macrocopturus =

Genus of weevils

Macrocopturus is a genus of weevils that reside in North America, Central America, and the Caribbean.

== Taxonomy ==
Macrocopturus contains the following species:

- Macrocopturus martae
- Macrocopturus torquatus
- Macrocopturus neohispanicus
- Macrocopturus avicularis
- Macrocopturus ludiosus
- Macrocopturus lamella
- Macrocopturus floridanus
- Macrocopturus lunifer
- Macrocopturus suturalis
- Macrocopturus nobilis
- Macrocopturus albotorquatus
- Macrocopturus venustus
- Macrocopturus quadricinctus
- Macrocopturus tricolor
- Macrocopturus deplanus
- Macrocopturus basalis
- Macrocopturus aguacatae
- Macrocopturus satyrus
- Macrocopturus richardpackeri
- Macrocopturus rhombifer
