= Copturomorpha =

Scientific classification
- Kingdom: Animalia
- Phylum: Arthropoda
- Class: Insecta
- Order: Coleoptera
- Suborder: Polyphaga
- Infraorder: Cucujiformia
- Family: Curculionidae
- Subfamily: Conoderinae
- Tribe: Lechriopini
- Genus: Copturomorpha; Champion, 1906

Genus of beetles

Copturomorpha is a genus of true weevils in the beetle family Curculionidae. There are more than 20 described species in Copturomorpha, found in North, Central, and South America.

== Species ==
These 24 species belong to the genus Copturomorpha:

- Copturomorpha 11-notata Champion, 1906
- Copturomorpha albomaculatus Champion, 1906
- Copturomorpha albosignatus Champion, 1906
- Copturomorpha brevicornis Hustache, 1938
- Copturomorpha diffusa Hustache, 1938
- Copturomorpha dispersa Hustache, 1938
- Copturomorpha episternalis Hustache, 1938
- Copturomorpha fulva Hustache, 1938
- Copturomorpha funerea Champion, 1906
- Copturomorpha interrupta Champion, 1906
- Copturomorpha leucosticta Champion, 1906
- Copturomorpha musica Champion, 1906
- Copturomorpha mutica Hustache, 1938
- Copturomorpha nigricornis Hustache, 1938
- Copturomorpha nigrobasalis Hustache, 1938
- Copturomorpha oblongula Hustache, 1938
- Copturomorpha obscura Hustache, 1938
- Copturomorpha ochracea Hustache, 1938
- Copturomorpha ornata Hustache, 1938
- Copturomorpha rileyi New
- Copturomorpha rugipennis Champion, 1906
- Copturomorpha seriata Hustache, 1938
- Copturomorpha signatella Hustache, 1938
- Copturomorpha variegata Hustache, 1938
