= Cylindrocopturus mediinotus =

Scientific classification
- Domain: Eukaryota
- Kingdom: Animalia
- Phylum: Arthropoda
- Class: Insecta
- Order: Coleoptera
- Suborder: Polyphaga
- Infraorder: Cucujiformia
- Family: Curculionidae
- Genus: Cylindrocopturus
- Species: C. mediinotus

Binomial name
- Cylindrocopturus mediinotus (Fall, 1906)

Species of beetle

Cylindrocopturus mediinotus is a species of true weevil in the beetle family Curculionidae. It is found in North America.
