= Cylindrocopturinus pictus =

Scientific classification
- Kingdom: Animalia
- Phylum: Arthropoda
- Clade: Pancrustacea
- Class: Insecta
- Order: Coleoptera
- Suborder: Polyphaga
- Infraorder: Cucujiformia
- Family: Curculionidae
- Genus: Cylindrocopturinus
- Species: C. pictus

Binomial name
- Cylindrocopturinus pictus (Schaeffer, 1908)

Species of beetle

Cylindrocopturinus pictus is a species of true weevil in the beetle family Curculionidae. It is found in North America, Central America, and the Caribbean.
