= Peltophorus polymitus =

Scientific classification
- Kingdom: Animalia
- Phylum: Arthropoda
- Class: Insecta
- Order: Coleoptera
- Suborder: Polyphaga
- Infraorder: Cucujiformia
- Family: Curculionidae
- Genus: Peltophorus
- Species: P. polymitus

Binomial name
- Peltophorus polymitus Boheman, 1845

Synonyms
- Zygops leopardinus Desbrochers, 1891; Zygops seminiveus LeConte, 1884; Zygops suffusus Casey, 1892

Species of beetle

Peltophorus polymitus is a species of true weevil in the beetle family Curculionidae. It is found in North America. Both adults and larvae are pests of agave plants, feeding on leaves and needles.

== Subspecies ==
These two subspecies belong to the species Peltophorus polymitus:

- Peltophorus polymitus seminiveus^{b}
- Peltophorus polymitus suffusus^{b}

Data sources: i = ITIS, c = Catalogue of Life, g = GBIF, b = Bugguide.net
