= Cylindrocopturus nanulus =

Scientific classification
- Kingdom: Animalia
- Phylum: Arthropoda
- Class: Insecta
- Order: Coleoptera
- Suborder: Polyphaga
- Infraorder: Cucujiformia
- Family: Curculionidae
- Genus: Cylindrocopturus
- Species: C. nanulus

Binomial name
- Cylindrocopturus nanulus (LeConte, 1876)

Synonyms
- Copturodes floridanus Casey, 1897

Species of beetle

Cylindrocopturus nanulus is a species of true weevil in the beetle family Curculionidae. It is found in North America.
