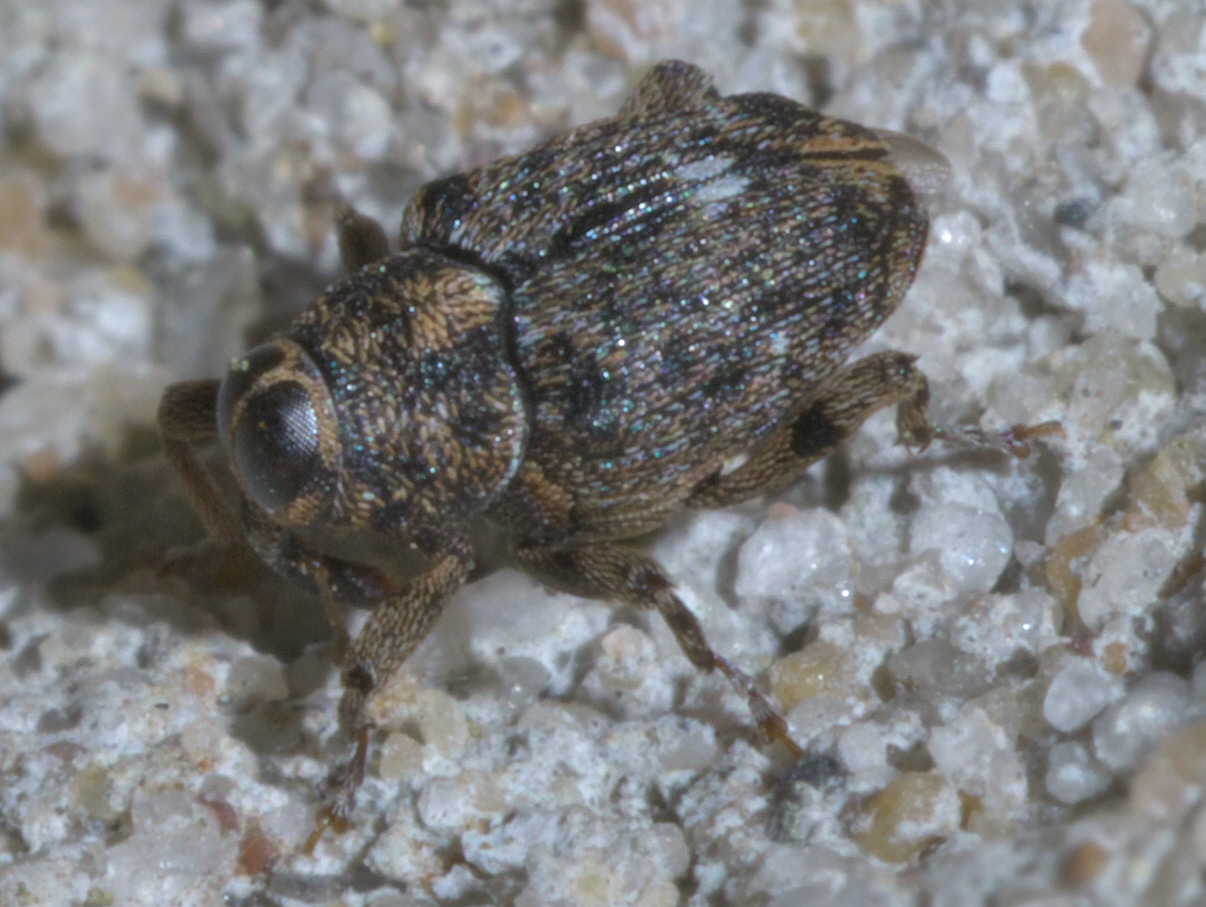

Scientific classification
- Kingdom: Animalia
- Phylum: Arthropoda
- Clade: Pancrustacea
- Class: Insecta
- Order: Coleoptera
- Suborder: Polyphaga
- Infraorder: Cucujiformia
- Family: Curculionidae
- Genus: Lechriops
- Species: L. oculatus

Binomial name
- Lechriops oculatus (Say, 1824)

= Lechriops oculatus =

Species of beetle

Lechriops oculatus is a species of true weevil in the beetle family Curculionidae.
