= Hypophylax =

Scientific classification
- Kingdom: Animalia
- Phylum: Arthropoda
- Class: Insecta
- Order: Coleoptera
- Suborder: Polyphaga
- Infraorder: Cucujiformia
- Family: Curculionidae
- Subfamily: Conoderinae
- Tribe: Campyloscelini
- Genus: Hypophylax; Fairmaire, 1904
- Species: H. hylastoides

Binomial name
- Hypophylax hylastoides Fairmaire, 1903

Genus of beetles

Hypophylax is a genus of weevils from Madagascar, in the subfamily Conoderinae and tribe Campyloscelini; it was erected by Fairmaire in 1904. It contains the single species Hypophylax hylastoides.
