= Peltophorus adustus =

Scientific classification
- Domain: Eukaryota
- Kingdom: Animalia
- Phylum: Arthropoda
- Class: Insecta
- Order: Coleoptera
- Suborder: Polyphaga
- Infraorder: Cucujiformia
- Family: Curculionidae
- Genus: Peltophorus
- Species: P. adustus

Binomial name
- Peltophorus adustus (Fall, 1906)

Species of beetle

Peltophorus adustus is a species of true weevil in the beetle family Curculionidae. It is found in North America.
