= Copturus floridanus =

Scientific classification
- Domain: Eukaryota
- Kingdom: Animalia
- Phylum: Arthropoda
- Class: Insecta
- Order: Coleoptera
- Suborder: Polyphaga
- Infraorder: Cucujiformia
- Family: Curculionidae
- Genus: Copturus
- Species: C. floridanus

Binomial name
- Copturus floridanus (Fall, 1906)

Synonyms
- Pizazurus floridanus Fall, 1906

Species of beetle

Copturus floridanus is a species of true weevil in the beetle family Curculionidae. It is found in North America. It was recombined from Pizazurus floridanus Fall, 1906 to Copturus floridanus (Fall, 1906) in Sleeper, 1963
