= Egiona =

Scientific classification
- Kingdom: Animalia
- Phylum: Arthropoda
- Class: Insecta
- Order: Coleoptera
- Suborder: Polyphaga
- Infraorder: Cucujiformia
- Family: Curculionidae
- Subfamily: Conoderinae
- Tribe: Othippiini
- Genus: Egiona; Pascoe, 1874

Genus of beetles

Egiona is a genus of true weevils in the beetle family Curculionidae. There are at least three described species in Egiona.

== Species ==
These three species belong to the genus Egiona:

- Egiona circumcincta Voss, 1953
- Egiona konoi Nakane, 1963
- Egiona laeta Pascoe, 1874
