= Othippia =

Scientific classification
- Kingdom: Animalia
- Phylum: Arthropoda
- Class: Insecta
- Order: Coleoptera
- Suborder: Polyphaga
- Infraorder: Cucujiformia
- Family: Curculionidae
- Subfamily: Conoderinae
- Tribe: Othippiini
- Genus: Othippia; Pascoe, 1874

Genus of beetles

Othippia is a genus of true weevils in the beetle family Curculionidae. There are more than 20 described species in Othippia.

== Species ==
These 26 species belong to the genus Othippia:

- Othippia affinis Heller, 1894
- Othippia albilateralis Heller, 1925
- Othippia albilateris Heller, 1925
- Othippia arcufer Hustache, 1932
- Othippia continentalis Heller, 1894
- Othippia distigma Pascoe, 1874
- Othippia funebris Pascoe, 1874
- Othippia gibbicollis Hustache, 1932
- Othippia guttula Pascoe, 1885
- Othippia impesca Hell., 1921
- Othippia impexa Heller, 1922
- Othippia jubata Pascoe, 1874
- Othippia luteipes Hustache, 1956
- Othippia micros Hustache, 1932
- Othippia minuscula Hustache, 1932
- Othippia minuta Heller, 1894
- Othippia murina Heller, 1925
- Othippia picticollis Heller, 1929
- Othippia podagrica Pascoe, 1874
- Othippia proletaria Pascoe, 1874
- Othippia pygmaea Hustache, 1932
- Othippia revocata Heller, 1894
- Othippia semisuturalis Hustache, 1956
- Othippia serratula Heller, 1894
- Othippia unicolor Heller, 1894
- Othippia urbana Faust, 1898
