= Cylindrocopturus eatoni =

Scientific classification
- Domain: Eukaryota
- Kingdom: Animalia
- Phylum: Arthropoda
- Class: Insecta
- Order: Coleoptera
- Suborder: Polyphaga
- Infraorder: Cucujiformia
- Family: Curculionidae
- Genus: Cylindrocopturus
- Species: C. eatoni

Binomial name
- Cylindrocopturus eatoni Buchanan, 1940

Species of beetle

Cylindrocopturus eatoni is a species of weevil commonly found in Oregon. The adults of the species are black and densely covered with grayish scales. The species is a good flier, but it often hops when disturbed, which is why it is often mistaken for a leafhopper. It lays its eggs singly in niches excavated in the bark of a main stem and its twigs. Cream-colored larvae hatch a few days later and begin tunneling in the outer layers of the roots, feeding on the phloem and xylem. The larvae pupate in spring. The species eats young ponderosa and Jeffrey pines. Its common name is pine reproduction weevil.
