= Cylindrocopturus operculatus =

Scientific classification
- Domain: Eukaryota
- Kingdom: Animalia
- Phylum: Arthropoda
- Class: Insecta
- Order: Coleoptera
- Suborder: Polyphaga
- Infraorder: Cucujiformia
- Family: Curculionidae
- Genus: Cylindrocopturus
- Species: C. operculatus

Binomial name
- Cylindrocopturus operculatus (Say, 1824)

Synonyms
- Copturodes missourianus Casey, 1896

Species of beetle

Cylindrocopturus operculatus is a species of true weevil in the beetle family Curculionidae. It is found in North America.
