= Piazurini =

Scientific classification
- Kingdom: Animalia
- Phylum: Arthropoda
- Class: Insecta
- Order: Coleoptera
- Suborder: Polyphaga
- Infraorder: Cucujiformia
- Family: Curculionidae
- Subfamily: Conoderinae
- Tribe: Piazurini; Lacordaire, 1865

Tribe of beetles

Piazurini is a tribe of true weevils in the beetle family Curculionidae. There are about 12 genera and more than 400 described species in Piazurini.

== Genera ==
These 12 genera belong to the tribe Piazurini:

- Costolatychus Heller, 1906
- Cratosomus Schoenherr, 1825
- Guiomatus Faust, 1899
- Hedycera Pascoe, 1870
- Latychellus Hustache, 1938
- Latychus Pascoe, 1872
- Lobops Schoenherr, 1845
- Piazolechriops Heller, 1906
- Piazurus Schoenherr, 1825
- Pinarus Schoenherr, 1826
- Pseudopiazurus Heller, 1906
- Pseudopinarus Heller, 1906
