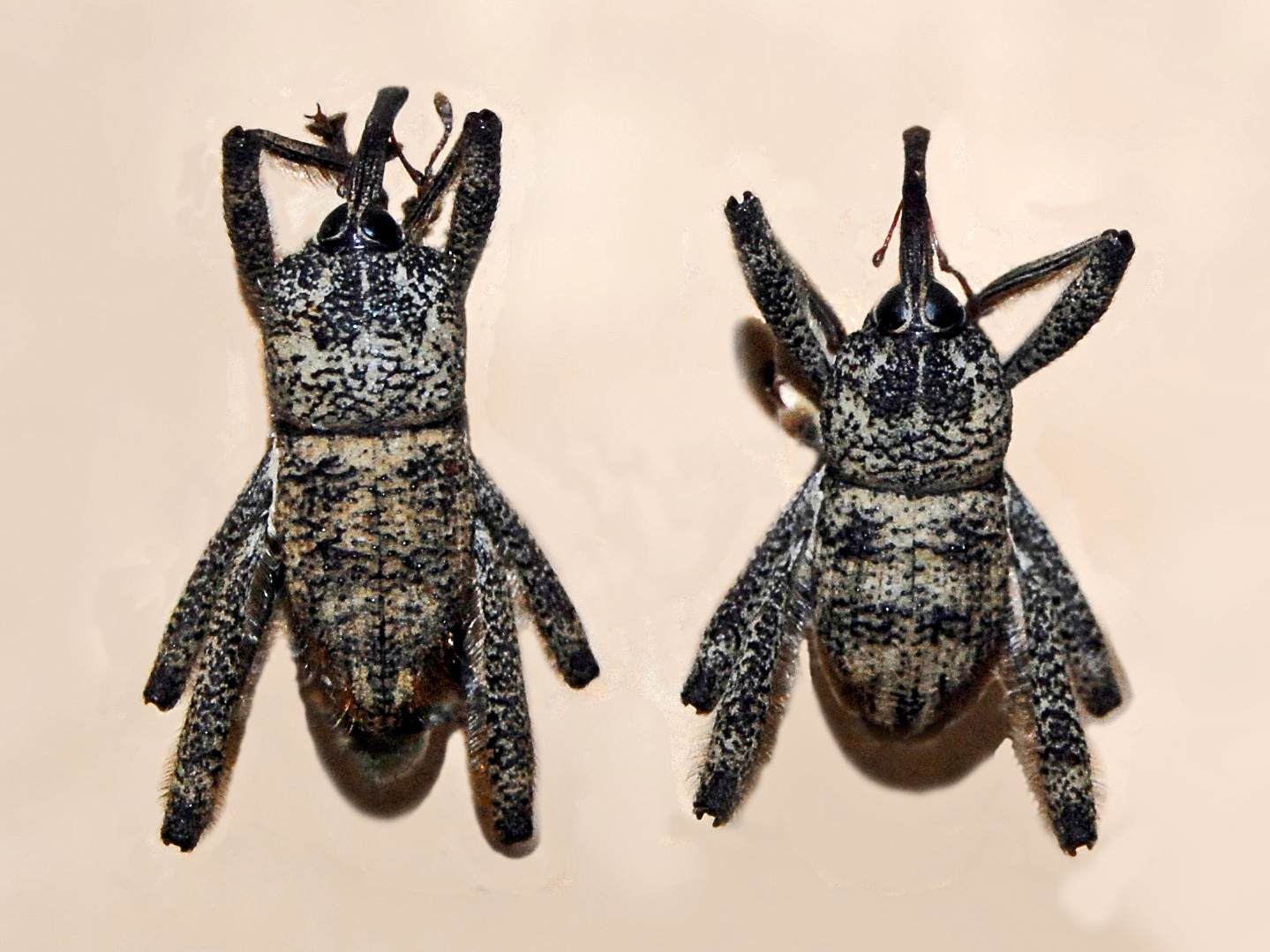
- Arachnobas sectator from Papua New Guinea

Scientific classification
- Kingdom: Animalia
- Phylum: Arthropoda
- Class: Insecta
- Order: Coleoptera
- Suborder: Polyphaga
- Infraorder: Cucujiformia
- Family: Curculionidae
- Genus: Arachnobas
- Species: A. sectator

Binomial name
- Arachnobas sectator Faust, 1899

Synonyms
- Arachnopus sectator

= Arachnobas sectator =

Species of beetle

Arachnobas sectator is a species of the true weevil family. It occurs in Papua New Guinea
