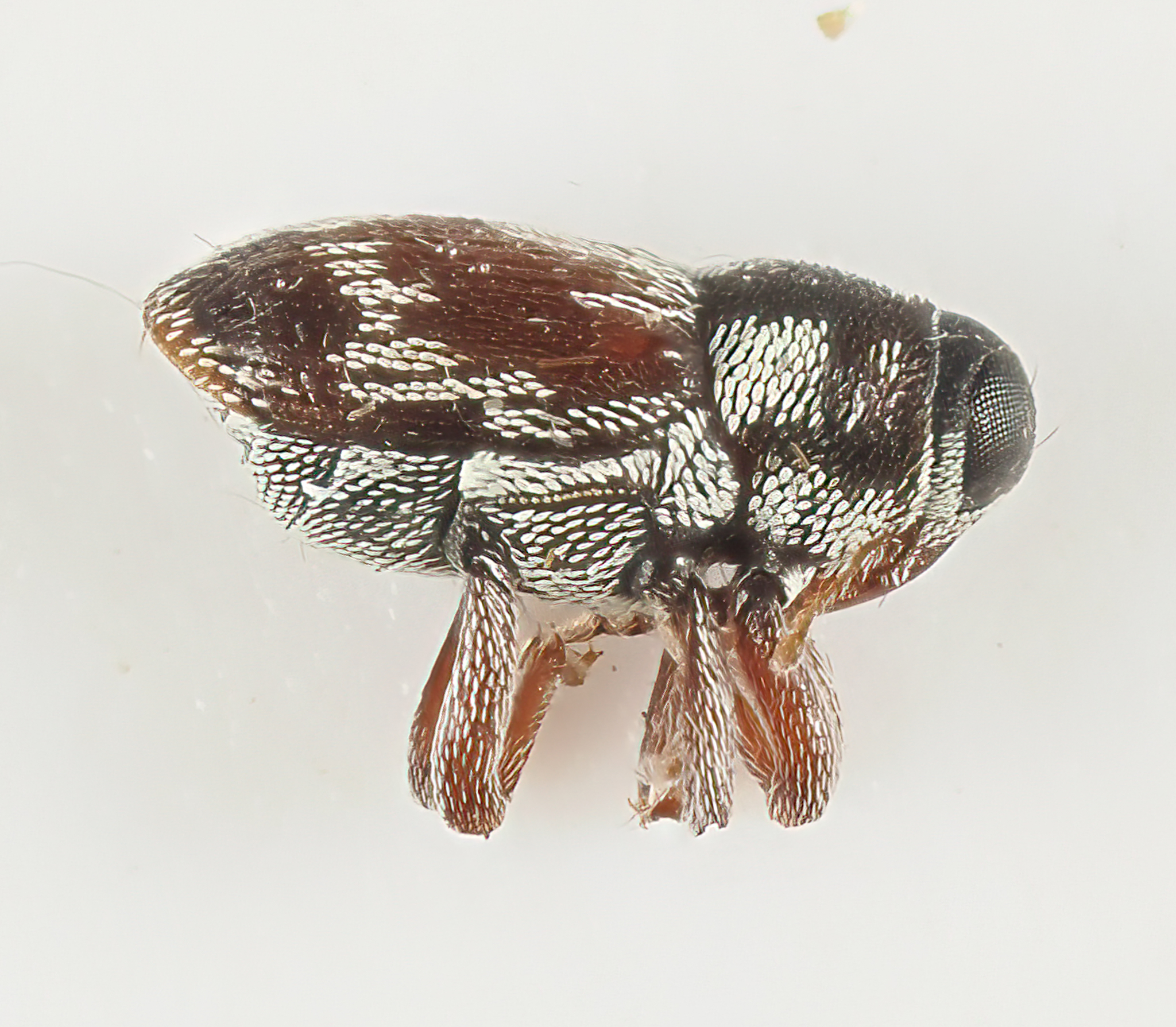

Scientific classification
- Kingdom: Animalia
- Phylum: Arthropoda
- Class: Insecta
- Order: Coleoptera
- Suborder: Polyphaga
- Infraorder: Cucujiformia
- Family: Curculionidae
- Genus: Eulechriops
- Species: E. minutus

Binomial name
- Eulechriops minutus (LeConte, 1824)

= Eulechriops minutus =

Species of beetle

Eulechriops minutus is a species of true weevil in the beetle family Curculionidae. It is found in North America.
