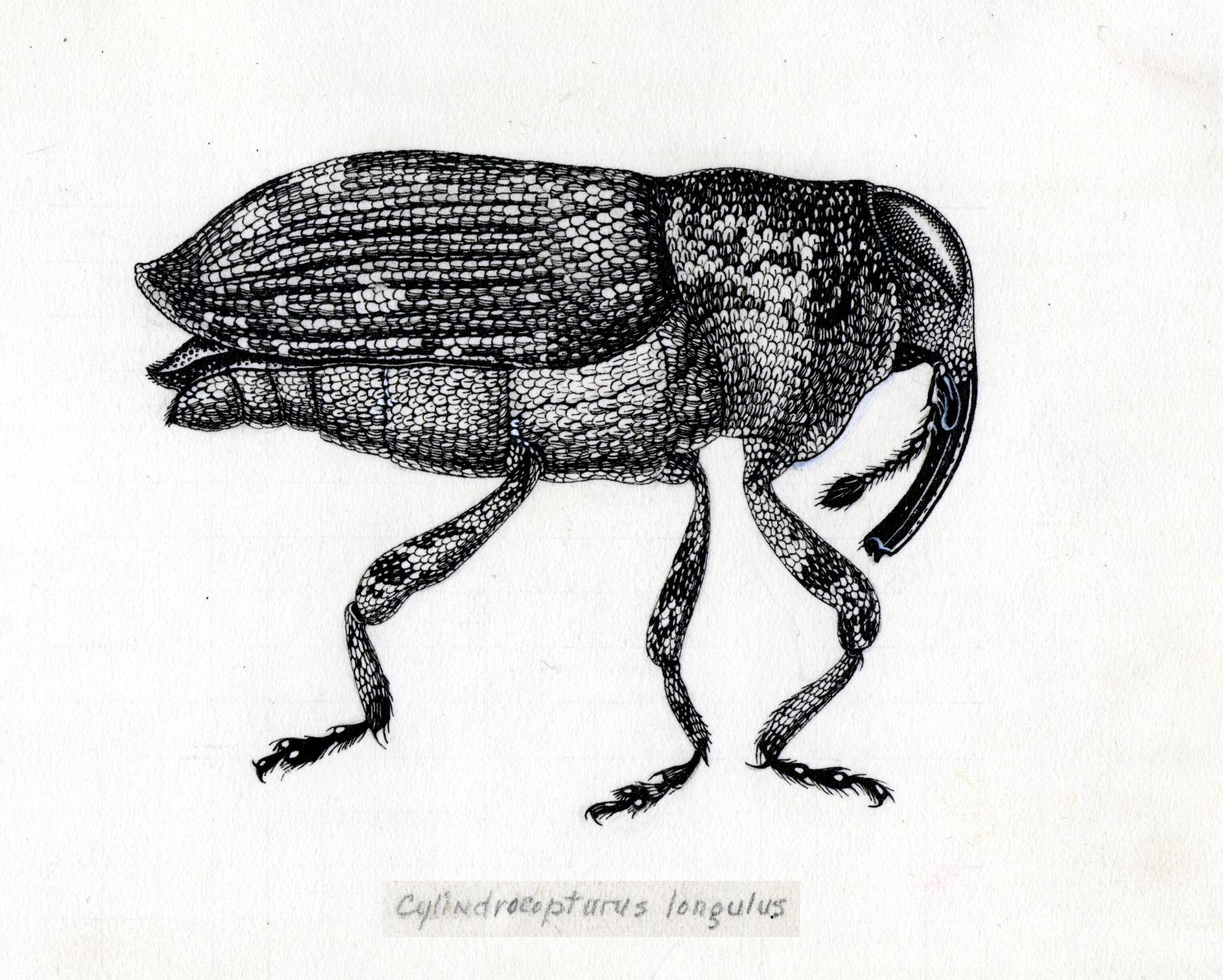
- Drawing of a Cylindrocopturus longulus

Scientific classification
- Kingdom: Animalia
- Phylum: Arthropoda
- Class: Insecta
- Order: Coleoptera
- Suborder: Polyphaga
- Infraorder: Cucujiformia
- Family: Curculionidae
- Genus: Cylindrocopturus
- Species: C. longulus

Binomial name
- Cylindrocopturus longulus (LeConte, 1876)

Synonyms
- Copturodes dispersus Casey, 1897; Copturodes mucidus Casey, 1897; Copturodes nubilatus Casey, 1897; Copturodes obscurellus Casey, 1897; Copturodes subcupreus Casey, 1897

= Cylindrocopturus longulus =

Species of beetle

Cylindrocopturus longulus is a species of true weevil in the beetle family Curculionidae. It is found in North America.
