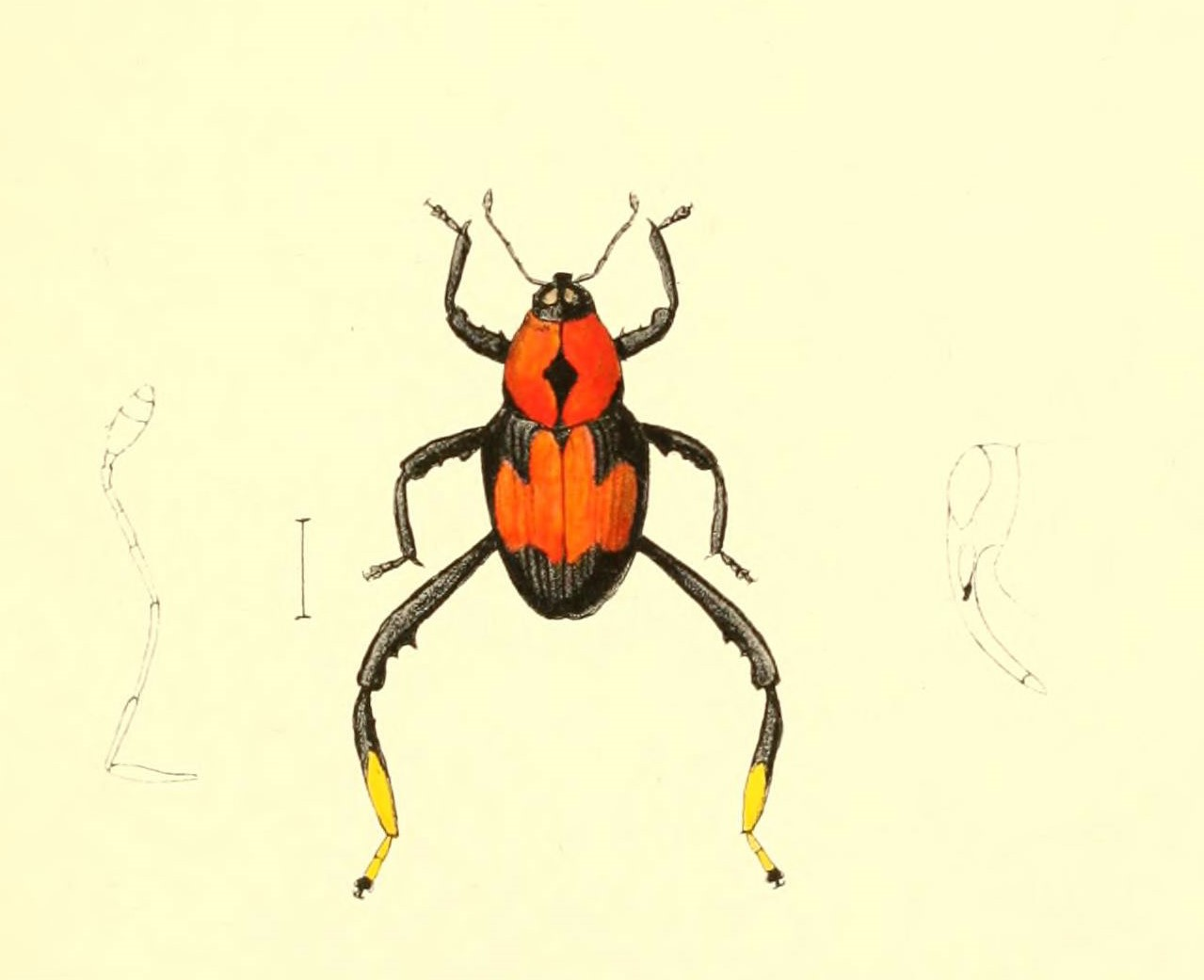
- Copturus eximius

Scientific classification
- Kingdom: Animalia
- Phylum: Arthropoda
- Class: Insecta
- Order: Coleoptera
- Suborder: Polyphaga
- Infraorder: Cucujiformia
- Family: Curculionidae
- Subfamily: Conoderinae
- Tribe: Lechriopini
- Genus: Copturus; Schönherr, 1825

Diversity
- at least 190 species

= Copturus =

Genus of beetles

Copturus is a genus of true weevils in the beetle family Curculionidae. There are more than 190 described species in Copturus.

== See also ==
- List of Copturus species
