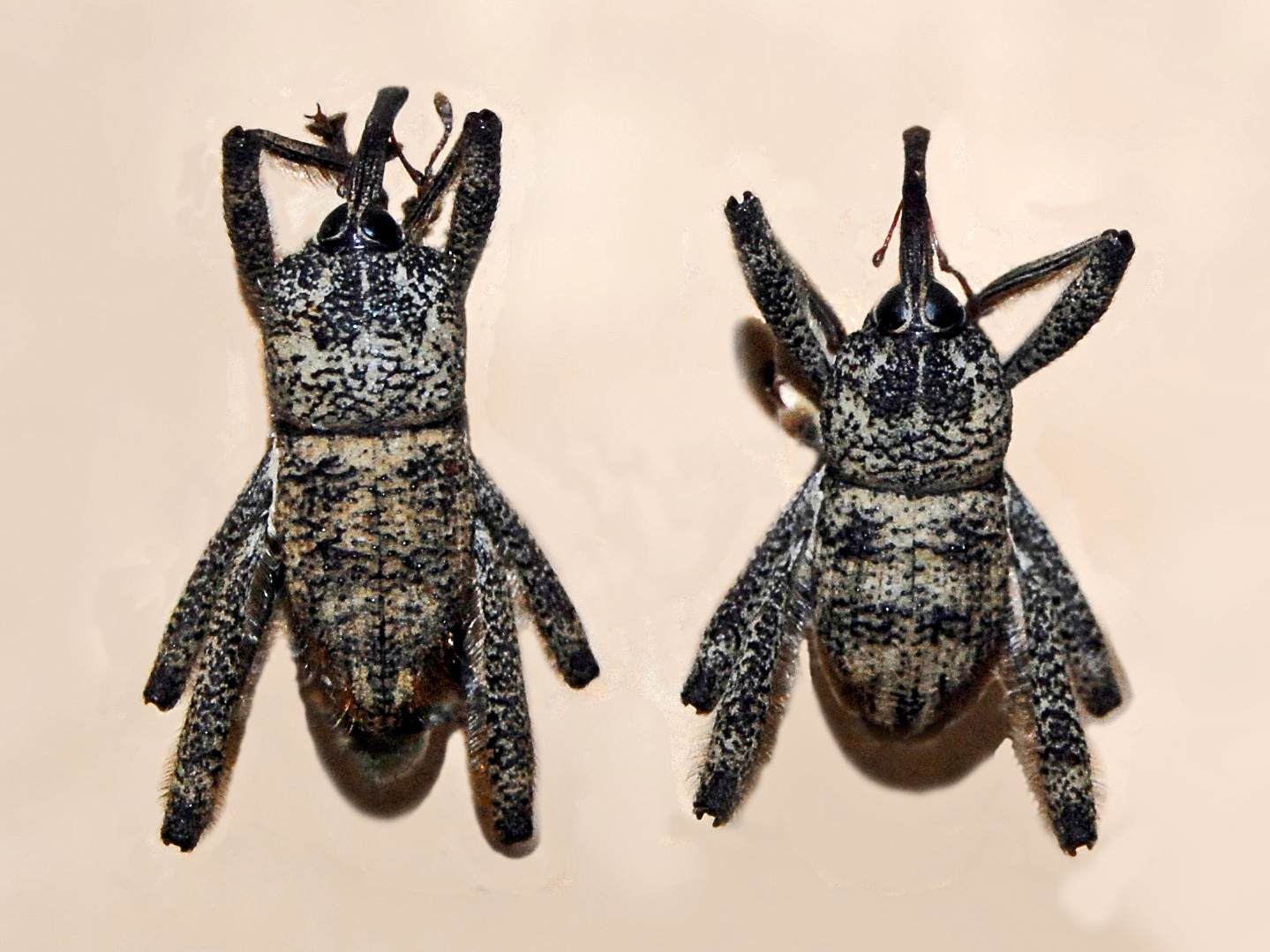
- Arachnobas sectator from Papua New Guinea

Scientific classification
- Kingdom: Animalia
- Phylum: Arthropoda
- Class: Insecta
- Order: Coleoptera
- Suborder: Polyphaga
- Infraorder: Cucujiformia
- Family: Curculionidae
- Subfamily: Cryptorhynchinae
- Tribe: Cryptorhynchini
- Subtribe: Cryptorhynchina
- Genus: Arachnobas; Boisduval, J.B.A., 1835

= Arachnobas =

Genus of beetles

Arachnobas is a genus of beetles in the true weevil family.

== Species ==
- Arachnobas alboguttatus
- Arachnobas biguttatus
- Arachnobas gazella
- Arachnobas jekeli
- Arachnobas sectator
- Arachnobas striga
