= Campyloscelini =

Scientific classification
- Kingdom: Animalia
- Phylum: Arthropoda
- Clade: Pancrustacea
- Class: Insecta
- Order: Coleoptera
- Suborder: Polyphaga
- Infraorder: Cucujiformia
- Superfamily: Curculionoidea
- Family: Curculionidae
- Subfamily: Conoderinae
- Tribe: Campyloscelini; C.J. Schönherr, 1845

Tribe of beetles

The Campyloscelini are a tribe of weevil genera in the subfamily Conoderinae, similar to the African genus Campyloscelus, described by Carl Schönherr in 1845.

== Subtribes and genera ==
Three subtribes may be included, although Alphonse Hustache also placed the "Corynemerinae" at subfamily level:

subtribe Campyloscelina Schönherr, 1845

1. Amorbaius Schönherr, 1845
2. Campyloscelus Schönherr, 1845
3. Cnemoxys Marshall, 1956
4. Histeropus Hustache, 1922
5. Lavabrenymus Hoffmann, 1966
6. Maeramorbeus Voss, 1971
7. Neocampyloscelus Hustache, 1941
8. Parepiphylax Hustache, 1934
9. Parisocordylus Faust, 1895
10. Phaulotrodes Faust, 1898
11. Seoliomerus Marshall, 1956
12. Synergatus Berg, 1898

subtribe Corynemerina Hustache, 1929

(placed as tribe Corynemerini by some authorities)

1. Corynemerus Fåhraeus, 1871
2. Epiphylax Schönherr, 1845
3. Eucorynemerus Hustache, 1927
4. Gandarius Fairmaire, 1902
5. Paracorynemerus Hustache, 1928

subtribe Phaenomerina Faust, 1898

1. Curanigus Faust, 1898
2. Decorseia Hustache, 1922
3. Haploeolus Marshall, 1956
4. Hypophylax Fairmaire, 1904
5. Phaenomerus Schönherr, 1836
6. Procuranigus Hustache, 1928
7. Scolytoproctus Faust, 1895
8. Scolytotarsus Schedl, 1937
9. Stasiastes Faust, 1895
10. Tomicoproctus Faust, 1898
