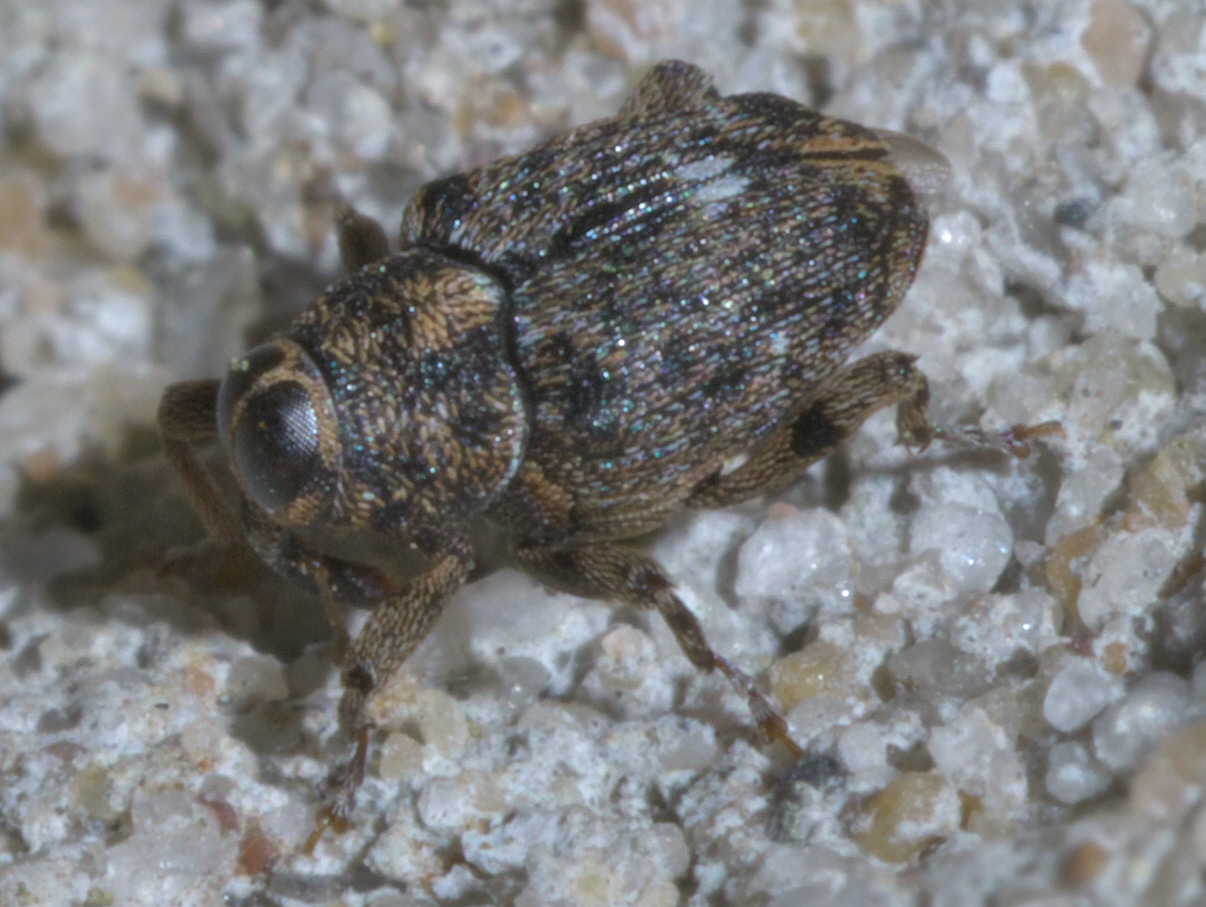
- Lechriops oculatus

Scientific classification
- Kingdom: Animalia
- Phylum: Arthropoda
- Class: Insecta
- Order: Coleoptera
- Suborder: Polyphaga
- Infraorder: Cucujiformia
- Family: Curculionidae
- Subfamily: Conoderinae
- Tribe: Lechriopini; Lacordaire, 1865

= Lechriopini =

Tribe of beetles

Lechriopini is a tribe of true weevils in the beetle family Curculionidae. There are more than 20 genera and 510 described species in Lechriopini.

== Genera ==
These 26 genera belong to the tribe Lechriopini:

- Balaninurus Heller, 1895
- Copturomimus Heller, 1895
- Copturomorpha Champion, 1906
- Copturus Schönherr, 1825
- Coturpus R.S. Anderson, 1994
- Crassocopturus Rheinheimer, 2011
- Cylindrocopturinus Sleeper, 1963
- Damurus Heller, 1895
- Eulechriops Faust, 1896
- Euzurus Champion, 1906
- Hoplocopturus Heller, 1895
- Lechriops Schönherr, 1825
- Machaerocnemis Heller, 1895
- Macrocopturus Heller, 1895
- Macrolechriops Champion, 1906
- Microzurus Heller, 1895
- Microzygops Champion, 1906
- Mnemyne Pascoe, 1880
- Mnemynurus Heller, 1895
- Paramnemyne Heller, 1895
- Paramnemynellus Hustache, 1932
- Poecilogaster Heller, 1895
- Pseudolechriops Champion, 1906
- Psomus Casey, 1892
- Rhinolechriops Hustache, 1939
- Tachylechriops Heller, 1895
- Turcopus R.S. Anderson, 1994
