= Panoptes =

Scientific classification
- Kingdom: Animalia
- Phylum: Arthropoda
- Class: Insecta
- Order: Coleoptera
- Suborder: Polyphaga
- Infraorder: Cucujiformia
- Family: Curculionidae
- Subfamily: Conoderinae
- Tribe: Coryssomerini
- Genus: Panoptes; Gerstaecker, 1860
- Species: P. notatus

Binomial name
- Panoptes notatus Gerstaecker, 1860

Genus of weevils

Panoptes is a monotypic weevil genus in the subfamily Conoderinae tribe Coryssomerini, erected by Gerstaecker in 1860. It consists of the single species Panoptes notatus.
