= Cylindrocopturinus =

Scientific classification
- Domain: Eukaryota
- Kingdom: Animalia
- Phylum: Arthropoda
- Class: Insecta
- Order: Coleoptera
- Suborder: Polyphaga
- Infraorder: Cucujiformia
- Family: Curculionidae
- Tribe: Lechriopini
- Genus: Cylindrocopturinus; Sleeper, 1963

Genus of beetles

Cylindrocopturinus is a genus of true weevils in the beetle family Curculionidae. There are at least four described species in Cylindrocopturinus.

== Species ==
These four species belong to the genus Cylindrocopturinus:

- Cylindrocopturinus catherineae Anderson, 1994^{c}
- Cylindrocopturinus hainesi Hespenheide, 1984^{c}
- Cylindrocopturinus pictus (Schaeffer, 1908)^{i c b}
- Cylindrocopturinus vanessae Anderson, 1994^{c}

Data sources: i = ITIS, c = Catalogue of Life, g = GBIF, b = Bugguide.net
