= Poecilma =

Scientific classification
- Kingdom: Animalia
- Phylum: Arthropoda
- Class: Insecta
- Order: Coleoptera
- Suborder: Polyphaga
- Infraorder: Cucujiformia
- Family: Curculionidae
- Subfamily: Conoderinae
- Genus: Poecilma; Germar, 1821

Synonyms
- Coryssomerus Schönherr, 1825; Corryssomerus Dumeril, 1827 (Missp.); Corrysomerus Bach, 1854 (Missp.); Geartamus Gistel, 1856

Genus of beetles

Poecilma is a genus of beetles belonging to the family Curculionidae, formerly referred to as Coryssomerus.

== Species ==
- Poecilma capucinus (Beck, 1817)
- Poecilma robusticolle (Pic, 1919)
- Poecilma scolopax (Faust, 1885)
