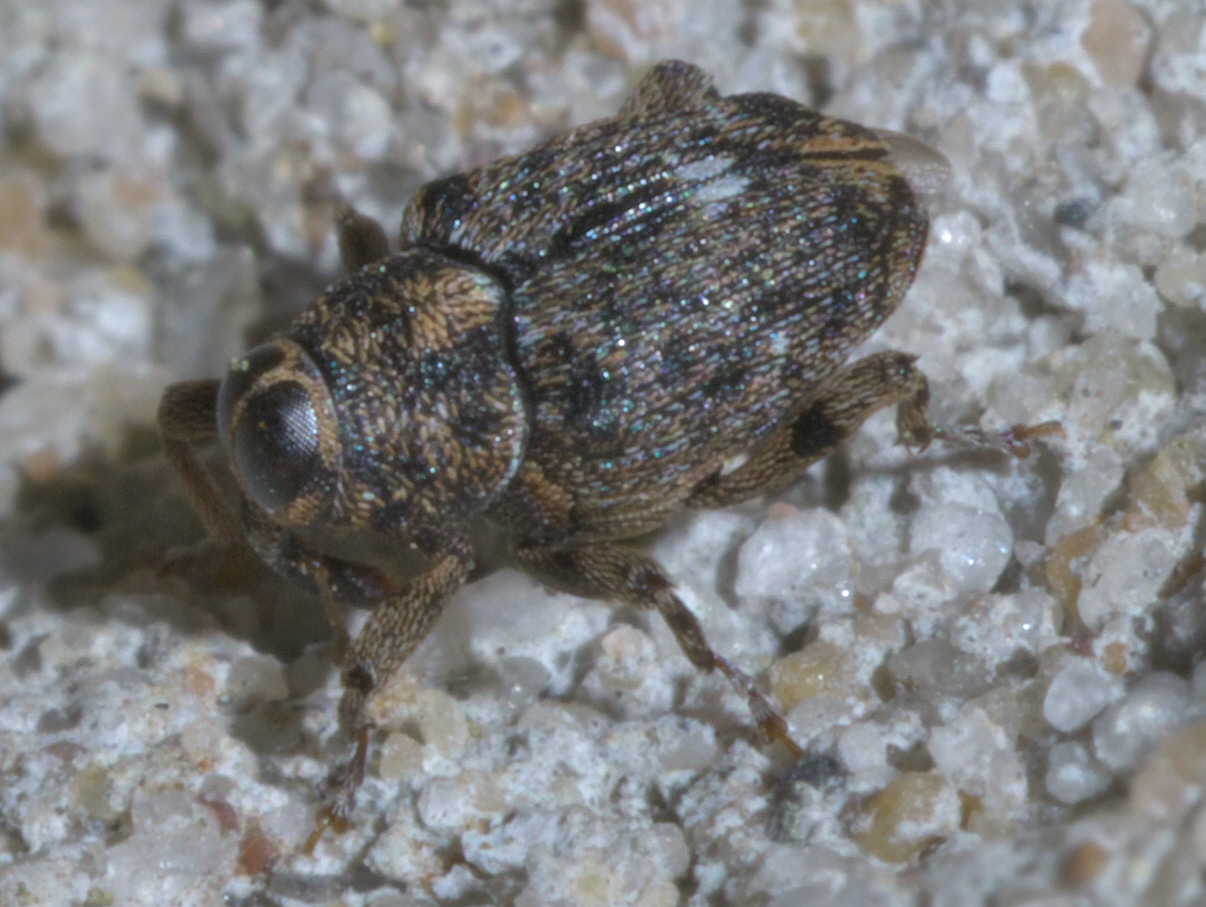
- Lechriops oculatus

Scientific classification
- Domain: Eukaryota
- Kingdom: Animalia
- Phylum: Arthropoda
- Class: Insecta
- Order: Coleoptera
- Suborder: Polyphaga
- Infraorder: Cucujiformia
- Family: Curculionidae
- Tribe: Lechriopini
- Genus: Lechriops; Schönherr, 1825

= Lechriops =

Genus of beetles

Lechriops is a genus of true weevils in the family of beetles known as Curculionidae. There are at least 90 described species in Lechriops. The genus name is masculine, contrary to some sources, following ICZN Article 30.1.4.3: "A compound genus-group name ending in -ops is to be treated as masculine, regardless of its derivation or of its treatment by its author."

== Species ==
- Lechriops albisquamis Champion, 1906^{c}
- Lechriops alboguttatus Champion, 1906^{c}
- Lechriops albopictus Heller, 1895^{c}
- Lechriops alboterminatus Champion, 1906^{c}
- Lechriops albovariegatus Champion, 1906^{c}
- Lechriops amplipennis Champion, 1906^{c}
- Lechriops analis Champion, 1906^{c}
- Lechriops apicalis Heller, 1895^{c}
- Lechriops auritus Heller, 1895^{c}
- Lechriops bicolor Champion, 1906^{c}
- Lechriops bimaculatus Hustache, 1939^{c}
- Lechriops brasiliensis Hustache, 1939^{c}
- Lechriops brevicollis Hustache, 1932^{c}
- Lechriops breviusculus Hustache, 1941^{c}
- Lechriops californicus (LeConte, 1876)^{i}
- Lechriops canescens Champion, 1906^{c}
- Lechriops carinirostris Hustache, 1932^{c}
- Lechriops centrosignatus Champion, 1906^{c}
- Lechriops chiricahuae Hespenheide, 2003^{c}
- Lechriops cinereipes Hustache, 1939^{c}
- Lechriops coarctatus Champion, 1906^{c}
- Lechriops confinis Boh. in Schoenh., 1845^{c}
- Lechriops convexicollis Heller, 1895^{c}
- Lechriops copturoides Champion, 1906^{c}
- Lechriops crux Heller, 1895^{c}
- Lechriops cylindricollis Hustache, 1939^{c}
- Lechriops cyphogaster Heller, 1895^{c}
- Lechriops decoratus Heller, 1895^{c}
- Lechriops dilutus Hustache, 1939^{c}
- Lechriops disparilis Champion, 1906^{c}
- Lechriops dorsalis Heller, 1895^{c}
- Lechriops durangoanus Champion, 1906^{c}
- Lechriops erythrorhynchus Champion, 1906^{c}
- Lechriops excavatus Champion, 1906^{c}
- Lechriops exsculptus Champion, 1906^{c}
- Lechriops extritus Champion, 1906^{c}
- Lechriops fallaciosus Hustache, 1931^{c}
- Lechriops femoralis Heller, 1895^{c}
- Lechriops festivus Champion, 1906^{c}
- Lechriops flavofasciatus Champion, 1906^{c}
- Lechriops fulvoapicalis Hustache, 1939^{c}
- Lechriops fulvus Hustache, 1939^{c}
- Lechriops griseus Sleeper, 1963^{i c}
- Lechriops guttulaalbus Heller, 1895^{c}
- Lechriops hastulifer Hustache, 1939^{c}
- Lechriops hypocritus Hustache, 1939^{c}
- Lechriops infimus Heller, 1895^{c}
- Lechriops infusus Champion, 1906^{c}
- Lechriops inornatus Heller, 1895^{c}
- Lechriops lebasi Heller, 1895^{c}
- Lechriops lineolatus Heller, 1895^{c}
- Lechriops maculiceps Champion, 1906^{c}
- Lechriops mephisto Rheinheimer, 2011^{g}
- Lechriops morosus Hustache, 1939^{c}
- Lechriops musicus Heller, 1895^{c}
- Lechriops nebulosus Heller, 1895^{c}
- Lechriops niger Heller, 1895^{c}
- Lechriops nitidicollis Champion, 1906^{c}
- Lechriops nitidiusculus Champion, 1906^{c}
- Lechriops oblongulus Champion, 1906^{c}
- Lechriops ochreoguttatus Champion, 1906^{c}
- Lechriops oculatus (Say, 1824)^{i g}
- Lechriops parilis Champion, 1906^{c}
- Lechriops paroticus Champion, 1906^{c}
- Lechriops pectoralis Heller, 1895^{c}
- Lechriops perdix Heller, 1895^{c}
- Lechriops porcatus Champion, 1906^{c}
- Lechriops psidii Marsham, 1933^{c}
- Lechriops quadripunctatus Champion, 1906^{c}
- Lechriops quinquemaculatus Hustache, 1939^{c}
- Lechriops rhomboidalis Hustache, 1939^{c}
- Lechriops rufirostris Heller, 1895^{c}
- Lechriops rufitarsis Hustache, 1939^{c}
- Lechriops rufomaculatus Champion, 1906^{c}
- Lechriops rugicollis Champion, 1906^{c}
- Lechriops sciurus Schoenherr, 1825^{c}
- Lechriops signaticollis Heller, 1895^{c}
- Lechriops similis Hustache, 1939^{c}
- Lechriops sodalis Faust, 1896^{c}
- Lechriops squamirostris Champion, 1906^{c}
- Lechriops sticticus Champion, 1906^{c}
- Lechriops striatus Hustache, 1939^{c}
- Lechriops subfasciatus (LeConte, 1876)^{i}
- Lechriops sulcifrons Heller, 1895^{c}
- Lechriops tenuelineatus Hustache, 1939^{c}
- Lechriops tibiaexcisus Rheinheimer, 2011^{g}
- Lechriops touroulti Rheinheimer, 2011^{g}
- Lechriops transversalis Hustache, 1932^{c}
- Lechriops trilineaticollis Rheinheimer, 2011^{g}
- Lechriops troglodytes Heller, 1895^{c}
- Lechriops tucumanensis Hustache, 1939^{c}
- Lechriops turtur Faust, 1896^{c}
- Lechriops variegatus Hespenheide, 2003^{c}
- Lechriops vestitus Heller, 1895^{c}
- Lechriops vicinus Champion, 1906^{c}
- Lechriops vitticollis Heller, 1895^{c}

Data sources: i = ITIS, c = Catalogue of Life, g = GBIF, b = Bugguide.net
