= Psomus =

Scientific classification
- Kingdom: Animalia
- Phylum: Arthropoda
- Class: Insecta
- Order: Coleoptera
- Suborder: Polyphaga
- Infraorder: Cucujiformia
- Family: Curculionidae
- Tribe: Lechriopini
- Genus: Psomus; Casey, 1892

Genus of weevils in the beetle family Curculionidae

Psomus is a genus of true weevils in the beetle family Curculionidae. There are about five described species in Psomus.

== Species ==
These five species belong to the genus Psomus:

- Psomus armatus (Dietz, 1891)^{i b}
- Psomus caseyi Champion, 1906^{c}
- Psomus politus Casey, 1892^{c}
- Psomus quadrinotatus Champion, 1906^{c}
- Psomus violaceus Champion, 1906^{c}

Data sources: i = ITIS, c = Catalogue of Life, g = GBIF, b = Bugguide.net
