= Eulechriops =

Scientific classification
- Domain: Eukaryota
- Kingdom: Animalia
- Phylum: Arthropoda
- Class: Insecta
- Order: Coleoptera
- Suborder: Polyphaga
- Infraorder: Cucujiformia
- Family: Curculionidae
- Tribe: Lechriopini
- Genus: Eulechriops; Faust, 1896

Genus of beetles

Eulechriops is a genus of true weevils in the beetle family Curculionidae. There are more than 80 described species in Eulechriops. The genus name is masculine, contrary to some sources, following ICZN Article 30.1.4.3: "A compound genus-group name ending in -ops is to be treated as masculine, regardless of its derivation or of its treatment by its author."

== Species ==
These 87 species belong to the genus Eulechriops:

- Eulechriops albofasciatus Champion, 1906
- Eulechriops albolineatus Champion, 1906
- Eulechriops angusticollis Champion, 1906
- Eulechriops argyrosoma Poinar & Legalov, 2014
- Eulechriops aschnae Makhan, 2009
- Eulechriops auricollis Hustache, 1932
- Eulechriops bipunctatus Hustache, 1932
- Eulechriops biseriatus Hustache, 1932
- Eulechriops boliviense Hustache, 1939
- Eulechriops boops Champion, 1906
- Eulechriops brevipes Champion, 1906
- Eulechriops carinicollis Hustache, 1931
- Eulechriops centrinoides Hustache, 1939
- Eulechriops chevrolati Hust., 1934
- Eulechriops cinerascens Champion, 1906
- Eulechriops conicicollis Champion, 1906
- Eulechriops coruscus Champion, 1906
- Eulechriops curtus Hustache, 1932
- Eulechriops curvirostris Hustache, 1939
- Eulechriops cylindricollis Champion, 1906
- Eulechriops delicatulus Hustache, 1939
- Eulechriops dorsalis Hustache, 1932
- Eulechriops ductilis Champion, 1906
- Eulechriops elongatus Champion, 1906
- Eulechriops erythroleucus Faust, 1896
- Eulechriops filirostris Champion, 1906
- Eulechriops flavitarsis Champion, 1906
- Eulechriops fulvipennis Hustache, 1932
- Eulechriops gossypii Barber
- Eulechriops gracilis Faust, 1896
- Eulechriops hoplocopturoides Hustache, 1939
- Eulechriops hovorei Hespenheide, 2007
- Eulechriops ingae Hustache, 1941
- Eulechriops ingaphilus Rheinheimer, 2014
- Eulechriops laevirostris Champion, 1906
- Eulechriops latipennis Hustache, 1939
- Eulechriops leucospilus Champion, 1906
- Eulechriops limolatus Hust., 1932
- Eulechriops lizeri Hustache, 1939
- Eulechriops longipennis Champion, 1906
- Eulechriops lugubris Champion, 1906
- Eulechriops maculicollis Champion, 1906
- Eulechriops melancholicus Champion, 1906
- Eulechriops melas Champion, 1906
- Eulechriops minutus (LeConte, 1824)
- Eulechriops minutissimus Hustache, 1932
- Eulechriops muticus Champion, 1906
- Eulechriops nanus Hustache, 1932
- Eulechriops niger Hustache, 1932
- Eulechriops nigrolineatus Champion, 1906
- Eulechriops nitidus Champion, 1906
- Eulechriops obscurus Hustache, 1939
- Eulechriops ochraceus Champion, 1906
- Eulechriops ornatus Champion, 1906
- Eulechriops parallelus Hustache, 1932
- Eulechriops parvulus Hustache, 1932
- Eulechriops perplexus Faust, 1896
- Eulechriops perpusillus Champion, 1906
- Eulechriops pictus Schaeffer
- Eulechriops plagiatus Champion, 1906
- Eulechriops puncticollis Hustache, 1939
- Eulechriops pusillus Champion, 1906
- Eulechriops pygmaeus Champion, 1906
- Eulechriops rubi Hespenheide, 2005
- Eulechriops rubricus Hustache, 1939
- Eulechriops rufipes Hustache, 1932
- Eulechriops rufirostris Hustache, 1932
- Eulechriops rufulus Hustache, 1939
- Eulechriops scutulatus Champion, 1906
- Eulechriops septemnotatus Champion, 1906
- Eulechriops seriatus Champion, 1906
- Eulechriops sexnotatus Champion, 1906
- Eulechriops sibinioides Champion, 1906
- Eulechriops soesilae Makhan, 2009
- Eulechriops squamulatus Champion, 1906
- Eulechriops subbifasciatus Hustache, 1932
- Eulechriops subcylindricus Hustache, 1939
- Eulechriops suturalis Hustache, 1932
- Eulechriops t-album Hustache, 1939
- Eulechriops tenuirostris Champion, 1906
- Eulechriops tricolor Hustache, 1939
- Eulechriops trifasciatus Faust, 1896
- Eulechriops tuberculifer Champion, 1906
- Eulechriops variegatus Hustache, 1932
- Eulechriops vinaceus Hustache, 1939
