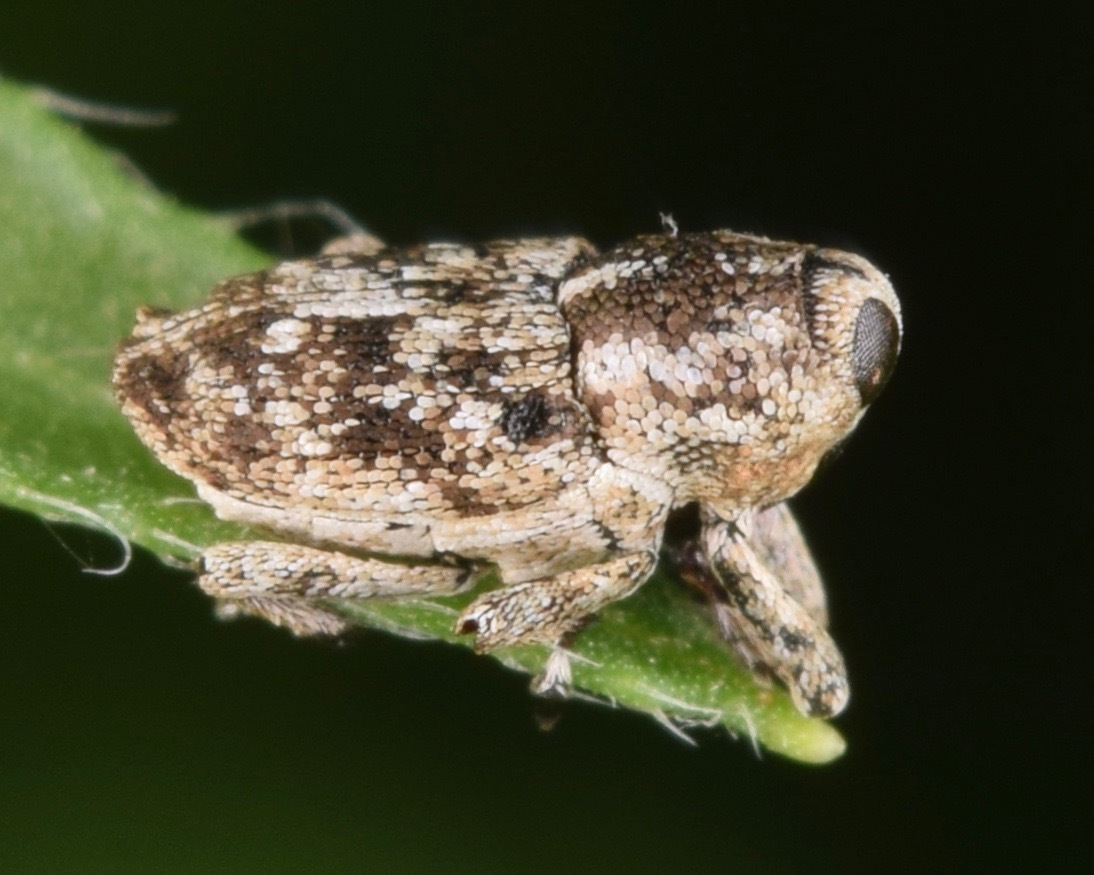
- Cylindrocopturus nanulus

Scientific classification
- Kingdom: Animalia
- Phylum: Arthropoda
- Class: Insecta
- Order: Coleoptera
- Suborder: Polyphaga
- Infraorder: Cucujiformia
- Family: Curculionidae
- Subfamily: Conoderinae
- Tribe: Zygopini; Lacordaire, 1865

= Zygopini =

Tribe of beetles

Zygopini is a tribe of twig and stem weevils in the beetle family Curculionidae. There are more than 20 genera and at least 250 described species in Zygopini. 83 species are currently known from the 11 genera occurring north of South America, 8 genera occur exclusively in South America, and 2 are recorded from Africa.

== Genera ==
These 22 genera belong to the tribe Zygopini:

- Acopturus Heller, 1895
- Arachnomorpha Champion, 1906
- Archocopturus Heller, 1895
- Colpothorax Desbrochers, 1890
- Copturosomus Heller, 1895
- Cylindrocopturus Heller, 1895
- †Geratozygops Davis and Engel, 2006
- Helleriella Champion, 1906
- Hemicolpus Heller, 1895
- Hypoplagius Desbrochers, 1891
- Isocopturus Hustache, 1931
- Larides Champion, 1906
- Lissoderes Champion, 1906
- Macrotimorus Heller, 1895
- Parazygops Desbrochers, 1890
- Peltophorus Schoenherr, 1845
- Phileas Champion, 1906
- Philenis Champion, 1906
- Timorus Schoenherr, 1838
- Xeniella Hustache, 1931
- Zygops Schoenherr, 1825
- Zygopsella Champion, 1906
