= Acoptus =

Scientific classification
- Kingdom: Animalia
- Phylum: Arthropoda
- Clade: Pancrustacea
- Class: Insecta
- Order: Coleoptera
- Suborder: Polyphaga
- Infraorder: Cucujiformia
- Family: Curculionidae
- Genus: Acoptus
- Species: A. suturalis

Binomial name
- Acoptus suturalis LeConte, 1876

Genus of beetles

Acoptus is a genus of true weevils in the family of beetles known as Curculionidae. There is one described species in Acoptus, A. suturalis, found in the northeastern United States and southeastern Canada. It can commonly be found near beaver dams.
