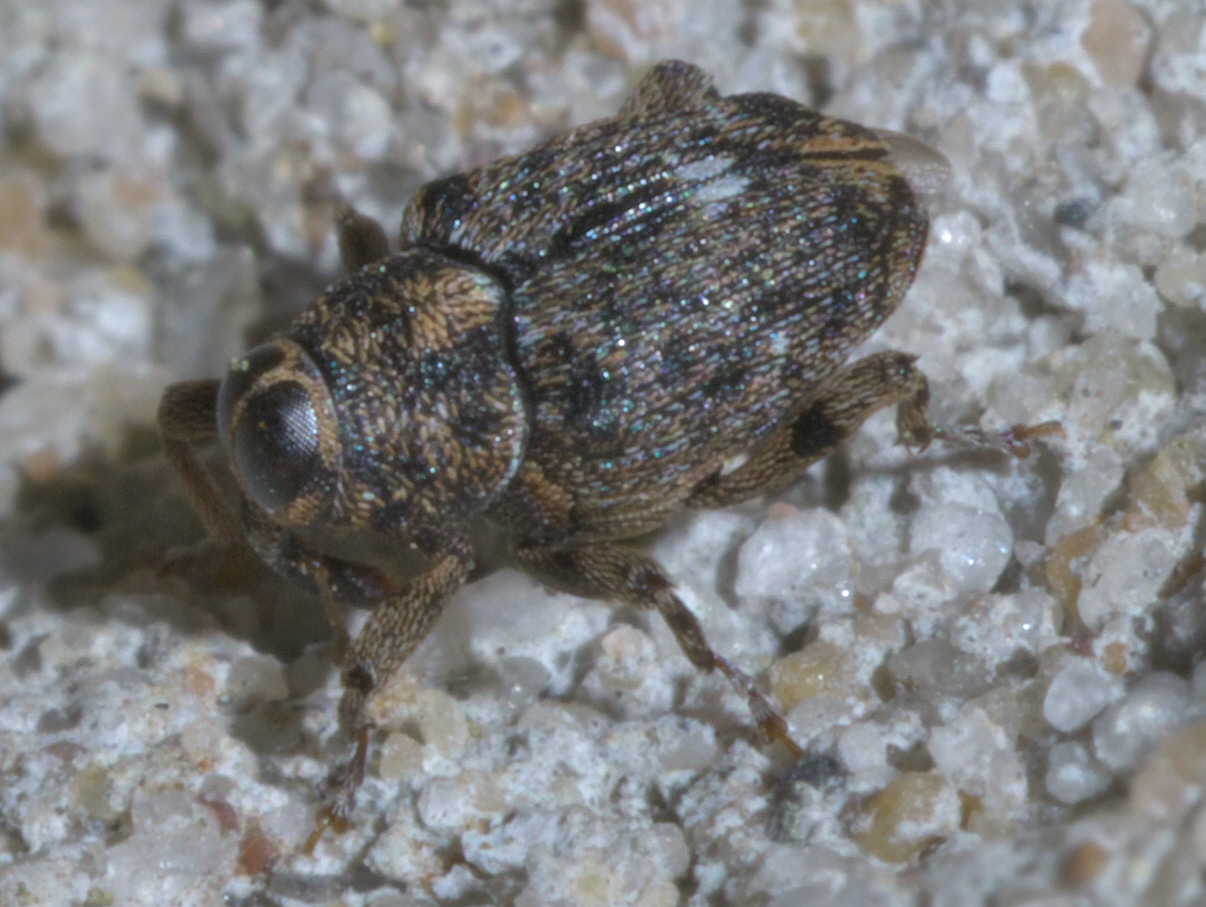
- Lechriops oculatus

Scientific classification
- Kingdom: Animalia
- Phylum: Arthropoda
- Class: Insecta
- Order: Coleoptera
- Suborder: Polyphaga
- Infraorder: Cucujiformia
- Family: Curculionidae
- Subfamily: Conoderinae; Schoenherr, 1833

Tribes
- Arachnopodini Lacordaire, 1865; Campyloscelini Schönherr, 1845; Conoderini Schönherr, 1833; Coryssomerini Thomson, 1859; Coryssopodini Lacordaire, 1865; Lechriopini Lacordaire, 1865; Lobotrachelini Lacordaire, 1865; Mecopini Lacordaire, 1865; Menemachini Lacordaire, 1865; Othippiini Morimoto, 1962; Peloropodini Hustache, 1932; Piazurini Lacordaire, 1865; Sphadasmini Lacordaire, 1865; Trichodocerini Champion, 1906; Zygopini Lacordaire, 1865

Diversity
- at least 210 genera

= Conoderinae =

Subfamily of beetles

Conoderinae is a subfamily of true weevils in the beetle family Curculionidae. There are more than 210 genera in 15 tribes, and about 2,400 described species in Conoderinae, with a world-wide distribution.

Thirty-nine extant genera of Conoderinae are known to occur in North America, Central America, and the Caribbean and are reviewed based on external morphology.

== See also ==
- List of Conoderinae genera
