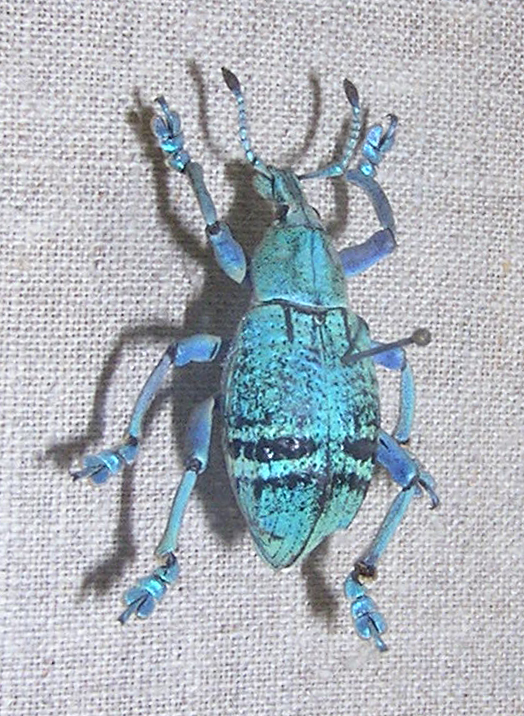
- Eupholus azureus

Scientific classification
- Domain: Eukaryota
- Kingdom: Animalia
- Phylum: Arthropoda
- Class: Insecta
- Order: Coleoptera
- Suborder: Polyphaga
- Infraorder: Cucujiformia
- Family: Curculionidae
- Subfamily: Entiminae
- Tribe: Eupholini; Günther, 1943

Genera
- See text

= Eupholini =

Tribe of beetles

Eupholini is a weevil tribe in the subfamily Entiminae.

== Genera ==
- Celebia
- Episomellus
- Eupholus
- Gymnopholus
- Monoscapha
- Penthoscapha
- Rhinoscapha
