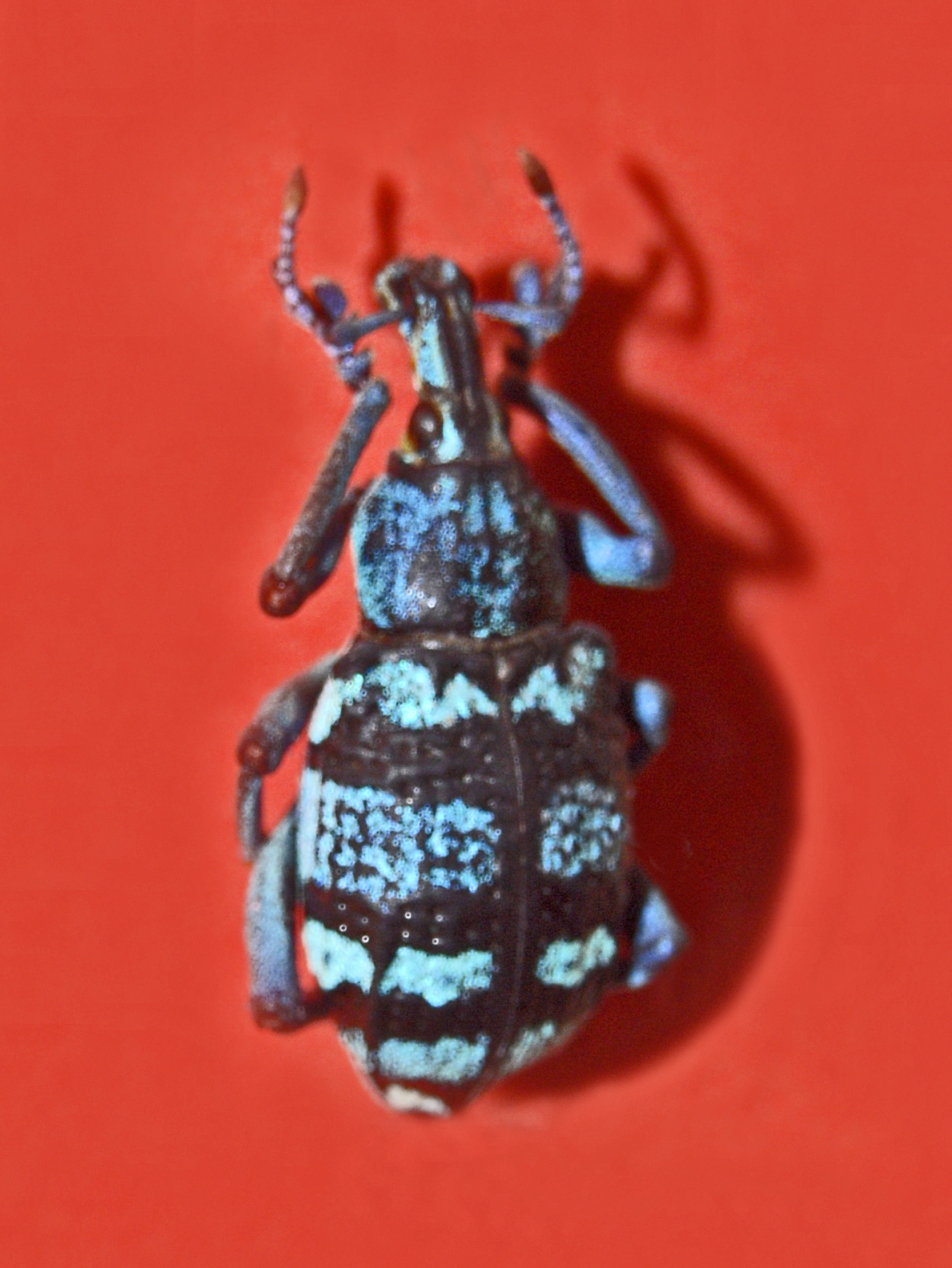
- Museum specimen of Eupholus tupinierii

Scientific classification
- Kingdom: Animalia
- Phylum: Arthropoda
- Clade: Pancrustacea
- Class: Insecta
- Order: Coleoptera
- Suborder: Polyphaga
- Infraorder: Cucujiformia
- Family: Curculionidae
- Genus: Eupholus
- Species: E. tupinierii

Binomial name
- Eupholus tupinierii Guérin-Méneville, 1838

= Eupholus tupinierii =

Species of beetle

Eupholus tupinierii is a species of beetle belonging to the family Curculionidae.

== Description ==
Eupholus tupinieriii can reach a length of 22–24 millimetres (0.87–0.94 in) and a width of 8–9 millimetres (0.31–0.35 in). It is close to Eupholus schoenherri. This species is usually bright blue-green, with three large transversal black bands across the elytra. The blue-green colour derives from very small scales.

== Distribution ==
This species can be found in lowland rainforests of Papua New Guinea.
