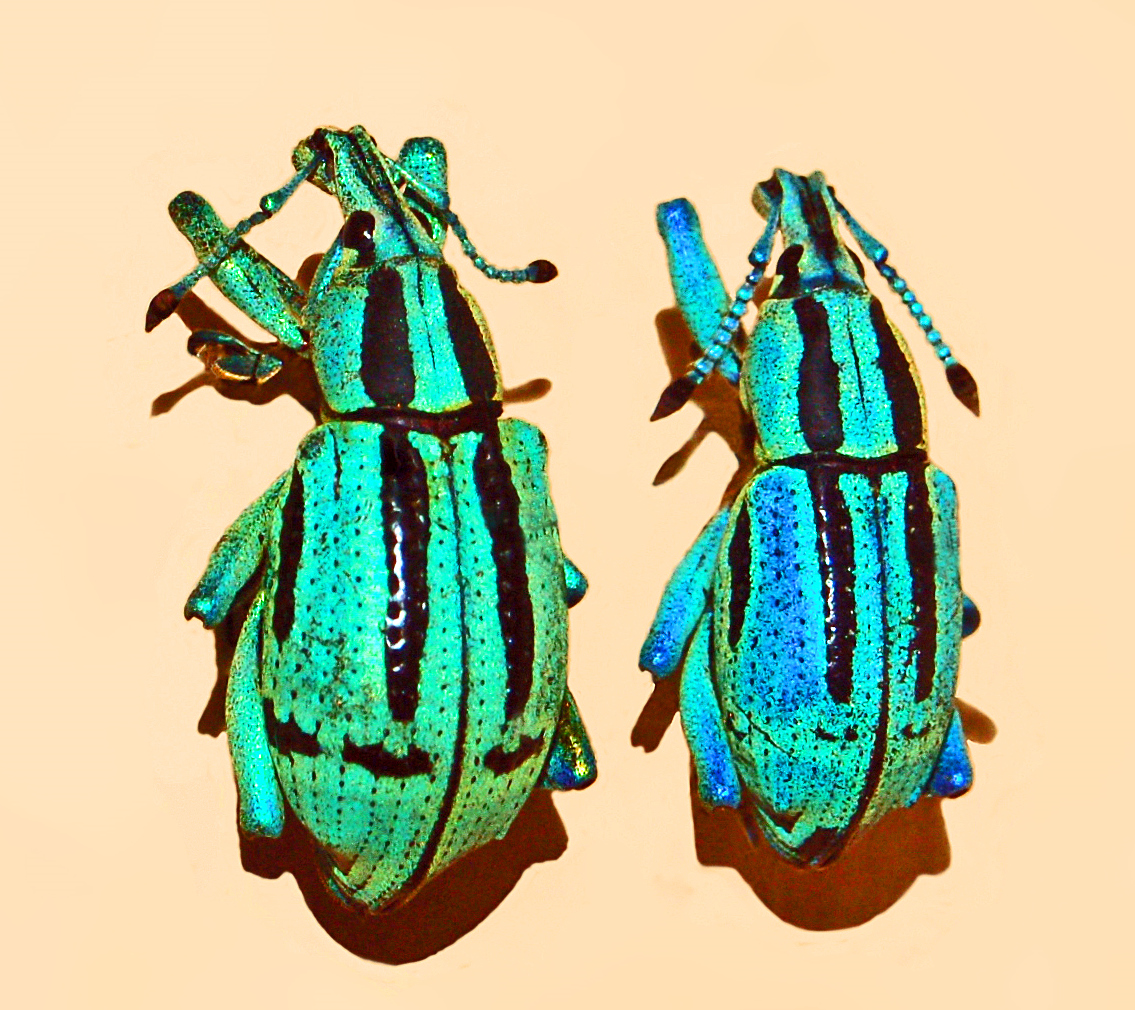
- Eupholus bennetti from New Guinea

Scientific classification
- Kingdom: Animalia
- Phylum: Arthropoda
- Clade: Pancrustacea
- Class: Insecta
- Order: Coleoptera
- Suborder: Polyphaga
- Infraorder: Cucujiformia
- Superfamily: Curculionoidea
- Family: Curculionidae
- Genus: Eupholus
- Species: E. bennetti

Binomial name
- Eupholus bennetti (Gestro & D'Albertis, 1876)

Synonyms
- Eupholus bennetti v. apicalis; Eupholus bennetti v. bicolor

= Eupholus bennetti =

Species of beetle

Eupholus bennetti is a species of beetle belonging to the family Curculionidae.

== Description ==
Eupholus bennetti can reach a length of about 22–32 millimetres (0.87–1.26 in). This quite variable species is usually blue or green, with two longitudinal black bands along the pronotum and the elytra. The blue-green colour derives from very small scales. The top of the antennae is black.

== Distribution ==
This species can be found in lowland rainforests of Papua New Guinea.

== Etymology ==
The scientific name commemorates the Australian naturalist George Bennett.
