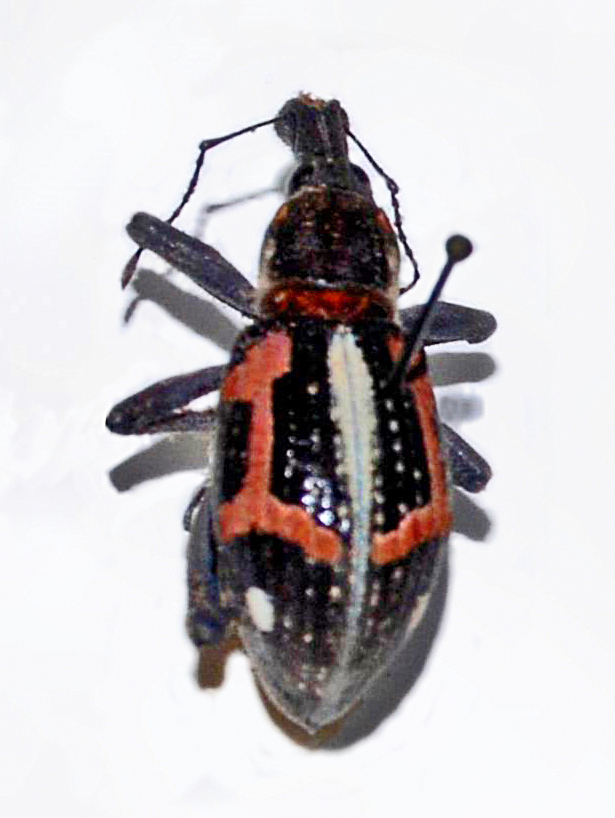
- Rhinoscapha maclayi. Museum specimen

Scientific classification
- Kingdom: Animalia
- Phylum: Arthropoda
- Clade: Pancrustacea
- Class: Insecta
- Order: Coleoptera
- Suborder: Polyphaga
- Infraorder: Cucujiformia
- Superfamily: Curculionoidea
- Family: Curculionidae
- Genus: Rhinoscapha
- Species: R. maclayi

Binomial name
- Rhinoscapha maclayi MacLeay, W. J., 1885

= Rhinoscapha maclayi =

Species of beetle

Rhinoscapha maclayi is a species of beetle in the true weevil family.

== Description ==
Rhinoscapha maclayi can reach a length of about 30 millimetres (1.2 in).

Black, nitid; head densely punctured in front, lightly behind, covered with a thin ashen pubescence and furnished with a number of strong hairs about the mouth. The extremity of the snout as broad as the head. Thorax scarcely longer than broad, broader at the base than the apex, and also broader than the head, very regularly marked, and with a depression on the anterior part of the median line. A broad depressed space on the side and under surface of the apex of the thorax is densely covered with reddish golden scales, and on each side from the middle to the base there is a broad vitta of the same. The elytra are convex, broader than the thorax, with a prominent humeral callus, and pointed at the apex; on each elytron are nine rows of large oblong punctures, the intervals scarcely raised; the extreme apex is mucronate. A sutural vitta including the scutellum, a broadish fascia behind the shoulder and not reaching the suture, and a narrower rather curved fascia behind the middle and extending to the suture, are densely clothed with golden scales. The metasternum is similarly clothed. The legs are sparingly punctured, each puncture with a short seta.

== Distribution ==
This species occurs in New Guinea, in the Maclay Coast, which Nicholas Miklouho-Maclay named.
