= Gymnopholus lichenifer =

Lichen weevil

Conservation status
- Endangered (IUCN 3.1)

Scientific classification
- Kingdom: Animalia
- Phylum: Arthropoda
- Clade: Pancrustacea
- Class: Insecta
- Order: Coleoptera
- Suborder: Polyphaga
- Infraorder: Cucujiformia
- Family: Curculionidae
- Genus: Gymnopholus
- Species: G. lichenifer

Binomial name
- Gymnopholus lichenifer Gressitt, 1966

Species of beetle

Gymnopholus lichenifer is a species of beetle in the weevil family, Curculionidae. It is endemic to Papua New Guinea, where it is known only from the vicinity of Mount Kaindi at elevations above 1700 meters. It is known by the common name lichen weevil.
