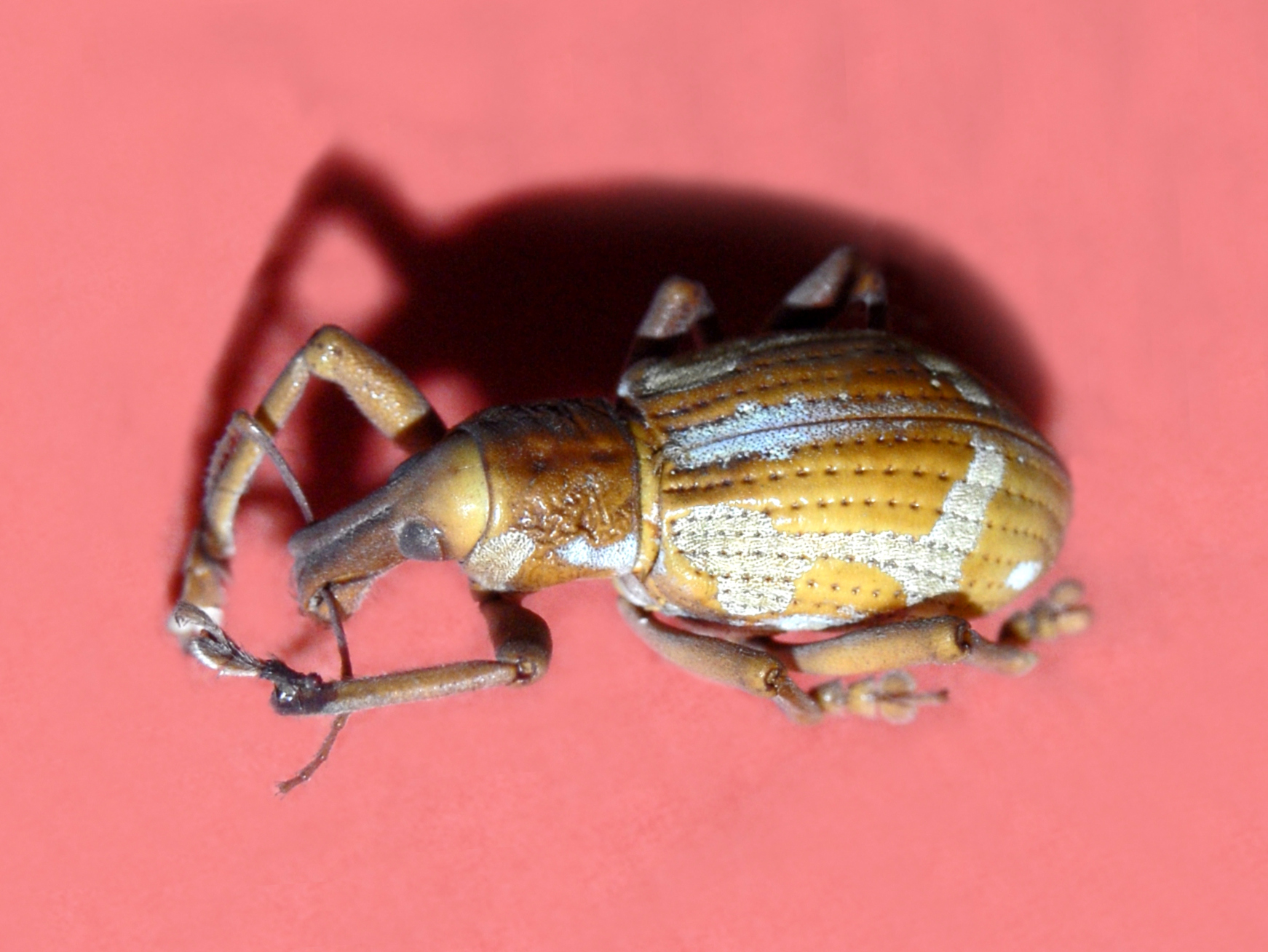
- Museum specimen of Rhinoscapha tricolor

Scientific classification
- Kingdom: Animalia
- Phylum: Arthropoda
- Class: Insecta
- Order: Coleoptera
- Suborder: Polyphaga
- Infraorder: Cucujiformia
- Family: Curculionidae
- Genus: Rhinoscapha
- Species: R. tricolor

Binomial name
- Rhinoscapha tricolor Faust, J., 1890

= Rhinoscapha tricolor =

Species of beetle

Rhinoscapha tricolor is a species of beetle in the true weevil family. It occurs in Papua New Guinea.
