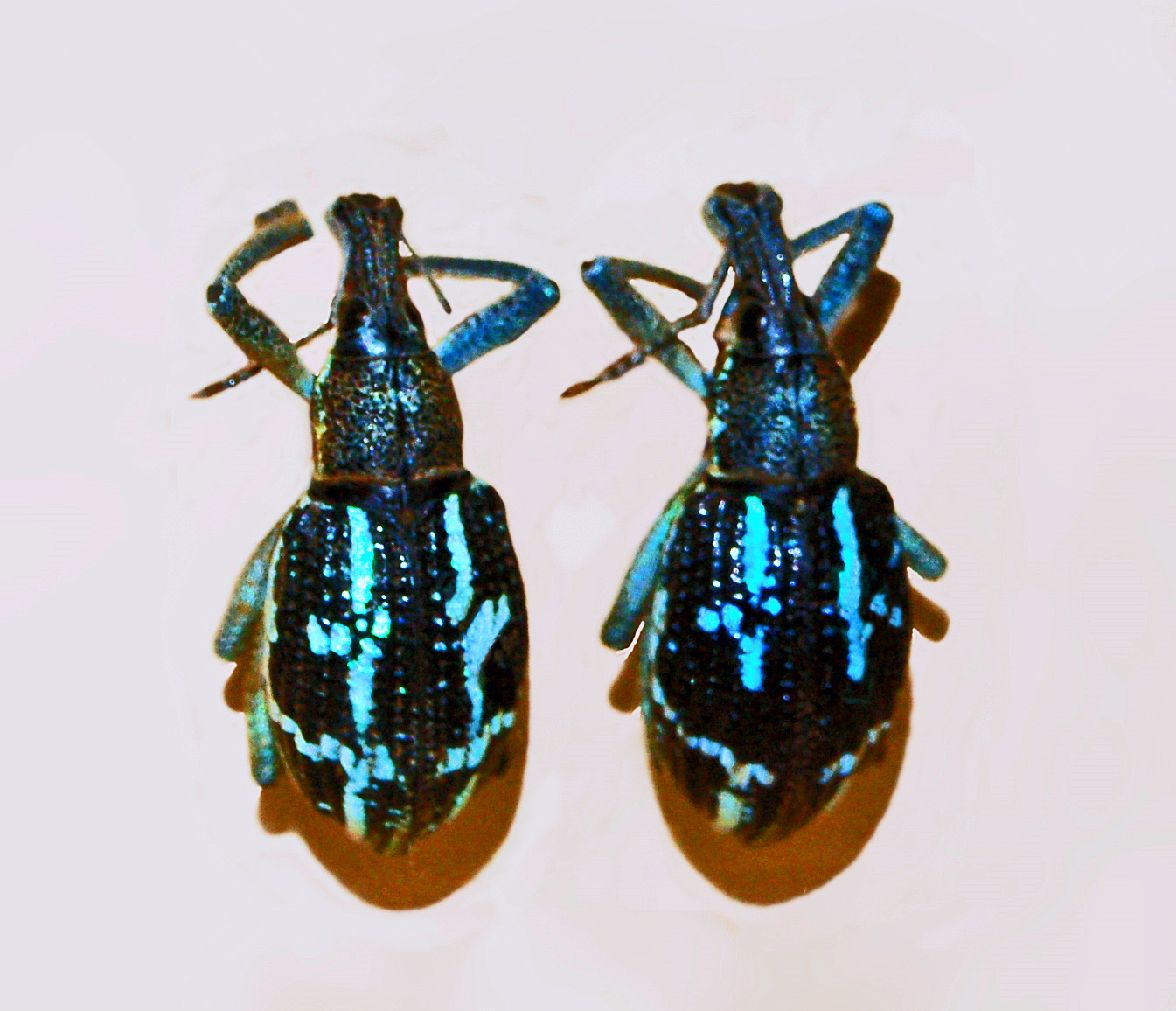
- Rhinoscapha insignis from New Guinea

Scientific classification
- Kingdom: Animalia
- Phylum: Arthropoda
- Clade: Pancrustacea
- Class: Insecta
- Order: Coleoptera
- Suborder: Polyphaga
- Infraorder: Cucujiformia
- Family: Curculionidae
- Genus: Rhinoscapha
- Species: R. insignis

Binomial name
- Rhinoscapha insignis Guérin-Méneville, F.E., 1841

= Rhinoscapha insignis =

Species of beetle

Rhinoscapha insignis is a species of beetle in the true weevil family. It occurs in Papua New Guinea.
