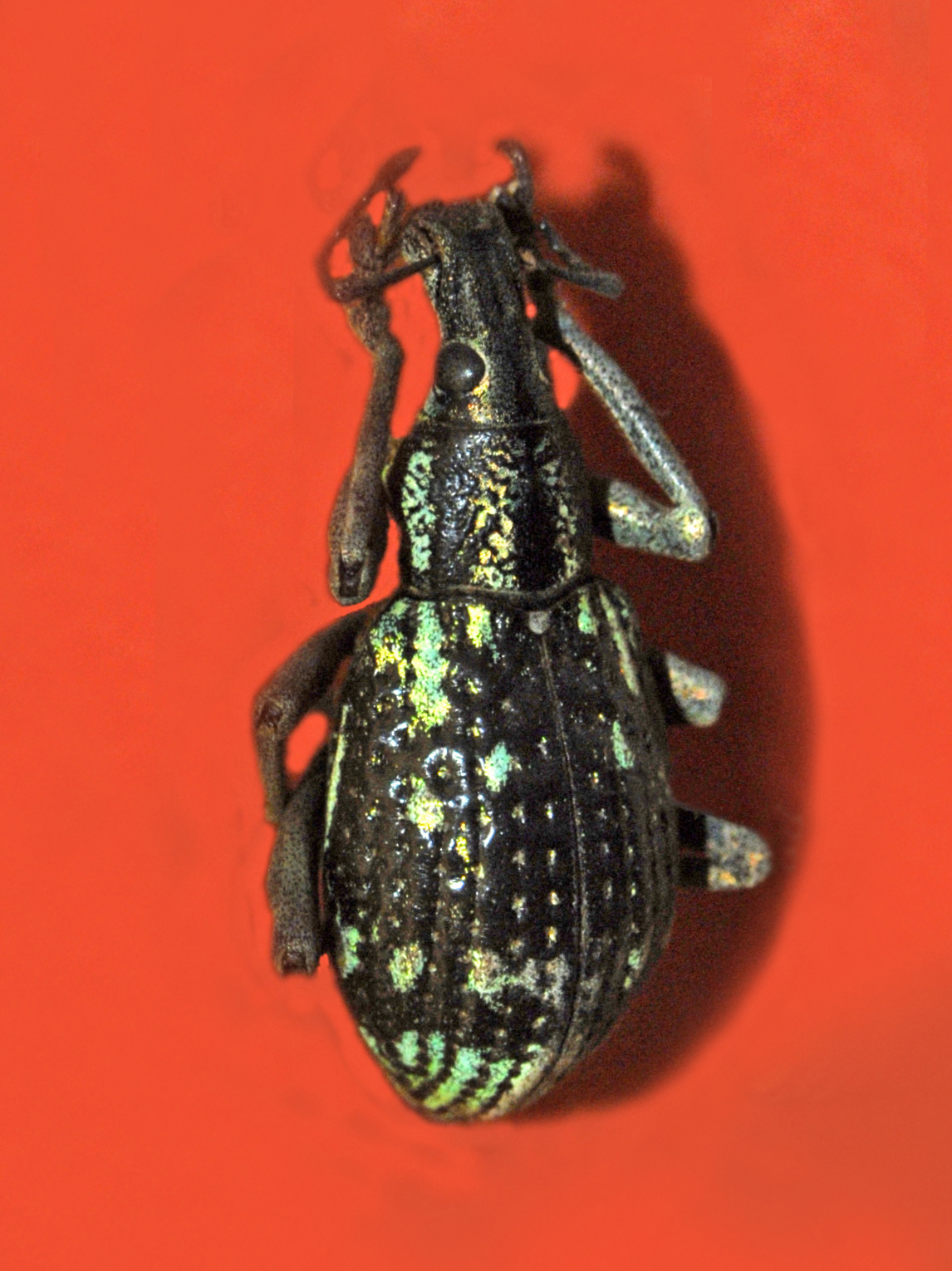
- Museum specimen of Rhinoscapha hasterti

Scientific classification
- Kingdom: Animalia
- Phylum: Arthropoda
- Class: Insecta
- Order: Coleoptera
- Suborder: Polyphaga
- Infraorder: Cucujiformia
- Family: Curculionidae
- Genus: Rhinoscapha
- Species: R. hasterti

Binomial name
- Rhinoscapha hasterti Heller, 1935

= Rhinoscapha hasterti =

Species of beetle

Rhinoscapha hasterti is a species of beetle in the true weevil family. It occurs in Papua New Guinea.
