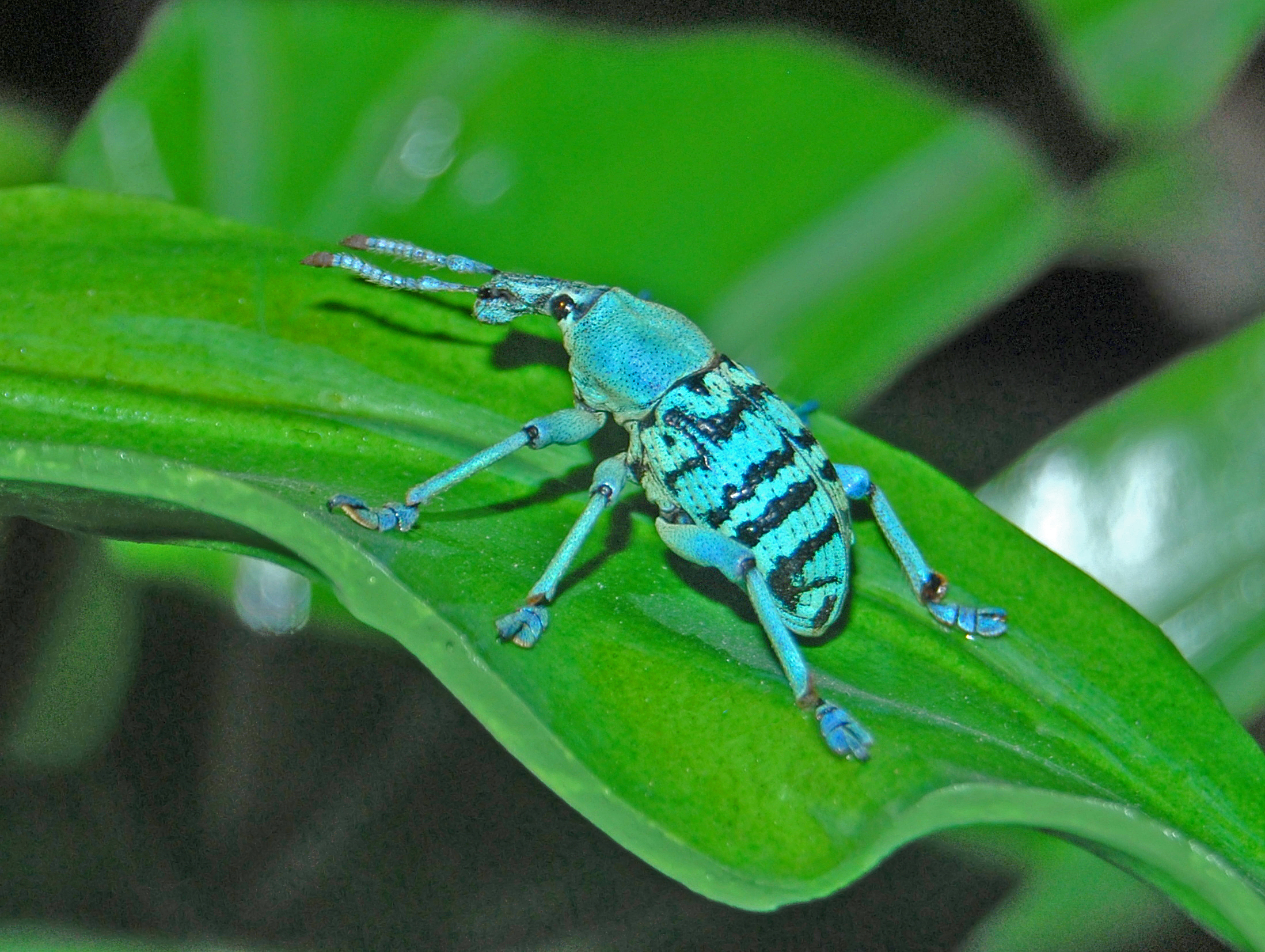
- Eupholus nickerli cyanescens, on display at the Museo Civico di Storia Naturale di Milano

Scientific classification
- Domain: Eukaryota
- Kingdom: Animalia
- Phylum: Arthropoda
- Class: Insecta
- Order: Coleoptera
- Suborder: Polyphaga
- Infraorder: Cucujiformia
- Family: Curculionidae
- Genus: Eupholus
- Species: E. nickerli

Binomial name
- Eupholus nickerli Heller, 1913

= Eupholus nickerli =

Species of insect

Eupholus nickerli is a species of beetle belonging to the family Curculionidae.

== Subspecies ==
Subspecies include:

- Eupholus-nickerli cyanescens
- Eupholus-nickerli anthracina

== Distribution ==
This species can be found in Papua New Guinea.

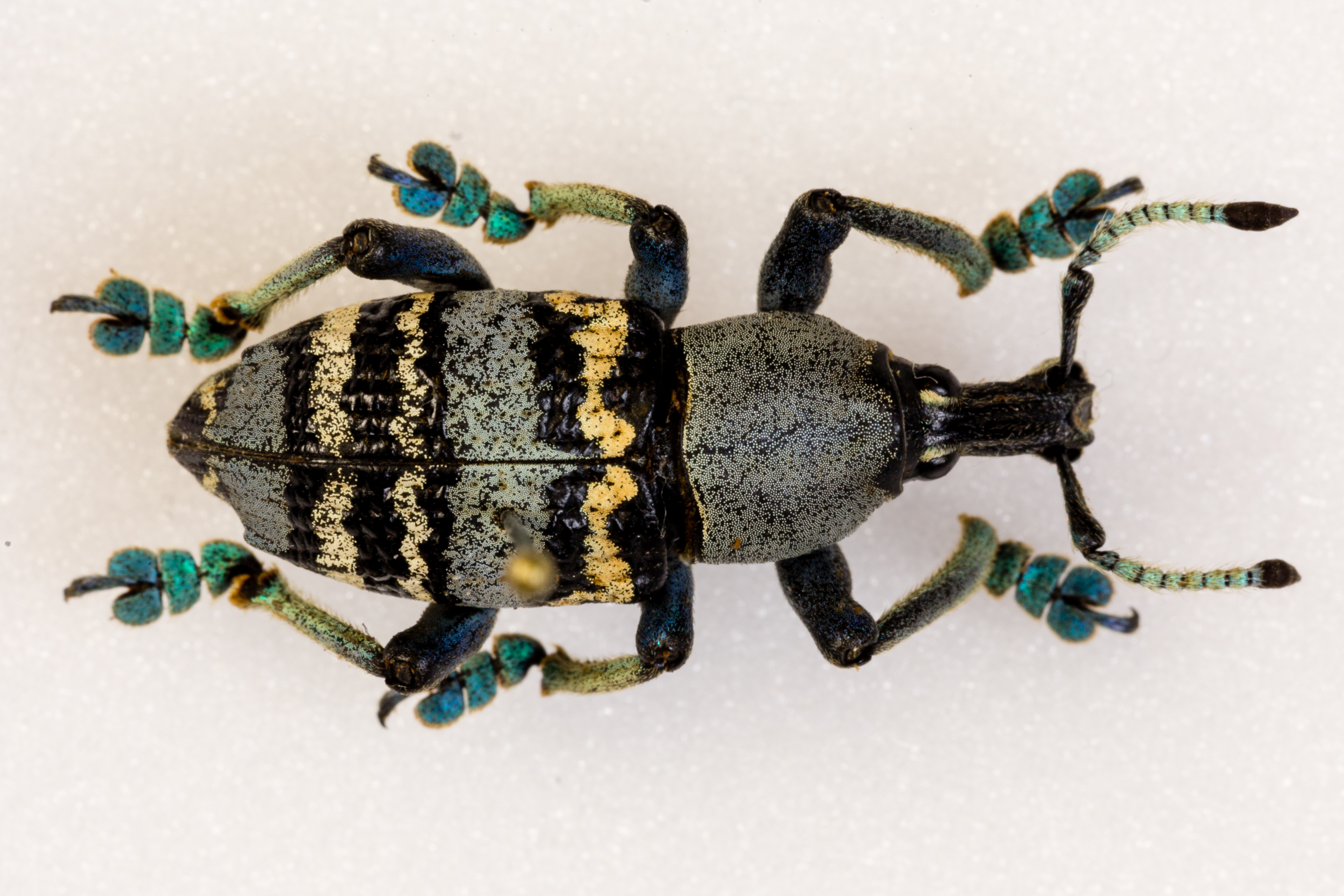
Eupholus-nickerli anthracina

== Habitat ==
These beetles mainly inhabit warm forest.

== Description ==
Eupholus nickerli can reach a length of about 18–32 millimetres (0.71–1.26 in). In the subspecies Eupholus-nickerli cyanescens the basic colour of these quite variable beetles is metallic blue, with some transversal irregular black bands along the elytra. The thorax is uniformly blue. In the subspecies Eupholus-nickerli anthracina the basic color is greygreyish, with transversal black and yellowish bands . These structural colours derive from very small, flat scales and possibly serve to warn predators of their toxicity. The top of rostrum and the end of the antennae are black.
