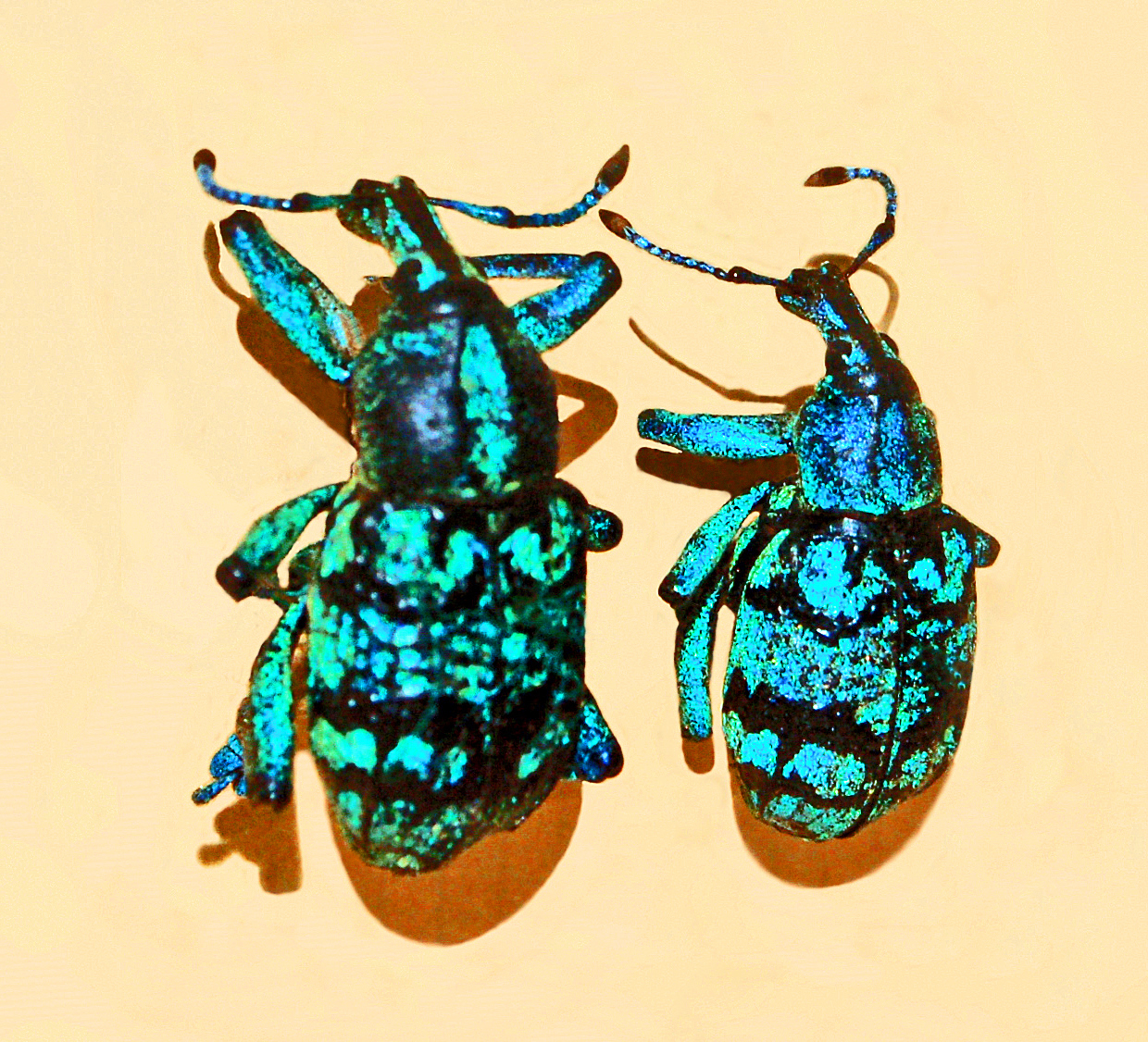
- Eupholus chevrolati from Aru Islands (Indonesia)

Scientific classification
- Kingdom: Animalia
- Phylum: Arthropoda
- Clade: Pancrustacea
- Class: Insecta
- Order: Coleoptera
- Suborder: Polyphaga
- Infraorder: Cucujiformia
- Superfamily: Curculionoidea
- Family: Curculionidae
- Genus: Eupholus
- Species: E. chevrolati

Binomial name
- Eupholus chevrolati Guérin-Méneville, 1830

= Eupholus chevrolati =

Species of beetle

Eupholus chevrolati is a species of beetle belonging to the family Curculionidae.

== Description ==
Eupholus chevrolati can reach a length of about 25 millimetres (0.98 in). The basic colour of this quite variable species is metallic blue-green, with some transversal irregular black bands along the elytra. The blue-green colour derives from very small scales. The top of rostrum and the end of the antennae are black.

== Distribution ==
This species can be found in Aru Islands (Indonesia)

== Etymology ==
The name honours the French entomologist Louis Alexandre Auguste Chevrolat
