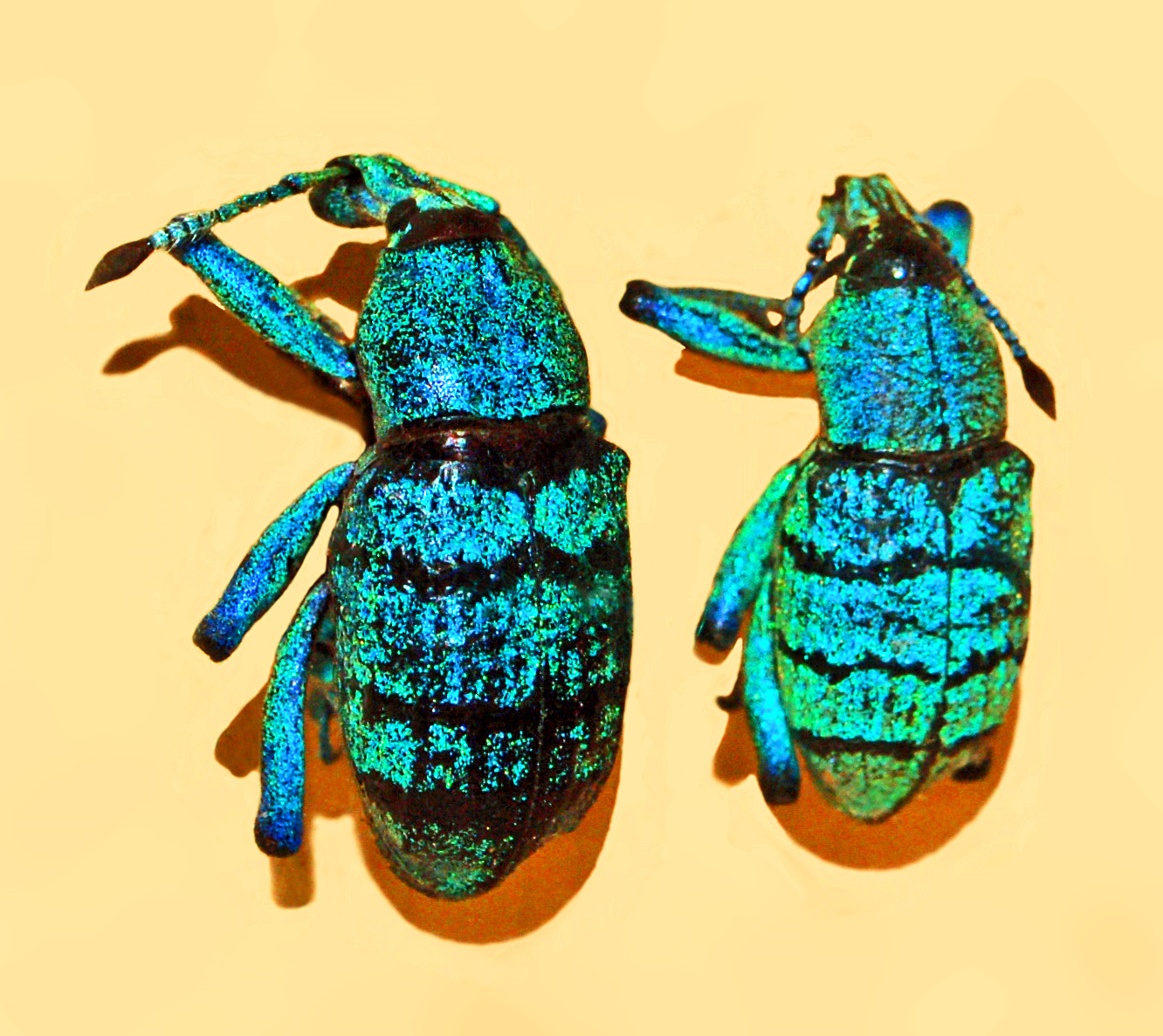
- Eupholus geoffroyi from New Guinea

Scientific classification
- Kingdom: Animalia
- Phylum: Arthropoda
- Clade: Pancrustacea
- Class: Insecta
- Order: Coleoptera
- Suborder: Polyphaga
- Infraorder: Cucujiformia
- Family: Curculionidae
- Genus: Eupholus
- Species: E. geoffroyi

Binomial name
- Eupholus geoffroyi (Guérin-Méneville, 1830)

Synonyms
- Eupholus mirabilis; Eupholus intermedius

= Eupholus geoffroyi =

Species of beetle

Eupholus geoffroyi is a species of beetle belonging to the family Curculionidae.

== Description ==
Eupholus geoffroyi can reach a length of about 18–29 millimetres (0.71–1.14 in). The basic colour is metallic blue-green, with three transversal black bands along the elytra. The blue-green colour derives from very small scales. The tops of the antennae are black.

== Distribution ==
This species can be found in New Guinea
