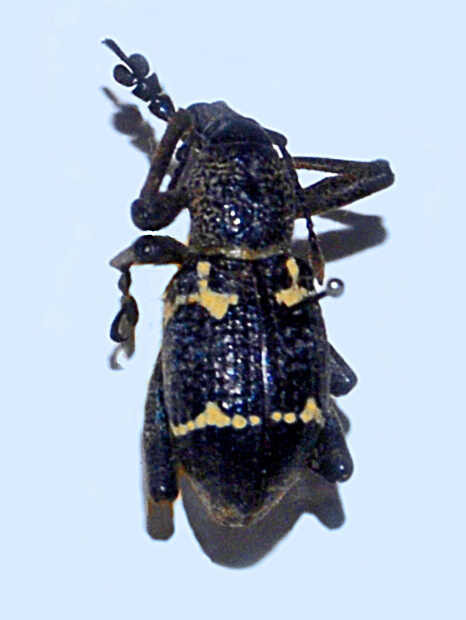
- Rhinoscapha richteri. Museum specimen

Scientific classification
- Kingdom: Animalia
- Phylum: Arthropoda
- Class: Insecta
- Order: Coleoptera
- Suborder: Polyphaga
- Infraorder: Cucujiformia
- Family: Curculionidae
- Genus: Rhinoscapha
- Species: R. richteri

Binomial name
- Rhinoscapha richteri Faust, 1891

= Rhinoscapha richteri =

Species of beetle

Rhinoscapha richteri is a species of beetle in the true weevil family. It occurs in New Guinea.
