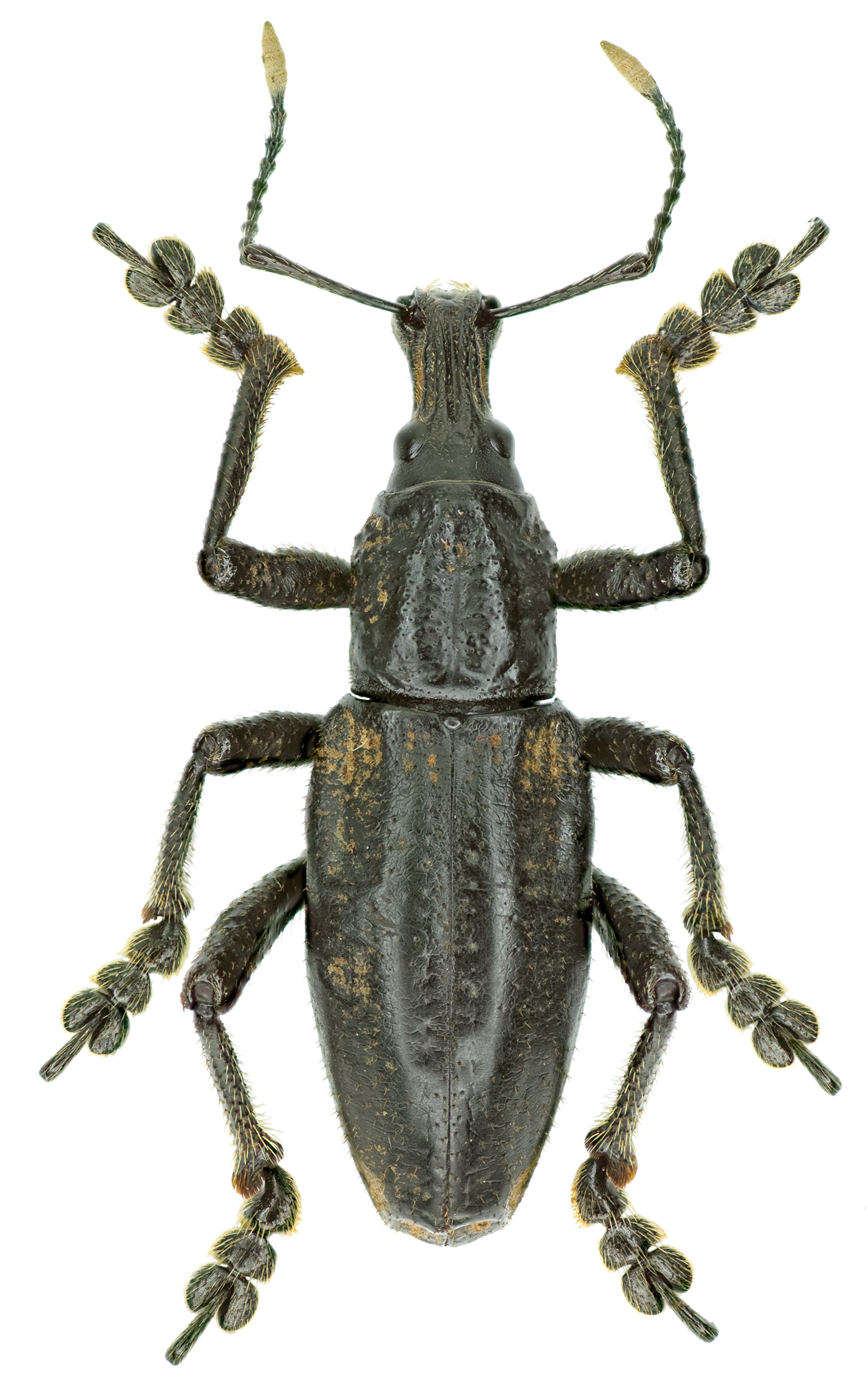
- Gymnopholus

Scientific classification
- Domain: Eukaryota
- Kingdom: Animalia
- Phylum: Arthropoda
- Class: Insecta
- Order: Coleoptera
- Suborder: Polyphaga
- Infraorder: Cucujiformia
- Family: Curculionidae
- Tribe: Eupholini
- Genus: Gymnopholus; Heller, 1901

Synonyms
- Aroaphila Heller, 1901

= Gymnopholus =

Genus of beetles

Gymnopholus is a genus of beetles in the family Curculionidae (true weevils) occurring in New Guinea. Many of them are notable for the growth of algae, diatoms, fungi, lichens and mosses on their backs(especially the subgenus Symbiopholus). The genus is divided into two subgenera (Gymnopholus and Symbiopholus) and contains the following species:

Subgenus Gymnopholus Heller, 1901

- Gymnopholus ajax
- Gymnopholus angustus
- Gymnopholus biformis
- Gymnopholus brandti
- Gymnopholus carinatus
- Gymnopholus colmani
- Gymnopholus cyphothorax
- Gymnopholus divaricatus
- Gymnopholus ellynae
- Gymnopholus engabenae
- Gymnopholus fulvospretus
- Gymnopholus gemmifer
- Gymnopholus glochidionis
- Gymnopholus gressitti
- Gymnopholus harti
- Gymnopholus hornabrooki
- Gymnopholus howcrofti
- Gymnopholus integrirostris
- Gymnopholus interpres
- Gymnopholus ludificator
- Gymnopholus magister
- Gymnopholus mammifer
- Gymnopholus macquarti
- Gymnopholus marshalli
- Gymnopholus muscosus
- Gymnopholus nothofagi
- Gymnopholus perspicax
- Gymnopholus pulcher
- Gymnopholus regalis
- Gymnopholus rennii
- Gymnopholus rostralis
- Gymnopholus rubi
- Gymnopholus sedlaceki
- Gymnopholus seriatus
- Gymnopholus setosus
- Gymnopholus splendidus
- Gymnopholus subnacreus
- Gymnopholus suturalis
  - Gymnopholus suturalis suturalis
  - Gymnopholus suturalis angularis
- Gymnopholus szentivanyi
- Gymnopholus toxopei
- Gymnopholus tricolor
- Gymnopholus urticivorax
- Gymnopholus vetustus
- Gymnopholus weiskei

Subgenus Symbiopholus Gressitt, 1966

- Gymnopholus acarifer
- Gymnopholus algifer
- Gymnopholus audax
- Gymnopholus botanicus
- Gymnopholus carolynae
- Gymnopholus cheesemanae
- Gymnopholus didiman
- Gymnopholus euryae
- Gymnopholus fallax
- Gymnopholus fungifer
- Gymnopholus hepaticus
- Gymnopholus herbarius
  - Gymnopholus herbarius herbarius
  - Gymnopholus herbarius oribatifer
- Gymnopholus huttoni
- Gymnopholus kokodae
- Gymnopholus lichenifer
- Gymnopholus magnus
- Gymnopholus nitidus
- Gymnopholus nodifer
- Gymnopholus piorae
- Gymnopholus praecox
- Gymnopholus rebeccae
- Gymnopholus reticulatus
- Gymnopholus rugicollis
- Gymnopholus schefflerae
- Gymnopholus schuurmannsiae
- Gymnopholus senex
- Gymnopholus shungolus
- Gymnopholus symbioticus
- Gymnopholus vegetatus
- Gymnopholus zoarkes
