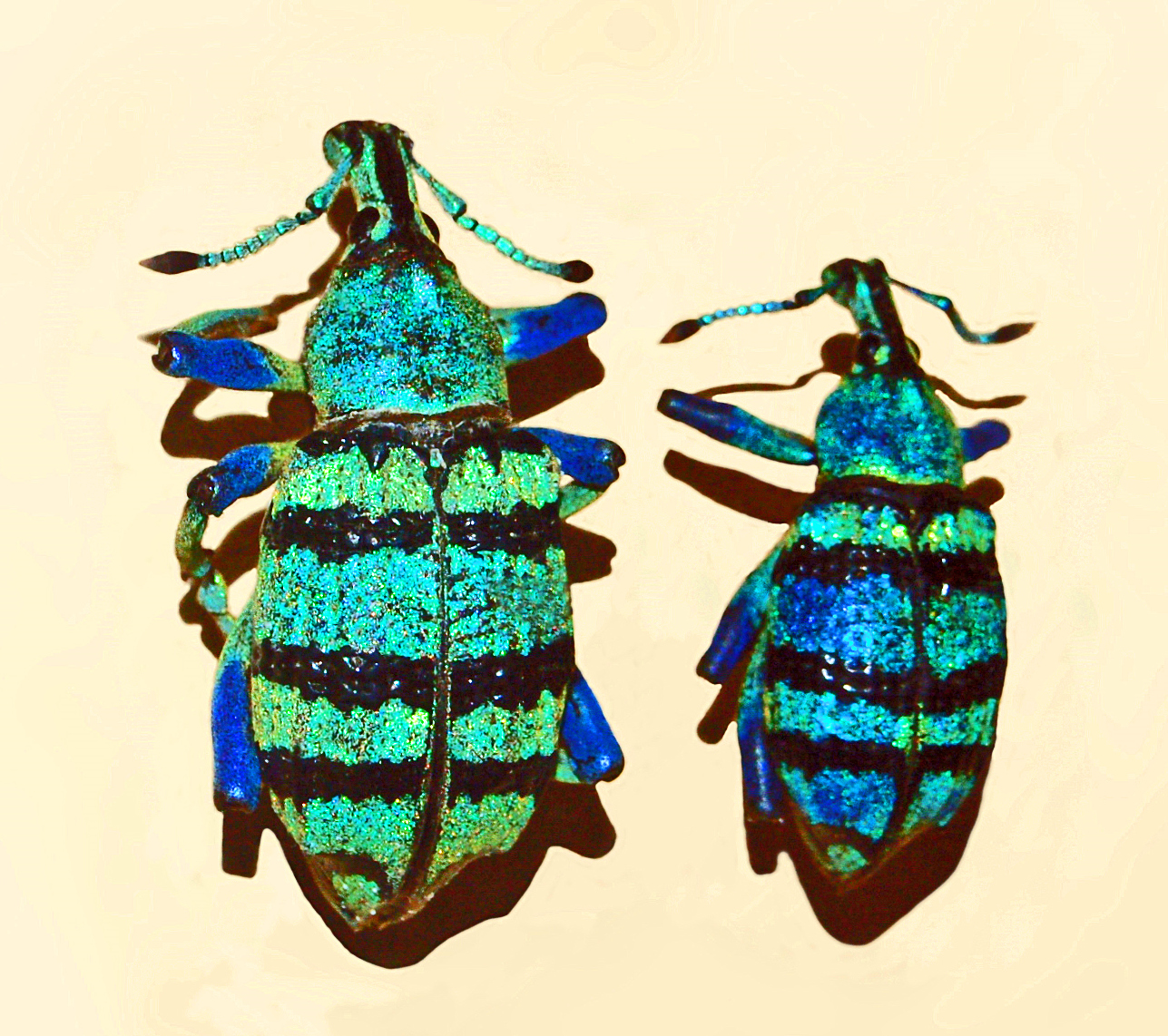
- Eupholus (schoenherri) petiti from New Guinea

Scientific classification
- Kingdom: Animalia
- Phylum: Arthropoda
- Clade: Pancrustacea
- Class: Insecta
- Order: Coleoptera
- Suborder: Polyphaga
- Infraorder: Cucujiformia
- Family: Curculionidae
- Genus: Eupholus
- Species: E. petitii

Binomial name
- Eupholus petitii Guérin-Méneville, 1841

Synonyms
- Eupholus aurifer Vollenhoven 1864

= Eupholus petitii =

Species of beetle

Eupholus petitii is a disputed species of beetle belonging to the family Curculionidae.

== Taxonomy ==
Eupholus petitii is now considered by some authors a subspecies of Eupholus schoenherri.

== Etymology ==
The species name schoenherri honours the Swedish entomologist Carl Johan Schönherr.

== Distribution ==
This species can be found in New Guinea.

== Description ==
Eupholus (schoenherri) petiti is usually metallic bright blue-green, with four transverse unequally spaced black shining bands on elytra. The last band is strongly arched. Antennae are club-shaped, it has a longitudinal groove on the vertex and the extremity of thighs is blue. The blue-green colour derives from very small scales, covering all over the elytra.
