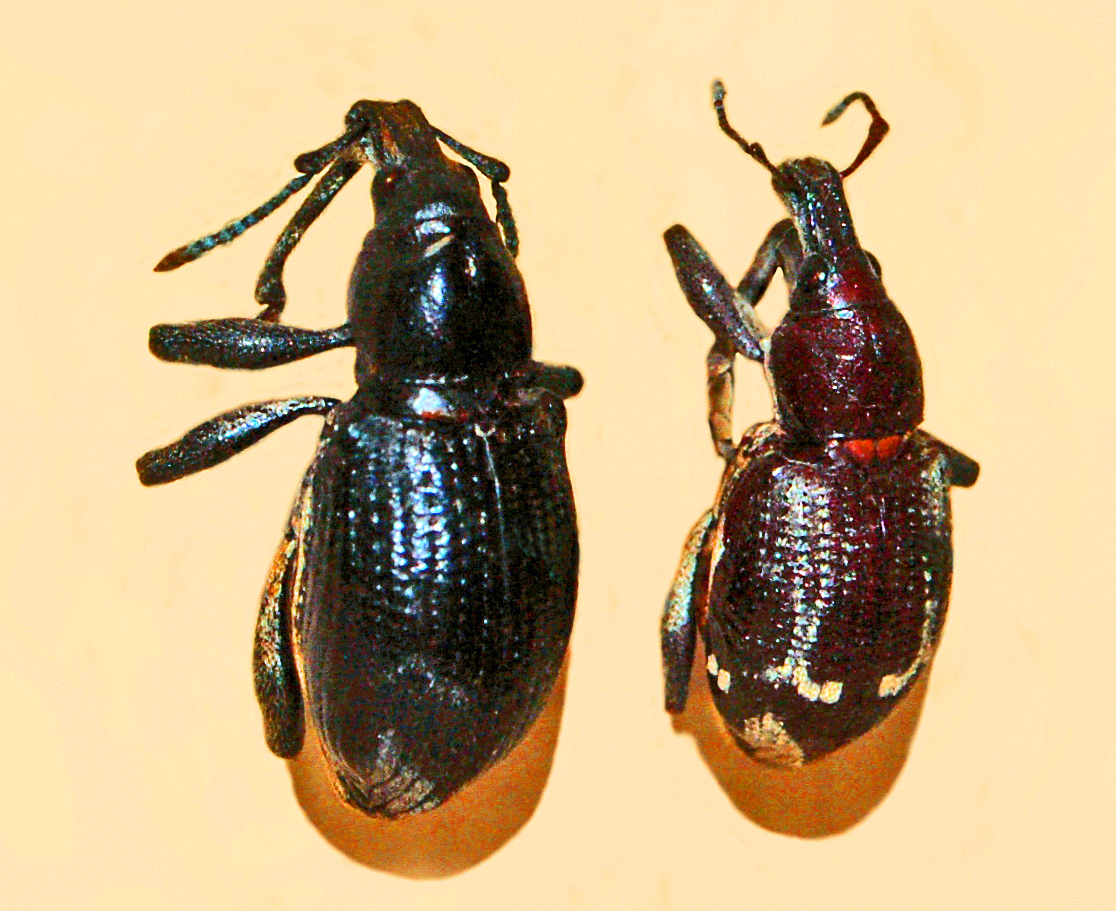
- Rhinoscapha funebris from New Guinea

Scientific classification
- Kingdom: Animalia
- Phylum: Arthropoda
- Clade: Pancrustacea
- Class: Insecta
- Order: Coleoptera
- Suborder: Polyphaga
- Infraorder: Cucujiformia
- Superfamily: Curculionoidea
- Family: Curculionidae
- Genus: Rhinoscapha
- Species: R. funebris

Binomial name
- Rhinoscapha funebris Chevrolat, 1880

= Rhinoscapha funebris =

Species of beetle

Rhinoscapha funebris is a species of beetle in the true weevil family. It occurs in Papua New Guinea.
