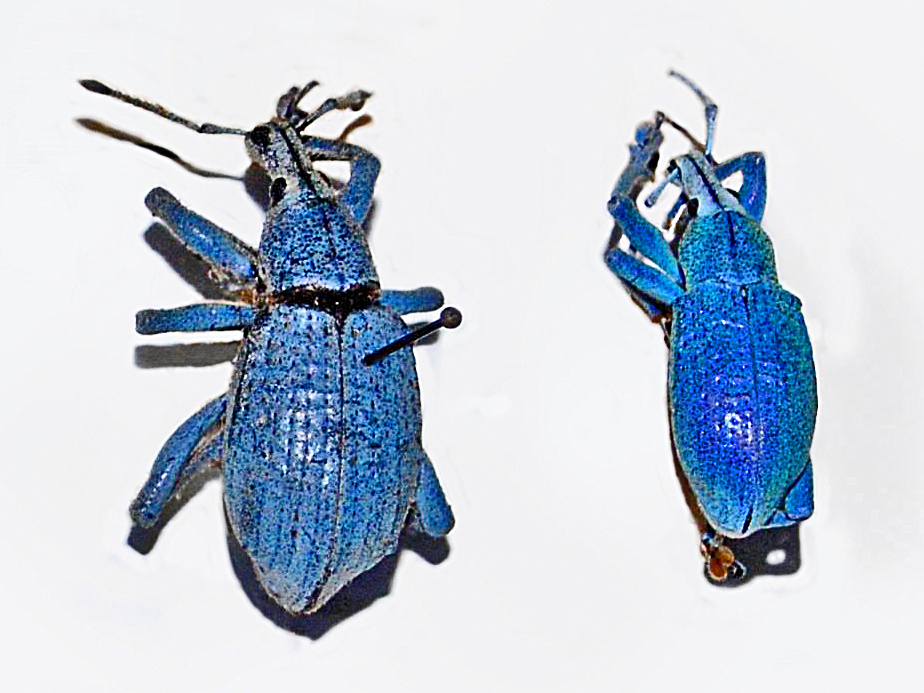
- Eupholus humeridens. Museum specimen

Scientific classification
- Domain: Eukaryota
- Kingdom: Animalia
- Phylum: Arthropoda
- Class: Insecta
- Order: Coleoptera
- Suborder: Polyphaga
- Infraorder: Cucujiformia
- Family: Curculionidae
- Genus: Eupholus
- Species: E. humeridens

Binomial name
- Eupholus humeridens Heller, 1895

= Eupholus humeridens =

Species of beetle

Eupholus humeridens is a species of beetle belonging to the family Curculionidae.

== Description ==
Eupholus azureus can reach a length of about 30 millimetres (1.2 in). This species is characterized by its cobalt blue colour, without speckles. There is a slight median longitudinal black line on the pronotum. The outer edge of the elytra and the edge of the pronotum are black. The elytra are pointed at the beetle's apex. The antennae are covered with sensory hairs.

== Distribution ==
This species can be found in lowland rainforests of Papua New Guinea.

== Bibliography ==
- Erster Beitrag zur Papuanischen Käferfauna. Abhandlungen und Berichte des Königlichen Zoologischen und Anthropologisch-Ethnographischen Museums zu Dresden, 16: 1–17.
