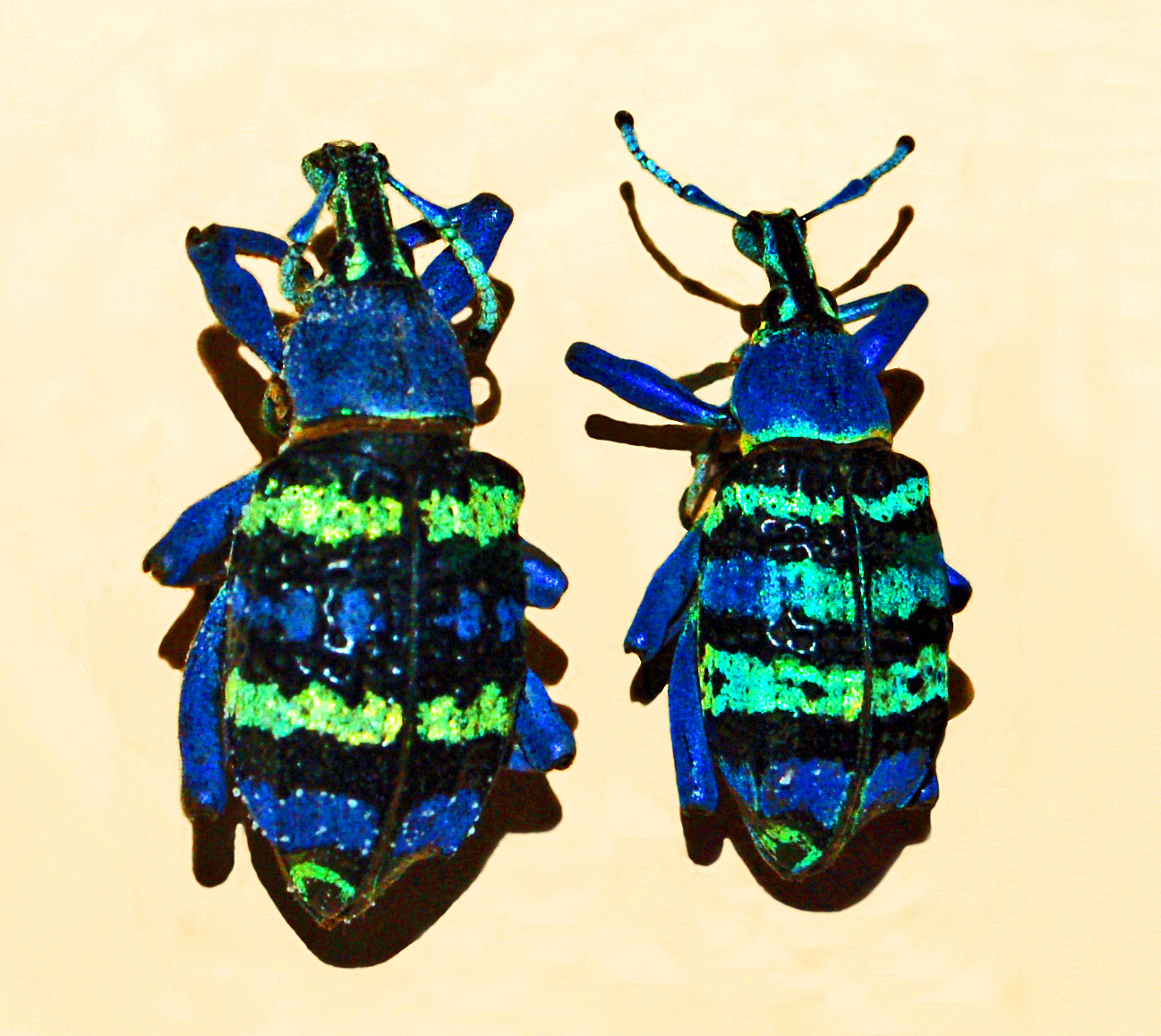
- Eupholus magnificus from New Guinea

Scientific classification
- Domain: Eukaryota
- Kingdom: Animalia
- Phylum: Arthropoda
- Class: Insecta
- Order: Coleoptera
- Suborder: Polyphaga
- Infraorder: Cucujiformia
- Family: Curculionidae
- Genus: Eupholus
- Species: E. magnificus

Binomial name
- Eupholus magnificus (Kirsch, 1877)

Synonyms
- Eupholus raffrayi; Eupholus magnificus v. concolor

= Eupholus magnificus =

Species of beetle

Eupholus magnificus is a species of beetle belonging to the family Curculionidae.

== Description ==
Eupholus magnificus can reach a length of about 24–28 millimetres (0.94–1.10 in). The elytra show transversal black, blue and green bands. The blue and green colours derives from very small scales. The pronotum and the legs are metallic blue. The top of the rostrum and the end of the antennae are black.

== Distribution ==
This species can be found in New Guinea.
