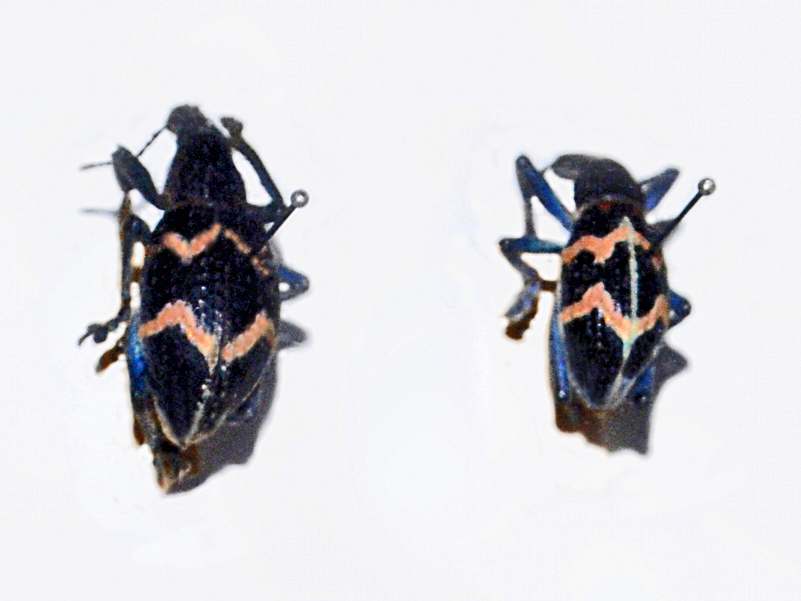
- Rhinoscapha biundulata. Museum specimen

Scientific classification
- Kingdom: Animalia
- Phylum: Arthropoda
- Clade: Pancrustacea
- Class: Insecta
- Order: Coleoptera
- Suborder: Polyphaga
- Infraorder: Cucujiformia
- Superfamily: Curculionoidea
- Family: Curculionidae
- Genus: Rhinoscapha
- Species: R. biundulata

Binomial name
- Rhinoscapha biundulata Heller, K.M., 1897-97

= Rhinoscapha biundulata =

Species of beetle

Rhinoscapha biundulata is a species of beetle in the true weevil family. It occurs in New Guinea.
