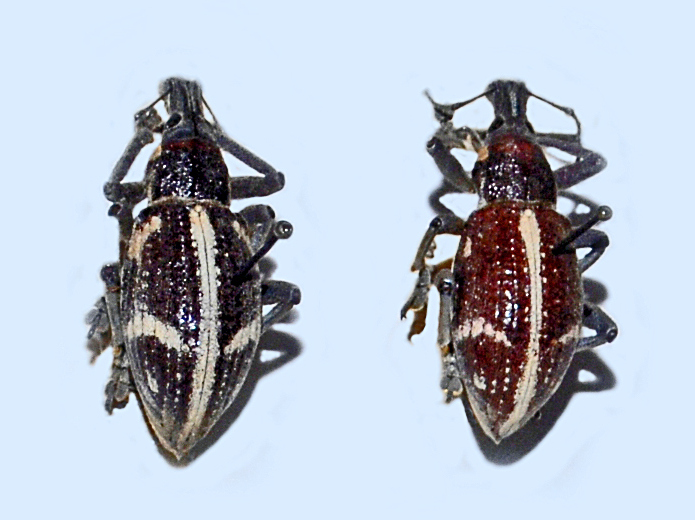
- Rhinoscapha schmeltzi. Museum specimen

Scientific classification
- Kingdom: Animalia
- Phylum: Arthropoda
- Class: Insecta
- Order: Coleoptera
- Suborder: Polyphaga
- Infraorder: Cucujiformia
- Family: Curculionidae
- Genus: Rhinoscapha
- Species: R. schmeltzi

Binomial name
- Rhinoscapha schmeltzi Fairmaire,1877

= Rhinoscapha schmeltzi =

Species of beetle

Rhinoscapha schmeltzi is a species of beetle in the true weevil family. It occurs in New Britain, Duke of York Island.
