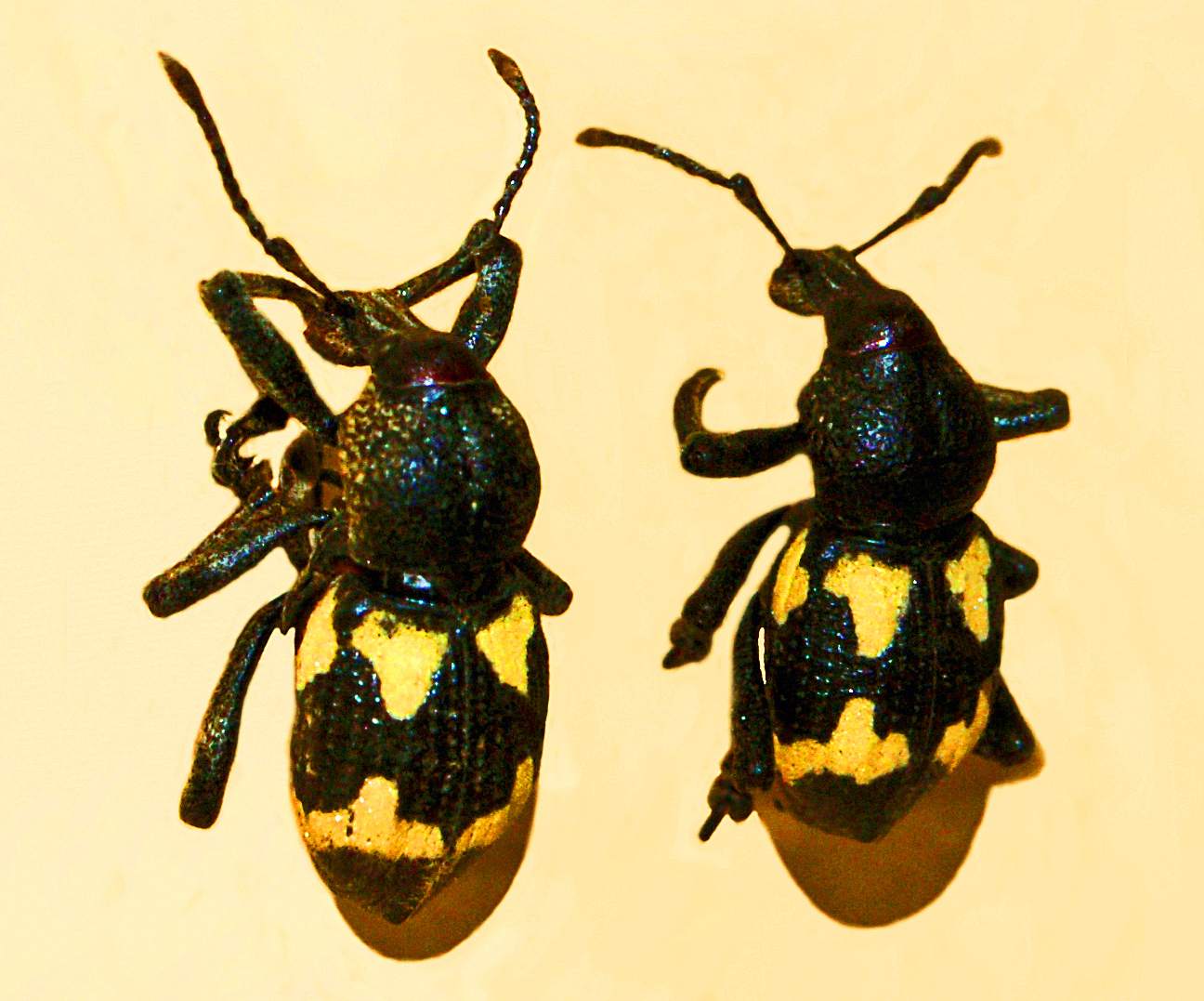
- Rhinoscapha loriai from New Guinea

Scientific classification
- Kingdom: Animalia
- Phylum: Arthropoda
- Class: Insecta
- Order: Coleoptera
- Suborder: Polyphaga
- Infraorder: Cucujiformia
- Family: Curculionidae
- Genus: Rhinoscapha
- Species: R. loriai

Binomial name
- Rhinoscapha loriai Faust, J., 1899

= Rhinoscapha loriai =

Species of beetle

Rhinoscapha loriai is a species of beetle in the true weevil family. It occurs in Papua New Guinea.
