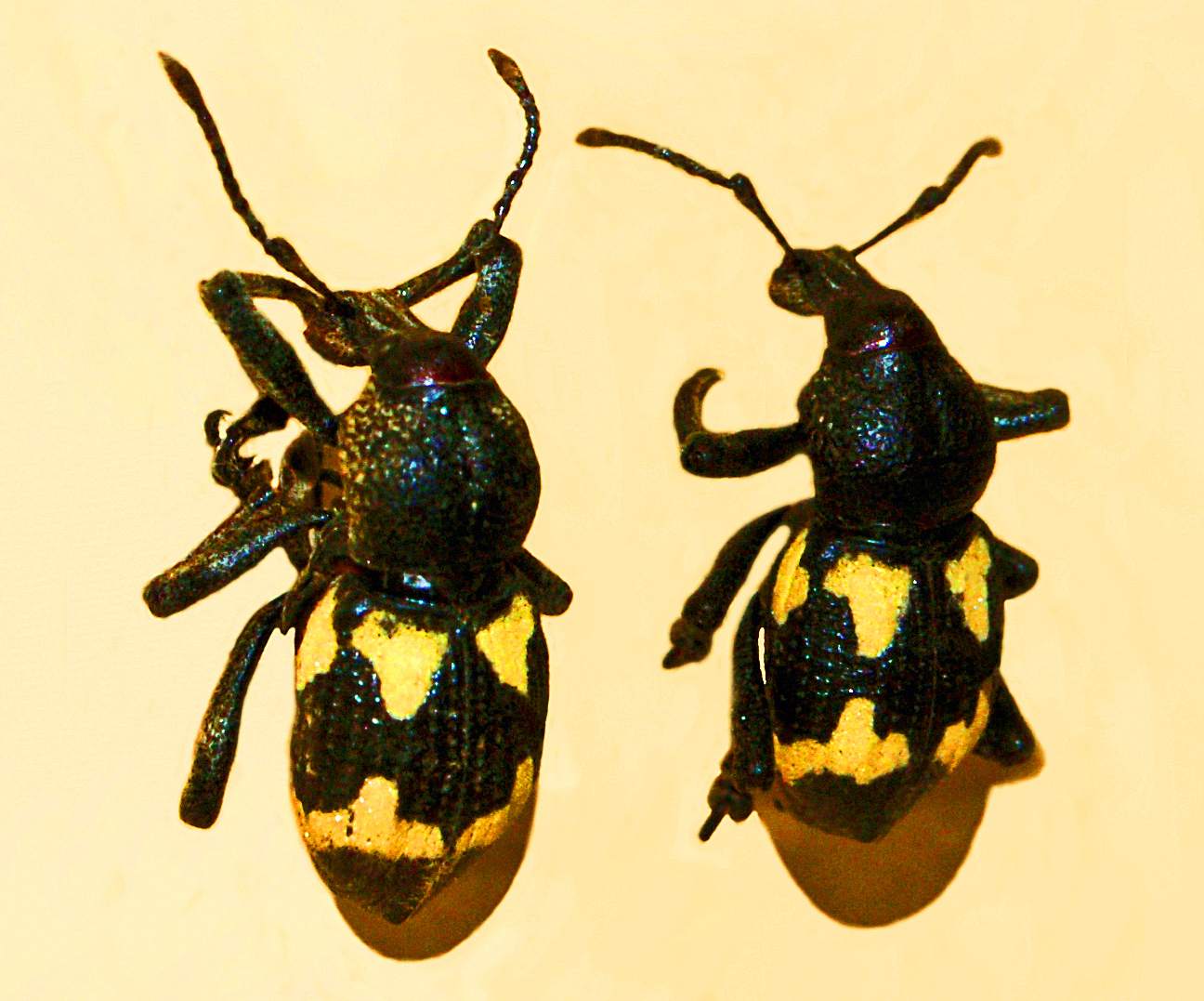
- Rhinoscapha loriai from New Guinea

Scientific classification
- Kingdom: Animalia
- Phylum: Arthropoda
- Class: Insecta
- Order: Coleoptera
- Suborder: Polyphaga
- Infraorder: Cucujiformia
- Family: Curculionidae
- Subfamily: Entiminae
- Tribe: Eupholini
- Genus: Rhinoscapha; Montrouzier, 1855

= Rhinoscapha =

Genus of beetles

Rhinoscapha is a genus of true weevil family.

== List of species ==
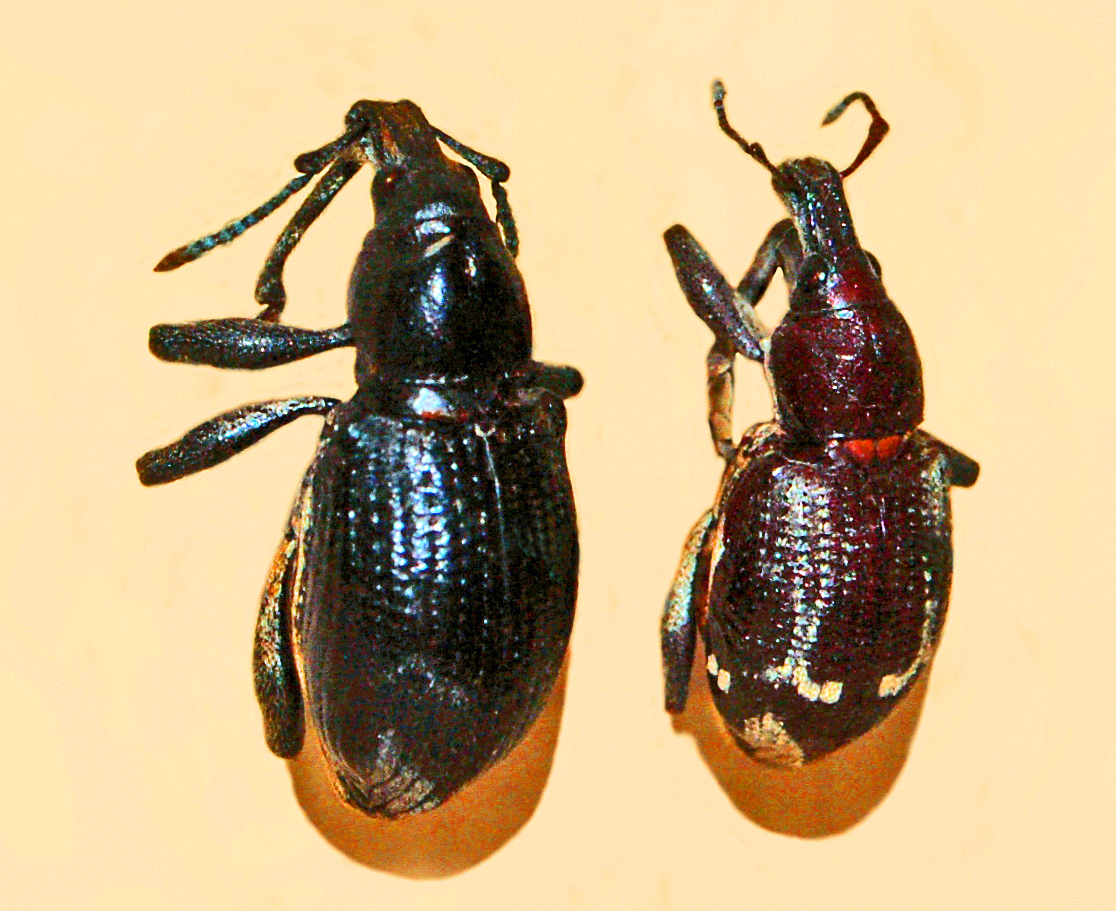
Rhinoscapha funebris

- Rhinoscapha aequata
- Rhinoscapha albaria
- Rhinoscapha albertisi
- Rhinoscapha albipennis
- Rhinoscapha alboguttata
- Rhinoscapha alboplagiatus
- Rhinoscapha alma
- Rhinoscapha amicta
- Rhinoscapha angusta
- Rhinoscapha arrogans
- Rhinoscapha aspersa
- Rhinoscapha aulica
- Rhinoscapha axillaris
- Rhinoscapha azureipes
- Rhinoscapha basilica
- Rhinoscapha batjanensis
- Rhinoscapha beccarii
- Rhinoscapha bicincta
- Rhinoscapha bifasciata
- Rhinoscapha biundulata
- Rhinoscapha bonthaina
- Rhinoscapha bucana
- Rhinoscapha canescens
- Rhinoscapha carinata
- Rhinoscapha chlora
- Rhinoscapha chloropunctata
- Rhinoscapha chrysochlora
- Rhinoscapha cincta
- Rhinoscapha cinnamomea
- Rhinoscapha cobaltinata
- Rhinoscapha consueta
- Rhinoscapha cristovallensis
- Rhinoscapha cruenta
- Rhinoscapha darnleyensis
- Rhinoscapha demissa
- Rhinoscapha diluta
- Rhinoscapha dohrni
- Rhinoscapha dolosa
- Rhinoscapha doriai
- Rhinoscapha douei
- Rhinoscapha dubia
- Rhinoscapha egregia
- Rhinoscapha eluta
- Rhinoscapha evanida
- Rhinoscapha fabriciusi
- Rhinoscapha fausti
- Rhinoscapha fenestrata
- Rhinoscapha formosa
- Rhinoscapha foveolata
- Rhinoscapha funebris
- Rhinoscapha gagatina
- Rhinoscapha ganglbaueri
- Rhinoscapha gebehiana
- Rhinoscapha gemmans
- Rhinoscapha generosa
- Rhinoscapha gestroi
- Rhinoscapha hasterti
- Rhinoscapha hedigeri
- Rhinoscapha heurni
- Rhinoscapha heydeni
- Rhinoscapha humboldtiana
- Rhinoscapha iligana
- Rhinoscapha immaculata
- Rhinoscapha imperfecta
- Rhinoscapha impexa
- Rhinoscapha insignis
- Rhinoscapha integrirostris
- Rhinoscapha intermedia
- Rhinoscapha interrupta
- Rhinoscapha jordani
- Rhinoscapha laevior
- Rhinoscapha lagopyga
- Rhinoscapha lamasonga
- Rhinoscapha lameerei
- Rhinoscapha lapeyrousei
- Rhinoscapha leguilloui
- Rhinoscapha leochroma
- Rhinoscapha litoralis
- Rhinoscapha loriai
- Rhinoscapha lunulata
- Rhinoscapha maclayi
- Rhinoscapha margaritifera
- Rhinoscapha meridiana
- Rhinoscapha merrillei
- Rhinoscapha miliaris
- Rhinoscapha neglecta
- Rhinoscapha nitidifrons
- Rhinoscapha oblita
- Rhinoscapha obsidiana
- Rhinoscapha opalescens
- Rhinoscapha papei
- Rhinoscapha pauperula
- Rhinoscapha perfecta
- Rhinoscapha perversa
- Rhinoscapha plagiata
- Rhinoscapha plicata
- Rhinoscapha primitiva
- Rhinoscapha pulicaria
- Rhinoscapha pulverulenta
- Rhinoscapha ribbei
- Rhinoscapha richteri
- Rhinoscapha roseipes
- Rhinoscapha roseiventris
- Rhinoscapha rothschildi
- Rhinoscapha rufithorax
- Rhinoscapha sanguinicollis
- Rhinoscapha scalaris
- Rhinoscapha schmeltzi
- Rhinoscapha sellata
- Rhinoscapha simplex
- Rhinoscapha sordida
- Rhinoscapha staintoni
- Rhinoscapha staudingeri
- Rhinoscapha stolifera
- Rhinoscapha striatopunctata
- Rhinoscapha stridulatoria
- Rhinoscapha subhumeralis
- Rhinoscapha suturalis
- Rhinoscapha thomsoni
- Rhinoscapha tricolor
- Rhinoscapha tuberculata
- Rhinoscapha uniformis
- Rhinoscapha usta
- Rhinoscapha vana
- Rhinoscapha verrucosa
- Rhinoscapha vibrans
- Rhinoscapha vilis
- Rhinoscapha viridans
- Rhinoscapha viridisparsa
- Rhinoscapha viridula
- Rhinoscapha vollenhoveni
- Rhinoscapha vormanni
- Rhinoscapha wichmanni
- Rhinoscapha x-album
- Rhinoscapha zonata
