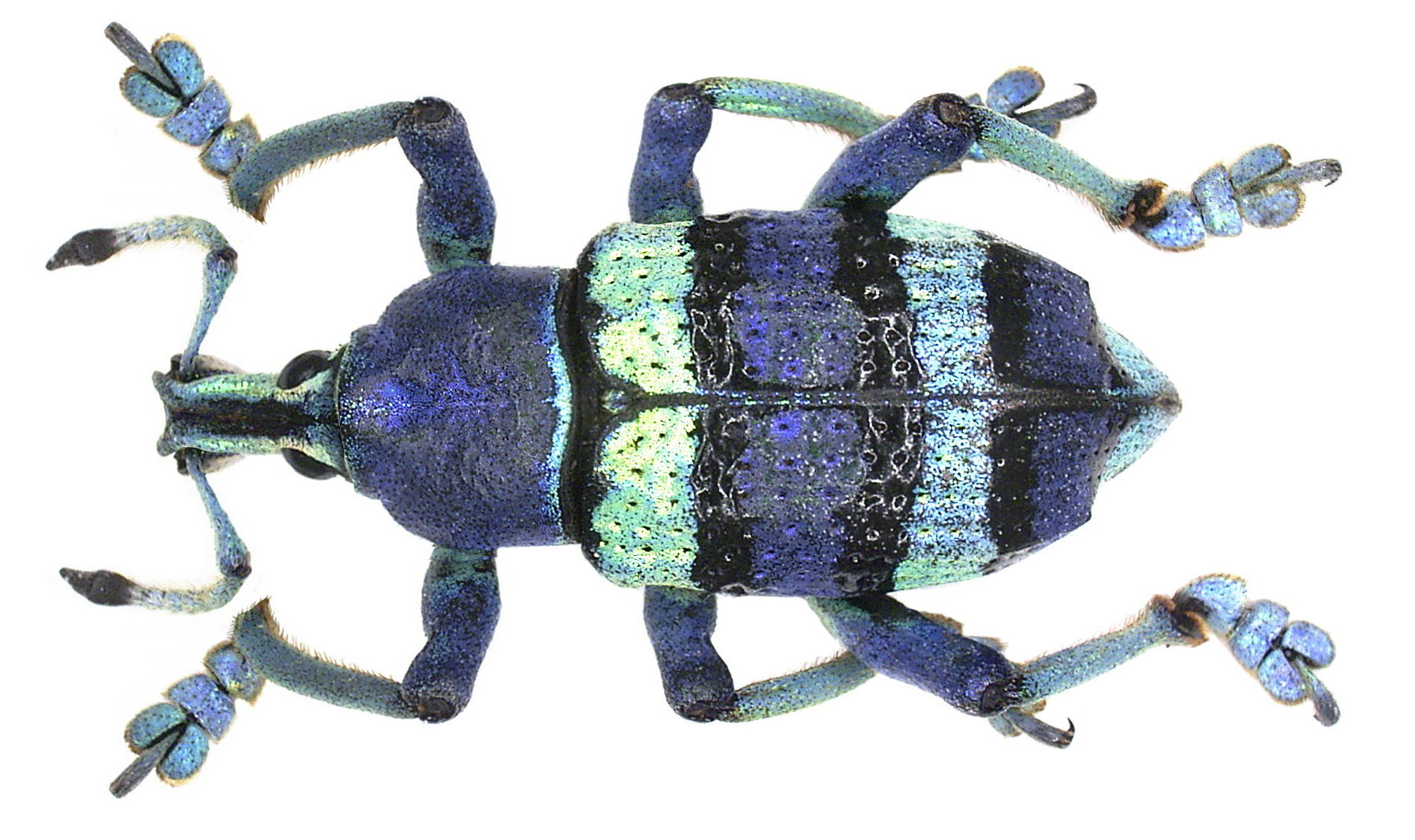
- Eupholus schoenherrii schoenherrii from Bulolo, New Guinea

Scientific classification
- Kingdom: Animalia
- Phylum: Arthropoda
- Clade: Pancrustacea
- Class: Insecta
- Order: Coleoptera
- Suborder: Polyphaga
- Infraorder: Cucujiformia
- Family: Curculionidae
- Genus: Eupholus
- Species: E. schoenherrii

Binomial name
- Eupholus schoenherrii (Guérin-Méneville, 1838)

Synonyms
- Eupholus celebesus; Eupholus desmaresti; Eupholus salawattensis; Eupholus latreillei; Eupholus guerini; Eupholus schoenherri; Eupholus schoenherrii v. arfaki; and see text

= Eupholus schoenherrii =

Species of beetle

Eupholus schoenherrii is a species of beetle belonging to the family Curculionidae. Eupholus petitii is sometimes included here as a subspecies.

== Description ==
Eupholus schoenherrii can reach a length of about 25–31 millimetres (0.98–1.22 in). The basic colour of this species is quite variable. Usually it is metallic blue-green, with some transversal black bands along the elytra. The legs are bright blue. The blue-green colour derives from very small scales. The top of rostrum and the end of the antennae are black.

== Distribution ==
This species can be found in New Guinea.

== Etymology ==
The species name honours the Swedish entomologist Carl Johan Schönherr.
