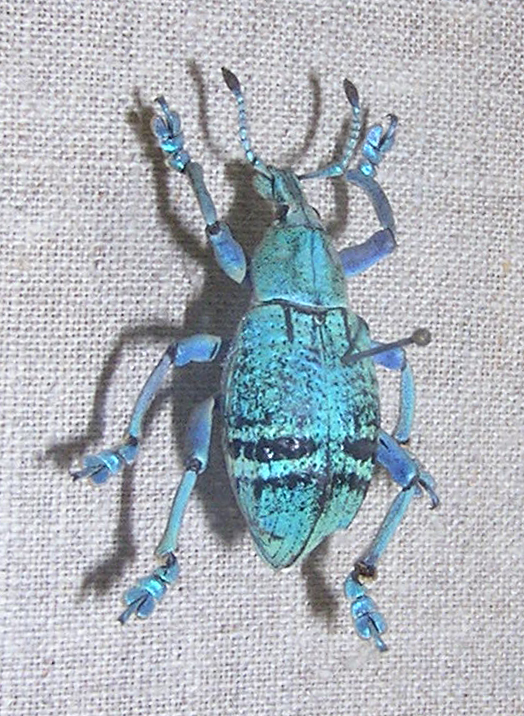
- E. azureus in the Saint Petersburg Zoological Museum

Scientific classification
- Kingdom: Animalia
- Phylum: Arthropoda
- Class: Insecta
- Order: Coleoptera
- Suborder: Polyphaga
- Infraorder: Cucujiformia
- Family: Curculionidae
- Subfamily: Entiminae
- Genus: Eupholus

= Eupholus =

Genus of beetles

Eupholus is a genus of beetle in the family Curculionidae. The genus includes some of the most colourful of the weevils. The colour may serve as a warning to predators that they are distasteful. Most species feed upon yam leaves, some of which are toxic to other animals. The species occur in New Guinea and adjacent islands. This genus was described by French entomologist Jean-Baptiste Alphonse Dechauffour de Boisduval in 1835.

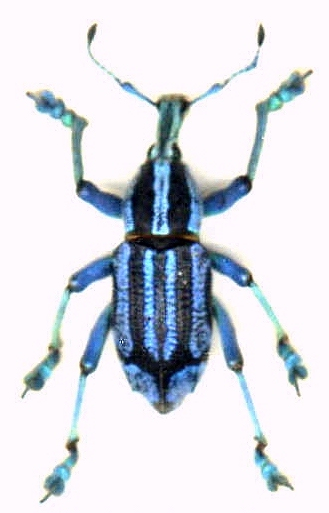
Eupholus bennetti

== List of the described species ==
- Eupholus albofasciatus Heller, 1910
- Eupholus alternans Kirsch, 1877
- Eupholus amaliae Gestro, 1875
- Eupholus amalulu Porion, 1993
- Eupholus antonkozlovi Porion & Audibert, 2019
- Eupholus astrolabensis Heller, 1937
- Eupholus azureus MacLeay, 1885
- Eupholus beccari Gestro, 1875
- Eupholus bennetti Gestro, 1876
- Eupholus bennigseni Heller, 1908
- Eupholus brossardi Limoges & Le Tirant, 2010
- Eupholus browni Bates, 1877
- Eupholus bruyni Gestro, 1885
- Eupholus chaminadei Porion, 2000
- Eupholus chevrolati Guérin-Meneville, 1830
- Eupholus cinnamomeus Pascoe, 1888
- Eupholus circulifer Riedel & Porion, 2009
- Eupholus clarki Porion, 1993
- Eupholus compositus Faust, 1892
- Eupholus cuvieri Guérin-Meneville, 1830
- Eupholus decempustulatus (Gestro, 1879)
- Eupholus detanii Limoges & Porion, 2004
- Eupholus dhuyi Porion, 1993
- Eupholus ducopeaui Porion, 2000
- Eupholus euphrosyne Porion, 1993
- Eupholus faisali Grasso, 2019
- Eupholus fleurenti Porion, 1993
- Eupholus geoffroyi Guérin-Meneville, 1830
- Eupholus helleri Porion, 1993
- Eupholus hephaistos Porion, 1993
- Eupholus hudsoni Porion, 2000
- Eupholus humeralis Heller, 1908
- Eupholus humeridens Heller, 1895
- Eupholus inopinatus Porion & Audibert, 2020
- Eupholus kotaseaoi Porion, 2000
- Eupholus kuntzmannorum Limoges & Porion, 2004
- Eupholus labbei Porion, 2000
- Eupholus lachaumei Porion, 1993
- Eupholus lacordairei Limoges & Porion, 2004
- Eupholus leblanci Limoges & Porion, 2004
- Eupholus linnei J. Thomson, 1857
- Eupholus loriae Gestro, 1902
- Eupholus lorrainei Limoges & Le Tirant, 2010
- Eupholus magnificus Kirsch, 1877
- Eupholus malotrus Porion, 2000
- Eupholus mamberamonis Heller, 1942
- Eupholus messageri Porion, 1993
- Eupholus mimicus Riedel, 2010
- Eupholus nagaii Porion, 1993
- Eupholus nickerli Heller, 1913
- Eupholus petitii Guérin-Méneville, 1841
- Eupholus prasinus Heller, 1910
- Eupholus quadrimaculatus Kirsch, 1877
- Eupholus quinitaenia Heller, 1915
- Eupholus rigouti Porion, 1993
- Eupholus saugrenus Porion, 1993
- Eupholus schneideri Riedel, 2002
- Eupholus schoenherri Guérin-Meneville, 1830
- Eupholus sedlaceki Riedel, 2010
- Eupholus sofia Porion, 2000
- Eupholus suhandai Porion, 2000
- Eupholus sulcicollis Heller, 1915
- Eupholus tupinierii Guérin-Méneville, 1838
- Eupholus vehti Heller, 1914
- Eupholus vlasimskii Balke & Riedel in Riedel, 2002
- Eupholus waigeuensis Limoges & Porion, 2004
