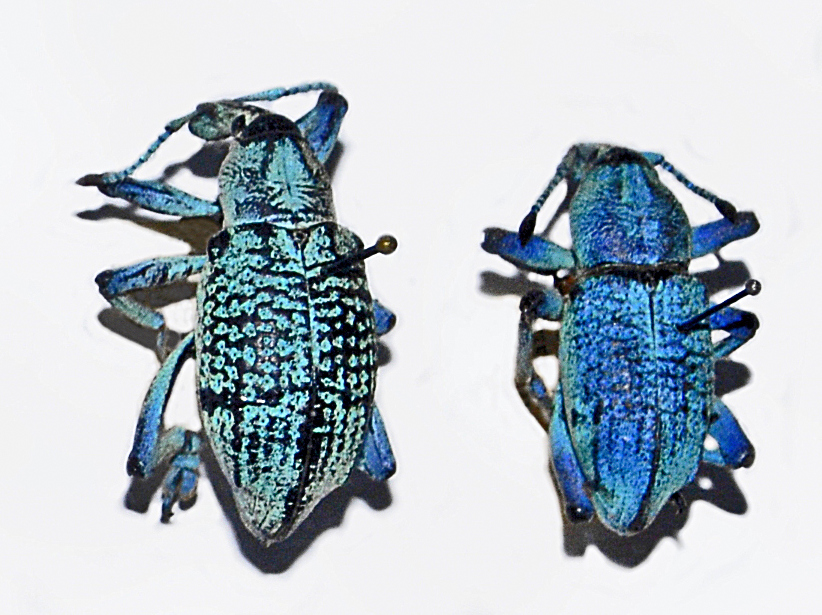
- Eupholus azureus. Museum specimen

Scientific classification
- Kingdom: Animalia
- Phylum: Arthropoda
- Class: Insecta
- Order: Coleoptera
- Suborder: Polyphaga
- Infraorder: Cucujiformia
- Family: Curculionidae
- Genus: Eupholus
- Species: E. azureus

Binomial name
- Eupholus azureus MacLeay, 1885

= Eupholus azureus =

Species of beetle

Eupholus azureus is a species of beetles belonging to the family Curculionidae.

== Description ==
Eupholus azureus can reach a length of about 32 millimetres (1.3 in). The elytra are broader than the thorax at the base and pointed at the apex. There are nine rows of large regular deep punctures on each elytron. The scutellum is very small and round. Eupholus azureus is slightly mottled black. The turquoise colour derives from very small scales. The thorax shows two smooth black lines on each sides of the median sulcus. Usually there are one or two transverse bands (one is larger) a little behind the middle and not reaching the suture. The suture, the scutellar region and the transverse bands are black. Legs are azure and the knee joins are black. Antennae are partially covered with tiny whitish sensory hair, while the club is brown or black. This species is characterized by sexual dimorphism, with males having a pronotum widely rounded and conical than females.

== Distribution ==
This species can be found in lowland rainforests of Papua New Guinea.

== Bibliography ==
- Macleay, W.[J.] 1885: The insects of the Maclay-coast, New Guinea. Proceedings of the Linnean Society of New South Wales, 9 (3): 704-705
- Thierry Poiron, Eupholus (Curculionidae), Les Coléoptères du Monde, vol. 19, 112 pages, éd. Sciences Nat, Venette
