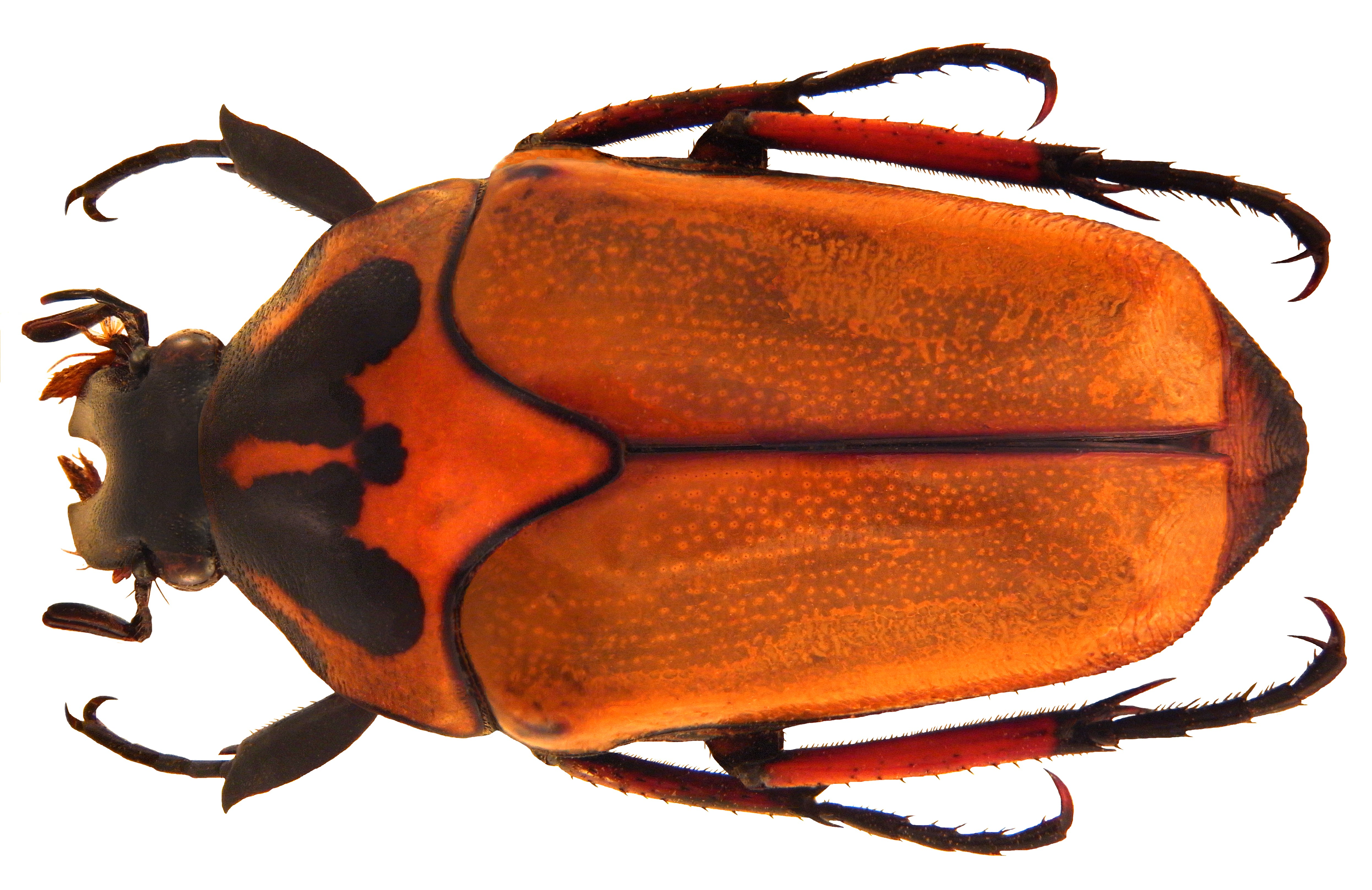
- Lomaptera bicolorata Moser, 1912

Scientific classification
- Kingdom: Animalia
- Phylum: Arthropoda
- Class: Insecta
- Order: Coleoptera
- Suborder: Polyphaga
- Infraorder: Scarabaeiformia
- Family: Scarabaeidae
- Subfamily: Cetoniinae
- Genus: Lomaptera; Gory & Percheron, 1833

Type species
- Cetonia papua Guérin-Méneville, 1830

= Lomaptera =

Genus of beetles

Lomaptera are beetles from the subfamily Cetoniinae, tribe Schizorhinini. The genus was created by Gory & Percheron, in 1833. The type species of the genus is Cetonia papua Guérin-Méneville, 1830. These cetoniids have the tip of the scutellum invisible, which makes the difference with the genus Ischiopsopha.

The genus is spread throughout the whole Australian region.

== Species ==
- Lomaptera abdominalis Moser, 1906
- Lomaptera aciculata Heller, 1899
- Lomaptera adelpha J. Thomson, 1857
- Lomaptera albertisi Gestro, 1874
- Lomaptera allardi Rigout, 1997
- Lomaptera annae Heller, 1899
- Lomaptera antoinei Rigout, 1997
- Lomaptera arrowi Valck Lucassen, 1961
- Lomaptera aurata Gestro, 1879
- Lomaptera australis Wallace, 1867
- Lomaptera batchiana J. Thomson, 1860
- Lomaptera bretoni Rigout, 1997
- Lomaptera bugeiae Antoine, 2004
- Lomaptera burgeoni Valck Lucassen, 1961
- Lomaptera carinipyga Moser, 1917
- Lomaptera cinnamomea J. Thomson, 1878
- Lomaptera concolor Schürhoff, 1935
- Lomaptera helleriana Valck Lucassen, 1961
- Lomaptera corpulenta Janson, 1905
- Lomaptera cyclopensis Valck Lucassen, 1961
- Lomaptera darcisi Heller, 1899
- Lomaptera diaphonia Kraatz, 1880
- Lomaptera doriae Gestro, 1878
- Lomaptera doreica Mohnike, 1871
- Lomaptera exquisita Schürhoff, 1935
- Lomaptera fasciata Moser, 1923
- Lomaptera fluminensis Schürhoff, 1935
- Lomaptera foersteri Moser, 1913
- Lomaptera frederici Legrand, 2006
- Lomaptera fulgida Moser, 1910
- Lomaptera funebris Heller, 1899
- Lomaptera gagnyi Rigout, 1997
- Lomaptera geelvinkiana Gestro, 1876
- Lomaptera gestroi Valck Lucassen, 1961
- Lomaptera giesbersi Kraatz, 1894
- Lomaptera gilnicki Kraatz, 1885
- Lomaptera girouxi Le Thuaut, 2005
- Lomaptera gloriosa Raffray, 1878
- Lomaptera gracilis Valck Lucassen, 1961
- Lomaptera gressitti Rigout, 1997
- Lomaptera hackeri Lea, 1906
- Lomaptera helleri Moser, 1913
- Lomaptera helleriana Valck Lucassen, 1961
- Lomaptera horni Valck Lucassen, 1961
- Lomaptera hoyoisi Rigout, 1997
- Lomaptera humeralis Lansberge, 1880
- Lomaptera hyalina Moser, 1908
- Lomaptera insularis Valck Lucassen, 1961
- Lomaptera iridescens Heller, 1903
- Lomaptera joallandi Le Thuaut, 2005
- Lomaptera kaestneri Schürhoff, 1935
- Lomaptera limbata Heller, 1894
- Lomaptera linae Gestro, 1893
- Lomaptera loriae Gestro, 1893
- Lomaptera lousi Audureau, 2000
- Lomaptera lutea Janson, 1915
- Lomaptera macrophylla Gestro, 1874
- Lomaptera mayri Valck Lucassen, 1961
- Lomaptera meeki Valck Lucassen, 1961
- Lomaptera miaae Rigout, 1997
- Lomaptera mixta Rigout, 1997
- Lomaptera mortiana Valck Lucassen, 1961
- Lomaptera moseri Heller, 1915
- Lomaptera mucterophalloides Van de Poll, 1886
- Lomaptera mutabilis Moser, 1908
- Lomaptera mycterophallus Heller, 1915
- Lomaptera negata Heller, 1899
- Lomaptera nickerli Schoch, 1898
- Lomaptera orientalis Valck Lucassen, 1961
- Lomaptera otakwana Valck Lucassen, 1961
- Lomaptera pallidipes Kraatz, 1895
- Lomaptera papua (Guérin-Méneville, 1830)
- Lomaptera pepini Rigout, 1997
- Lomaptera prasina Kraatz, 1887
- Lomaptera pseudannae Schürhoff, 1935
- Lomaptera pseudopulchella Valck Lucassen, 1961
- Lomaptera pseudorufa Heller, 1899
- Lomaptera pulchella Janson, 1905
- Lomaptera punctata Montrouzier, 1857
- Lomaptera pusilla Kraatz, 1887
- Lomaptera pygidialis J. Thomson, 1860
- Lomaptera pygmaea Kraatz, 1880
- Lomaptera ribbei Kraatz, 1885
- Lomaptera rosselensis Valck Lucassen, 1961
- Lomaptera rotundata Valck Lucassen, 1961
- Lomaptera rubens Janson, 1915
- Lomaptera rufa Kraatz, 1880
- Lomaptera salvadori Gestro, 1876
- Lomaptera samuelsoni Rigout, 1997
- Lomaptera saruwagedana Schürhoff, 1935
- Lomaptera satanas Heller, 1902
- Lomaptera semicastanea Kraatz, 1887
- Lomaptera simbangensis Schürhoff, 1935
- Lomaptera sordida Schoch, 1898
- Lomaptera splendida Moser, 1913
- Lomaptera sticheri Alexis & Delpont, 2000
- Lomaptera subarouensis J. Thomson, 1860
- Lomaptera thoracica Valck Lucassen, 1961
- Lomaptera tuberculata Valck Lucassen, 1961
- Lomaptera pseudannae Schürhoff, 1935
- Lomaptera uyttenboogaarti De Jong, 1970
- Lomaptera varians Schürhoff, 1935
- Lomaptera versteegi Moser, 1926
- Lomaptera vrazi Schoch, 1898
- Lomaptera wahnesi Moser, 1906
- Lomaptera wollastoni Valck Lucassen, 1961
- Lomaptera xanthopyga Gestro, 1874

The details of the paramers have been published in the volume 25 of The Beetles of the World, together with many distribution maps.

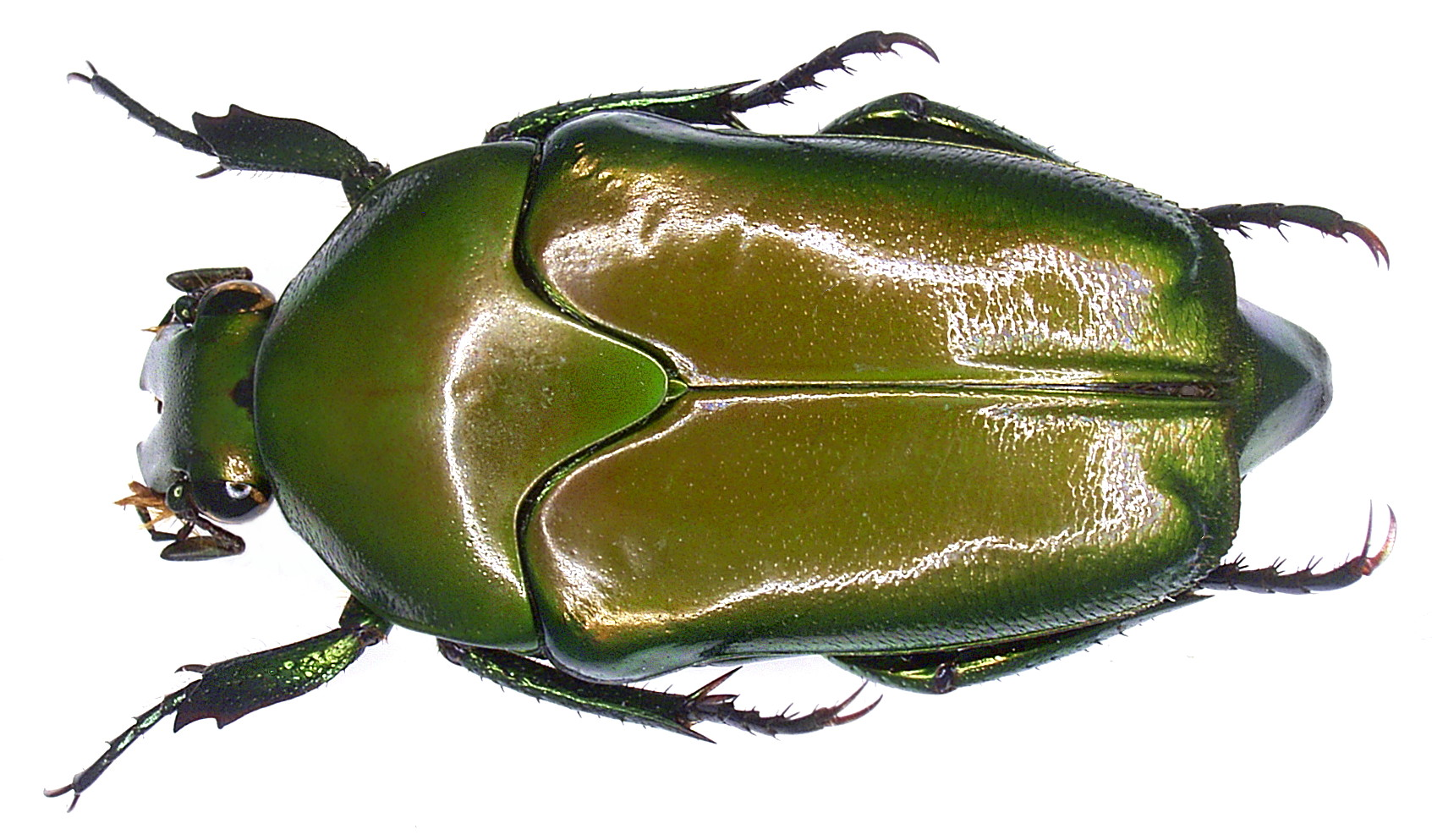
Lomaptera batchiana Thomson, 1860

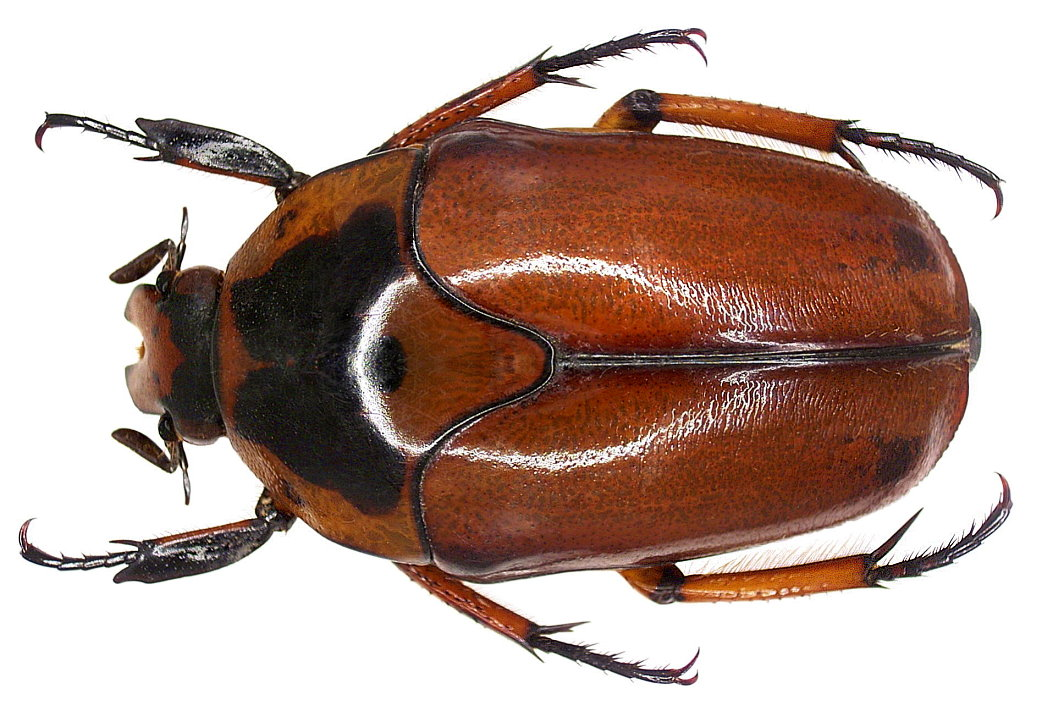
Lomaptera lutea Janson, 1905

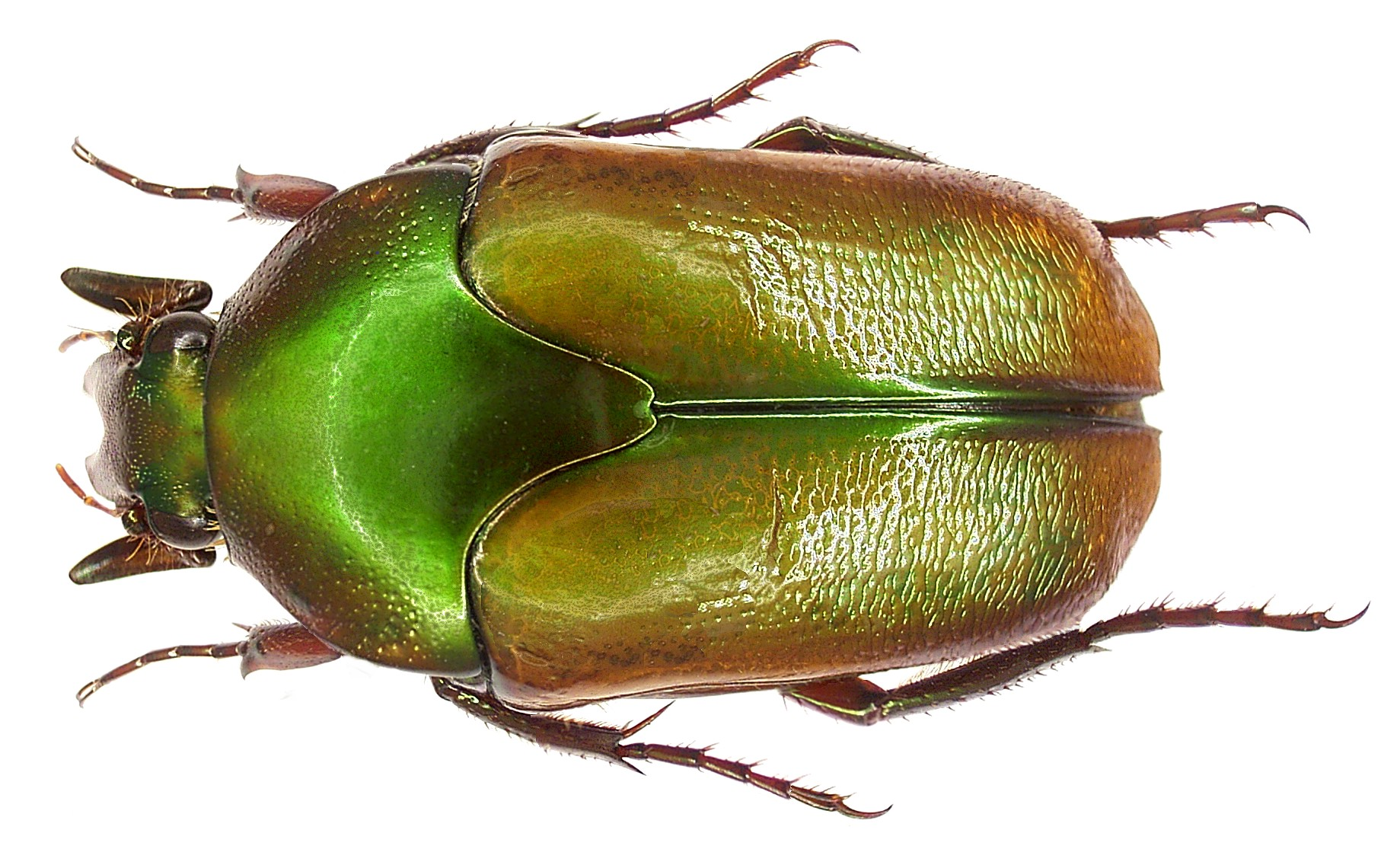
Lomaptera macrophylla Gestro, 1874
