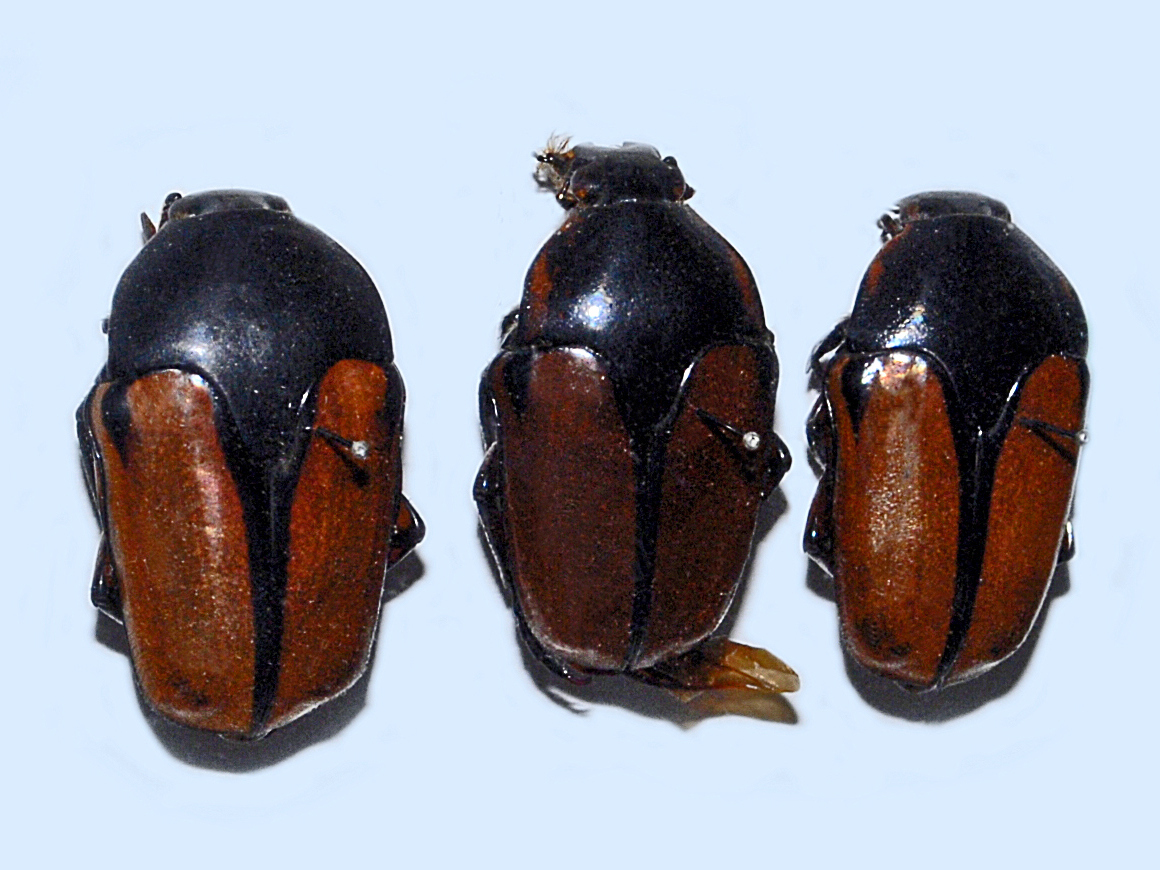
- Lomaptera wahnesi. Museum specimen

Scientific classification
- Kingdom: Animalia
- Phylum: Arthropoda
- Class: Insecta
- Order: Coleoptera
- Suborder: Polyphaga
- Infraorder: Scarabaeiformia
- Family: Scarabaeidae
- Genus: Lomaptera
- Species: L. wahnesi

Binomial name
- Lomaptera wahnesi Moser, 1906

Synonyms
- Lomaptera augusta Schürhoff, 1935; Lomaptera torricelliana Heller, 1910

= Lomaptera wahnesi =

Species of beetle

Lomaptera wahnesi is a species of beetles from the subfamily Cetoniinae, tribe Schizorhinini.

== Description ==
These cetoniids have the tip of the scutellum invisible, which makes the difference with the species of the genus Ischiopsopha.

== Distribution ==
This species is present in Papua New Guinea.
