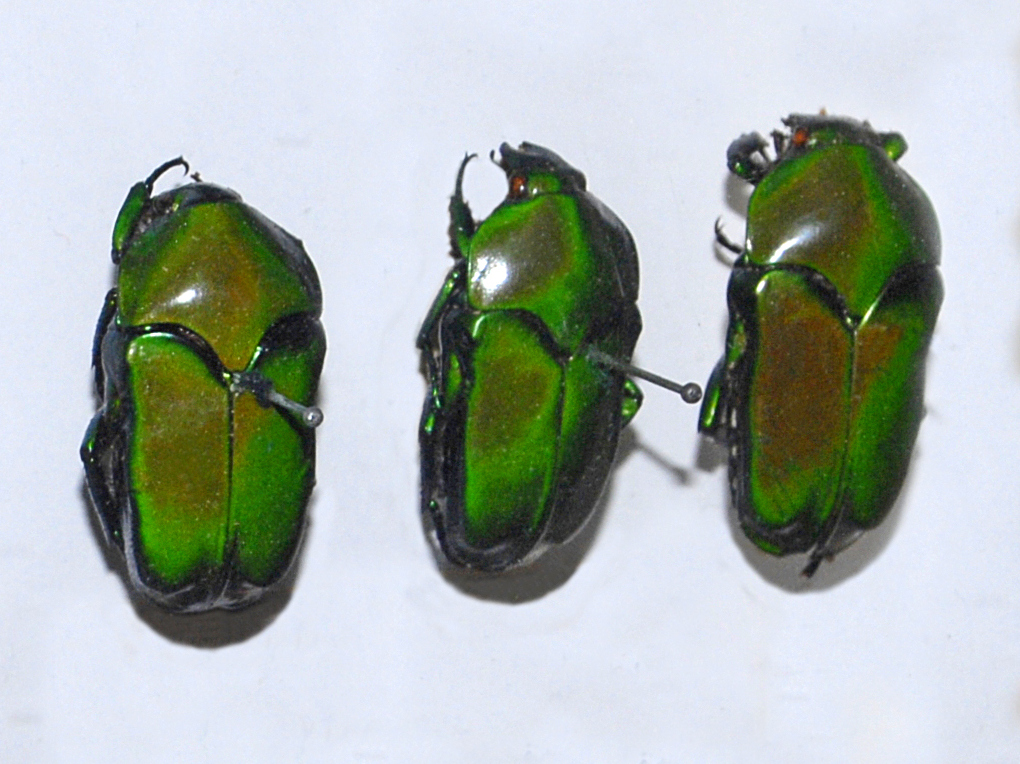
- Ischiopsopha lucivorax. Museum specimen.

Scientific classification
- Kingdom: Animalia
- Phylum: Arthropoda
- Class: Insecta
- Order: Coleoptera
- Suborder: Polyphaga
- Infraorder: Scarabaeiformia
- Family: Scarabaeidae
- Genus: Ischiopsopha
- Species: I. lucivorax

Binomial name
- Ischiopsopha lucivorax Kraatz, 1890

Synonyms
- Ischiopsopha rufopilosa

= Ischiopsopha lucivorax =

Species of beetle

Ischiopsopha lucivorax, the alien beetle, is a beetle from the family Scarabaeidae, subfamily Cetoniinae, tribe Schizorhinini.

== Subspecies ==
- Ischiopsopha lucivorax buloloensis Alexis & Delpont, 2000
- Ischiopsopha lucivorax lucivorax Kraatz, 1890

== Description ==
Ischiopsopha lucivorax can reach a length of about 25–31 millimetres (0.98–1.22 in). These beetles have a bright green colour with reddish reflections.

== Distribution ==
This species can be found in Indonesia and Papua New Guinea.
