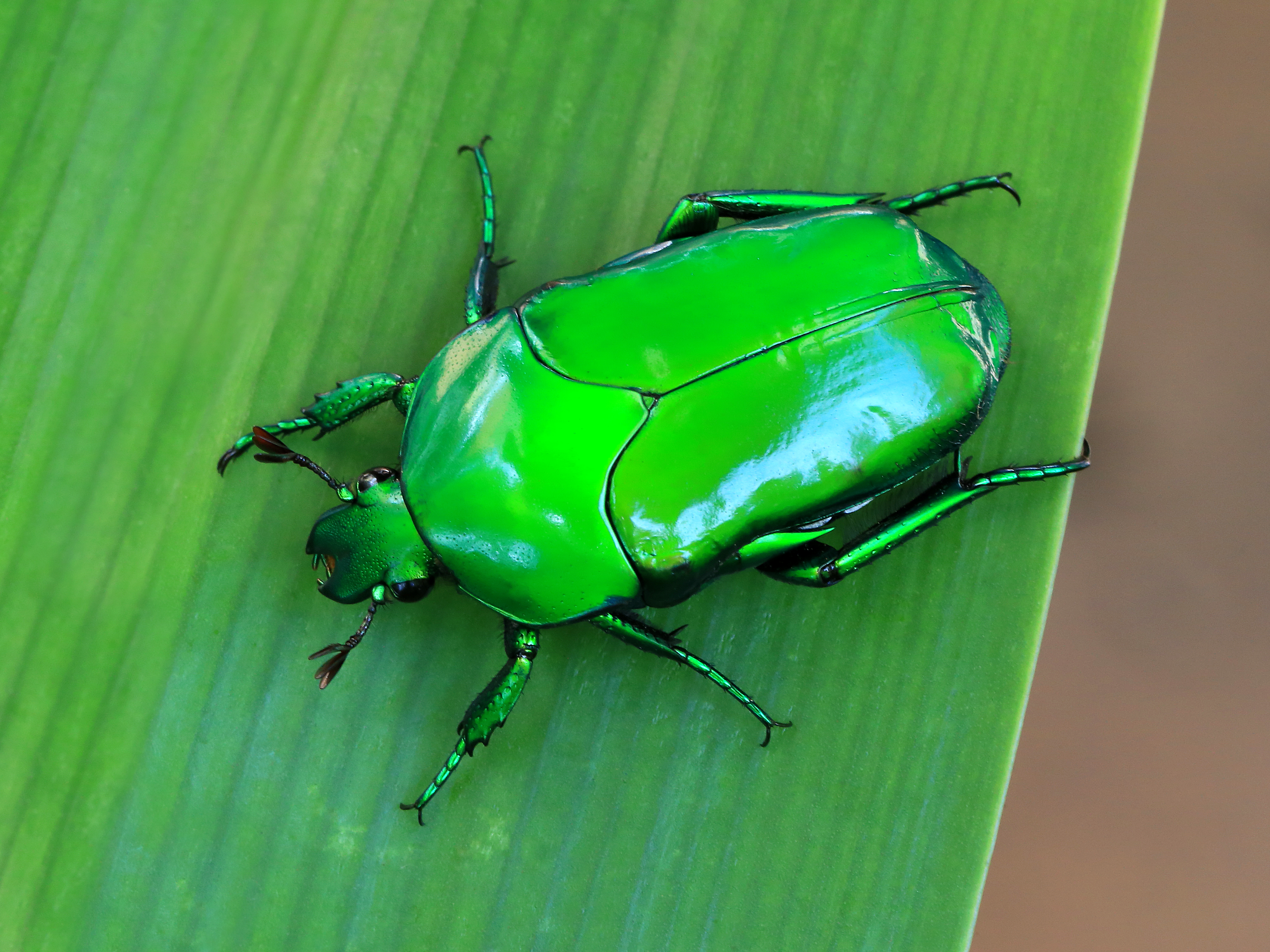

Scientific classification
- Kingdom: Animalia
- Phylum: Arthropoda
- Clade: Pancrustacea
- Class: Insecta
- Order: Coleoptera
- Suborder: Polyphaga
- Infraorder: Scarabaeiformia
- Family: Scarabaeidae
- Genus: Ischiopsopha
- Species: I. wallacei

Binomial name
- Ischiopsopha wallacei (Thomson, 1858)

Synonyms
- Lomaptera yorkiana

= Ischiopsopha wallacei =

Species of beetle

Ischiopsopha wallacei is a species of flower chafer from the family Scarabaeidae, subfamily Cetoniinae, tribe Schizorhinini.

== Description ==
Ischiopsopha wallacei can reach a length of about 30 mm. The beetles are an electric green colour, and have the tip of the scutellum visible.

== Distribution ==
This species inhabits the Cape York Peninsula region of Australia.
