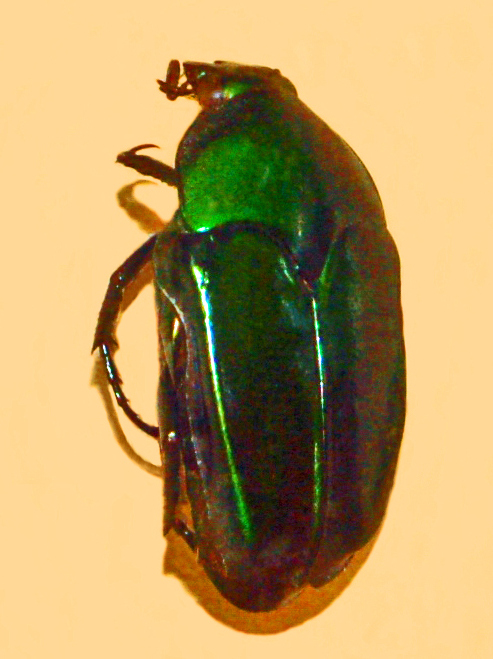
- Ischiopsopha plana from Ambon Island. Museum specimen

Scientific classification
- Kingdom: Animalia
- Phylum: Arthropoda
- Class: Insecta
- Order: Coleoptera
- Suborder: Polyphaga
- Infraorder: Scarabaeiformia
- Family: Scarabaeidae
- Genus: Ischiopsopha
- Species: I. plana

Binomial name
- Ischiopsopha plana (Paykull, 1817)

Synonyms
- Lomaptera valida Gory & Percheron, 1833; Lomaptera virens Blanchard, 1853

= Ischiopsopha plana =

Species of beetle

Ischiopsopha plana is a species of beetles from the family Scarabaeidae, subfamily Cetoniinae, tribe Schizorhinini.

== Description ==
The head, the thorax and the elytra of this beetle are metallic green. The tip of the scutellum is visible.

== Distribution ==
This species can be found in Indonesia (Solomon Islands, Maluku Islands, Ceram Island, Ambon Island).
