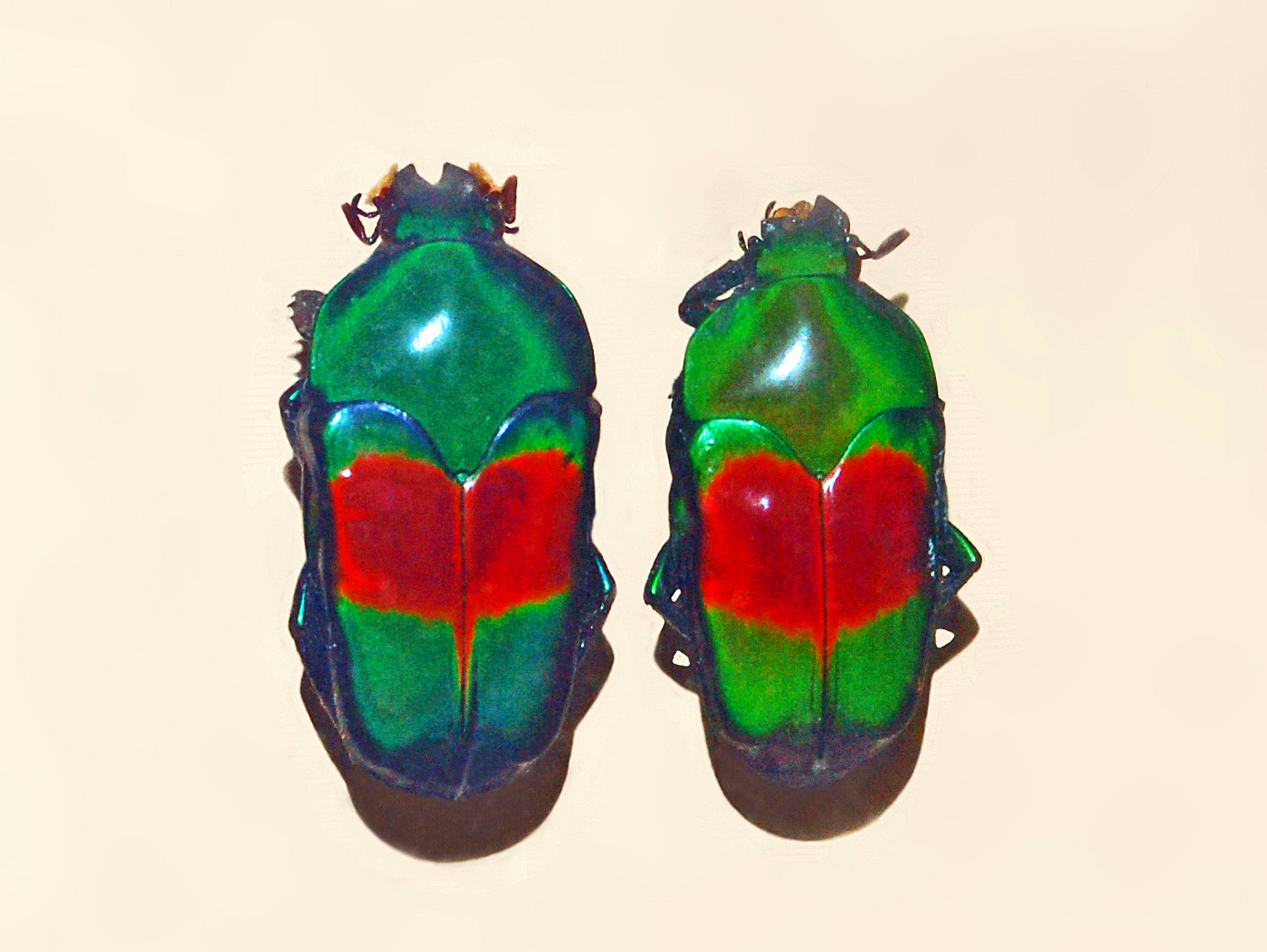

Scientific classification
- Kingdom: Animalia
- Phylum: Arthropoda
- Class: Insecta
- Order: Coleoptera
- Suborder: Polyphaga
- Infraorder: Scarabaeiformia
- Family: Scarabaeidae
- Genus: Ischiopsopha
- Species: I. jamesi

Binomial name
- Ischiopsopha jamesi (Waterhouse, 1876)

Synonyms
- Lomaptera jamesi Waterhouse, 1876; Ischiopsopha coerulea; Ischiopsopha olivacea; Ischiopsopha olivaceicolor

= Ischiopsopha jamesi =

Species of beetle

Ischiopsopha jamesi is a species of beetle from the family Scarabaeidae, subfamily Cetoniinae, tribe Schizorhinini.

== Description ==
Ischiopsopha jamesii can reach a length of about 30 mm. These beetles have an electric green and blue colour with a red-orange transversal band in the middle of elytra. They have the tip of the scutellum visible.

== Distribution ==
This species can be found in Papua New Guinea.
