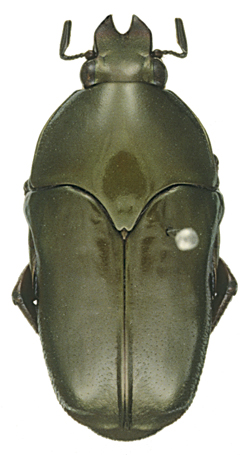
- Ischiopsopha hoyoisi

Scientific classification
- Kingdom: Animalia
- Phylum: Arthropoda
- Class: Insecta
- Order: Coleoptera
- Suborder: Polyphaga
- Infraorder: Scarabaeiformia
- Family: Scarabaeidae
- Subfamily: Cetoniinae
- Tribe: Schizorhinini
- Subtribe: Lomapterina
- Genus: Ischiopsopha; Gestro, 1874

Type species
- Cetonia bifasciata Quoy & Gaimard, 1824

= Ischiopsopha =

Genus of beetles

Ischiopsopha are beetles from the subfamily Cetoniinae, tribe Schizorhinini. The genus was described by Raffaello Gestro in 1874. The type species of the genus is Cetonia bifasciata Quoy & Gaimard, 1824. These cetoniids have only the tip of the scutellum visible. The genus is widespread throughout the whole Australian region.

== Species ==
- Ischiopsopha antoinei Allard, 1995
- Ischiopsopha arouensis (J. Thomson, 1857)
- Ischiopsopha arthuri Audureau, 2000
- Ischiopsopha asperipennis Miksic, 1978
- Ischiopsopha aurora (Kraatz, 1898)
- Ischiopsopha bennigseni Moser, 1906
- Ischiopsopha bifasciata (Quoy & Gaimard, 1824)
- Ischiopsopha blancbonnet Allard, 1995
- Ischiopsopha bonnetblanc Allard, 1995
- Ischiopsopha bruyni Lansberge, 1880
- Ischiopsopha cambodiensis (Wallace, 1867)
- Ischiopsopha carminata Devecis, 2008
- Ischiopsopha ceramensis (Wallace, 1867)
- Ischiopsopha clarki Allard, 1995
- Ischiopsopha chaminadei Antoine, 2004
- Ischiopsopha chuai Rigout, 1997
- Ischiopsopha concina (Wallace, 1867)
- Ischiopsopha cupreopyga Moser, 1926
- Ischiopsopha dechambrei Allard, 1995
- Ischiopsopha dives Gestro, 1876
- Ischiopsopha durvilli (Burmeister, 1842)
- Ischiopsopha emarginata Ritsema, 1879
- Ischiopsopha erratica Krikken, 1983
- Ischiopsopha esmeralda (Wallace, 1867)
- Ischiopsopha gagatina Heller, 1899
- Ischiopsopha gestroi Van der Poll, 1886
- Ischiopsopha harti Alexis & Delpont, 2000
- Ischiopsopha helleri Moser, 1906
- Ischiopsopha hoyoisi Rigout, 1997
- Ischiopsopha hudsoni Heller, 1894
- Ischiopsopha kerleyi Allard, 1995
- Ischiopsopha kuehbandneri Allard, 1995
- Ischiopsopha ignipennis Gestro, 1876
- Ischiopsopha inequalis Alexis & Delpont, 2000
- Ischiopsopha jamesi Waterhouse, 1876
- Ischiopsopha kerleyi Allard, 1995
- Ischiopsopha laglaizei (Lansberge, 1879)
- Ischiopsopha landfordi Allard, 1995
- Ischiopsopha latreille (Gory & Percheron, 1833)
- Ischiopsopha lucivorax Kraatz, 1890
- Ischiopsopha macfarlanei Heller, 1895
- Ischiopsopha meeki Krikken, 1983
- Ischiopsopha minettii Allard, 1995
- Ischiopsopha nigroloba Ritsema, 1879
- Ischiopsopha nosdhuhi Alexis & Delpont, 2000
- Ischiopsopha obiensis Miksic, 1976
- Ischiopsopha olivacea (J. Thomson, 1860)
- Ischiopsopha plana (Paykull, 1817)
- Ischiopsopha poggii Allard, 1995
- Ischiopsopha pulchripes (J. Thomson, 1877)
- Ischiopsopha purpureitarsis Moser, 1912
- Ischiopsopha ritsemae Van der Poll, 1886
- Ischiopsopha rugata (Blanchard, 1842)
- Ischiopsopha ruteri Allard, 1995
- Ischiopsopha samuelsoni Rigout, 1997
- Ischiopsopha scheini Schürhoff, 1942
- Ischiopsopha similis Kraatz, 1895
- Ischiopsopha sticheri Delpont, 2009
- Ischiopsopha striolatissima Delpont, 1995
- Ischiopsopha tibialis Kraatz, 1895
- Ischiopsopha tomiensis Schürhoff, 1934
- Ischiopsopha uhligi Allard, 1995
- Ischiopsopha uliasica Krikken, 1983
- Ischiopsopha utakwa Krikken, 1983
- Ischiopsopha vicina Moser, 1908
- Ischiopsopha violacea Janson, 1917
- Ischiopsopha wallacei (J. Thomson, 1857)
- Ischiopsopha wallisiana (J. Thomson, 1860)
- Ischiopsopha willemsteini Allard, 1995
- Ischiopsopha yapasbouf Rigout, 1997

The details of the paramers have been published in the volume 24 of The Beetles of the World, together with a general distribution map.
