= Fish in Australia =

More than 5,000 species of fish inhabit Australia's waterways; of these, 24% are endemic. However, because of the relative scarcity of freshwater waterways, Australia has only about 300 species of freshwater fish. Two families of freshwater fish have ancient origins: the arowana or bonytongues, and the Queensland lungfish. The Queensland lungfish is the most primitive of the lungfish, having evolved before Australia separated from Gondwana. One of the smallest freshwater fish, peculiar to the southwest of Western Australia, is the salamanderfish, which can survive desiccation in the dry season by burrowing into mud. Other families with a potentially Gondwanan origin include the Retropinnidae, Galaxiidae, Aplochitonidae and Percichthyidae. Apart from the ancient freshwater species, 70% of Australia's freshwater fish have affinities with tropical Indo-Pacific marine species that have adapted to freshwater. These species include freshwater lampreys, Herrings, catfish, rainbowfish, and some 50 species of gudgeon, including the sleepy cod. Native freshwater game fish include the barramundi, Murray cod, and golden perch. Two species of endangered freshwater shark are found in the Northern Territory.

Most of Australia's fish species are marine, and 75% live in tropical marine environments. This is partly due to Australia's huge marine territory, covering 9 million km^{2}. Groups of interest include the moray eels and squirrelfish, as well as the pipefish and seahorses, whose males incubate their partner's eggs in a specialised pouch. There are 80 species of grouper in Australian waters, including one of the world's biggest bony fish, the giant grouper, which can grow as large as 2.7 m and weigh up to 400 kg. The trevally, a group of 50 species of silver schooling fish, and the snappers are popular species for commercial fishing. The Great Barrier Reef supports a huge variety of small- and medium-sized reef fish, including the damselfish, butterflyfish, angelfish, gobies, cardinalfish, wrassees, triggerfish and surgeonfish. There are several venomous fish, among them several species of stonefish and pufferfish and the red lionfish, all of which have toxins that can kill humans. There are 11 venomous species of stingray, the largest of which is the smooth stingray. The barracudas are one of the reef's largest species. However, large reef fish should not be eaten for fear of ciguatera poisoning.

Sharks inhabit all the coastal waters and estuarine habitats of Australia's coast. There are 166 species, including 30 species of requiem shark, 32 of catshark, six of wobbegong shark, and 40 of dogfish shark. There are three species from the family Heterodontidae: the Port Jackson shark, the zebra bullhead shark and the crested bullhead shark. In 2004, there were 12 unprovoked shark attacks in Australia, of which two were fatal. Only 3 species of shark pose a significant threat to humans: the bull shark, the tiger shark and the great white shark. Some popular beaches in Queensland and New South Wales are protected by shark netting, a method that has reduced the population of both dangerous and harmless shark species through accidental entanglement.The overfishing of sharks has also significantly reduced shark numbers in Australian waters, and several species are now endangered. A megamouth shark was found on a Perth beach in 1988; very little is known about this species, but this discovery may indicate the presence of the species in Australian coastal waters.

== Species of freshwater fish ==
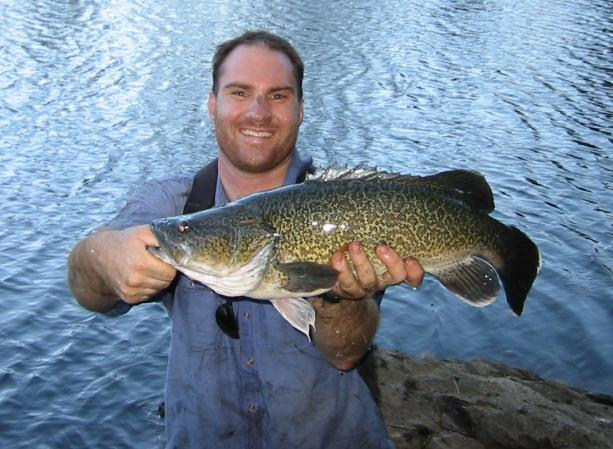
A Murray cod

For its land-size, Australia has a low diversity of native freshwater fish with only 281 described species. This is largely because Australia is a very dry continent with sporadic rainfall and large areas of desert. There is a higher diversity of salt water fish.

Several exotic freshwater fish species, including brown, brook and rainbow trout, Atlantic and Chinook salmon, redfin perch, common carp, and mosquitofish, have been introduced to Australian waterways. The mosquitofish is a particularly aggressive species known for harassing and nipping the fins of other fish. It has been linked to declines and localised extirpations of several small native fish species. The introduced trout species have had serious negative impacts on a number of upland native fish species including trout cod, Macquarie perch and mountain galaxias species as well as other upland fauna such as the spotted tree frog. The common carp is strongly implicated in the dramatic loss in waterweed, decline of small native fish species and permanently elevated levels of turbidity in the Murray-Darling Basin of south west Australia.

The most common freshwater fish are:

- Murray cod
- Australian bass
- Australian grayling
- Australian smelt
- Climbing galaxias
- Common galaxias
- Eastern freshwater cod
- Eel-tailed catfish
- Estuary perch
- Flathead galaxias
- Golden perch
- Halfbeak/Garfish
- Jardini
- Inanga
- Macquarie perch
- Mary River cod
- Mountain galaxias
- Queensland lungfish
- Rainbowfish
- Retropinnidae
- River blackfish
- Saratoga
- Salamanderfish
- Short-finned eel
- Sleepy cod
- Trout cod
- Two-spined blackfish
- Western carp gudgeon

== Marine fish ==
Abelites

- Starry triggerfish
- Abelites stellates

Ablabys

- Ablabys taenianotus

Ablennes

- Flat needlefish
