= Blackfish =

Blackfish is a common name for various species of fishes and cetaceans, including:

== Fish ==
- Alaska blackfish (Dallia pectoralis), an esocid from Alaska, Siberia, and the Bering Sea islands
- Black fish (Carassioides acuminatus), a cyprinid from China and Vietnam
- Black ruff (Centrolophus niger)
- Black sea bass (Centropristis striata)
- Black triggerfish
- Cornish blackfish (Schedophilus medusophagus)
- Gadopsis, two Australian freshwater fish:
  - River blackfish (G. marmoratus)
  - Two-spined blackfish (G. bispinosus)
- Galjoen (Dichistius capensis)
- Imperial blackfish (Schedophilus ovalis)
- Japanese black porgy (Acanthopagrus schlegelii), a large sea bream often cultivated in aquaculture
- Parore (Girella tricuspidata)
- Sacramento blackfish (Orthodon microlepidotus)
- Tautog (Tautoga onitis)

== Dolphins ==
- Pilot whales (Globicephala)
- Melon-headed whale (Peponocephala electra)
- False killer whale (Pseudorca crassidens)
- Pygmy killer whale (Feresa attenuata)
- Orca (Orcinus orca)
