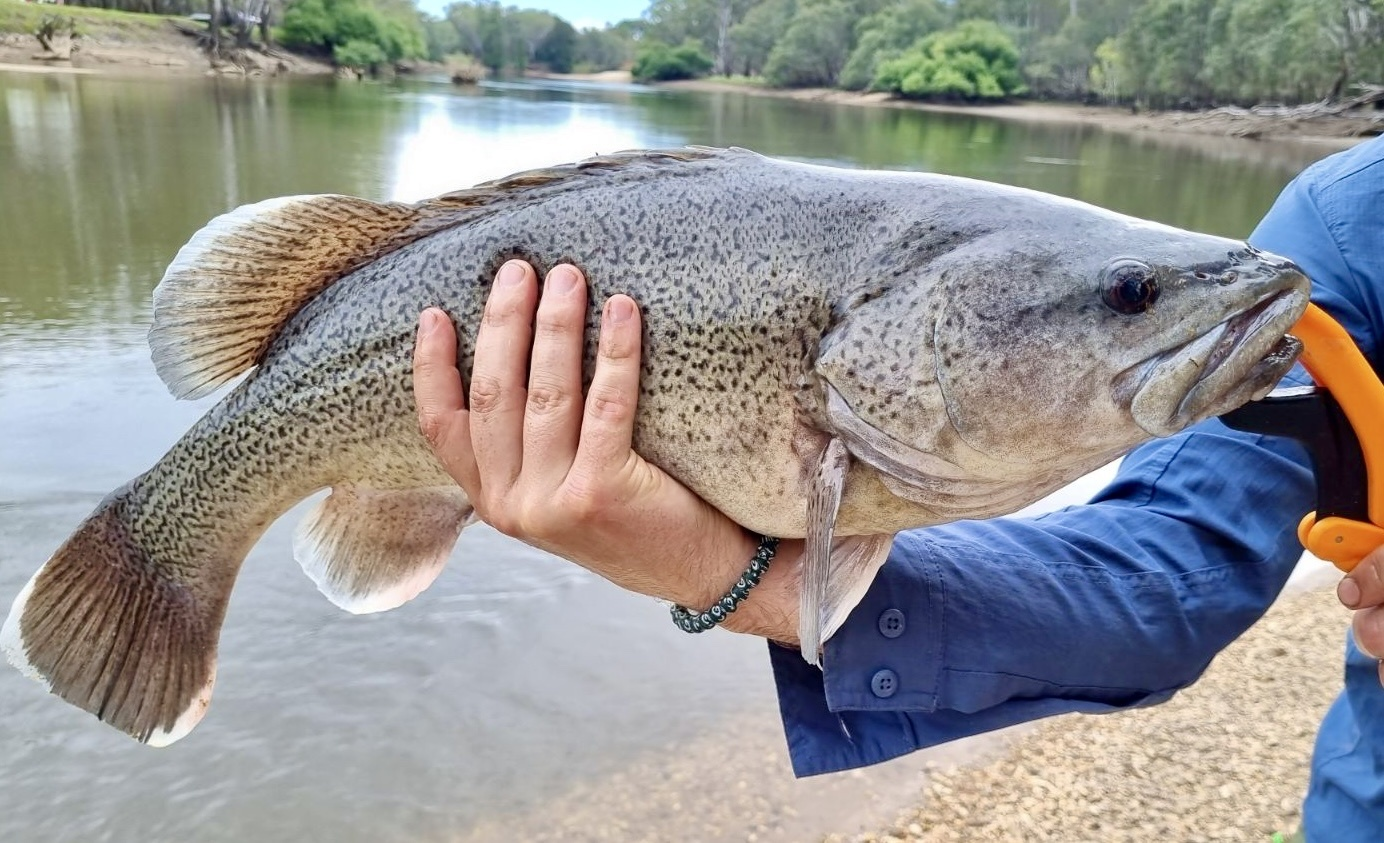

Conservation status
- Vulnerable (IUCN 3.1)

Scientific classification
- Kingdom: Animalia
- Phylum: Chordata
- Class: Actinopterygii
- Order: Centrarchiformes
- Family: Percichthyidae
- Genus: Maccullochella
- Species: M. macquariensis

Binomial name
- Maccullochella macquariensis (G. Cuvier, 1829)

Synonyms
- Grystes macquariensis G. Cuvier, 1829; Grystes brisbani Lesson, 1831; Oligorus mitchelii Castelnau, 1873; Oligorus gibbiceps W. J. Macleay, 1885

= Trout cod =

Trout cod Temporal range: Pliocene - Recent

Species of fish

The trout cod (Maccullochella macquariensis) or bluenose cod, is a large predatory freshwater fish of the genus Maccullochella and the family Percichthyidae, closely related to the Murray cod. It was originally widespread in the south-east corner of the Murray-Darling river system in Australia, but is now an endangered species.

In the 19th and early 20th centuries, when trout cod were widely recognised as a separate species by commercial fishermen, recreational fishermen, riverside residents and fisheries scientists, they were generally known as bluenose cod or simply bluenose, particularly in Victoria. In some parts of New South Wales however they were also known as trout cod, and this common name was adopted when the species status of the fish was finally confirmed by genetic studies in the early 1970s. This choice of official common name was perhaps unfortunate; it has been suggested that bluenose cod is a more appropriate name as the name trout cod causes confusion amongst the Australian public. (Trout cod are an Australian native freshwater fish; they are not a hybrid between Murray cod and introduced trout species.)

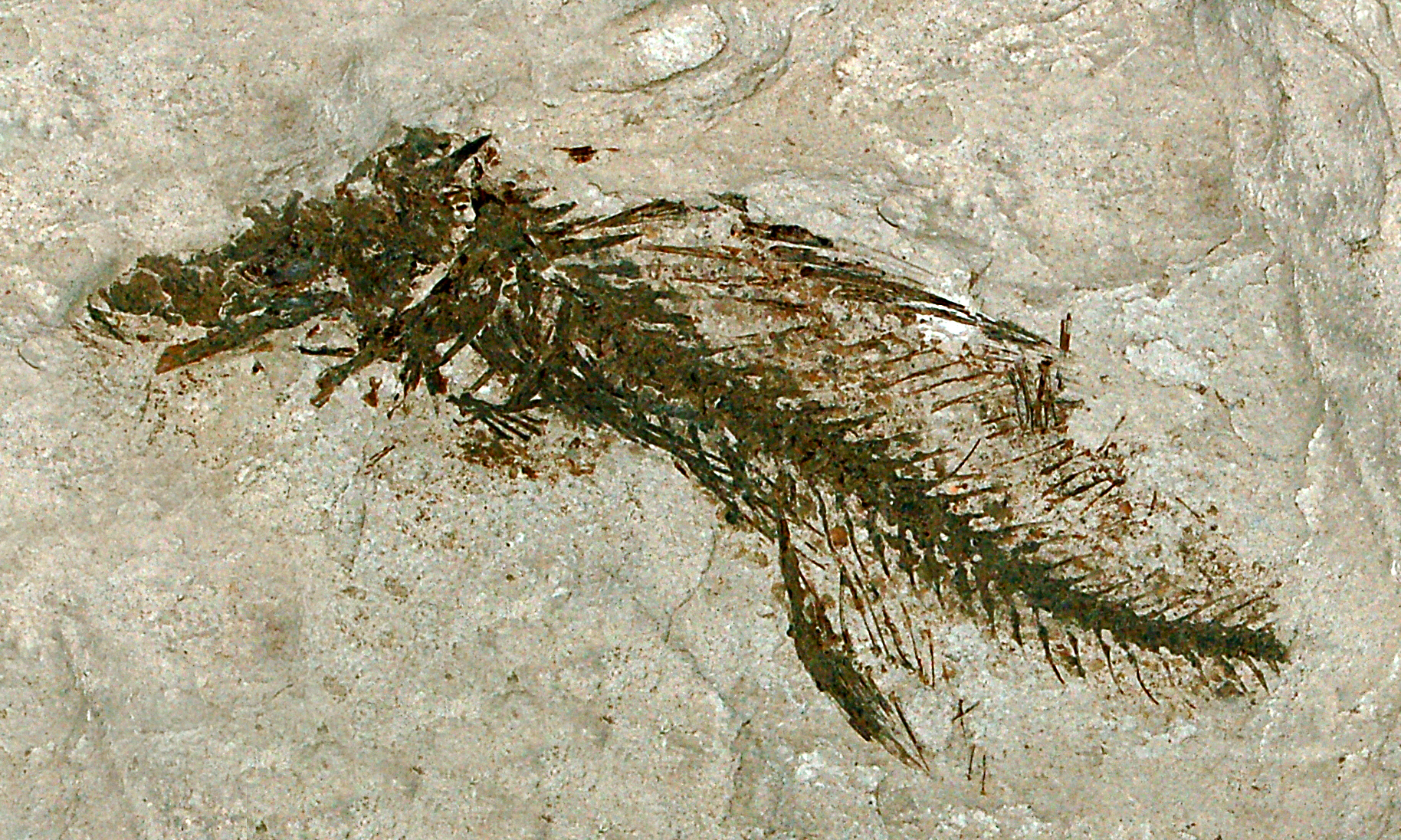
Fossil of Maccullochella macquariensis, Lower Pliocene, Australia

Trout cod are a listed species on a number of different registers including Endangered under the New South Wales Fisheries Management Act 1994, the Australian Commonwealth's Environment Protection and Biodiversity Conservation Act 1999, the Australian Capital Territory's Nature Conservation Act 1980 and by the World Conservation Union (IUCN). They are also listed as Threatened under the Victorian Flora and Fauna Guarantee Act 1998.

Fossils of genus Maccullochella can be found from Miocene epoch (from about 23.03 to 5.332 million years ago) to recent age, while the species Maccullochella macquariensis is present from Lower Pliocene (3.6–5.3 mya) to recent age.

== Description ==
Trout cod have been reliably recorded to at least 80 cm and 16 kg, but there are some credible anecdotal accounts of larger specimens.

Trout cod are broadly similar to the Murray cod, however there are some distinct differences in morphology and colouration.

Trout cod are a small to medium groper-like fish with a deep, elongated body that is round in cross section. In contrast to Murray cod, trout cod have a pointed head with the top jaw overhanging the bottom jaw, and the slope of the head is straight. The eyes are slightly larger and more prominent than in Murray cod. The head tends to be free of speckling however a distinct dark stripe through the eye is usually present.

Trout cod are cream to light grey on their ventral ("belly") surfaces. Their back and flanks are most commonly bluish-grey in colour, overlain with irregular black speckling, but this can be highly variable depending on the habitat specimens come from, and can range from almost white to light grey-green, light brown, dark brown or almost black. The black speckling on the back and flanks is consistent however.

The spiny dorsal fin is moderate in height and is partially separated by a notch from the high, rounded soft dorsal fin. Soft dorsal, anal and caudal (tail) fins are all large and rounded, and are light grey to dark grey or black with distinct white edges. The large, rounded pectoral fins are usually similar in colour to flanks. The pelvic fins are large and angular and set forward of the pectoral fins. The leading white-coloured rays on the pelvic fins split into two trailing white filaments, while the pelvic fins themselves are usually a translucent cream or light grey.

Smaller trout cod tend to be more slender than equivalent sized Murray cod; curiously, very large trout cod appear to develop deeper shoulders than equivalent sized Murray cod.

While trout cod were only conclusively described as a separate species to Murray cod in 1972, commercial and recreational fishermen and early fishery biologists were in no doubt that there were two separate species of cod in the Murray-Darling system from the 1850s onwards, and noted the trout cod's different appearance and spawning biology and preference for cooler, faster flowing water and upland habitats. During the 19th and early 20th centuries trout cod were recognised by the scientific community as separate species, due to differing habitat preferences, morphological differences (especially the much smaller size at sexual maturity) and differing spawning times. It was really only post World War II — by which time trout cod had become very rare or even extinct in much of their original range — that the erroneous idea that they were really just anomalous Murray cod gained any currency.

== Habitat ==
Although there is/was a very substantial overlap in range, trout cod are essentially a more specialised upland sister species to Murray cod. Therefore, the trout cod's main habitats were the larger upland rivers and creeks, which they usually co-inhabited with Macquarie perch and one or both of the blackfish species. Historical research is confirming a primarily upland distribution for trout cod; recent governmental literature lacking such historical research and suggesting trout cod are primarily a lowland fish species must be considered inaccurate.

Division into specialist upland and primarily lowland species is a relatively common phenomena in native fish genera of the Murray-Darling and East Coast systems with other notable pairs shown in the following table:

Upland	Lowland
Macquarie perch, Macquaria australasica	Golden perch, Macquaria ambigua
Australian bass, Macquaria novemaculeata	Estuary perch, Macquaria colonorum
Two-spined blackfish, Gadopsis bispinosis	River blackfish, Gadopsis marmoratus
Mountain galaxias species complex, Galaxias spp.	Flathead galaxias, Galaxias rostratus

Trout cod are often found close to cover and in faster currents and in cooler waters than Murray cod. Their diet is essentially the same as Murray cod with adjustment made for size, eating mainly other fishes, freshwater mussels, crustaceans, aquatic insects, small mammals and water fowl. However, recent anecdotal evidence suggests terrestrial insects made up a significant proportion of the trout cod's diet in upland rivers and streams.

In the surviving Murray River population trout cod tend to stick to areas of deep water near banks, around snags, rocks or other large structure. However, historical accounts of trout cod in upland river habitats stated that trout cod were often found in shallow riffles and runs. Generally speaking, radio-tracked trout cod in the surviving Murray River population have small home ranges and may be a species which does not move away from their original base, except during the breeding season when they follow a common trend in Murray-Darling fish of migrating upstream prior to spawning. It seems likely that trout cod follow a similar pattern to Murray cod and return post spawning to their original location.

== Diet ==
Trout cod are carnivores and feed on other fish, crustaceans (such as crayfish, yabbies and freshwater shrimp) as well as aquatic and terrestrial insects. Larvae are pelagic fish and eat zooplankton.

== Reproduction ==
Trout cod reach sexual maturity at 3 to 5 years (which corresponds to about 35 cm in males and 43 cm in females). Trout cod reach sexual maturity at a smaller size than Murray cod, which is an adaptation to the rocky, low nutrient and often quite small upland habitats trout cod were found in. Spawning of trout cod has never been observed in the wild and is not well understood. It is believed to be essentially the same as Murray cod but occurs about three weeks earlier and at significantly lower temperatures in waters shared by the two species. Trout cod are believed to spawn at temperatures as low as 15 degrees in upland rivers, using rocks as a spawning substrate; these are also clear adaptations to cool, rocky upland river habitats. Significantly, and unlike Murray cod, trout cod will not breed in earthen dam brood ponds; another indication that trout cod are a more specialised upland species than Murray cod. Artificial breeding programs being conducted for the species recovery use hormone injections to induce ovulation in naturally ripe fish in spring. Trout cod will hybridise with Murray cod and so for recovery projects it is important that Murray cod are not stocked into sites where Trout Cod and Murray cod are not already coexisting sympatrically.

== Conservation ==
Trout cod were once common and abundant throughout the Murray-Darling Basin but are now listed on the IUCN as endangered due to overfishing, degradation of habitat and the introduction of invasive Trout species. The species is now totally protected. Only one wild, naturally occurring trout cod population remains in the Murray River in a region where the river is basically an extended transition zone from upland river habitat to lowland river habitat.

In more lowland river habitats, river regulation and habitat degradation through activities like de-snagging, and overfishing, are probably the primary causes of decline. Heavy predation by introduced redfin perch, which were present in great numbers in the lowland reaches of the southern MDB for several decades, also played a large role in the decline of native fish in those reaches including trout cod. The possibility that trout cod populations in upland habitats were the ultimate source of trout cod populations in lowland habitats (i.e. source and sink populations) over long time frames (i.e. decades) cannot be discounted however. Historical accounts such as those from J.O.Langtry indicate lowland trout cod populations were secondary populations in secondary habitats, clearly in the minority to more abundant primarily lowland native fish species such as Murray cod, golden perch and silver perch. Therefore, it is doubtful whether strong trout cod populations can ever be established in lowland habitats, and therefore the issue of upland habitats, and the return of some upland habitats in trout-free form, needs to be addressed in trout cod conservation.

Historical evidence indicates trout cod (and Macquarie perch) were abundant in most of the larger upland rivers and streams in the south-east corner of the Murray-Darling river system, and that these upland river habitats were their primary habitats. The extinction of trout cod populations in every one of its upland river habitats is an unresolved issue. Contrary to popular belief, many of these upland rivers still contain significant stretches of unregulated, high quality habitat. While dams, thermal pollution, siltation and other forms of habitat modification and degradation are responsible for the trout cod's extinction in many upland river habitats, it is almost certain that the reason for the trout cod's extinction in higher quality upland river habitats, that have not experienced serious modification and degradation, is the heavy domination of these habitats by introduced trout species, which are aggressive, predatory fish.

Every single larger upland river and stream in south-eastern Australia is dominated by introduced trout species (rainbow trout and brown trout), with many having been continually stocked with introduced trout species for more than a century, and not a single larger upland river or stream in south-eastern Australia has been reserved in a trout-free state for larger upland native fish species. The effects of this course of action by fishery departments has been stark, and catastrophic events such as drought or bushfire, after which introduced trout species were restocked but upland native fish were not restocked, have shifted the balance further. The net result is that a number of upland native fish species including trout cod (and Macquarie perch) have completely died out or nearly so in their upland river habitats in the wild, apparently unable to cope with massive predation on their larvae/juveniles by introduced trout species and unable to cope with massive competition from introduced trout species for food and habitat at all life stages.

I regret not knowing the name of a man I met at Tom Groggin Station, a Victorian property on the Indi River near Mt Kosciusko, who told me that he worked at Tom Groggin before he enlisted in the army and went to the first World War. He had fished the Indi before he left and it carried a great number of blue nose [trout cod], white eye [Macquarie perch] and greasies [blackfish]. While he was at war, he even dreamt about fishing the Indi. When he came home he returned to his old job at Tom Groggin and announced that before he did any work, he wanted to go fishing. Very quickly he caught a fish about a foot (30cm) in length, the like of which he had never seen before. So intrigued was he by this strange spotted but nicely shaped fish that he immediately took it to the homestead thinking it was something quite unique. At the homestead, he was told it was a brown trout. From that time both the white eye [Macquarie perch] and the blue nose [trout cod] numbers went into decline, while the numbers of brown and rainbow trout increased. To my mind, this man did do something remarkable, he had set a very positive timeframe of a change over of fish species in the Indi River.

Heads and Tales: Recollections of a Fisheries and Wildlife Officer.

Scientific studies to document and quantify the impacts of introduced trout on trout cod (and Macquarie perch) in upland river habitats, and develop a more scientific approach to trout cod conservation and re-establishment efforts, including in upland river habitats, are desperately needed. Given the strong cultural cringe towards introduced trout in the wider community and the management bias towards introduced trout amongst fishery agencies these studies may be some way off.

Two small populations of trout cod that have shown indications of breeding have been created by hatchery stockings in the lowland reaches of Murrumbidgee River at Gundagai and Narranderra, although it is far from clear whether these populations will be self-sustaining in the long term. Many other stockings of trout cod have failed, which is not surprisingly considering the small number of trout cod fingerlings stocked, and the fact that trout cod were frequently stocked into upland river habitats where introduced trout species were heavily entrenched, and in at least one case, were carried in conjunction with far larger stockings of introduced trout. A semi-natural population exists in a stretch of the very small upland Seven Creeks, which was established by translocations of trout cod (and Macquarie perch) above a set of falls in the 1920s. The Seven Creeks population is not a wholly artificial population, or a wholly unrepresentative habitat, as often claimed, as some of the trout cod translocated came — literally — from the base of the falls.
