= Balston =

Balston may refer to:

- Thomas Balston (1883–1967), member of the Whatman paper-making family
- Edward Balston (1817–1891), English schoolmaster
- Nannatherina balstoni, also known as Balston's pygmy perch
