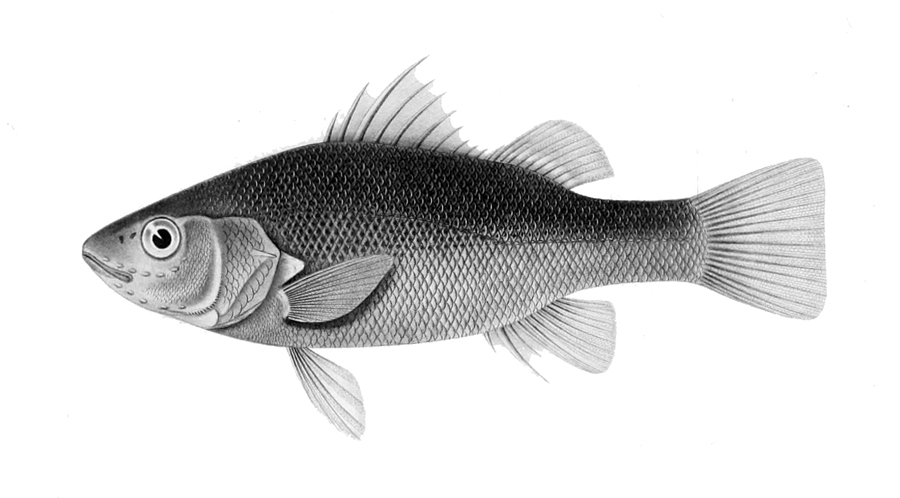

Conservation status
- Critically Endangered (IUCN 3.1)

Scientific classification
- Kingdom: Animalia
- Phylum: Chordata
- Class: Actinopterygii
- Order: Centrarchiformes
- Family: Percichthyidae
- Genus: Percichthys
- Species: P. melanops

Binomial name
- Percichthys melanops Girard, 1855

= Percichthys melanops =

Species of ray-finned fish

Percichthys melanops is a species of temperate perch endemic to Chile, where it occurs in pre-Andean streams. This species can reach 20 cm (7.9 in) TL.

P. melanops was classified as an endangered species of Chile by Campos et al. (1998). It is listed as critically endangered by the International Union for Conservation of Nature due to a presumed range-wide population decline of 90% between 2011 and 2021. It is considered to be extirpated from the Aconcagua River basin. Threats to the continued existence of this sensitive species include rapid human development of watersheds and river courses and droughts associated with climate change.
