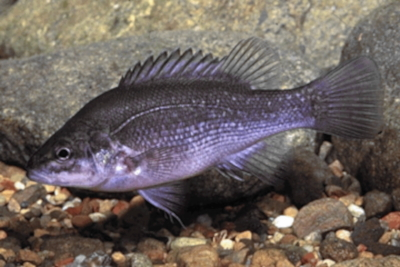

Conservation status
- Vulnerable (IUCN 3.1)

Scientific classification
- Kingdom: Animalia
- Phylum: Chordata
- Class: Actinopterygii
- Order: Centrarchiformes
- Family: Percichthyidae
- Genus: Macquaria
- Species: M. wujalwujalensis

Binomial name
- Macquaria wujalwujalensis (Pusey & M. J. Kennard, 2001)

Synonyms
- Guyu wujalwujalensis Pusey & Kennard, 2001

= Bloomfield River cod =

Species of fish

The Bloomfield River cod (Macquaria wujalwujalensis) or the tropical nightfish, is a species of temperate perch endemic to Australia. It is only found in an 11-km stretch of the Bloomfield River (between two large waterfalls) in the Daintree Rainforest of northern Queensland. These waterfalls appear to have blocked the migration of more aggressive tropical freshwater fish species such as the sooty grunter (Hephaestus fuliginosus) that have presumably naturally displaced the Bloomfield River cod from its former range in prehistoric times. With its very limited distribution, the Bloomfield River cod is clearly a relict species. It is a very important relict species, however, as it is the most northerly distributed percichthyid species in Australia and raises interesting questions on the biogeography of percichthyid fish in Australia and the history of their ancient colonisation of Australian rivers.

== Discovery ==
The species was discovered in 1993 by Mark Kennard and Brad Pusey of the Australian Rivers Institute at Griffith University.

== Etymology ==
The species name wujalwujalensis comes from the Wujal Wujal Aboriginal community on the Bloomfield River, and the genus name Guyu comes from the tribe's name for this fish. Bloomfield River cod are the only species in the genus Guyu.

== Description ==
Though named after the Australian freshwater cod species that are the most famous members of the family Percichthyidae (e.g. Murray cod), the Bloomfield River cod has little resemblance to the cod species. In fact, it is very similar in shape and appearance to a juvenile golden perch in a gold/light bronze colouration. It can reach a length of 10.1 cm (4.0 in) SL. Despite its small size, it is slow-growing and long-lived; a 13 cm (5.1 in) individual was estimated to be 15 years old.

== Threats ==
Introduced threats (as competitors or potential predators) to the Bloomfield River cod include the Tully Grunter, which may have been introduced by recreational fishers; native eel-tailed catfish and South American guppies may have been released by aquarium enthusiasts.

== Conservation ==
Attempts at captive breeding have been unsuccessful.

In November 2024, an expert committee of the Biodiversity Council (a consortium of 11 Australian universities) recommended that the Bloomfield River cod be listed under the federal government's EPBC Act.
