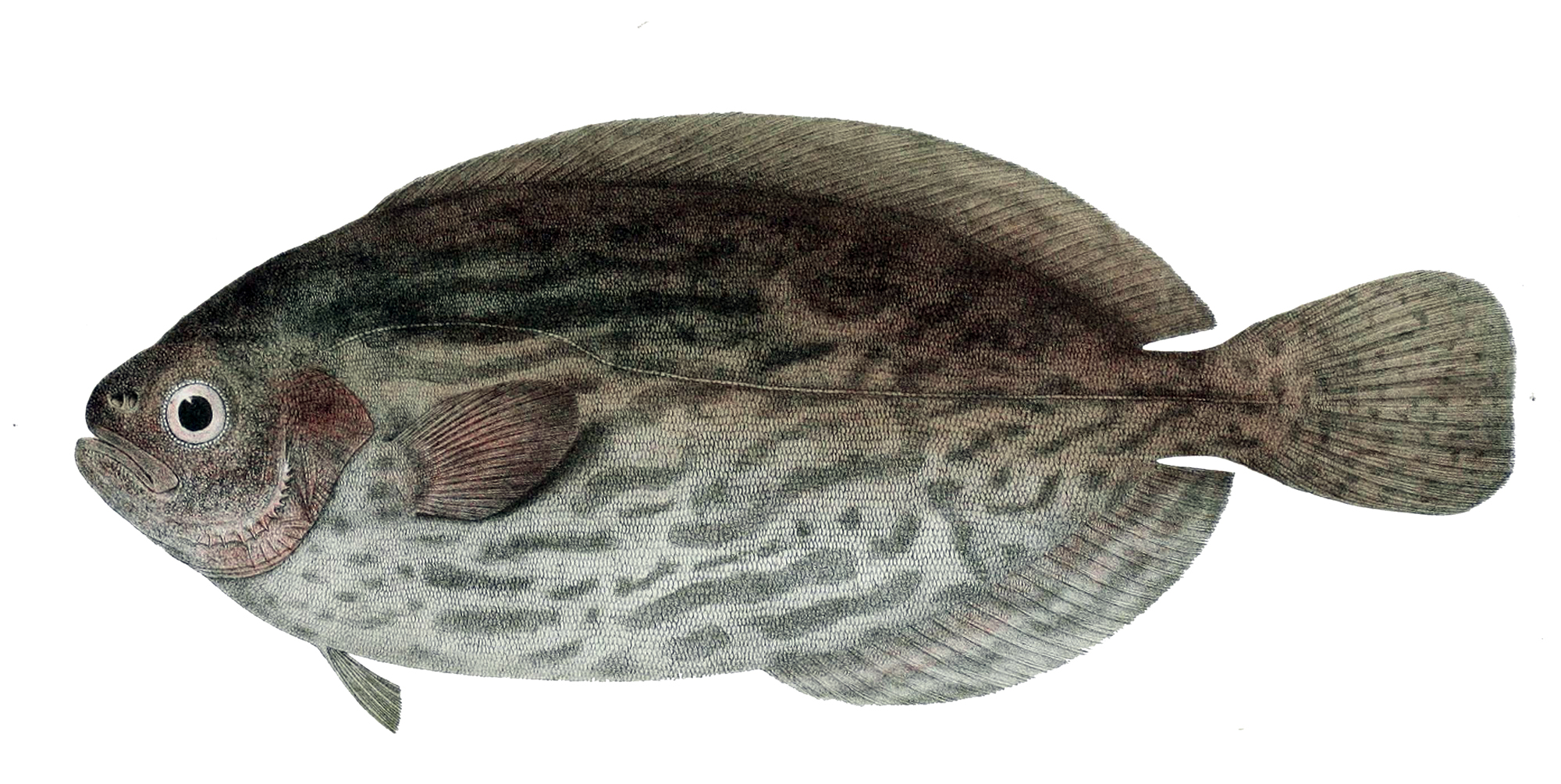
- Cornish Blackfish (S. medusophagus)

Scientific classification
- Kingdom: Animalia
- Phylum: Chordata
- Class: Actinopterygii
- Order: Scombriformes
- Family: Centrolophidae
- Genus: Schedophilus; Cocco, 1839

Type species
- Centrolophus medusophagus Cocco, 1839

Synonyms
- Coroplopus J. L. B. Smith, 1966; Crius Valenciennes, 1839; Eucrotus Bean, 1912; Hoplocoryphis Gill, 1862; Leirus Lowe, 1834; Mupus Cocco, 1840; Tubbia Whitley, 1943

= Schedophilus =

Genus of ray-finned fishes

Schedophilus is a genus of ray-finned fish in the family Centrolophidae, the medusafish. The genus has a global distribution.

== Species ==
There are currently eight recognized species in this genus:

- Schedophilus griseolineatus (Norman, 1937)
- Schedophilus haedrichi Chirichigno F., 1973 (Mocosa ruff)
- Schedophilus huttoni (Waite, 1910) (New Zealand ruffe)
- Schedophilus maculatus Günther, 1860 (Pelagic butterfish)
- Schedophilus medusophagus (Cocco, 1839) (Cornish blackfish)
- Schedophilus ovalis (G. Cuvier, 1833) (Imperial blackfish)
- Schedophilus pemarco (Poll, 1959) (Pemarco blackfish)
- Schedophilus velaini (Sauvage, 1879) (African barrelfish)
