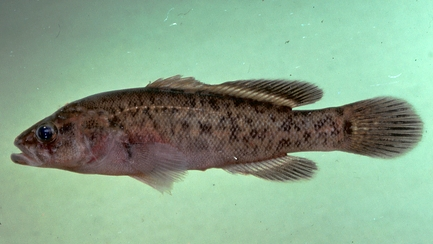

Conservation status
- Near Threatened (IUCN 3.1)

Scientific classification
- Kingdom: Animalia
- Phylum: Chordata
- Class: Actinopterygii
- Division: Teleostei
- Order: Centrarchiformes
- Family: Percichthyidae
- Genus: Bostockia; Castelnau, 1873
- Species: B. porosa

Binomial name
- Bostockia porosa Castelnau, 1873

Synonyms
- Bostockia hemigramma J. D. Ogilby, 1899

= Nightfish =

Species of fish

The nightfish (Bostockia porosa) is a species of freshwater ray-finned fish, a temperate perch from the family Percichthyidae which is endemic to southwestern Australia.

== Taxonomy ==
The nightfish was first formally described in 1873 by the French naturalist François-Louis Laporte, comte de Castelnau. The type locality was given as the Cygnes River in the interior of Western Australia. Castelnau also described the new monotypic genus Bostockia for this new species. The is genus is classified within the family Percichthyidae, the temperate perches. The genus name honours the Anglican minister Rev. George James Bostock (1833-1881), a collector of fish specimens for Castelnau in Western Australia, he collected the nightfish type. The specific name porosus means "holed" or "pored", an allusion to the pores around the head.

== Description ==
The nightfish has an oblong and compressed body with a large, oblique mouth which has a slightly protruding lower jaw and which reached beyond the rear edge of the pupil. Both jaws and the roof of the mouth have bands of villiform teeth. It has an incomplete lateral line which has 43-47 tubed scales. There are large obvious open pores around each eye and along the upper part of head and along the jaws. The gill cover ends in a double spine. The dorsal fin contains 7 or 8 spines, spines 3 and 4 being the longest, and 16-17 soft rays, the spiny and soft-rated parts separated by a deep notch. The anal fin has 3 spines and 11-12 soft rays. The anal and caudal fins are rounded. It is normally deep olive purple to black or dark-brown but can be light-brown with a dark brown mottling when living in lighter environments. The maximum recorded standard length is 15 centimetres (5.9 in), although most fish are around 9 centimetres (3.5 in).

== Distribution ==
The nightfish is endemic to the coastal wetlands of Southwest Australia. It is common and is found between the Hill River, near Jurien Bay and the Kalgan River near Albany.

== Habitat and biology ==
The nightfish is found in coastal streams, lakes and ponds where they occur in both clear and dark water, with the latter darkened by tannins. They prefer to be in the vicinity of the cover of rocks, macrophytes or submerged wood. During the day they hide beneath stones or among vegetation. The adults remain hidden in the daylight hours and emerge to feed at night while the juveniles are more diurnal. Males attain sexual maturity after a year and females after two years, when the water levels rise in the winter rains in August and September they migrate upstream to headwaters and tributaries to breed. Each female can lay 230 to 1138 eggs. This is a carnivorous species which feeds on a variety benthic invertebrates, especially ostracods and fly larvae. They have a lifespan of 6 years.

== Conservation ==
The nightfish is only found in southwestern Australia. Although it occurs widely there, the area it occupies is only 501 km^{2} (193 sq mi). It is threatened by invasive species, especially the Eastern mosquitofish (Gambusia holbrooki), which nip at their fins, and rainbow trout (Oncorhynchus mykiss) and European perch (Perca fluviatilis) which predate on it. It is also threatened by climate change which has caused the drying of habitats, secondary salinisation of rivers and the reductuion in the amount of available water on the Swan Coastal Plain The IUCN has assessed this species as Near Threatened.
