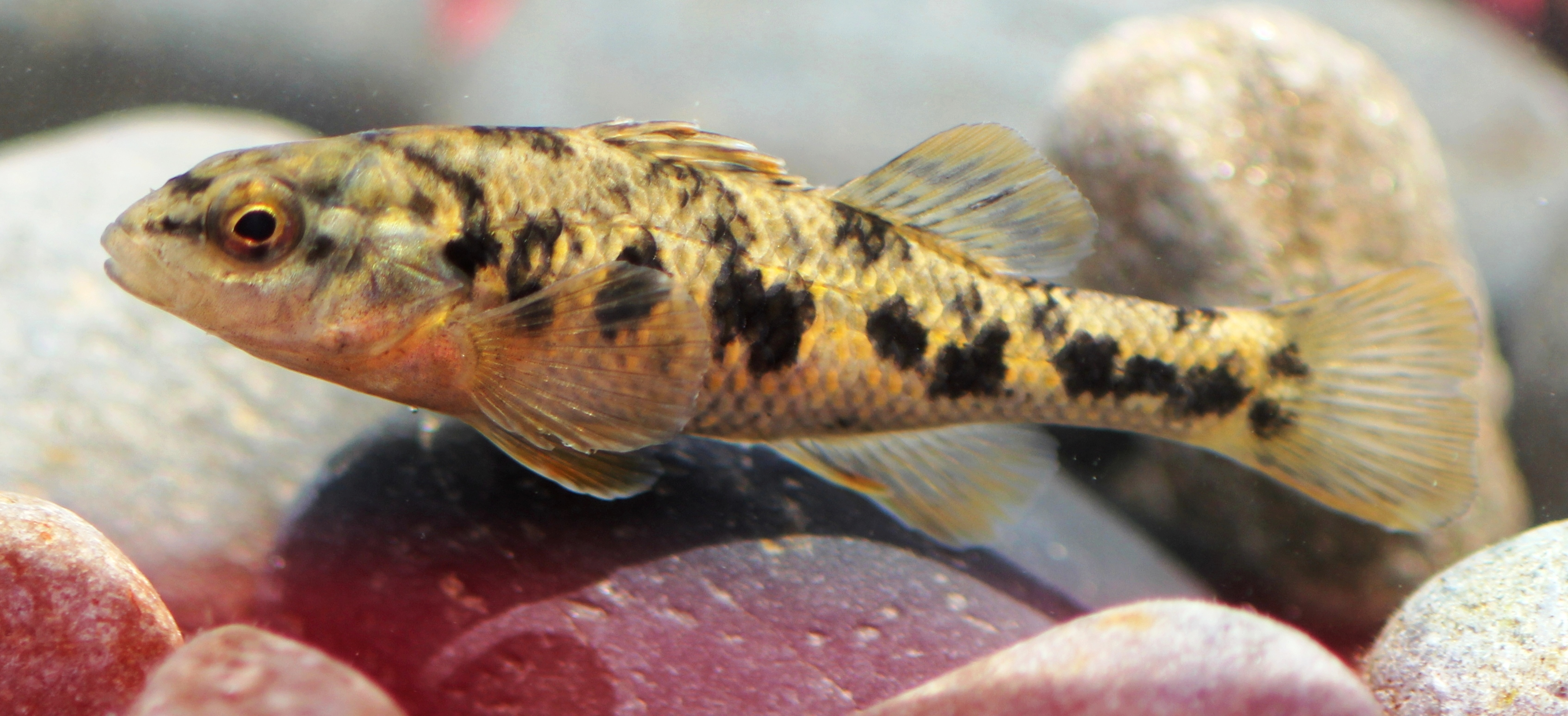

Conservation status
- Data Deficient (IUCN 2.3)

Scientific classification
- Kingdom: Animalia
- Phylum: Chordata
- Class: Actinopterygii
- Division: Teleostei
- Order: Centrarchiformes
- Family: Perciliidae
- Genus: Percilia
- Species: P. gillissi

Binomial name
- Percilia gillissi Girard, 1855

Synonyms
- Percilia gracilis Philippi, 1866

= Percilia gillissi =

Species of ray-finned fish

Percilia gillissi, known as carmelita in Spanish, is a species of perch-like ray-finned fish in the family Perciliidae found only in central and southern Chile. In Chile it is distributed from the Aconcagua Valley at a latitude of 32°S to the Los Lagos Region at 41°S where it is found in the cool temperatures, high oxygen levels, and fast, turbulent, swift flows of the rithron zone where it feeds on benthic invertebrates. They spawn in the southern spring and summer, starting in October with many juveniles being recorded in mid summer. Most of the juveniles attain maturity before the next summer. It attains a maximum total length of 9 centimetres (3.5 in).
