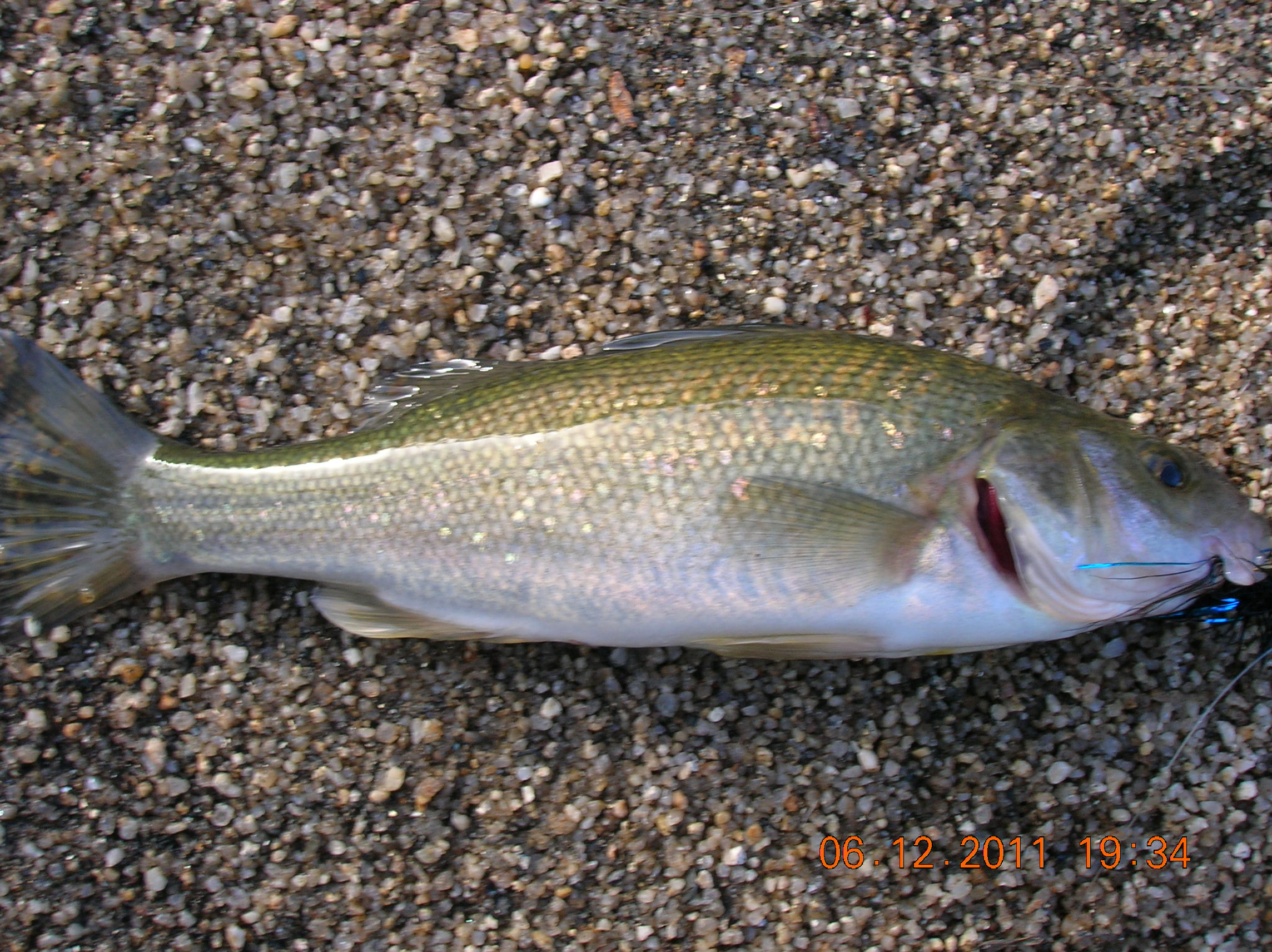
- Percichthys trucha

Scientific classification
- Kingdom: Animalia
- Phylum: Chordata
- Class: Actinopterygii
- Order: Centrarchiformes
- Suborder: Centrarchoidei
- Family: Percichthyidae; D. S. Jordan & C. H. Eigenmann, 1890

Genera
- see text

Synonyms
- Gadopsidae

= Temperate perch =

Temperate perches Temporal range: Early Paleocene–present

Family of fishes

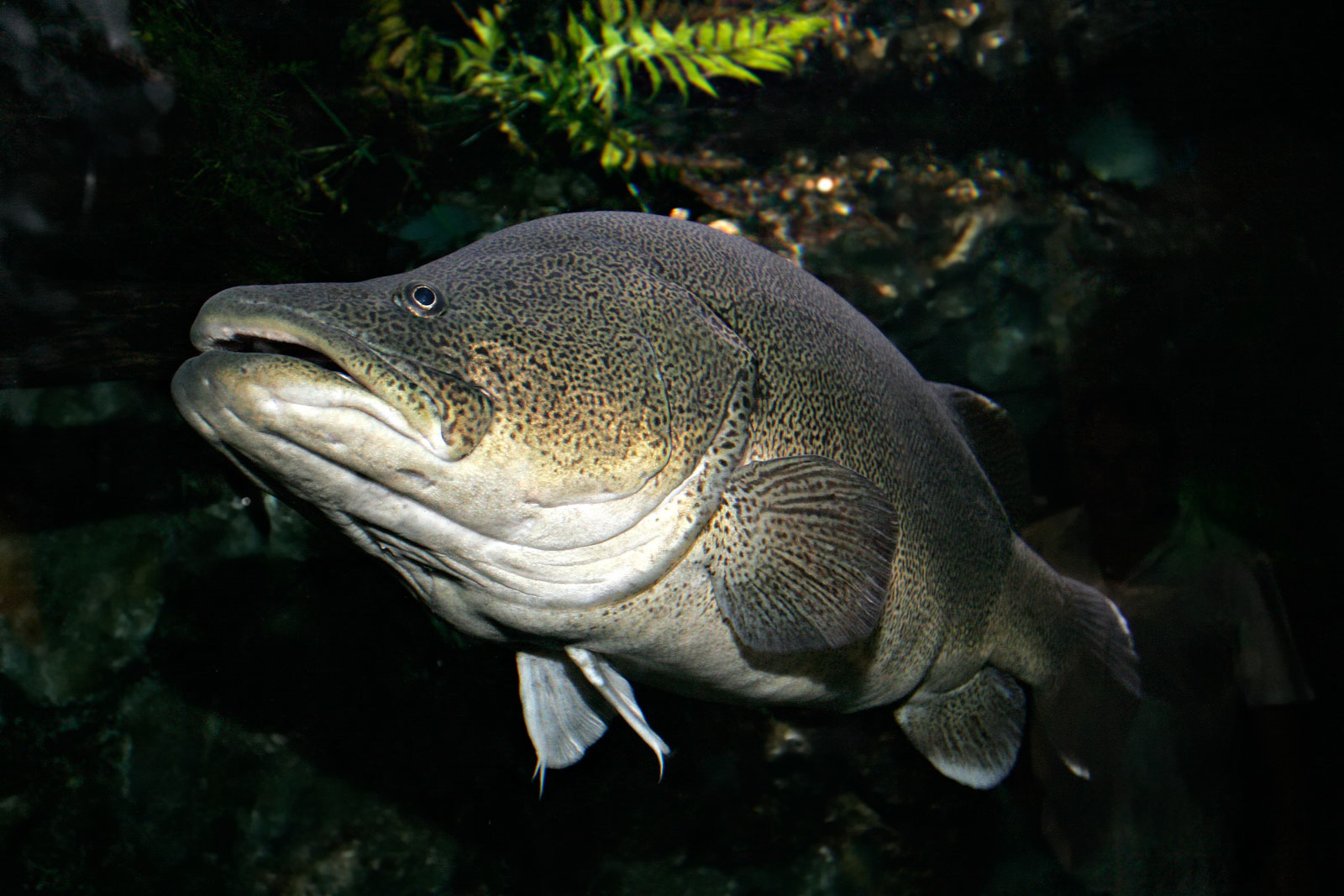
Murray cod (Maccullochella peelii peelii)

Percichthyidae, the temperate perches, are a family of freshwater ray-finned fish found in Australia and southern South America. Formerly placed in the order Perciformes, they are now placed in the order Centrarchiformes.

The name Percichthyidae derives from the Latin perca for perch and Ancient Greek ἰχθύς, ichthys for fish.

== Evolution ==
Potential percichthyid fossil remains are known from the Early Paleocene of the El Molino Formation of Bolivia; these remains have been described as resembling those of the fossil Percichthys hondoensis from the Eocene of Argentina. One articulated specimen is known from the Paleocene portion of the formation, but other remains are known from the Maastrichtian beds of the formation, indicating that percichthyids could have potential Cretaceous origins. However, the condition of this material is unclear. Another fossil percichthyid, Percichthys lonquimayiensis from Chile, was initially dated to the Paleocene, but further studies have found it to be from the Miocene.

Potential percichthyid scales have been recovered from the Miocene-aged fossil deposits of Foulden Maar in New Zealand. If these are of percichthyids, this suggests they had a wider distribution during the Neogene. They also appear to have ranged as far north as the Neotropics during the Oligocene/Miocene, with the fossil genus Santosius known from Brazil.

Modern percichthyids have a significant disjunct distribution, being found in Australia and southern South America. All extant members of the group only inhabit freshwater habitats, and it is thus unlikely they ever evolved marine habits. For this reason, it is likely that the modern distribution of percichthyids derives from dispersal over the Antarctic land bridge between South America and Australia, which existed up to the end of the Eocene. This suggests that percichthyids likely inhabited Antarctica as well.

=== Classification ===
The temperate perches are closely related to the freshwater sunfish of North America, with both belonging to the suborder Centrarchoidei. They were previously also thought to be allied with the temperate basses of the family Moronidae and the seabasses in the family Serranidae, but are now thought to not be closely related.

Almost 40 species of percichthyids are now recognised, grouped in 11–12 genera. Most but not all are exclusively freshwater fishes. They are mainly found in Australia, but species are also found in southern South America (Percichthys).

More recently the Chinese perches have been classified in the separate family Sinipercidae while the genus Percilia has been found not to be closely related to either that family or the Percichthyidae and has been placed in its own monotypic family Perciliidae. The two catadromous species in Percalates are found in Australia and were previously placed in Macquaria, but phylogenetic analyses have found them to be the most basal members of the whole order.

The following 8 genera are classified within the family Percichthyidae:

- Bostockia Castelnau, 1873
- Gadopsis Richardson, 1848
- Guyu Pusey & Kennard, 2001
- Maccullochella Whitley, 1929
- Macquaria Cuvier, 1830
- Nannatherina Regan, 1906
- Nannoperca Günther, 1861
- Percichthys Girard, 1855

In addition, two extinct genera are known exclusively from fossil remains:

- †Plesiopercichthys Agnolin et al., 2014 (Pliocene of Argentina)
- †Santosius Arratia, 1982 (latest Oligocene/earliest Miocene of Brazil)

== Species ==
Australia has the greatest number of percichthyid species, where they are represented by the Australian freshwater cods (Maccullochella spp.), which are Murray cod, Mary River cod, eastern freshwater cod, and trout cod, by the Australian freshwater blackfishes (Gadopsis spp.), which are river blackfish and two-spined blackfish, and by the Australian freshwater perches which are golden perch, Macquarie perch (Macquaria spp.), and Australian bass, and estuary perch (Percalates spp.).

Several other Australian freshwater species also sit within the family Percichthyidae, while research using mitochondrial DNA suggests the species of the family Nannopercidae are in reality percichthyids, as well. Australia is unique in having a freshwater fish fauna dominated by percichthyids and allied families/species. This in contrast to Europe and Asia, whose fish faunas are dominated by members of the Cyprinidae carp family. (Australia does not have a single naturally occurring cyprinid species; unfortunately, the illegal introduction of carp has now established the family's presence in Australia.)

A single genus occurs outside Australia, Percichthys in southern South America.

A number of species are or have been important food species; some of these (e.g. the Murray cod, Maccullochella peelii peelii) have become threatened through overfishing and river regulation, while others are now farmed to some extent. Some smaller species (e.g. Balston's pygmy perch, Nannatherina balstoni) are popular in aquaria.

The extremely rare Bloomfield River cod, Guyu wujalwujalensis, is only found in a short stretch of the Bloomfield River in north Queensland.

== See also ==
- Howella
