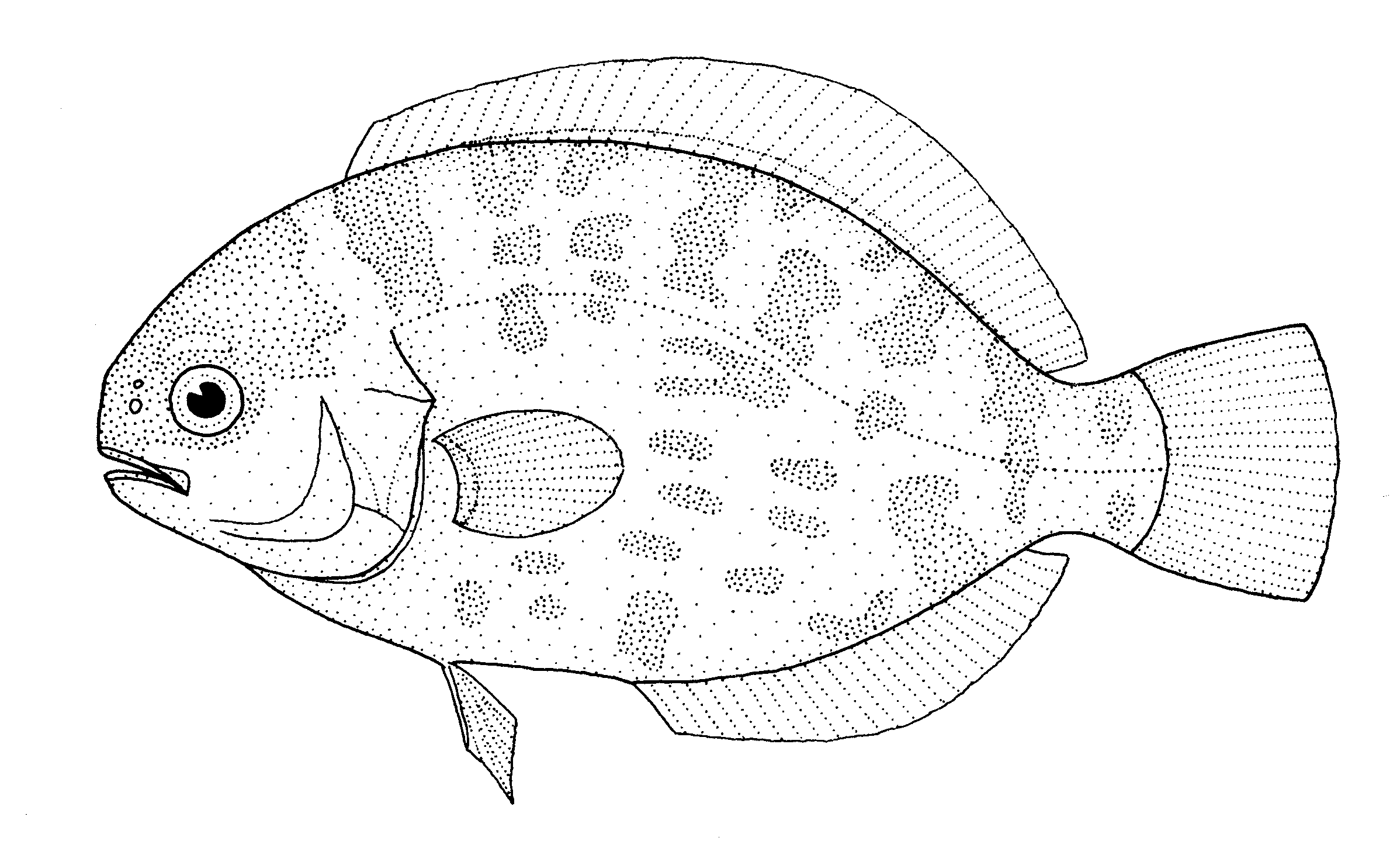
- Drawing by Dr Tony Ayling

Scientific classification
- Domain: Eukaryota
- Kingdom: Animalia
- Phylum: Chordata
- Class: Actinopterygii
- Order: Scombriformes
- Family: Centrolophidae
- Genus: Schedophilus
- Species: S. maculatus

Binomial name
- Schedophilus maculatus Günther, 1860

Synonyms
- Mupus maculatus (Günther, 1860); Seriolella maculata (Günther, 1860); Schedophilus marmoratus Kner & Steindachner, 1867; Hoplocoryphis physaliarum Whitley, 1933

= Pelagic butterfish =

Species of ray-finned fish

The pelagic butterfish, Schedophilus maculatus, is a medusafish of the genus Schedophilus found in all warm oceans. Its length is up to about 30 cm.
