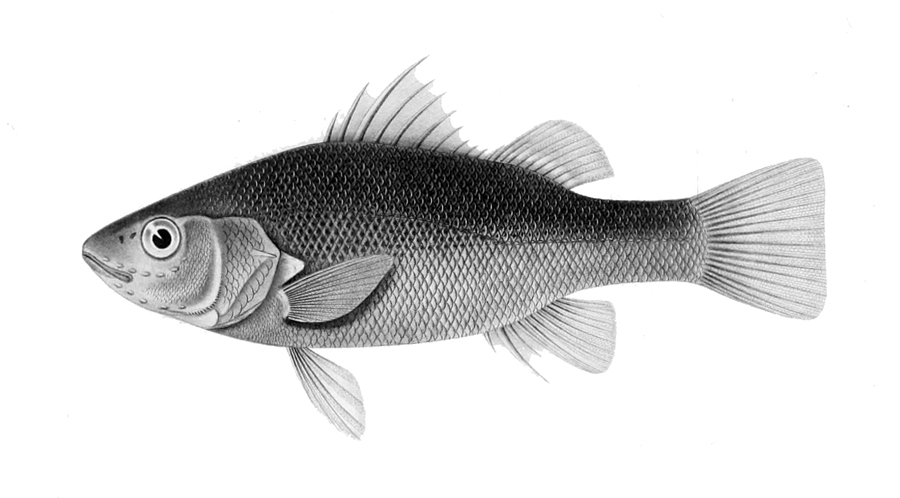
- P. melanops

Scientific classification
- Kingdom: Animalia
- Phylum: Chordata
- Class: Actinopterygii
- Division: Teleostei
- Order: Centrarchiformes
- Family: Percichthyidae
- Genus: Percichthys; Girard, 1855

Type species
- Percichthys chilensis Girard, 1855

Synonyms
- Percosoma T. N. Gill, 1861

= Percichthys =

Percichthys Temporal range: Eocene–present

Genus of ray-finned fishes

Percichthys is a genus of temperate perches native to freshwater habitats in Argentina and Chile.

The earliest fossil member of the genus is Percichthys hondoensis from the early Eocene of Argentina.

== Species ==
The currently recognized species in this genus are:

- Percichthys chilensis Girard, 1855
- Percichthys colhuapiensis MacDonagh, 1955 (largemouth perch)
- Percichthys laevis (Jenyns, 1840)
- Percichthys melanops Girard, 1855
- Percichthys trucha (Valenciennes, 1833) (creole perch)
