= Macquaria =

Macquaria Temporal range: Miocene–present
- Macquaria australasica

Scientific classification
- Kingdom: Animalia
- Phylum: Chordata
- Class: Actinopterygii
- Division: Teleostei
- Order: Centrarchiformes
- Family: Percichthyidae
- Genus: Macquaria; G. Cuvier, 1830

Type species
- Macquaria australasica G. Cuvier, 1830

Synonyms
- List: Paschalestes Gistel, 1848; Plectroplites T. N. Gill, 1862; Ctenolates Günther, 1871; Guyu Pusey & Kennard, 2001; Murrayia Castelnau, 1872; Riverina Castelnau, 1872

Genus of ray-finned fishes

Macquaria is a genus of medium-sized, predatory temperate perches endemic to the rivers of eastern Australia.

== Taxonomy ==
Previously, the two catadromous species Macquaria colonorum and M. novemaculeata were also placed in this genus. However, more recent phylogenetic studies have found they are not closely related to the two other species of the genus, and they are now placed in the genus Percalates in the monotypic family Percalatidae. These authors also found that the Percichthyidae and the Percalatidae were part of one of three cladesa within a new order, the Centrarchiformes in the Percomorpha.

== Species ==
The currently recognized species in this genus are:

Species	Common name	Image
Macquaria ambigua (J. Richardson, 1845)	golden perch	
Macquaria australasica (G. Cuvier, 1830)	Macquarie perch	
Macquaria wujalwujalensis (Pusey & Kennard, 2001)	Bloomfield River cod	

=== Fossil record ===
One fossil species is known in †Macquaria avus (Woodward, 1902) (=Ctenolates avus Woodward, 1902) from Miocene-aged freshwater deposits near Nimbin. Many fossil remains assigned to this genus are known from the Eocene to the Miocene of Australia. However, it is uncertain whether they belong to this genus or to Percalates (formerly subsumed within it).
