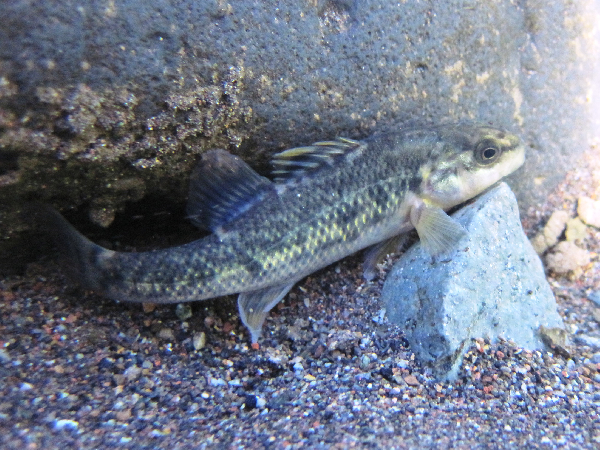

Conservation status
- Data Deficient (IUCN 2.3)

Scientific classification
- Kingdom: Animalia
- Phylum: Chordata
- Class: Actinopterygii
- Order: Centrarchiformes
- Family: Perciliidae
- Genus: Percilia
- Species: P. irwini

Binomial name
- Percilia irwini C. H. Eigenmann, 1928

= Percilia irwini =

Species of ray-finned fish

Percilia irwini is a species of perch-like ray-finned fish in the family Perciliidae found only in the Malleco and Bio-Bio River basins in Chile.
