= Percalates =

Percalates Temporal range: Early Eocene–recent
- Estuary perch (P. colonorum)
- Australian bass (P. novemaculeatus)

Scientific classification
- Kingdom: Animalia
- Phylum: Chordata
- Class: Actinopterygii
- Division: Teleostei
- Order: Centrarchiformes
- Suborder: Percalatoidei
- Genus: Percalates; Ramsay & Ogilby, 1887

Species
- P. colonorum; P. novemaculeatus; †P. antiquus (fossil)

Genus of fishes

Percalates (from Perca + Lates) is a genus of ray-finned fish native to both estuarine and freshwater habitats of southeastern Australia. They are the only members of the suborder Percalatoidei, and of their own undescribed family ('Percalatidae').

== Description ==
It contains two species, both of which were previously placed in the temperate perch genus Macquaria. However, more recent phylogenetic studies have found these two species to be the most basal members of the order Centrarchiformes, and thus more distantly related to the temperate perches than previously thought.

The following species are known:

- Percalates colonorum (Günther, 1863) - estuary perch
- Percalates novemaculeatus (Steindachner, 1866) - Australian bass

=== Fossil record ===
Well-preserved fossil specimens of the species †Percalates antiquus Hills, 1934 (=Macquaria antiquua) have been recovered from the Early Eocene-aged Redbank Plains Formation of Queensland, Australia. Partial fossil remains from the Lutetian-aged marine Kuldana Formation of Pakistan have also been assigned to this species, albeit based on an older taxonomic treatment of the Percichthyidae. Many other fossil remains assigned to this genus are also known the Oligocene and Miocene of Australia, though it is uncertain whether they belong to this genus or to Macquaria.
