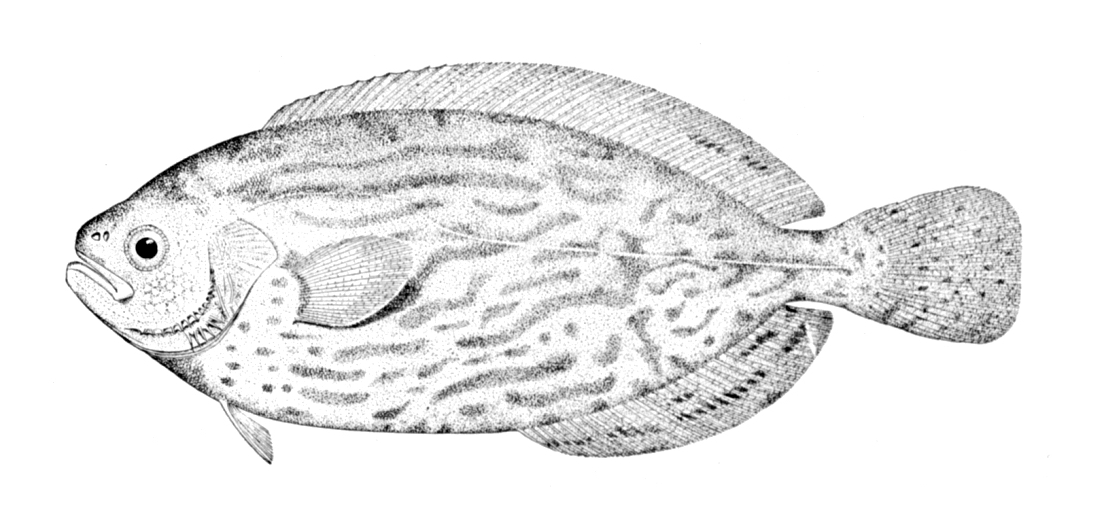

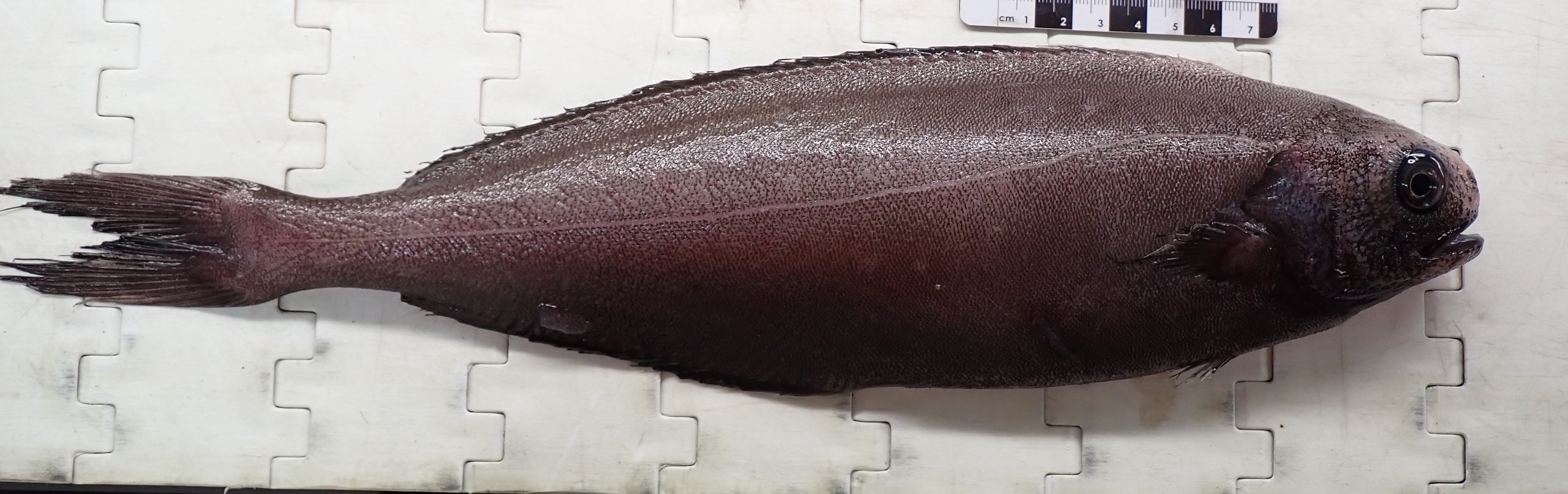

Conservation status
- Least Concern (IUCN 3.1)

Scientific classification
- Kingdom: Animalia
- Phylum: Chordata
- Class: Actinopterygii
- Order: Scombriformes
- Family: Centrolophidae
- Genus: Schedophilus
- Species: S. medusophagus

Binomial name
- Schedophilus medusophagus (Cocco, 1839)

= Schedophilus medusophagus =

Species of ray-finned fish

Schedophilus medusophagus is a species of ray-finned fish belonging to the family Centrolophidae.

Its native range is Europe, Atlantic Ocean, Africa.
