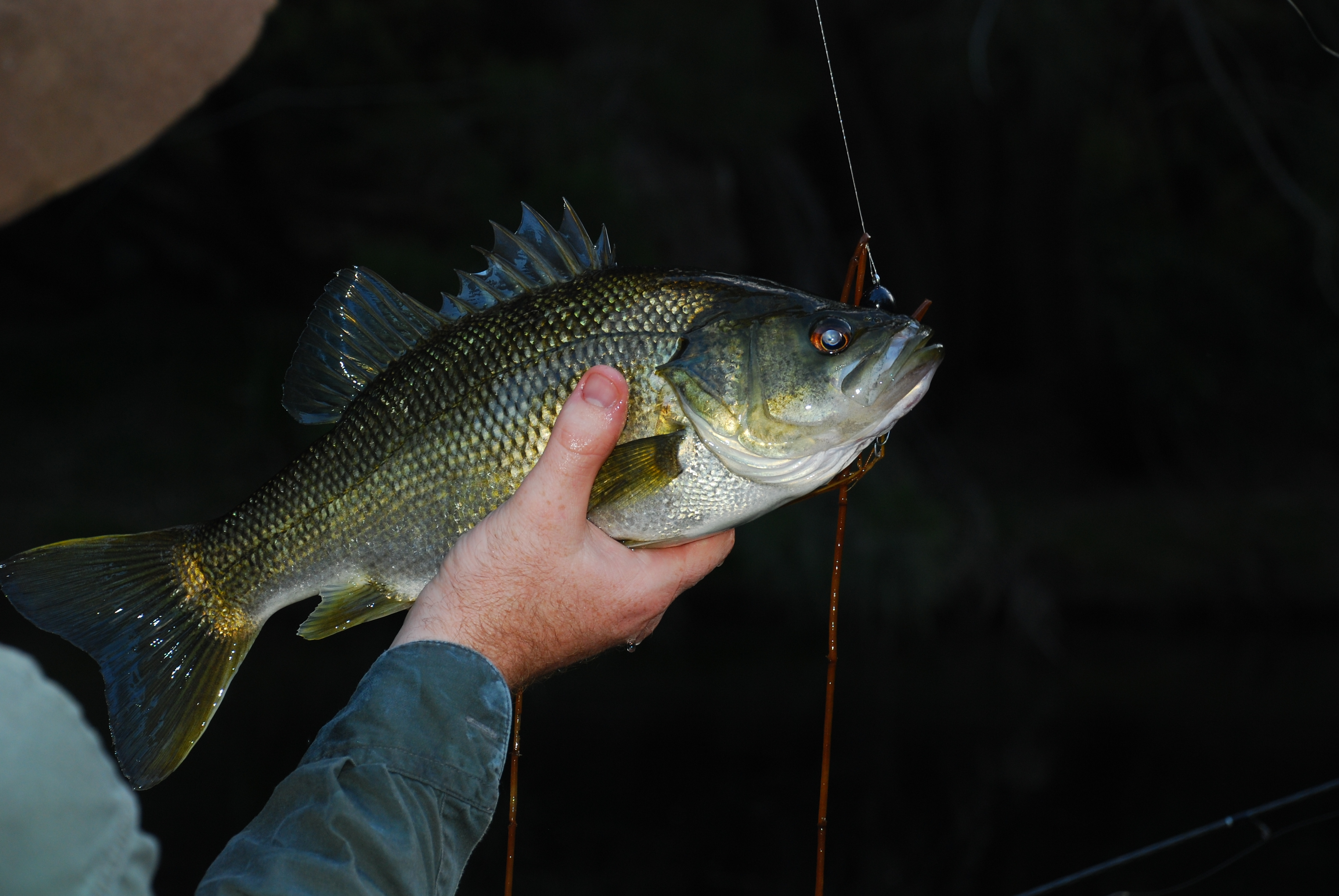

Conservation status
- Least Concern (IUCN 3.1)

Scientific classification
- Kingdom: Animalia
- Phylum: Chordata
- Class: Actinopterygii
- Division: Teleostei
- Order: Centrarchiformes
- Genus: Percalates
- Species: P. novemaculeatus

Binomial name
- Percalates novemaculeatus (Steindachner, 1866)

Synonyms
- List: Dules novemaculeatus Steindachner, 1866; Dules reinhardti Steindachner, 1867; Lates similis Castelnau, 1872; Macquaria novemaculeata (Steindachner, 1866)

= Australian bass =

Species of ray-finned fish

The Australian bass (Percalates novemaculeatus) is a small-to-medium-sized species of primarily freshwater (but estuarine spawning) ray-finned fish found in coastal rivers and streams along the east coast of Australia. A member of the order Centrarchiformes, the Australian bass is an important member of the native fish assemblages found in east coast river systems. It is a native predatory fish and an extremely popular game fish species among anglers.

== Etymology ==
The species was simply called perch in most coastal rivers where it was caught until the 1960s, when the name "Australian bass" started to gain popularity.

== Taxonomy ==
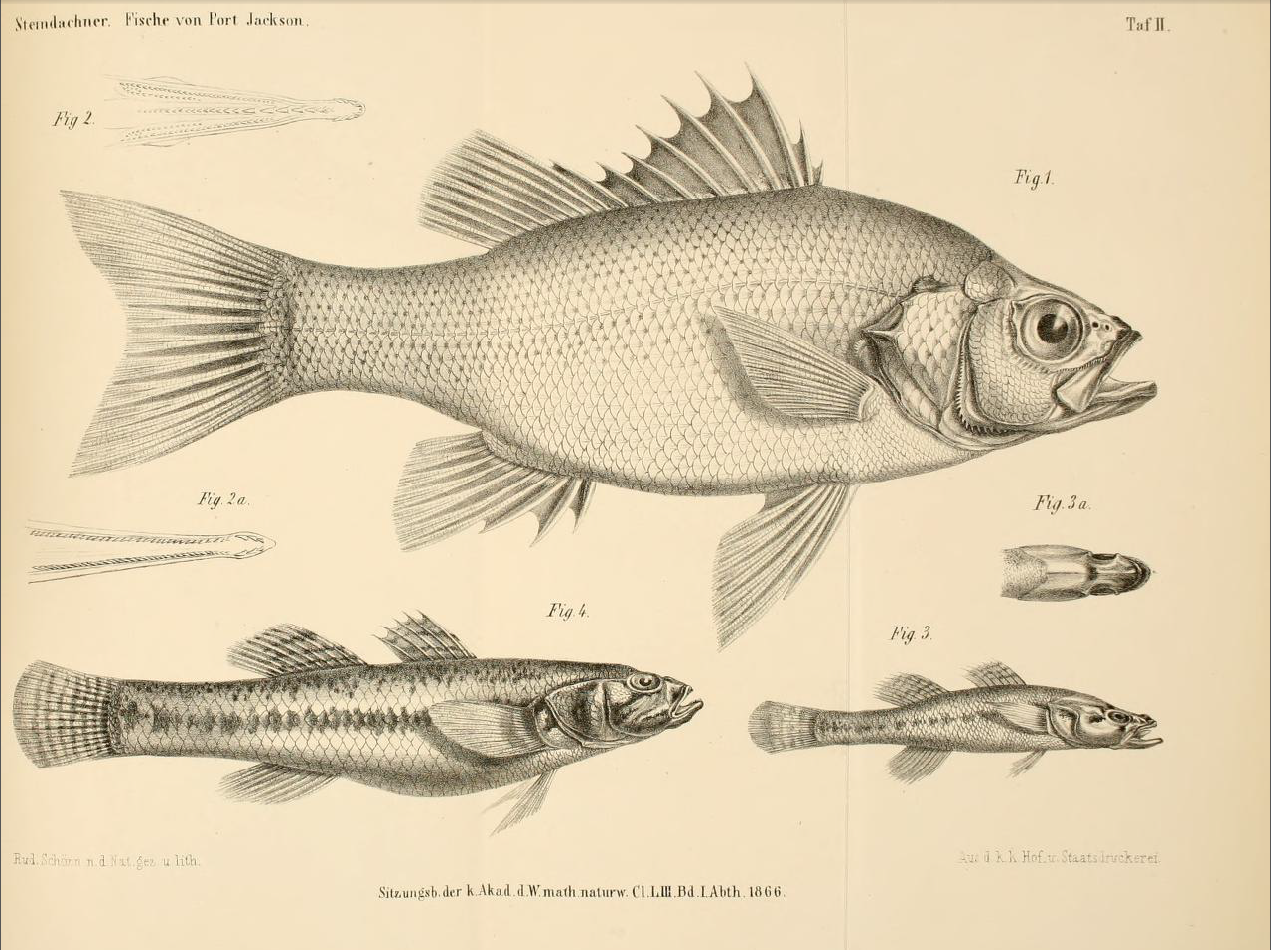
1866 illustration by Steindachner, accompanying his scientific description of the species

Australian bass (Percalates novemaculeatus) are closely related and very similar in appearance to estuary perch (Percalates colonorum). The estuarine perch, however, tends to stay in the estuarine reaches and (occasionally) in the extreme lower freshwater reaches. Although hybridization between the two species is rare overall, it is relatively common in the far southern extremities of the range of the Australian bass.

In the 1970s Australian bass and estuary perch were moved into the genus Macquaria – one of a number of Australian genera in the family Percichthyidae – along with two species of native perch from the Murray-Darling Basin, golden perch (Macquaria ambigua) and Macquarie perch (Macquaria australasica). Prior to that, Australian bass and estuary perch were in a separate genus, Percalates. (The generic name Percalates is a compound of the generic names Perca and Lates, and arose from an early, erroneous taxonomic belief that Australian bass were an old world perch related to barramundi (Lates calcarifer)).

Results from research using genetic MtDNA analysis revealed that Australian bass and estuary perch are not closely related to golden perch and Macquarie perch, which resulted in researchers resurrecting the genus Percalates and referring to Australian bass and estuary perch as Percalates novemaculeatus and Percalates colonorum respectively. Unexpectedly Percalates was found to be genetically closer to the genus Maccullochella (Murray cod and other cod species) than to the remnant genus Macquaria (golden perch and Macquarie perch). However, more recent studies have found Percalates to be the earliest-diverging genus within the order Centrarchiformes, being only distantly related to Macquaria and other percichthyids, and have been placed in their own putative family Percalatidae.

Steindachner does not explicitly state the reasons behind the surprisingly ambiguous specific name novemaculeata that he created for Australian bass. There are several possibilities. It may be a Latin rendering of "new" (novem) and "spotted" (maculeata) and refer to the distinct black blotches juvenile bass are temporarily marked with when very small (i.e. <6–7 cm (2.4–2.8 in)). It may be a Latin rendering of "in an unusual manner" (nove) and "spotted" (maculeata) and refer to the specimens he examined being "spotted":

"The upper half of the body is steel gray with a greenish shimmer, the lower half golden yellow. In the middle of each scale on the upper half of the body is a brownish spot. … some little brownish spots sometimes appear at the base of the first dorsal fin … The rather big dark spot on the gill cover is blurry …"

The most likely explanation however is a Latin rendering of "nine" (novem) and "spines/needles" (aculeata) and refer to the spiny dorsal fin, which is relatively high and sharp and which Steindachner indicates is usually (but not always) composed of nine dorsal spines:

"Dorsal with 9 spikes."

== Description and size ==
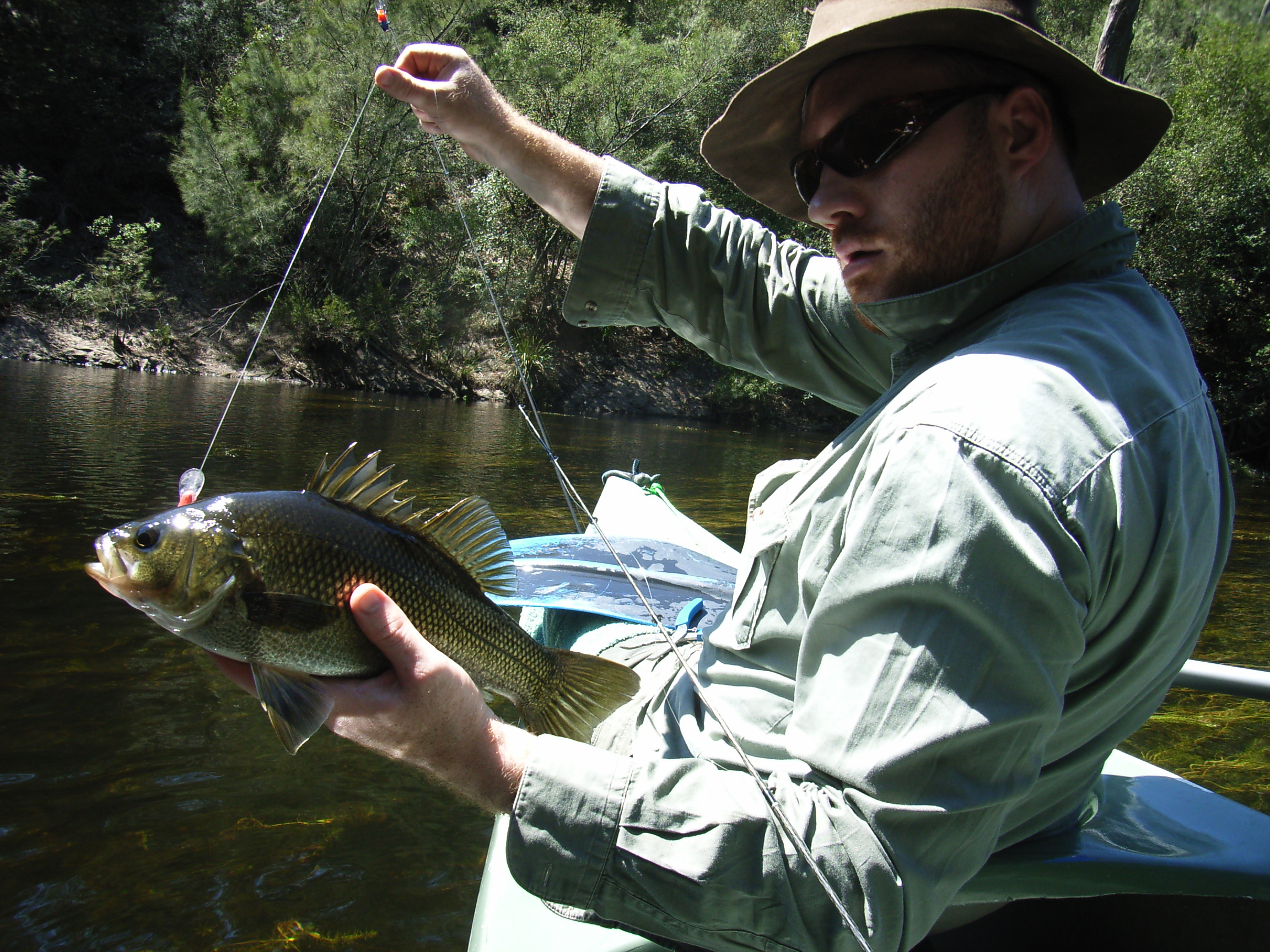
In New South Wales

Australian bass have a moderately deep, elongated body that is laterally compressed. They have a forked caudal ("tail") fin and angular anal and soft dorsal fins. Their spiny dorsal fin is relatively high, strong and sharp. They have a medium-sized mouth and relatively large eyes than can appear dark in low light or red in bright light. The opercula or gill covers on Australian bass carry extremely sharp flat spines that can cut fishermens' fingers deeply.

Australian bass vary in colour from metallic gold in clear sandy streams to the more usual bronze or bronze-green colouration in streams with darker substrates and/or some tannin staining to the water.

Australian bass are, overall, a smallish-sized species. Wild river fish average around 0.4–0.5 kg (0.88–1.10 lb) and 20–30 cm (7.9–11.8 in). A river fish of 1 kg (2.2 lb) or larger is a good specimen. Maximum size in rivers appears to be around 2.5 kg (5.5 lb) and 55 cm (22 in) in southern waters, and around 3 kg (6.6 lb) and 60–65 cm (24–26 in) in northern waters. Australian bass stocked in man-made impoundments (where they cannot breed) grow to greater average and maximum weights than this.

== Range ==
Australian bass are found in coastal rivers and streams from Wilsons Promontory in Victoria east and north along the eastern seaboard to the rivers and creeks of the Bundaberg region in central Queensland.

Australian bass are not found in the Murray-Darling system. Although the system is extensive, it terminates in a sequence of coastal lakes and lagoons and has only one shallow and changeable entrance to the Southern Ocean — features that appear to be incompatible with the estuarine breeding habits of Australian bass and other aspects of their life cycle.

=== Migratory patterns ===
Australian bass are primarily a freshwater riverine species, but must breed in estuarine waters. Consequently, Australian bass reside in the freshwater reaches of coastal rivers for the warmer half of the year or slightly more and in the estuarine reaches in winter, and are highly migratory in general.

A general description of the typical migratory pattern for adult Australian bass in the central (NSW) portion of their range would be:

- September: re-enter lower freshwater reaches after spawning
- October–November: movement through middle freshwater reaches
- December–February: maximum penetration into negotiable upper freshwater reaches
- March–April: slow movement back down through freshwater reaches in anticipation of spawning run
- May: strong spawning run to estuarine reaches
- June–July–August: aggregation and spawning in estuarine reaches

Obviously the timing of these migratory movements varies from the north to the south of their range, with bass in the far south of their range appearing to move and recruit in spring rather than winter, probably because of colder water temperatures. The timing of these migratory movements are also dependent on river flows, particularly freshes and floods that drown out and make larger rapids and cascades passable.

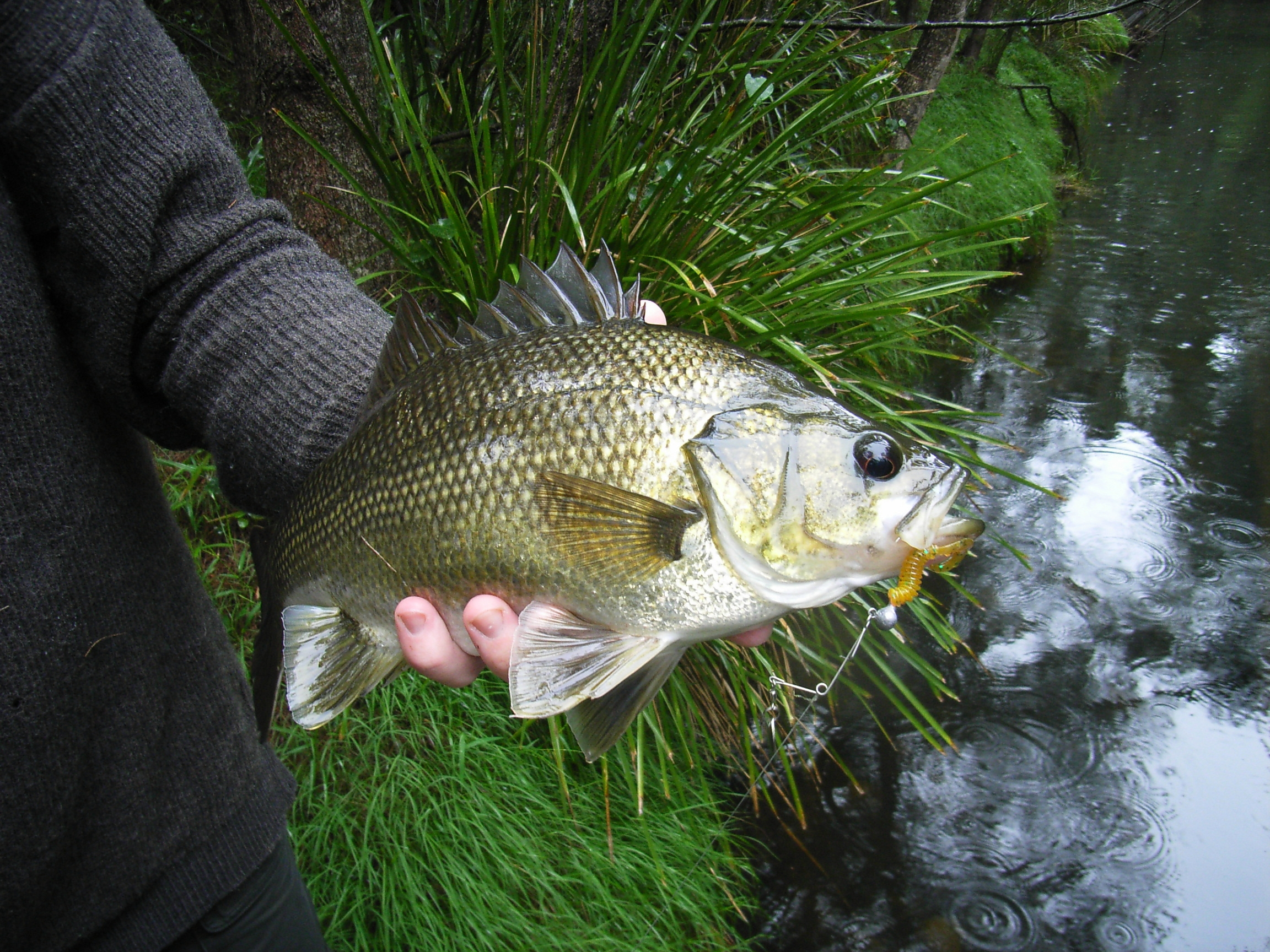
A large female (early autumn, freshwater reaches) before release. This specimen was making her way down to the estuary for winter spawning.

Australian bass are found at their highest altitude in the freshwater reaches of rivers during the months of December, January and February. Research indicates there is sexual segregation in this non-spawning season for resource partitioning purposes. Males inhabit the lower freshwater reaches of rivers while females travel far into the middle and even upper freshwater (upland) reaches. The distance Australia bass travel upstream appears to be limited only by flows and impassable barriers (historically, waterfalls; today, often, dams). Thus, historically, the effective altitudinal limit for Australian bass has been as high as 400–600 metres (1,310–1,970 ft) in some river systems. For instance, Australian bass originally migrated up to the Dalgety region in the Snowy River, well above Oallen Crossing on the Shoalhaven River (including the lower reaches of tributary Mongarlowe River) and far up the Warragamba River and Coxs River before these rivers were dammed:

"Messrs R. F. Seymour and L. Whitfeld were also out for perch, and the first-named did some exploring along the valley of the Cox River and the head of the Burragorang Valley. Mr Seymour found the perch plentiful in the Cox, but his travelling proved very rough."

— Angling. Sydney Morning Herald, 8 October 1910.

== Habitat ==
In the freshwater reaches of coastal rivers in the warmer months, Australian bass require reasonable quality, unsilted habitats with adequate native riparian vegetation and in-stream cover/habitat. Australian bass generally sit in cover during the day. However, they are fairly flexible about the type of cover used. Sunken timber ("snags"), undercut banks, boulders, shade under trees and bushes overhanging the water and thick weedbeds are all used as cover. Such cover does not need to be in deep water to be used; Australian bass are happy to use cover in water as shallow as 1 metre in depth.

Australian bass are strong swimmers at all sizes and can easily traverse rapids and fast-flowing water. However, they generally avoid sitting directly in currents to conserve energy.

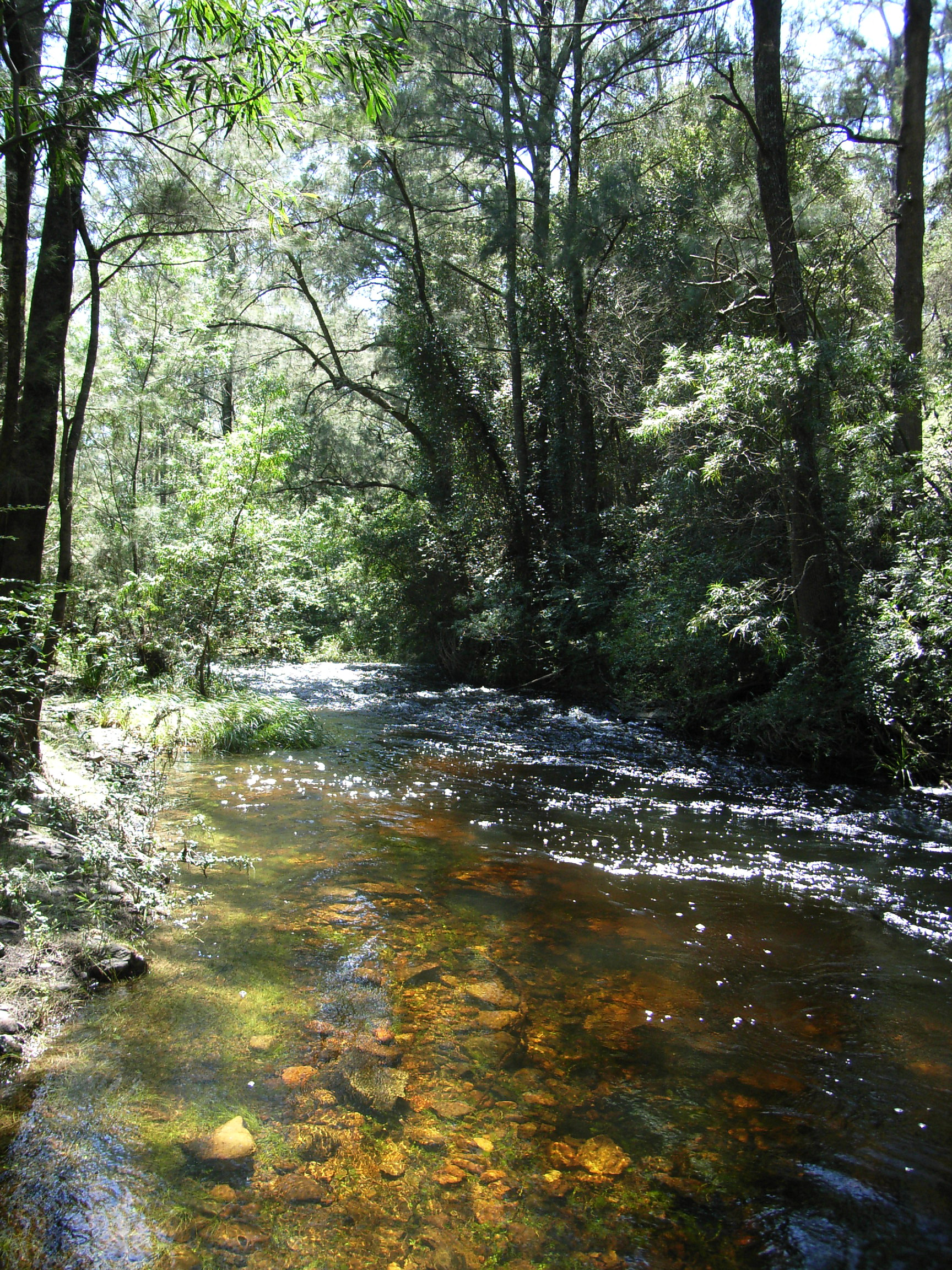
Australian bass easily traverse rapids like these in their coastal river habitats. However, they require floods or freshes to drown out more significant rapids and cascades and make them passable.

At night Australian bass display pelagic ("near-surface") behaviour and actively hunt prey in shallow water and at the water's surface.

When aggregated for spawning in the broad reaches of estuaries in winter, Australian bass are less cover oriented, and generally sit in deeper water.

== Diet ==
Common items in the diet of Australian bass are:

- terrestrial insects, particularly cicadas
- aquatic macroinvertebrates, particularly Trichoptera (caddisfly) larvae
- crustaceans in the forms of freshwater shrimps and estuarine prawns
- small fish, particularly flathead gudgeon (Philhypnodon grandiceps), which are common in their freshwater habitats.

However, Australian bass are fierce predatory fish and any small creature that swims across a bass pool such as (introduced) mice and native lizards or frogs are at risk of being attacked by a large Australian bass, and are regularly taken.

== Growth and age ==
For reasons that are not clear, Australian bass are extremely slow growing. Australian bass continue the trend present in the larger native fish species of SE Australia of being very long-lived. Longevity is a survival strategy to ensure that most adults participate in at least one exceptional spawning and recruitment event, which are often linked to unusually wet 'La Niña' years and may only occur every one or two decades. For many years, the maximum age recorded in wild Australian bass was 22 years. However, a wild bass from the Genoa River system has now been aged at 47 years of age. The same study recorded numerous wild bass aged 19 years of age and 29 years of age (corresponding to two separate years of strong recruitment).

== Reproduction ==
The Australian bass is sexually dimorphic. Males tend to have an absolute maximum size of 1 kg (2.2 lb) or less, while females regularly exceed 1 kg (2.2 lb) and sometimes reach the maximum size of 2.5–3 kg (5.5–6.6 lb). Males reach sexual maturity at 3+ years of age, females at 5–6 years of age.

Australian bass spawn in estuaries in winter, generally in the months of July or August. There is uncertainty about the salinity levels that Australian bass spawn in. Estuaries are dynamic habitats with daily fluxes in salinity due to tides, and are also affected by droughts, floods and freshes (minor, temporary rises in flow), making measurements of preferred spawning salinities for wild Australian bass difficult. However, based on capture of recently spawned larval and juvenile Australian bass in estuaries, the species appears to spawn in a salinity range of 8–12 parts per thousand (salt water is approximately 36 ppt). Australian bass sperm have no viability at or below 6 ppt, but are most viable at 12 ppt, the latter probably being the most relevant fact. However, it has been reported that Australian bass spawned in salinities of 12–18 ppt, with this statement based on fishermens' reports of observing wild Australian bass spawnings and some unpublished data gathered by the NSW Fisheries Department.

Artificial breeding of Australian bass is carried out at much higher salinities than natural.

Australian bass are highly fecund, with a reported mean fecundity ("fertility") of 440,000 eggs from the mature wild female specimens examined, and one very large specimen yielding 1,400,000 eggs. The eggs are reported as being demersal ("sinking") in natural spawning salinities, in which case estuarine vegetation such as sea grass almost certainly play an important role in "trapping" and protecting eggs. Larvae hatch in 2–3 days. Juvenile Australian bass migrate into the freshwater reaches after spending several months in estuarine waters.

Despite spawning in estuaries, Australian bass rely on floods coming down river systems into the estuaries throughout the winter period, both to stimulate migration and spawning in adult Australian bass and to create productivity increases that lead to strong survival and recruitment of Australian bass larvae.

Australian bass adults and larvae may also enter the sea (the latter perhaps involuntarily) during winter spawning in times of flood. It has been reported:

The presence of field-caught larvae of both species on incoming tides in Swansea Channel indicates that the larvae have spent some time in the ocean... Macquaria novemaculeata adults move downstream into estuaries to spawn in water of suitable salinity. In low rainfall years, the spawning location is further upstream than in wet years, when spawning can occur in shallow coastal waters adjacent to estuaries (Searle, pers. comm.). Mature M. novemaculeata adults can be found outside of estuaries in wet years (Williams, 1970). This is verified by the collection of mature adults by trawl in July 1995 in 11–17 m of water off Newcastle, NSW (AMS I.37358-001).

This kind of movement leads to some genetic interchange between river systems and is important in maintaining a high degree of genetic homogeneity ("sameness") in Australian bass stocks and preventing speciation. However, this movement has not prevented distinct genetic profiles and subtle morphological ("body shape") differences developing in different river systems. These findings, along with research showing significant differences in seasonal timing of spawning and migration in far south populations stress the importance of using appropriate regional Australian bass stocks for artificial breeding and stocking projects.

== Conservation ==
Wild Australian bass stocks have declined seriously since European settlement.

Dams and weirs blocking migration of Australian bass both to estuaries and to the upper freshwater reaches of coastal rivers is the most potent cause of decline. Most coastal rivers now have dams and weirs on them. If Australian bass are prevented from migrating to estuaries for breeding by an impassable dam or weir, then they will die out above that dam or weir. Some dams or weirs exclude Australian bass from the vast majority of their habitat. It is estimated for example that Tallowa Dam on the Shoalhaven River, once an Australian bass stronghold, currently excludes wild Australian bass from more than 80% of their former habitat (in early 2010 however a "fish lift" was fitted to the dam). Dams and weirs also diminish or completely remove flood events required for effective breeding of adult bass and effective recruitment of juvenile Australian bass. A related issue is the myriad of other structures on coastal rivers such as poorly designed road crossings that (often needlessly) block migration of Australian bass.

Another potent cause of decline is habitat degradation. Unfortunately poor land management practices have been the norm historically in Australia. Complete clearing of riparian (river bank) vegetation, stock trampling river banks, and massive siltation from these poor practices as well as poor practices in the catchment, can severely degrade and silt coastal rivers to the point of being uninhabitable for Australian bass. The Bega River in southern New South Wales is a particularly salutory example of a coastal river so stripped of riparian vegetation and so silted with coarse granitic sands from poor land management practices, that the majority of it is now completely uninhabitable by Australian bass and other native fish.

As a slow-growing fish, Australian bass are vulnerable to overfishing, and overfishing has been a driver of decline in Australian bass stocks in past decades. However, the situation has improved markedly now the majority of fishermen are practicing catch and release with Australian bass.

Hatchery breeding and stocking of Australian bass is used to create fisheries above dams and weirs but these are causing concern over genetic diversity issues, use of bass broodfish from different genetic strains, and introduction/translocation of unwanted pest fish species in stockings. Stockings can also mask and divert attention away from serious habitat degradation and decline of wild stocks in catchments.

== Fishing ==
Fishing for Australian bass is a summer pastime, undertaken in the freshwater reaches of the rivers they inhabit. Australian bass are highly regarded as a sport fish, fast and powerful for their size. Their strength is probably due to their strenuous annual migrations for spawning and migratory life-style. Australian bass may head for the nearest snags when hooked, and light but powerful tackles with stiff drag settings are needed to stop them.

As mentioned above, during the day Australian bass generally remain close to or in cover (e.g. snags, overhanging trees), and small plug lures and flies cast close to such cover are used. Australian bass will strike at a variety of lures from minnow-style hard-bodied diving lures to slowly jigged soft plastic baits, as well as various surface lures such as poppers and surface walkers. In recent years fly fishing for Australian bass using surface flies imitating cicadas has proven to be effective. At night Australian bass are a roaming pelagic feeder and surface lures (which waddle or fizz across the surface of the water) are used.

Some of the best Australian bass fishing is coastal rivers and tributaries where access is difficult. Fishing these more remote locations can be rewarding both for the fishing and the scenery. Fishing the more remote bass water is therefore usually the domain of the backpacking fisherman or the kayak fisherman willing to drag his kayak over logs and other obstacles.

It pays for fishermen to remember that wild Australian bass are still highly migratory when in the freshwater reaches of rivers, and can also be a wary fish in these habitats, much more so than exotic trout species.

Australian bass fishermen almost exclusively practice catch and release, which is necessary for the preservation of wild Australian bass stocks. The use of barbless hooks (which can be created by crushing the barbs flat with a pair of needle-nosed pliers) is essential as Australian bass hit lures with great ferocity and are consequently almost impossible to unhook on barbed hooks without serious injury to the fish. Conversely, Australian bass are swiftly and easily released if barbless hooks are used.

Responsible fishermen now avoid fishing for wild Australian bass in estuaries in winter, so that this increasingly pressured native fish can spawn in peace. In 2014 the NSW Fisheries Department announced an extended closed season for Australian bass and estuary perch, from 1 May to 31 August.

== Additional references ==
- Kaminskas S (2024). Migratory Flows and Stochastic Blows: A study of Australian grayling (Prototroctes maraena) and other native fish species of the Deua River, New South Wales, Australia. Published by the author, Canberra, Australia. http://dx.doi.org/10.13140/RG.2.2.24039.05283
- Mallen-Cooper M (1992). Swimming ability of juvenile Australian bass, Macquaria novemaculeata (Steindachner), and juvenile barramundi, Lates calcarifer (Bloch), in an experimental vertical-slot fishway. Australian Journal of Marine and Freshwater Research 43: 823–833.
- Schnierer SB (1982). The Biology of the Australian Bass (M. novemaculeata) (F. Steindachner) in the Richmond River, Northern New South Wales (Master's thesis). Brisbane, Queensland: University of Queensland.
- Steindachner F. (1866:50). Anzeiger der Kaiserlichen Akademie der Wissenschaften, Mathematisch-Naturwissenschaftlichen Classe v. 3 (no. 7); Steindachner Abstract Port Jackson, New South Wales, Australia. Syntypes: (4) NMW 38828 (2). Appeared first in the abstract as above, then in Steindachner (1866:428) [p. 5 of separate], Pl. 2 (fig. 1) Steindachner Full Description (In German).
