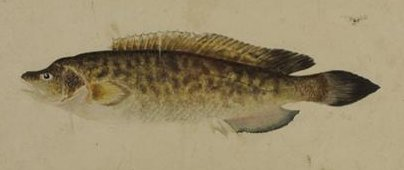

Conservation status
- Least Concern (IUCN 3.1)

Scientific classification
- Kingdom: Animalia
- Phylum: Chordata
- Class: Actinopterygii
- Order: Centrarchiformes
- Family: Percichthyidae
- Genus: Gadopsis
- Species: G. marmoratus

Binomial name
- Gadopsis marmoratus J. Richardson, 1848

= River blackfish =

Species of fish

The river blackfish (Gadopsis marmoratus) is a freshwater fish endemic to the temperate waters of south-eastern Australia. It is found from southern Queensland through to central Victoria, including in the Murray-Darling river system. It is also found in some eastern and southern flowing coastal rivers. Found primarily in upland and "midland" habitats, though early records of fish fauna suggest it was originally far more extensively distributed and was found in some lowland habitats as well. Originally, river blackfish co-inhabited many of its lowland and "midland" habitats with species such as Murray cod and golden perch, and its upland habitats with species such as trout cod and Macquarie perch. It is a popular angling fish in some parts of its range.

== Description ==
River blackfish are elongated with a rounded body, distinct snout and large mouth, and small to moderate sized eyes. The caudal fin, soft dorsal fin and anal fin are rounded. The spiny dorsal fin is low, weak and blends into the soft dorsal fin. Colour varies but is usually either yellow or green with dark green mottling, or a very dark purple/black colour.

It is an ambush predator that takes crayfish, shrimp, small fish and aquatic insects. It is strongly nocturnal.

Murray-Darling river blackfish show a maximum size of around 30 cm and < 0.8 kg, with larger specimens from coastal drainages reaching up to 60 cm (Gellibrand River).

It is a highly underrated sportsfish, particularly the Southern form (see below). It is fast and strong, and has been shown to take flies and lures, even surface lures, in addition to the more usual worm baits. There is an unofficial world record caught by Piotr Pomorski on a WildBait Lure, in Victoria Australia that measured 70 cm in length.

== Range and classification ==
Endemic to south-eastern Australia, river blackfish like many Murray-Darling native fishes have managed to cross the Great Dividing Range via natural river capture events and so are found in south-flowing coastal rivers and streams in the eastern half of Victoria. These fish are now often referred to as southern river blackfish. This population shows a far great maximum size of 60 cm or more and about 5.5 kg (12 lb). Specimens this large were likely to be very old — 30 years or more — and are rarely seen now. Southern river blackfish may be a separate species. The taxonomy does not yet reflect to this.

River blackfish continue the trend present in Murray-Darling native fish of speciating into primarily lowland species and upland species, with the upland species being in this case the two-spined blackfish, Gadopsis bispinosus. The two-spined blackfish is a more specialised upland inhabitant, and is found in the strongly flowing, cobble-bottomed sub-alpine rivers and streams of northeast Victoria, southeast New South Wales, and the Australian Capital Territory. While the split may be between lowland (or midland) and upland, there are overlaps in their range, and river blackfish are found in many upland habitats. There are also indications river blackfish populations in the southern and northern halves of the Murray-Darling river system may represent two distinct species or sub-species, with genetic and other differences.

== Conservation ==
Blackfish have declined very seriously due to overfishing, stream siltation and snag removal, and predation and competition by introduced species, particularly introduced trout species. Recent bushfires in south-eastern Australia (2003–2006) have filled many blackfish rivers with large quantities of silt, and infilled the interstices ("gaps") between larger rocks that blackfish normally use as a refuge from predatory alien trout species. The presumed result will be increased levels of alien trout predation on blackfish, and the long-term future of blackfish species is now of some concern. The blackfish species are very low in fecundity, slow-growing and long-lived, and have low migratory tendencies, so are extremely vulnerable to overfishing and localised extinctions.

River Blackfish are a protected species in South Australia.
