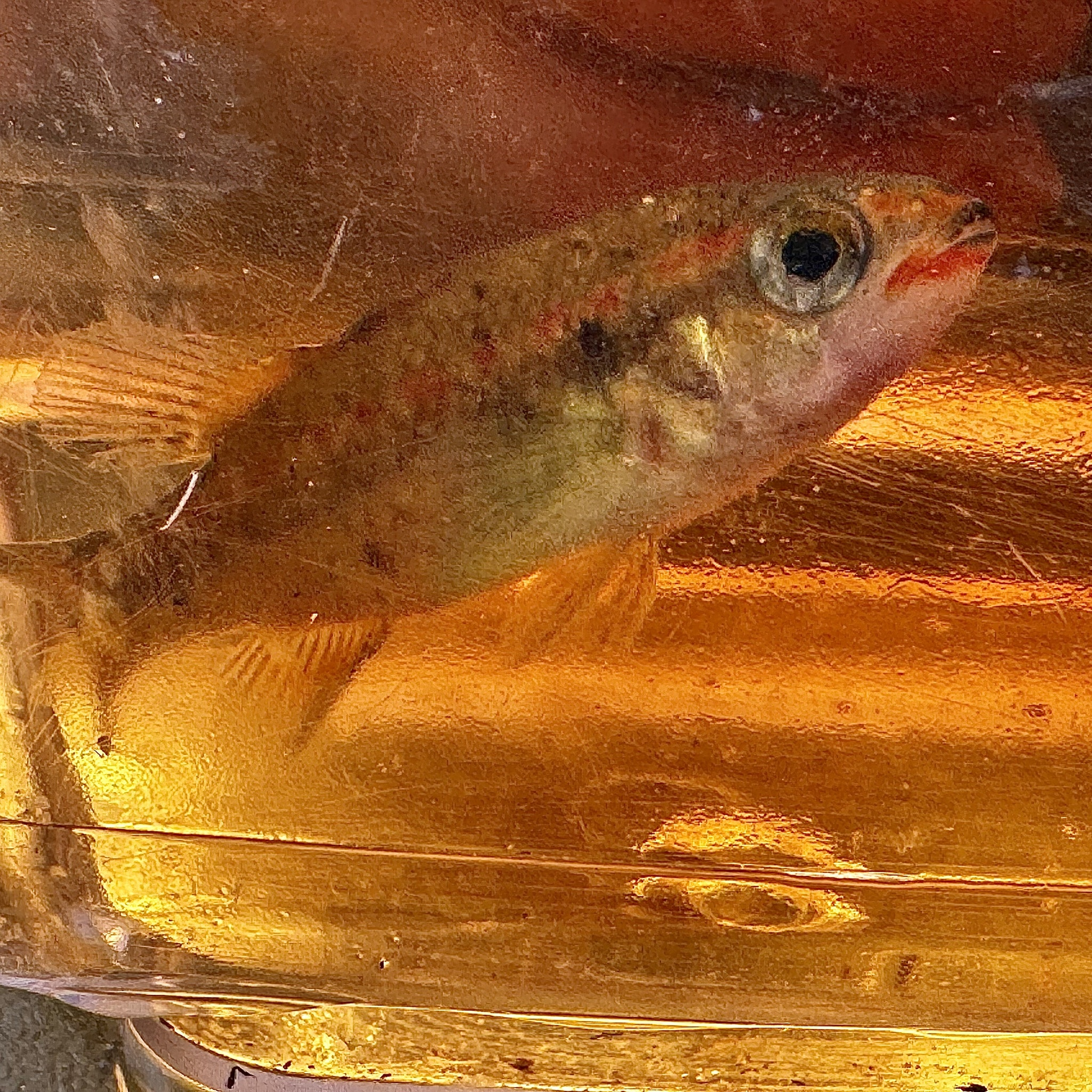

Conservation status
- Endangered (IUCN 3.1)

Scientific classification
- Kingdom: Animalia
- Phylum: Chordata
- Class: Actinopterygii
- Order: Centrarchiformes
- Family: Percichthyidae
- Genus: Nannatherina; Regan, 1906
- Species: N. balstoni

Binomial name
- Nannatherina balstoni Regan, 1906

= Balston's pygmy perch =

Species of ray-finned fish

Balston's pygmy perch (Nannatherina balstoni), also known as Balston's perchlet, or king river perchlet, is a species of temperate perch endemic to Southwest Australia, where it occurs in coastal streams, ponds, lakes, and swamps. It prefers shallow, acidic waters with patches of sedge growth. This species can reach 9 cm (3.5 in) SL, though most do not exceed 6 cm (2.4 in). It can also be found in the aquarium trade.
