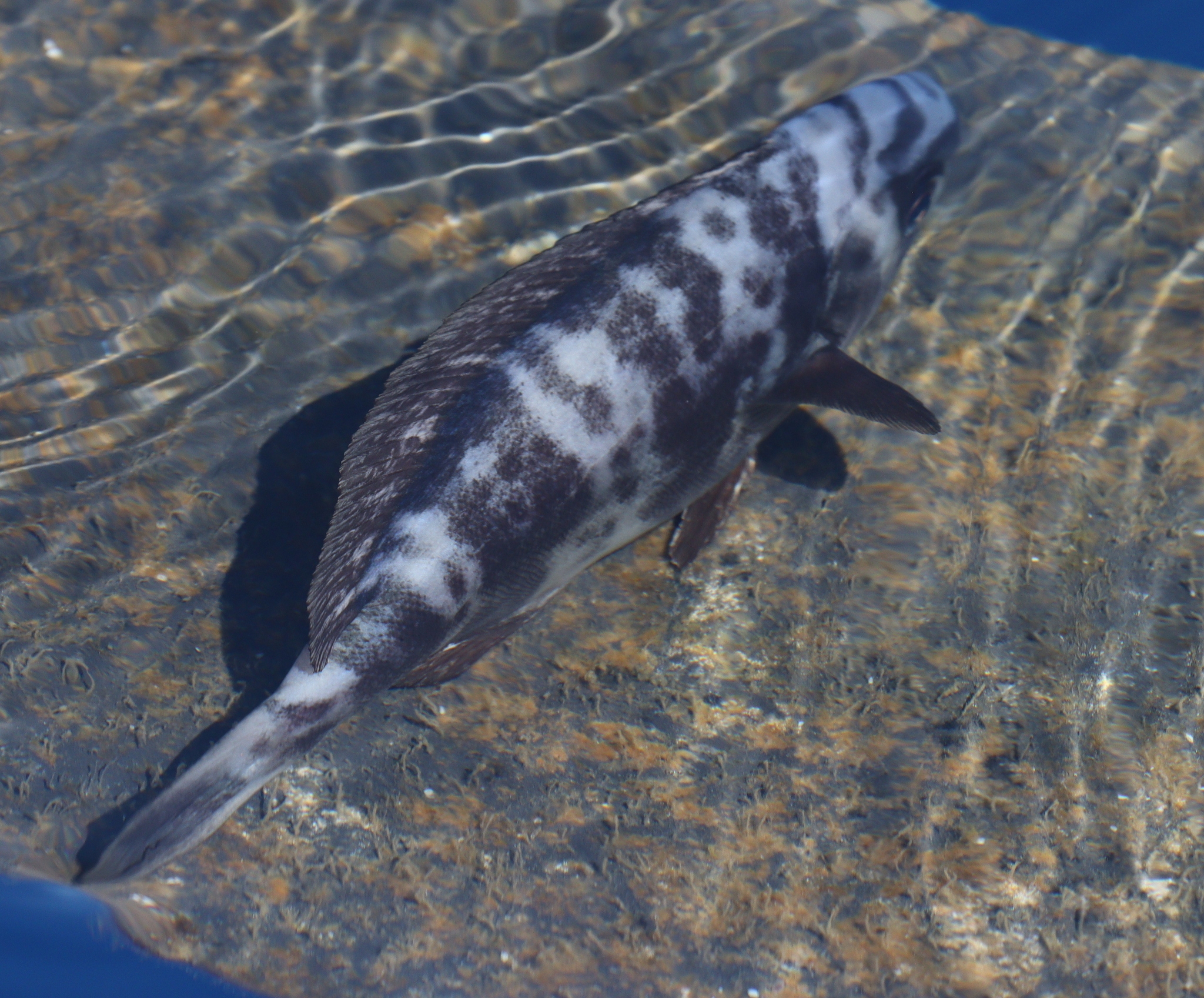

Scientific classification
- Kingdom: Animalia
- Phylum: Chordata
- Class: Actinopterygii
- Order: Scombriformes
- Family: Centrolophidae
- Genus: Schedophilus
- Species: S. ovalis

Binomial name
- Schedophilus ovalis (G. Cuvier, 1833)

Synonyms
- Centrolophus ovalis Cuvier, 1833; Mupus ovalis (Cuvier, 1833); Centrolophus crassus Cuvier, 1833; Leirus bennettii Lowe, 1834; Crius berthelotii Valenciennes, 1839; Mupus imperialis Cocco, 1840; Centrolophus porosissimus Canestrini, 1864; Centrolophus rotundicauda Costa, 1866; Schedophilus botteri Steindachner, 1868; Centrolophus corcyrensis Kolombatović, 1902; Eucrotus ventralis Bean, 1912

= Imperial blackfish =

Species of ray-finned fish

The imperial blackfish, Schedophilus ovalis, is a medusafish of the family Centrolophidae found in the eastern Atlantic and the Mediterranean Sea, and occasionally in the western Atlantic (Bermuda). It occurs at depths of between 70 and 700 m. In its juvenile stage, it is often found finding shelter amongst the tentacles of floating jellyfish, including the Portuguese man o' war. It grows to 100 cm (39 in) total length.

== Distribution ==
The Imperial Blackfish was first discovered in the Aegean Sea in 2009. It had previously been discovered in the waters around northern Spain, the Bay of Biscay, Portugal, the waters near northwestern France, and the North Sea. In December 2001, it was first discovered in Irish waters near the Blasket Islands off the coast of County Kerry.
