= Percilia =

- Percilia gillissi

Scientific classification
- Kingdom: Animalia
- Phylum: Chordata
- Class: Actinopterygii
- Division: Teleostei
- Order: Centrarchiformes
- Suborder: Centrarchoidei
- Family: Perciliidae; Jordan, 1923
- Genus: Percilia; Girard, 1855

Type species
- Percilia gillissi Girard, 1855

Genus of ray-finned fishes

Percilia is a genus of perch-like ray-finned fish in the monogeneric family Perciliidae.

== Species ==
The genus Percilia currently contains these two species which are endemic to Chile:

- Percilia gillissi Girard, 1855
- Percilia irwini C. H. Eigenmann, 1928
