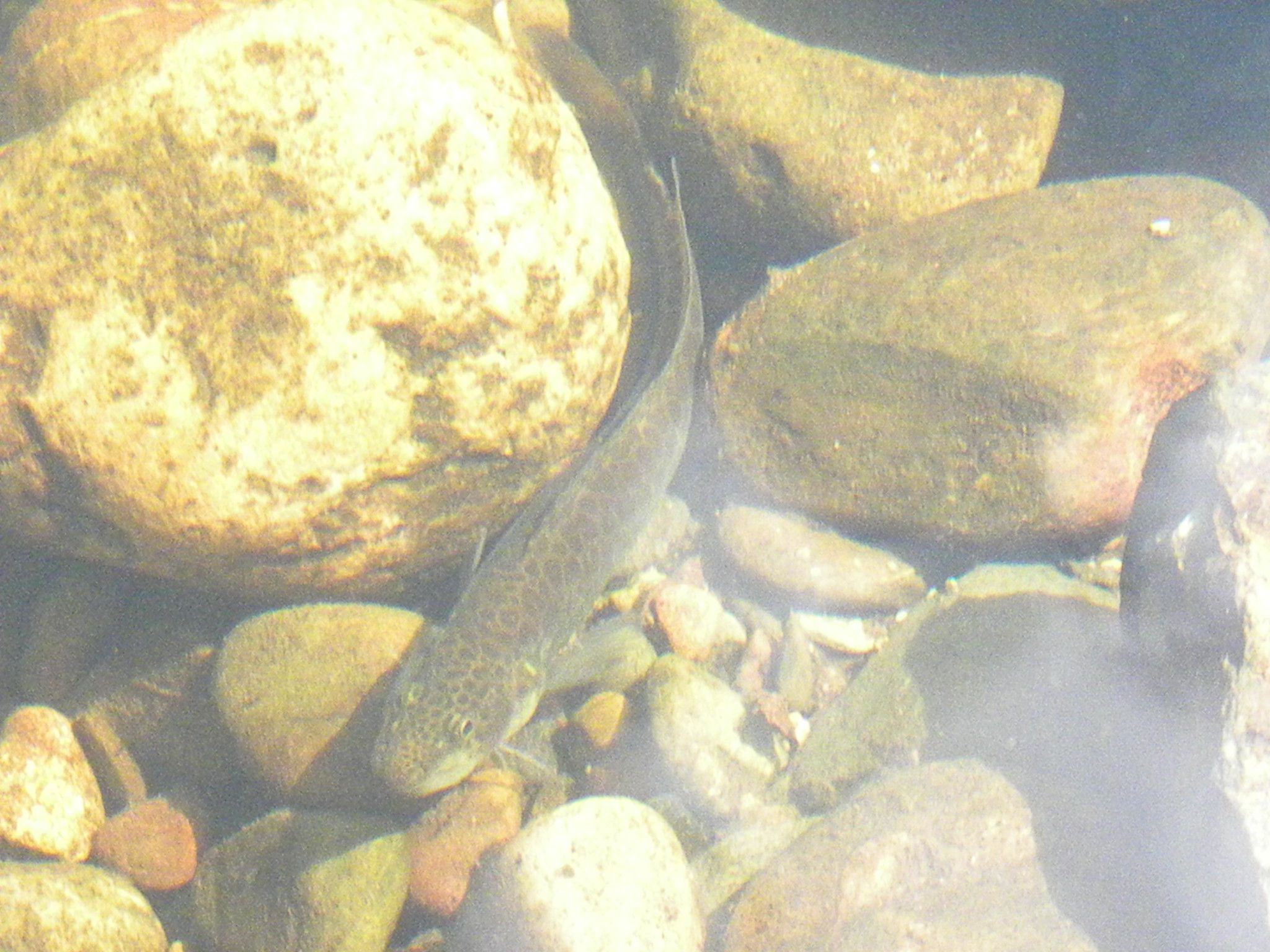

Conservation status
- Near Threatened (IUCN 3.1)

Scientific classification
- Kingdom: Animalia
- Phylum: Chordata
- Class: Actinopterygii
- Order: Centrarchiformes
- Family: Percichthyidae
- Genus: Gadopsis
- Species: G. bispinosus

Binomial name
- Gadopsis bispinosus Sanger, 1984

= Two-spined blackfish =

Species of fish

The two-spined blackfish (Gadopsis bispinosus) is a species of temperate perch endemic to Australia.

It is found in the cool, clear, strong-flowing, cobble bottomed, sub-alpine rivers and streams (ranging from small to large) in the southeast corner of the Murray-Darling river system. Their range encompasses northeast Victoria, southeast New South Wales and the Australian Capital Territory. Originally two-spined blackfish co-inhabited many of these waters with Macquarie perch and trout cod.

Two-spined blackfish are similar in shape and appearance to river blackfish, though their spiny dorsal fin usually contain only two spines (hence their scientific name) in comparison to river blackfish which have 7 to 13 distinguishable spines in their spiny dorsal fin. (In reality, this is a rather academic point as two-spined blackfish have blurred the difference between the dorsal spines and the dorsal rays that make up their soft dorsal fin, and any distinctions between the two weakly calcified dorsal spines and the dorsal rays that follow it are hard to pick in a living specimen.)

The two-spined blackfish is similar to the river blackfish in spawning and diet; however, they prefer rocks and the interstices ("gaps") between to timber as the main spawning and habitat sites. Two-spined blackfish are also much smaller, commonly 15 to 17 cm and a maximum size of 30 cm.

The species feeds mostly on aquatic insect larvae and terrestrial invertebrates, and occasionally other fishes and crayfish. Two-spined blackfish breed between October and December. Larvae hatch after around 16 days and remain at the spawning site with the male parent for another 3 weeks.

Two-spined blackfish have declined seriously due to stream siltation and competition by introduced species, particularly introduced trout species. The species suffers serious predation and competition from introduced species of trout but due its nocturnal habits and cryptic, cover-oriented behaviour it appears to survive in sufficient numbers to maintain populations in high quality habitats. Recent severe bushfires in south-eastern Australia (2003–2006), however, have filled many upland rivers with large quantities of silt, and infilled the interstices ("gaps") between larger rocks that two-spined blackfish normally use as a refuge from predatory trout species. The presumed result will be increased levels of trout predation on two-spined blackfish and the long-term future of two-spined blackfish is now of some concern. The blackfish species are very low in fecundity, slow-growing and long lived, and have low migratory tendencies, so are extremely vulnerable to overfishing and localised extinctions.
