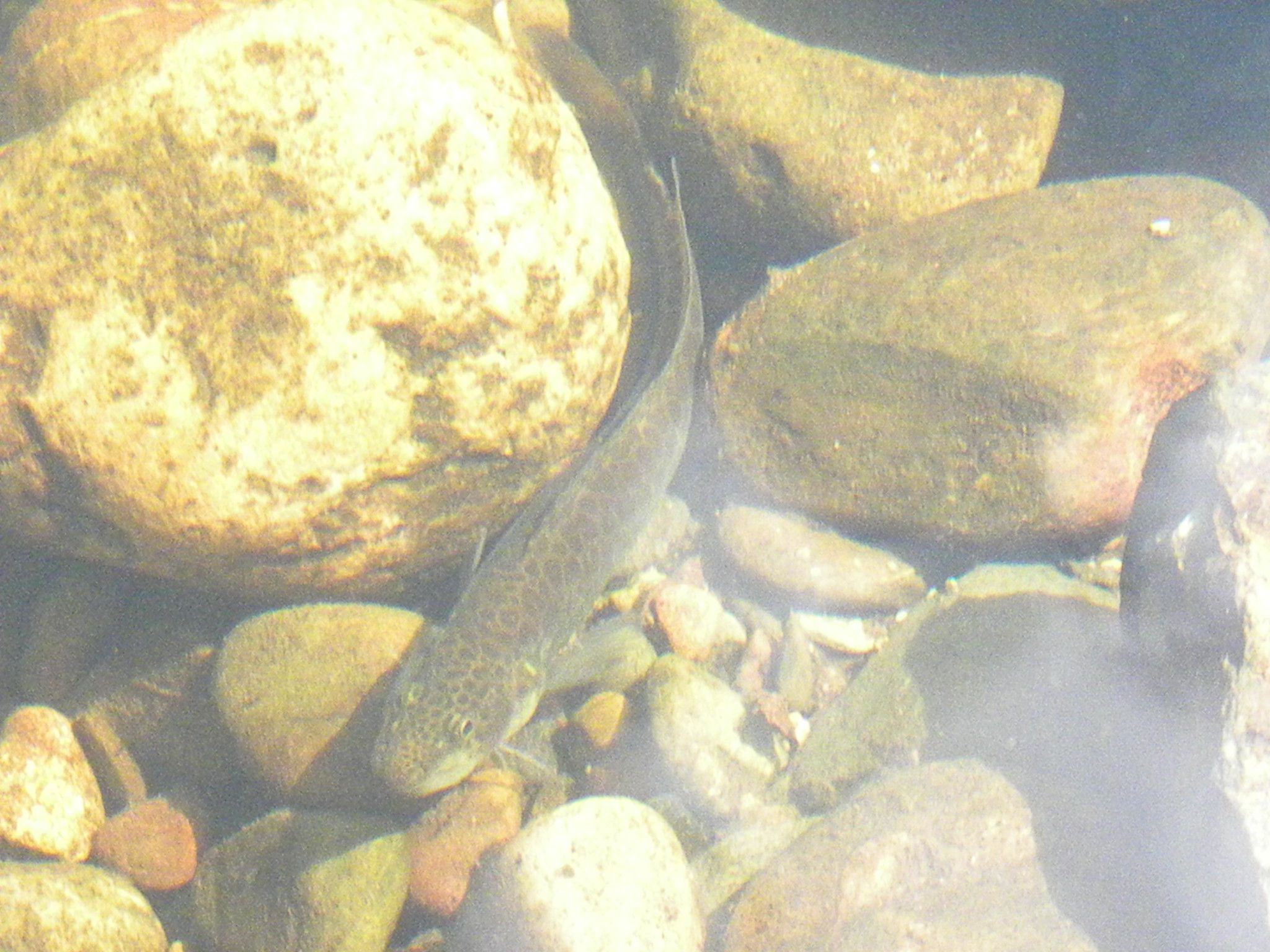
- Gadopsis bispinosus

Scientific classification
- Kingdom: Animalia
- Phylum: Chordata
- Class: Actinopterygii
- Order: Centrarchiformes
- Family: Percichthyidae
- Genus: Gadopsis; J. Richardson, 1848

Type species
- Gadopsis marmoratus J. Richardson, 1848

= Gadopsis =

Genus of fishes

Gadopsis is a genus of temperate perches endemic to freshwater habitats in southeastern Australia. The genus was formerly considered to be in a family of its own, Gadopsidae.

This genus and the Maccullochella cods (such as the Murray cod, Maccullochella peelii) are strongly similar. There are some grounds for believing blackfish may be a smaller version of Murray cod, inhabiting similar niches but in habitats are too small for Murray cod (having said this, their distributions originally overlapped substantially), and there are grounds for believing that blackfish and Murray cod have drawn heavily on common genes at the family level. FishBase, for instance, has scrapped the family Gadopsidae and listed the blackfishes as members of the temperate perch family, Percichthyidae. A mitochondrial DNA study has confirmed a relationship between the Blackfish and the Percichthyidae but the exact relationship was not resolved in that study. Further study is needed to resolve the relationship between the blackfish and the Percichthyidae. In addition, molecular studies have supported the view that G. marmoratus is a species complex of five different species, these include a species in the Murray-Darling Basin and four species in coastal freshwaters. One of these forms from Victoria has been named as Gadopsis gracilis.

Blackfish have a recruitment method similar to Murray cod, but with more specialisation to upland habitats. Blackfish spawn in spring and lay a very limited number of large, adhesive eggs (<1000) on sunken timber (snags), or in the case of two-spined blackfish on submerged rocks. Similar to Murray cod, the male guards the eggs until they hatch. Upon hatching the larval blackfish are, uniquely, attached to their ruptured egg case by a tether until the yolk sac is largely used and the larvae are ready to commence exogenous feeding. (This unique structure is presumably an adaptation to upland river/stream habitats, to prevent larvae being swept away in currents.)

== Species ==
There are two species in this genus:

- Gadopsis bispinosus Sanger, 1984 (Two-spined blackfish)
- Gadopsis marmoratus J. Richardson, 1848 (River blackfish)
