= Macquarie perch =

- At the Melbourne Aquarium

Conservation status
- Endangered (IUCN 3.1)

Scientific classification
- Kingdom: Animalia
- Phylum: Chordata
- Class: Actinopterygii
- Division: Teleostei
- Order: Centrarchiformes
- Family: Percichthyidae
- Genus: Macquaria
- Species: M. australasica

Binomial name
- Macquaria australasica G. Cuvier, 1830

Synonyms
- List: Dules viverrinus Krefft, 1868; Murrayia guntheri Castelnau, 1872; Riverina fluviatilis Castelnau, 1872; Murrayia cyprinoides Castelnau, 1872; Murrayia bramoides Castelnau, 1872; Dules christyi Castelnau, 1872; Murrayia riverina W. J. Macleay, 1881; Murrayia jenkinsi W. J. Macleay, 1885

Species of fish

The Macquarie perch (Macquaria australasica) is an Australian freshwater fish of the Murray-Darling river system. It is a member of the family Percichthyidae.

The Macquarie perch derives its scientific name from the Macquarie River where the first scientifically described specimen was collected (Macquaria) and a derivation of the Latin word for "southern" (australasica).

== Description and diet ==
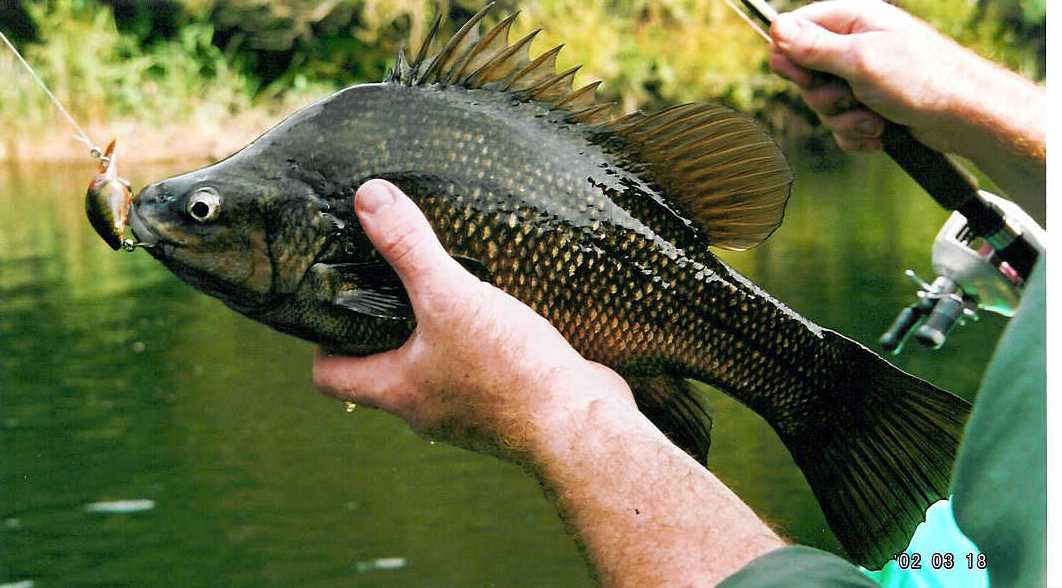
Large specimen caught on a barbless hook

Macquarie perch are medium-sized fish, commonly 30–40 cm and 1.0–1.5 kg. Maximum size is about 2.5 kg and 50 cm. The body is elongated, deep, and laterally compressed. The caudal fin, anal fin and soft dorsal fin are rounded. Spiny dorsal fin medium height and strong. Mouth and eyes are relatively small. Colouration can vary from tan to (more commonly) dark purplish-grey to black. The irises of the eyes are distinctly silver.

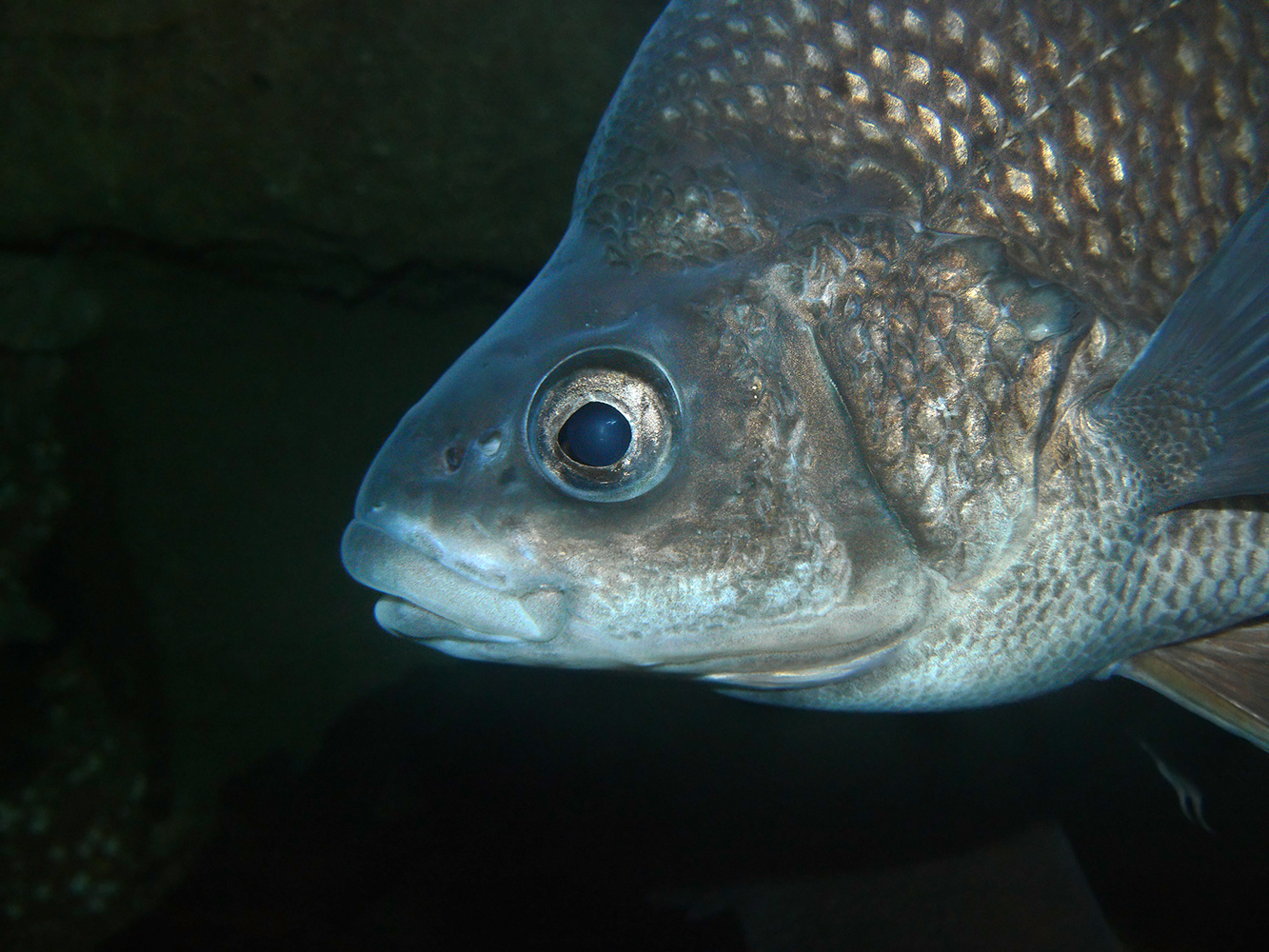
Closeup of Macquarie perch head

Macquarie perch are a relatively placid native fish species with the bulk of their diet consisting of aquatic invertebrates such as caddisfly, stonefly and mayfly species, with a small quantity of terrestrial insects taken as well.

== Breeding and biology ==
The Macquarie perch is primarily an upland native fish and has a breeding biology clearly adapted to flowing upland rivers and streams. (For this reason, the species has proven difficult to breed artificially, as captive females do not produce ripe eggs when kept in still broodponds or tanks). Macquarie perch breed in late spring at temperatures of 15 to 16 °C, in flowing water over unsilted cobble and gravel substrate. The demersal (sinking) eggs fall into the interstices (spaces) between the gravel and cobble, where they lodge and are then protected and incubated until hatching. This is a breeding strategy similar to that used by introduced species of trout.

Macquarie perch appear to have inherited the sexual dimorphism of other Macquaria species where females reach a larger maximum size than males. Females also reach sexual maturity at older, larger sizes than males.

Limited ageing work on Macquarie perch has recorded fish to 20 years of age. Maximum age for Macquarie perch is probably similar to the maximum age recorded for the closely related golden perch (26 years).

== Range ==
Macquarie perch were originally found in the larger upland rivers and streams in the south-eastern corner of the Murray-Darling system, which they usually co-inhabited with trout cod and one or both of the blackfish species.

Macquarie perch continue a pattern found in native freshwater fish of the Murray-Darling system of specialisation into lowland and upland stream inhabitants. Macquarie perch are a speciated, more specialised upland version of the golden perch, which is primarily a lowland fish. (Having said this, the primarily lowland golden perch, being highly adaptable species, did extend into upland habitats) in some situations.

Macquarie perch are found in the eastern coastal Shoalhaven and Hawkesbury-Nepean river systems as well as the Murray-Darling Basin, indicating that, as with some other native fish genera in south-eastern Australia, Macquarie perch have managed to cross the Great Dividing Range through natural river capture/connection events. Genetic research now indicates the Shoalhaven River population was the ancestral Macquarie perch population and colonised the Hawkesbury-Nepean system ~2 million years ago, and the Hawkesbury-Nepean population then colonised the Murray-Darling Basin – possibly through a "wet divide" in the Breadalbane Plains region, ~657,000 years ago (Faulks et al., 2008).

Major differences between the eastern coastal populations and the Murray-Darling population are that the eastern coastal populations display a far smaller average and maximum size (15 and 20 cm respectively) and are reported to have one less vertebra than the Murray-Darling species. Recent evidence suggest the Shoalhaven population is now extinct after a rapid decline due to damming of their habitat and subsequent encroachment of legally and illegally stocked fish species. The Hawkesbury-Nepean population appears to be threatened by introduced trout and other exotic fish, river damming and regulation, siltation, and urban encroachment, but does not appear to be as threatened as the Murray-Darling species. Information on this page relates primarily to the Murray-Darling population.

There is a translocated population in the Mongarlowe River, a tributary of the Shoalhaven. It is thought that this population descends from fish from the Murray-Darling Basin and not the eastern sub-species native to other parts of the Shoalhaven catchment. In recent years, this population seems to be in decline and may be doomed to local extinction.

There is also a translocated self-sustaining breeding population of Macquarie Perch located in the middle and upper reaches of the Yarra River on the outskirts of Melbourne. Their highest numbers are found lowest reaches, which also support a mix of translocated native and introduced fish including trout. In this stretch however no fish species is particularly dominant, and introduced trout are not numerous.

== Conservation ==
Murray-Darling Macquarie perch are now listed as endangered on state and Commonwealth listings. Gross overfishing by anglers, habitat degradation through siltation, and regulation of flow and "thermal pollution" by dams have all been major causes of decline. A mysterious but endemic disease called Epizootic Haemotopoeitic Necrosis virus (EHN virus), now vectored by introduced redfin perch, has been proven to be fatal to Macquarie perch, and may have contributed to the decline of some populations of Macquarie perch in upland impoundments. What has become clear however is that total domination of the Macquarie perch's upland habitats by introduced brown trout (Salmo trutta) and rainbow trout (Oncorhynchus mykiss) have also been a major cause of decline. Indeed, Macquarie perch populations have failed in significant stretches of relatively pristine upland river that offer excellent habitat, are not silted, dammed or overfished, and where there are no possible explanations for their demise except introduced trout species. Dietary studies have documented significant overlap between the diet of Macquarie perch and introduced trout species, and anglers have observed predation of Macquarie perch juveniles by introduced trout species. Several publications in the 1940s through to the 1960s by the director of the Victorian Fisheries and Game Department (A. D. Butcher) documents predation on juvenile trout cod, Macquarie perch and other upland native fish species by introduced trout species, and major dietary overlaps. Recent research (Lintermans, 2006) records dietary overlaps that are significant by scientific criteria between Macquarie perch and introduced trout species.

Over the last 20 or 30 years, the last few remaining Macquarie perch populations in upland habitats have faltered. All of these populations appear to be in extinction vortices and may disappear completely over the next several decades.

Macquarie perch have proved difficult but not impossible to breed. However, no Australian government agency is breeding Macquarie perch in significant numbers, and some government agencies are stocking upland habitats containing remnant Macquarie perch populations with introduced trout species. Not only do these stockings threaten Macquarie perch by competition and predation, but rainbow trout fingerlings have been shown to carry significant levels of EHN virus.
