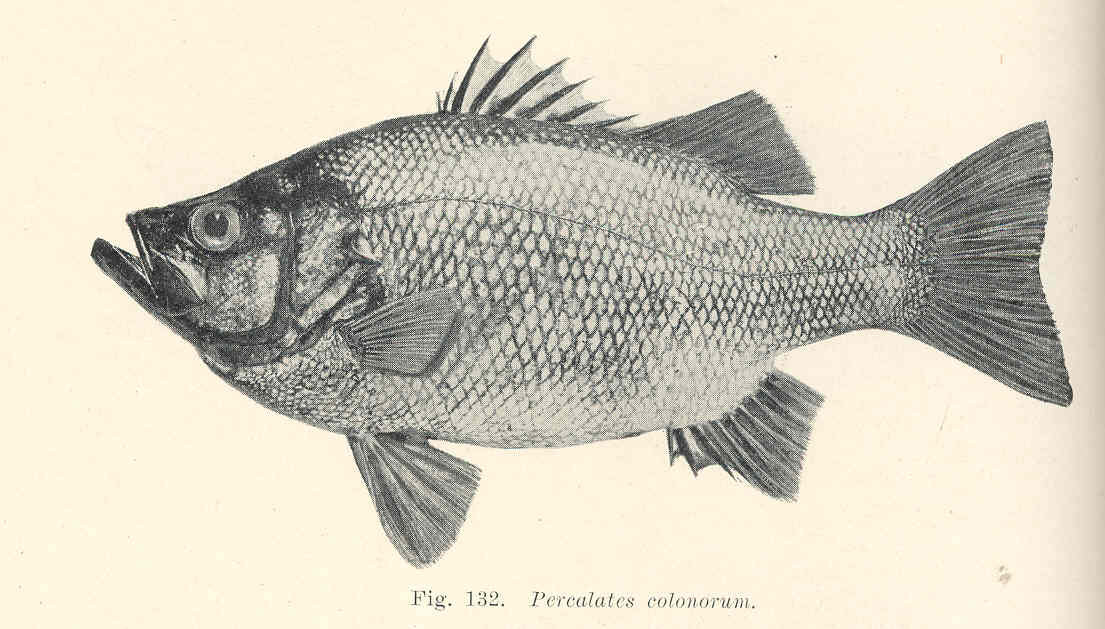

Conservation status
- Least Concern (IUCN 3.1)

Scientific classification
- Kingdom: Animalia
- Phylum: Chordata
- Class: Actinopterygii
- Division: Teleostei
- Order: Centrarchiformes
- Genus: Percalates
- Species: P. colonorum

Binomial name
- Percalates colonorum (Günther, 1863)

Synonyms
- Lates colonorum Günther, 1863; Macquaria colonorum (Günther, 1863); Lates antarcticus Castelnau, 1872; Lates victoriae Castelnau, 1872; Dules novemaculeatus alta Klunzinger, 1872; Lates curtus Castelnau, 1875; Lates ramsayi W. J. Macleay, 1881

= Estuary perch =

Species of ray-finned fish

The estuary perch (Percalates colonorum) is a species of ray-finned fish endemic to south-eastern Australia, where it prefers brackish waters such as the tidal reaches of coastal lakes, rivers, and streams.

== Appearance ==
It is very similar to and very closely related to its sister species, the Australian bass, Percalates novemaculeata, differing in having a slightly more "scooped" forehead and reaching a larger length of 75 cm (30 in). The species also differ in that Australian bass generally inhabit freshwater reaches during the non-spawning months, while estuary perch generally inhabit reaches subject to some tidal movement. Most individuals only reach around 40 cm (16 in). The greatest recorded weight for a specimen of this species is 10 kg (22 lb), there is very little evidence for this, most people assume it was a typo i.e. it was 10 lb and not 10 kg.

== Reproduction ==
Estuary perch breed in winter at the same time as Australian bass, and are similarly sexually dimorphic, with females larger than males. Females reach sexual maturity at older ages and larger sizes than males. In Victoria, estuary perch/Australian bass hybrids are regularly recorded; most hybrids appear to be reproductively viable.

Spawning occurs at the mouths of estuaries, rivers, and streams during winter and spring when water temperatures are 14–19 °C (57–66 °F). In New South Wales, this occurs from July to August, while in the western regions of Victorian waters this happens from November to December.

Eggs are semi-buoyant, non-adhesive, and 1.3–2.4 mm (0.051–0.094 in) in diameter. They hatch into larvae after 2–3 days.

== Age ==
Estuary perch, as with many other native fish of south-eastern Australia, are very long-lived. Longevity is a survival strategy to ensure that most adults participate in at least one exceptional spawning and recruitment event, which are often linked to unusually wet La Niña years and may only occur every one or two decades. Maximum age so far recorded is 41 years.

== Fishing ==
Historical fishing accounts, primarily in newspapers, show the species was once known as "Gippsland Perch" and was a renowned and highly praised angling fish in Victoria in the late 1800s and early 1900s. It was frequently targeted with fly fishing tackle. Such accounts and articles document a very wide range and immense abundance, and also demonstrate the species has undergone an immense historical decline in range and abundance. Nevertheless, the estuary perch remains a popular albeit somewhat specialist game fish in its surviving range in the states of Victoria (particularly) and New South Wales. The fish was once caught commercially with various types of netting during their winter spawning migrations. Recent declining numbers mean the species is now theoretically protected from commercial fishing, while bag limits and closed seasons apply with recreational fishing. However, an absence of larger, older (>10 years) individuals in the populations from the two rivers with a history of commercial fishing shows high commercial fishing bycatch of the species is still happening.
