= Goat blanket =

Blanket for protecting goats from severe weather

A goat blanket, or goat coat, is a blanket or coat covering intended to keep a domestic goat warm, or otherwise protected from the weather. They can vary from simple fabric covers, to specially fitted garments which wrap securely around the body and neck, while still allowing the animal free movement. Most goats develop a thick coat of fur in the fall months, but some types of goats do not, so they need external protection.

== See also ==
- Horse blanket
- Rug (animal covering)
