= Dog coat (disambiguation) =

A dog coat is a dog's fur or hair.

Dog coat may also refer to:

- Rug (animal covering), jacket or blanket for a dog
- Fur clothing, made from the fur of a dog,

== See also ==
- Chiengora
