= List of acts of the Parliament of Victoria from 1920 =

This is a list of acts of the Parliament of Victoria, Australia for the year 1920.

== 1920 ==
| Short title, or popular name | Citation | Royal assent |
Long title
| Health Act 1919 | 10 Geo. V. No. 3041 | 6 January 1920 |
An Act to amend the Law relating to Public Health.
| Municipal Loans (Commonwealth) Act 1919 | 10 Geo. V. No. 3042 | 6 January 1920 |
An Act to provide for Special Loans by the Treasurer of Victoria to Municipalities out of Moneys advanced by the Commonwealth of Australia.
| Agricultural Education Act 1919 | 10 Geo. V. No. 3043 | 6 January 1920 |
An Act relating to Agricultural Education.
| Constitution Act Amendment Act 1919 | 10 Geo. V. No. 3044 | 6 January 2020 |
An Act relating to the Leader of His Majesty's Opposition in the Legislative Assembly.
| Rating of Unimproved Values Act 1919 | 10 Geo. V. No. 3045 | 6 January 1920 |
An Act to amend the Rating on Unimproved Values Act 1915. (Note: Rating on Unimproved Values Act 1915 (6 Geo. V. No. 2817))
| | 10 Geo. V. No. 3046 | 6 January 1920 |
An Act to apply a sum out of the Consolidated Revenue to the service of the year ending on the thirtieth day of June One thousand nine hundred and twenty and to appropriate the Supplies granted in this Session of Parliament.
| Public Service Act 1919 | 10 Geo. V. No. 3047 | 6 January 1920 |
An Act to amend the Public Service Acts.
| Factories and Shops Act 1919 | 10 Geo. V. No. 3048 | 6 January 1920 |
An Act to amend the Factories and Shops Acts.
| | 11 Geo. V. No. 3050 | 2 July 1920 |
An Act to apply out of the Consolidated Revenue the sum of Two millions two hundred and eighty-one thousand two hundred and forty-seven pounds to the service of the year One thousand nine hundred and twenty and One thousand nine hundred and twenty-one.
| | 11 Geo. V. No. 3051 | 21 July 1920 |
An Act to apply out of the Consolidated Revenue the sum of Nine hundred and fifty-five thousand one hundred and fourteen pounds to the service of the year One thousand nine hundred and nineteen and One thousand nine hundred and twenty.
| Victorian Government Stock Act 1920 (repealed) | 11 Geo. V. No. 3053 | 31 August 1920 |
An Act to amend the Victorian Government Stock Act 1912. (Note: Victorian Government Stock Act 1912 (3 Geo. V. No. 2403)) (Repealed by Treasury Legislation (Repeal) Act 2005 (No. 73 of 2005))
| Victorian Government Debentures Regulation Act 1920 (repealed) | 11 Geo. V. No. 3054 | 7 September 1920 |
An Act to amend the Victorian Government Debentures Regulation Act 1912. (Note: Victorian Government Debentures Regulation Act 1912 (3 Geo. V. No. 2404)) (Repealed by Treasury Legislation (Repeal) Act 2005 (No. 73 of 2005))
| | 11 Geo. V. No. 3058 | 9 September 1920 |
An Act to apply out of the Consolidated Revenue the sum of Two million two hundred and fifty-seven thousand eight hundred and sixty-eight pounds to the service of the year One thousand nine hundred and twenty and One thousand nine hundred and twenty-one.
| Special Funds Act 1920 (repealed) | 11 Geo. V. No. 3067 | 28 September 1920 |
An Act relating to certain "Special Funds." (Repealed by Public Account (Trust Funds) Act 1982 (No. 9861))
| Anglo-Persian Oil Company's Act 1920 (repealed) | 11 Geo. V. No. 3075 | 28 September 1920 |
An Act Relating to the Anglo- Persian Oil Company Limited. (Repealed by Statute Law Revision Act 1995 (No. 11 of 1995))
| Wheat Marketing and Transportation Act 1920 | 11 Geo. V. No. 3076 | 28 September 1920 |
An Act to confer certain Powers on the Government of Victoria in regard to the Marketing of the Wheat Harvest of the Season 1920-1921 and for other purposes.
| Albert Park Land Act 1920 (repealed) | 11 Geo. V. No. 3079 | 29 September 1920 |
An Act to amend the Albert Park Land Act 1917. (Note: Albert Park Land Act 1917 (8 Geo. V. No. 2923)) (Repealed by Statute Law Revision Act 1984 (No. 10087))
| Castlemaine Lands Act 1920 (repealed) | 11 Geo. V. No. 3080 | 28 September 1920 |
An Act to revoke the Permanent Reservation and Crown Grant of certain Land at Castlemaine as a Site for Municipal Purposes and the Crown Grant of certain other Land at Castlemaine as a Site for a General Market and for a Water Reservoir and for other purposes. (Repealed by Statute Law Revision Act 1984 (No. 10087))
| Municipal Loans (Commonwealth) Act 1920 | 11 Geo. V. No. 3081 | 28 September 1920 |
An Act to amend the Municipal Loans (Commonwealth) Act 1919. (Note: Municipal Loans (Commonwealth) Act 1919 (10 Geo. V. No. 3042))
| | 11 Geo. V. No. 3083 | 12 November 1920 |
An Act to apply out of the Consolidated Revenue the sum of Nine hundred and fifty-nine thousand three hundred and forty-one pounds to the service of the year One thousand nine hundred and twenty and One thousand nine hundred and twenty-one.
| Morwell Brown Coal Railway Construction Act 1920 (repealed) | 11 Geo. V. No. 3084 | 10 December 1920 |
An Act to authorize the Construction by the State of a Connecting Line of Railway to the Morwell Brown Coal Workings. (Repealed by Transport Act 1983 (No. 9921))
| Municipalities Celebrations and War Memorials Act 1920 | 11 Geo. V. No. 3086 | 10 December 1920 |
An Act to authorize and validate certain Expenditure by Councils of Municipalities in connexion with the Visit of His Royal Highness the Prince of Wales and Memorials in connexion with the Recent War.
| | 11 Geo. V. No. 3087 | 10 December 1920 |
An Act to apply out of the Consolidated Revenue the sum of Nine hundred and forty-one thousand three hundred and sixty-two pounds to the service of the year One thousand nine hundred and twenty and One thousand nine hundred and twenty-one.
| Great Ocean Road (Lands Sale) Act 1920 (repealed) | 11 Geo. V. No. 3094 | 24 December 1920 |
An Act relating to the Sale of certain Crown Lands in the County of Polwarth for the purposes of the Construction of a Highway to be known as the Great Ocean Road. (Repealed by Statute Law Revision Act 1984 (No. 10087))
| Anglo-Persian Oil Company's Act 1920 (No. 2) (repealed) | 11 Geo. V. No. 3097 | 24 December 1920 |
An Act to amend the First Schedule to the Anglo-Persian Oil Company's Act 1920. (Note: Anglo-Persian Oil Company's Act 1920 (11 Geo. V. No. 3075)) (Repealed by Statute Law Revision Act 1995 (No. 11 of 1995))
| Commonwealth Powers (Air Navigation) Act 1920 (repealed) | 11 Geo. V. No. 3108 | 24 December 1920 |
An Act to refer to the Parliament of the Commonwealth certain matters in connexion with Air Navigation. (Repealed by Air Navigation Act 1937 (No. 4502)
| Black Rock to Beaumaris Electric Street Railway Act 1920 | 11 Geo. V. No. 3110 | 24 December 1920 |
An Act to authorize the Construction by the State of an Electric Street Railway from Black Rock to Beaumaris.
| North Carlton Lands Act 1920 (repealed) | 11 Geo. V. No. 3114 | 24 December 1920 |
An Act to revoke the Permanent Reservation and Crown Grant of certain Lands situate at North Carlton in the City of Melbourne as a Site for Market and other Municipal Purposes and to provide for the closing of a certain Right-of-way and of Portions of certain Streets and certain other Rights-of-way at North Carlton aforesaid and to re-vest certain Lands in the Crown and for other purposes. (Repealed by Statute Law Revision Act 1984 (No. 10087))
| | 11 Geo. V. No. 3117 | 24 December 1920 |
An Act to apply a sum out of the Consolidated Revenue to the service of the year ending on the thirtieth day of June One thousand nine hundred and twenty-one and to appropriate the Supplies granted in this and the last preceding Session of Parliament.
| Companies Act 1920 | 11 Geo. V. No. | |
| Country Roads Act 1920 | 11 Geo. V. No. | |
| Discharged Soldiers Settlement Act 1920 | 11 Geo. V. No. | |
| Divorce (Insanity) Act 1920 | 11 Geo. V. No. | |
| Electricity Supply Loan Act 1920 | 11 Geo. V. No. | |
| Factories and Shops Act 1920 | 11 Geo. V. No. | |
| Factories and Shops Act 1920 (No. 2) | 11 Geo. V. No. | |
| Fallowing Advances Act 1920 | 11 Geo. V. No. | |
| Farm Produce Agents Act 1920 | 11 Geo. V. No. | |
| Fruit Act 1920 | 11 Geo. V. No. | |
| Geelong (Kardinia Park) Land Act 1920 | 11 Geo. V. No. | |
| Geelong Waterworks and Sewerage Act 1920 | 11 Geo. V. No. | |
| Housing and Reclamation Act 1920 | 11 Geo. V. No. | |
| Income Tax Act 1920 | 11 Geo. V. No. | |
| Instruments Act 1920 | 11 Geo. V. No. | |
| Juries Act 1920 | 11 Geo. V. No. | |
| Land Act 1920 | 11 Geo. V. No. | |
| Land Tax Act 1920 | 11 Geo. V. No. | |
| Marine Act 1920 | 11 Geo. V. No. | |
| Melbourne and Metropolitan Tramways Act 1920 | 11 Geo. V. No. | |
| Mental Treatment Act 1920 | 11 Geo. V. No. | |
| Metropolitan Gas Company's Act 1920 | 11 Geo. V. No. | |
| Mildura Irrigation Trusts Act 1920 | 11 Geo. V. No. | |
| Municipal Endowment Act 1920 | 11 Geo. V. No. | |
| Pharmaceutical Chemists Act 1920 | 11 Geo. V. No. | |
| Poisons Act 1920 | 11 Geo. V. No. | |
| Primary Products Advances Act 1920 | 11 Geo. V. No. | |
| Public Service Act 1920 | 11 Geo. V. No. | |
| Public Service Act 1920 (No. 2) | 11 Geo. V. No. | |
| Public Works Loan Application Act 1920 | 11 Geo. V. No. | |
| Railway Loan Application Act 1920 | 11 Geo. V. No. | |
| Railways (Payments) Act 1920 | 11 Geo. V. No. | |
| Railways Act 1920 | 11 Geo. V. No. | |
| Railways Standing Committee Act 1920 | 11 Geo. V. No. | |
| Rating on Unimproved Values Act 1920 | 11 Geo. V. No. | |
| River Murray Waters Act 1920 | 11 Geo. V. No. | |
| Second-hand Dealers Act 1920 | 11 Geo. V. No. | |
| Spotswood Land Act 1920 | 11 Geo. V. No. | |
| State Electricity Commission Act 1920 | 11 Geo. V. No. | |
| State Savings Bank Act 1920 | 11 Geo. V. No. | |
| State Savings Bank Act 1920 (No. 2) | 11 Geo. V. No. | |
| Surplus Revenue Act 1920 | 11 Geo. V. No. | |
| Tragowel Land Act 1920 | 11 Geo. V. No. | |
| Trusts Act 1920 | 11 Geo. V. No. | |
| Unauthorized Documents Act 1920 | 11 Geo. V. No. | |
| Victorian Loan Act 1920 | 11 Geo. V. No. | |
| Victorian Loan Act 1920 (No. 2) | 11 Geo. V. No. | |
| Water Supply Loans Application Act 1920 | 11 Geo. V. No. | |

== Sources ==
- "1920 Victorian Historical Acts". AustLII.
