= Albert Park and Lake =

Lake in Melbourne, Australia

Albert Park
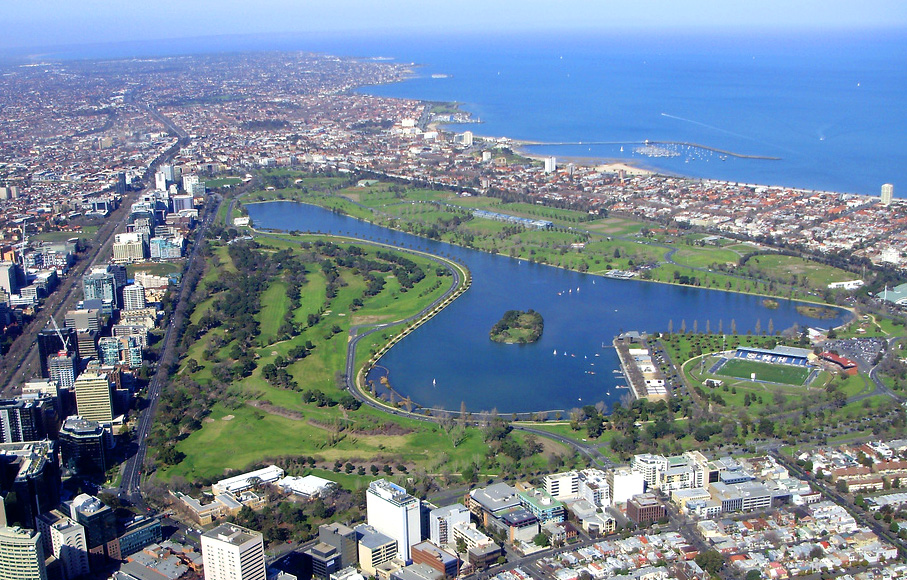
- Aerial view of Albert Park and Lake

- Location within Melbourne
- Interactive map of Albert Park
- Type: Urban park; Artificial lake; Sports venue
- Location: Melbourne, Victoria, Australia
- Coordinates: 37°50′53″S 144°58′16″E
- Area: 225 ha (560 acres)
- Established: 22 July 1862
- Opened: 1864; 162 years ago
- Etymology: Prince Albert
- Owner: Victorian Government (as Crown land)
- Operator: Parks Victoria
- Visitors: c.6 million (in 2018)
- Status: Open
- Paths: Sealed shared pedestrian / bicycle paths
- Terrain: Flat plains; large lake
- Water: Albert Park Lake
- Vegetation: European themed; Australian native; grasslands
- Public transit: – Anzac; –; –
- Landmarks: Albert Park Lake; Albert Park Circuit; Melbourne Sports and Aquatic Centre; Lakeside Stadium; Junction Oval; Albert Park Golf Course; Albert Park Yacht Club; Albert Sailing Club
- Facilities: Barbecues; cafe/restaurant; picnic areas x9; playgrounds; sporting fields x21; toilets; walking tracks
- Website: parks.vic.gov.au

Albert Park Lake
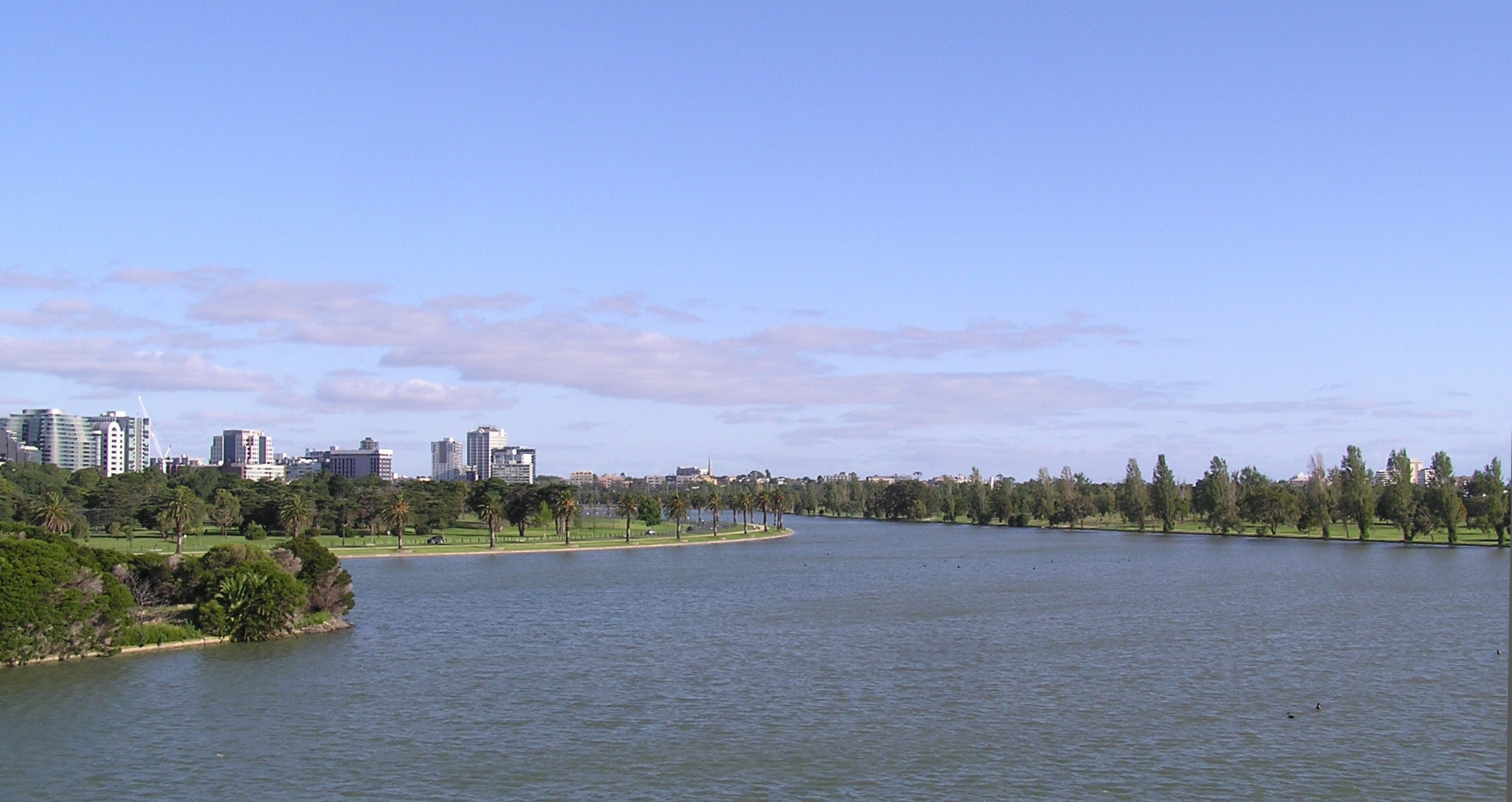
- Albert Park Lake looking south-east from the lookout tower at The Point restaurant.

- Location in Melbourne
- Interactive map of Albert Park Lake
- Location: Albert Park
- Coordinates: 37°50′47″S 144°58′12″E
- Type: Freshwater
- Max. length: 1.8 km (1.1 mi)
- Surface area: 49 ha (120 acres)
- Islands: Gunn; Mud

Albert Park is a 225-hectare (556-acre) urban park, freshwater (Note: In 1803, Charles Grimes, the surveyor-general of New South Wales, recorded that he came to “a salt lagoon about a mile long and quarter of a mile wide”.) artificial lake and sports venue, located in the eponymous inner-city suburb of Melbourne, in Victoria, Australia. Situated within the City of Port Phillip, the park is located 3 kilometres (1.9 mi) south of the Melbourne city centre and surrounds the 1.8-kilometre-long (1 mi) Albert Park Lake, a 49-hectare (120-acre) Y-shaped artificial lake used both for water sports and public recreation.

The park is an important site for the sporting culture of Melbourne and Victoria, hosting multiple sports venues such as the Lakeside Stadium, the Melbourne Sports and Aquatic Centre and other indoor sports facilities, the Albert Park Yacht Club and Albert Sailing Club, the Albert Park Golf Course, a 4.7-kilometre (2.9 mi) walking track around the lake, numerous ovals, and the Albert Park Circuit—home of the Australian Grand Prix since 1996.

The park occupies a trapezoid superblock bordered by (clockwise from north) Albert Road, Queens Road, Fitzroy Street and Canterbury Road, and surrounding suburbs include Albert Park, Middle Park and St. Kilda West to the west and southwest; St Kilda to the south; South Yarra, Prahran and Windsor to the east; and South Melbourne to the north. The public-funded Mac.Robertson Girls' High School, one of Australia's top selective schools, is located to the northeastern corner of the park.

== History ==
The park is located on the traditional lands of the Bunurong.

Prior to European occupation in the 19th century, Albert Park was part of the extensive Yarra River delta, which involved vast areas of wetlands and sparse vegetation, interspersed with shallow lagoons, some of which were quite large, including the lagoon from which Albert Park Lake was created. The area was occupied by localised tribes of Indigenous Australians, the Boonwurrung people, for around 40,000+ years prior to European settlement, and was one of many sites around Melbourne where regular corroborees were held. Aboriginal and later European hunters caught wildfowl.

=== 19th and 20th centuries ===
Following British settlement from 1835 onwards, much of the Yarra River delta was drained to dry the land and enable agriculture, housing and grazing. Through the 1840s and 1850s, the area now occupied by Albert Park was unofficial parkland, used for military training, grazing and hunting. In 1864 the area had become a polluted swamp. It was officially proclaimed as a public park and named Albert Park in honour of Queen Victoria's consort, Prince Albert.

In the 1870s and 1880s boating enthusiasts urged the Victorian Government to create an ornamental lake by widening and deepening it, and a number of sailing and rowing clubhouses then clustered on its northern shores. By 1875, areas of the park along Queens Road and in St Kilda, had been sold off for housing and other uses, reducing the park from 385 to 231 hectares (950 to 570 acres).

Through much of the late 19th century, allotments were allocated for sporting facilities such as football, tennis, bowling, cricket and boating. Between 1873 and 1880, silt in the lagoons was excavated and used as infill around the lagoon itself to create a permanent lake. In 1890, water was diverted from the Yarra River to help fill the lake. In the late-19th and early-20th centuries, the park was used as a tip, a camp for the armed services, scenic drives, picnics, and many other forms of recreation.

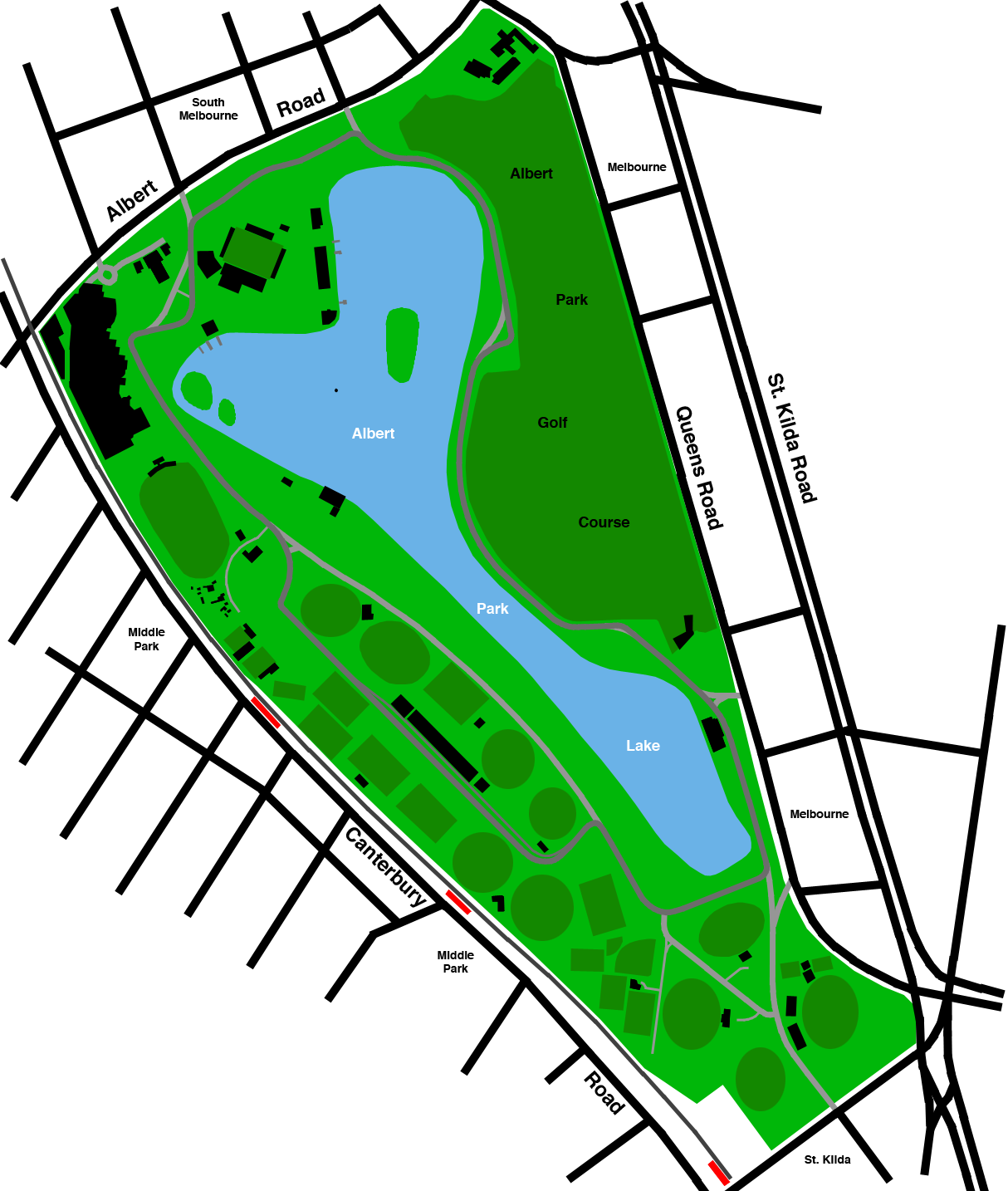
Map of Albert Park and Lake

In 1882, 1918 and 1935, adjoining educational institutions acquired land from the park, to much opposition at the time. During World War II, the Australian Army occupied large areas of land in the park: this land was given back to the park during the 1950s and 1960s. From 1953 to 1958, motor racing was held within the park, including the 1953 and 1956 Australian Grands Prix, around the lake, until it was moved to the Phillip Island Grand Prix Circuit. Through much of the 1960s, 1970s, and 1980s, although by this time the park was home to over 100 sporting clubs, general park maintenance was neglected by an over-restrictive management and funding became hard to come by, finances of any significance only being collected from the two restaurants in the park. During the 20th century local children spent their days yabbying, paddling and boating on the lake.

During the early 1990s, the lake was drained to remove weed infestations, rubbish, and other debris that had accumulated over the years, and to encourage birds to return. The park was reclassified as a sporting reserve and, in 1996, the Australian Grand Prix moved from the Adelaide Street Circuit to a reconstructed Albert Park Circuit, loosely following the 1950s configuration. This was met with much opposition, and the project went ahead and a host of sporting facilities were subsequently constructed and funding allocated to improve the parklands followed.

=== 21st century ===
Albert Park is enjoyed by approximately five million visitors annually. Vestiges of Albert Park's Aboriginal history still remain, the most noticeable being the large ancient river red gum tree, reputed to be the site of many corroborees. It is thought to be over 300 years old, the oldest remnant tree in the Port Phillip area, located next to Junction Oval on the corner of Fitzroy Street and Queens Road, St Kilda. The Clarendon Street gates were originally built of wooden pickets in 1910, they were cast in wrought iron in 1939 and can still be seen today.

In 2018, Albert Park attracted c.6 million visitors.

== Habitat and fauna ==
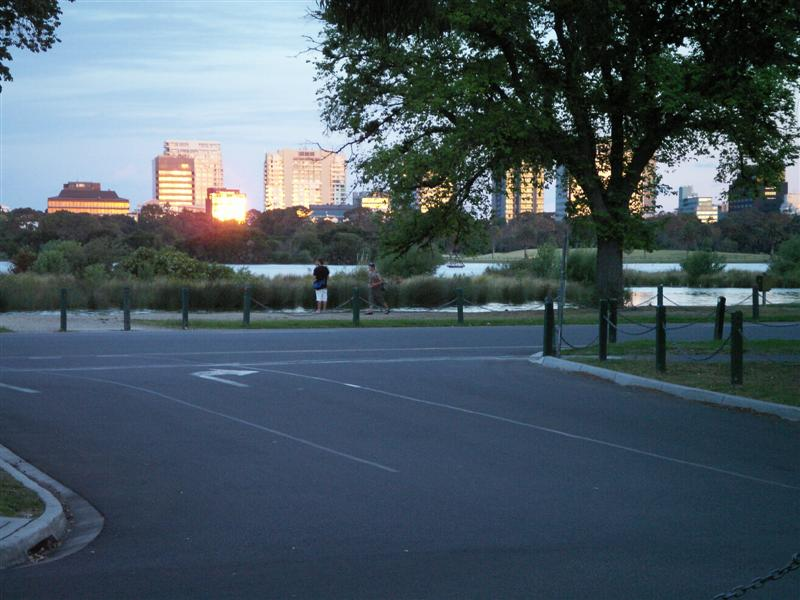
Aughtie Drive (part of the Grand Prix track) looking east over Gunn Island toward 470 St Kilda Road, St Kilda (main reflection), in the St Kilda Road residential and office precinct

The parkland, Albert Park Lake and Gunn Island provide a grassy wetland habitat for nearly two hundred bird species, both resident and transient. A 1990 study recorded 31 bird species as breeding in the park with a total of 21 these indigenous species. Migratory species include the flame robin, white-throated needletail and sacred kingfisher.

A population of highly resident black swans (Cygnus atratus) are a popular feature of the lake. The swans breed on Gunn Island and Mud Island, away from predators that can attack the eggs on the mainland. The University of Melbourne has a long-standing project to study this population of swans. Swans are periodically captured, measured, tagged, and released. The neck collars are not harmful to the birds and these swans can be identified from the shore by their black and white neck tags.

Locally rare native bird species that have been recorded in the park include Eastern great egret, Australasian darter, Spotless crake, Great crested grebe, Royal spoonbill, and Caspian tern, while Little ravens, Australian magpies, Long-billed corella, Sulphur-crested cockatoo, Red-rumped parrots and Magpie-larks are common. Common lake birds include Black swans, Maned ducks, Pacific black ducks, as well as Australasian grebe, Eurasian coots, Dusky moorhen, Australasian swamphen, and all four freshwater cormorant species. Feral common mynas and common starling are also numerous in the park. Feral mute swans were removed from the park between the 1980s and 1990s.

Native mammals include common brushtail possums, common ringtail possums and water rat. Common bent-wing bat, white-striped free-tailed bat and Gould's wattled bat have also been recorded in the park. Feral black rats are also common in the park. Foxes have also been spotted on occasion at night.

Several reptiles and amphibians, such as the marbled gecko and eastern long-necked turtle, make their home in the park.

The lake is home to some stocked freshwater fish species. The Department of Primary Industries released native golden perch for recreational fishing purposes, and the Victorian Fisheries Authority (VFA) periodically introduces hatchery-raised rainbow trout as part of the Victoria State Government's A$35 million "Go Fishing Victoria" initiative. The European carp, deemed a noxious pest in Australia although easily the most popular freshwater game fish elsewhere in the Old World, are the most commonly found fish in the lake and is subject to control programs.

A vegetation survey in 1992 found 117 species of plants, a mixture of native and exotic species. A native revegetation area in the south east corner of the park features a large ancient river red gum known as the Corroboree Tree, a heritage registered eucalypt of cultural significance as a pre-European gathering place.

== Facilities and features ==
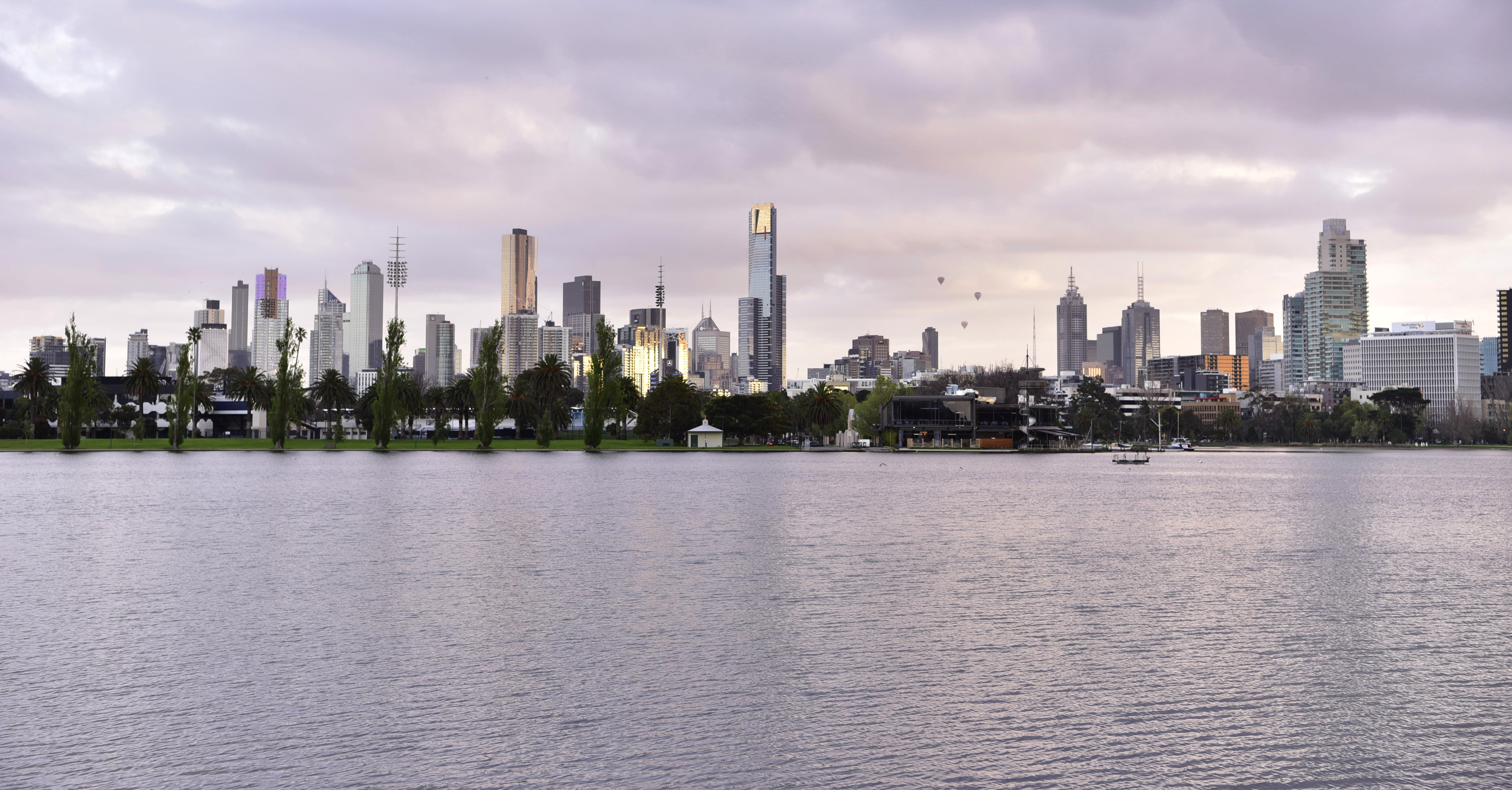
Albert Park Lake, looking towards Melbourne city centre

There are nine separate picnic areas, most with barbecues, shelters and toilets (4 of which are handicap accessible). There is a vast network of sealed and unsealed, shared pedestrian/bicycle paths, centred on a main route that circles the lake. There are several playgrounds of varying sizes, the park also hosts many large sporting facilities, including:

- Melbourne Sports & Aquatic Centre - International class swimming and sports facilities.
- Lakeside Stadium - Home ground of Athletics Australia, Athletics Victoria and South Melbourne FC.
- Albert Park Public Golf Course - including a golf driving range on the opposite side of the lake.
- Junction Oval - historic sporting ground.
- Several boating and sailing clubs - located on the north and eastern sides of the lake.
- Several rowing clubs - at either ends of the lake, specifically [2014] APSMRC [Albert Park South Melbourne], Caulfield Grammar School, Argonauts, YWCA, Korowa GS, Wesley College, Brighton Grammar School.
- Restaurants and Function Centres - including the Powerhouse, the Point and Carousel.
- Various sporting grounds/ovals - including Harry Trott Oval, Holdsworth Pavilion, Ross Gregory Oval, Stuart King Pavilion, Ian Johnson Oval, Bill Woodfull Oval, Lindsay Hassett Oval, and several smaller bowls clubs, tennis clubs, cricket ovals, soccer and rugby fields located in the south western side of the park.

=== Other features ===
- Gunn Island - a large artificial island in the north-east portion of the lake.
- Mud Island - an artificial island in the north-west portion of the lake.
- Stormwater Treatment Ponds - two sets of reedbeds located either end of the lake.
- The Aquatower - a large waterspout/fountain, which is currently turned off due to water restrictions.

== Events ==
The Australian Grand Prix is held around the Albert Park Circuit around the lake. In 2020 and 2021 the event was cancelled due to the COVID-19 pandemic. Every May the RSPCA holds the Million Paws Walk to raise needed income for their work with animals. The Albert Sailing Club holds regular regattas on Saturdays. The Albert Park Yacht club, established in 1871 and the oldest continuing yacht club in Victoria, runs sailing classes over winter months on Albert Park lake and also has competitive sailing on Saturdays. Albert Park is home to a 5-kilometre (3.1 mi) parkrun event. Albert Melbourne parkrun starts at 8am every Saturday from the Coot Picnic area. Albert Park is used a by a number of radio control model boat clubs throughout the year, except when access is unavailable due to the Grand Prix. This includes Task Force 72, Australia's only national model boat club.

== Gallery ==
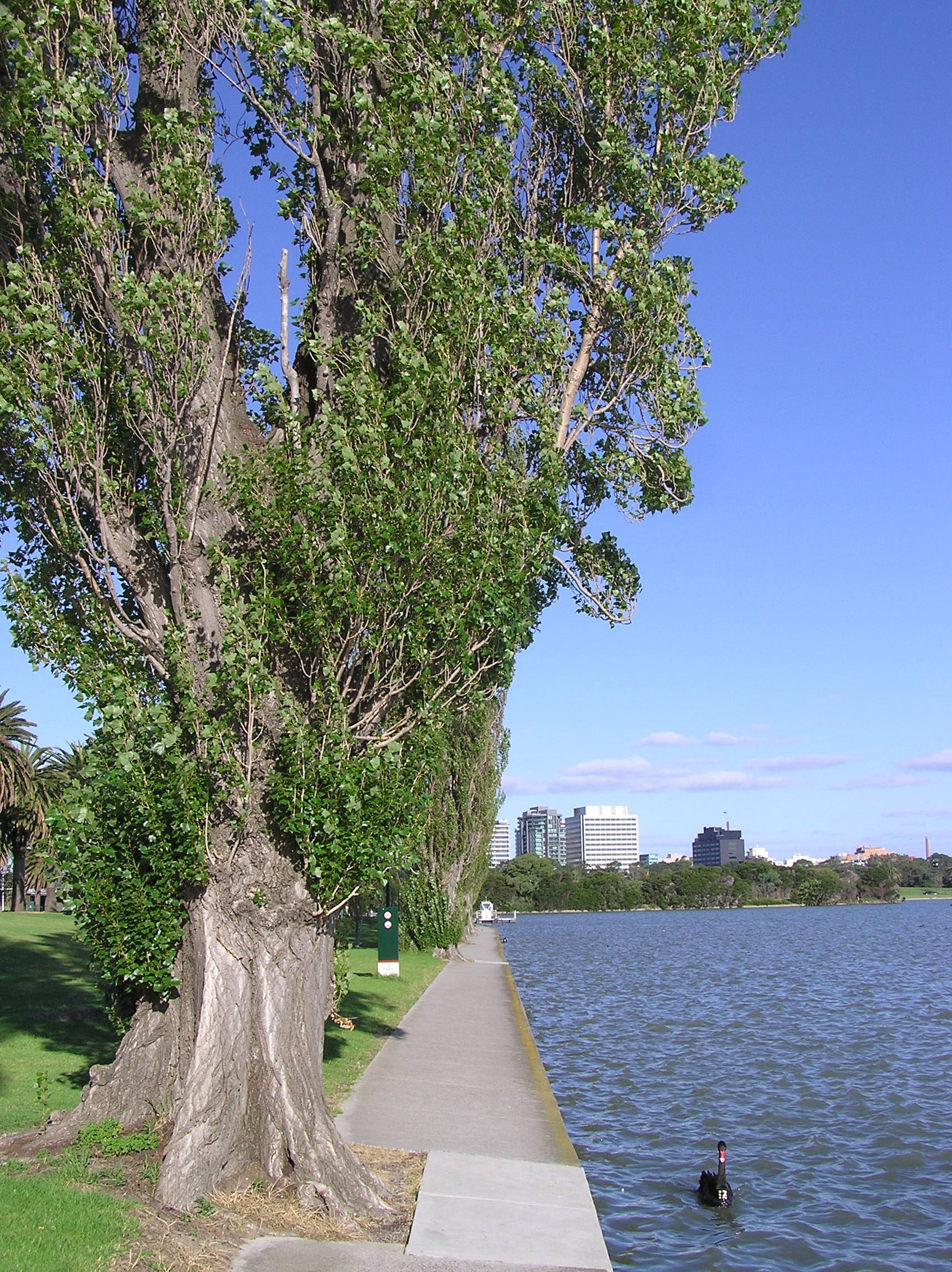
Albert Park Lake, looking due east past The Point to Gunn Island

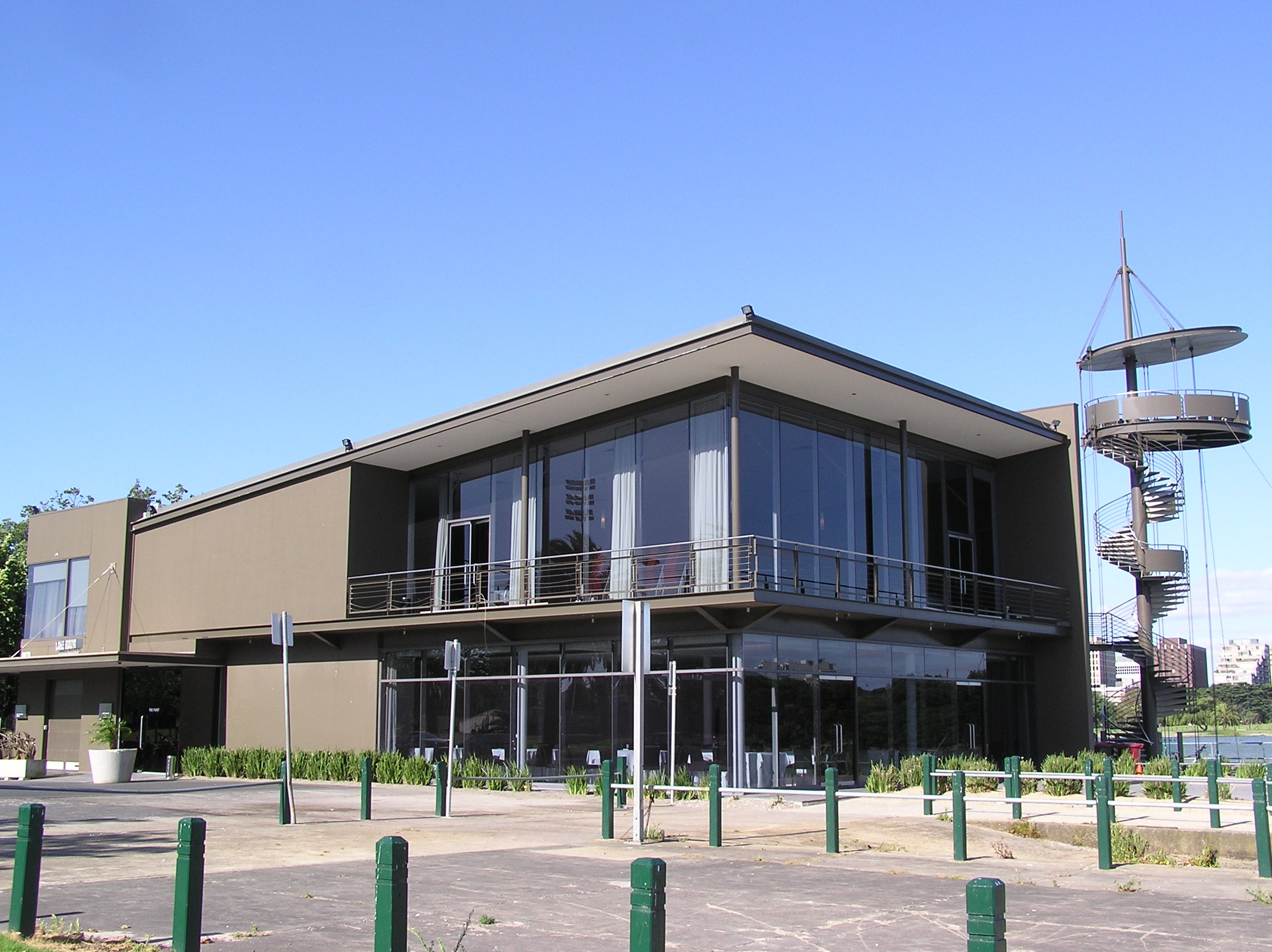
The Point Restaurant

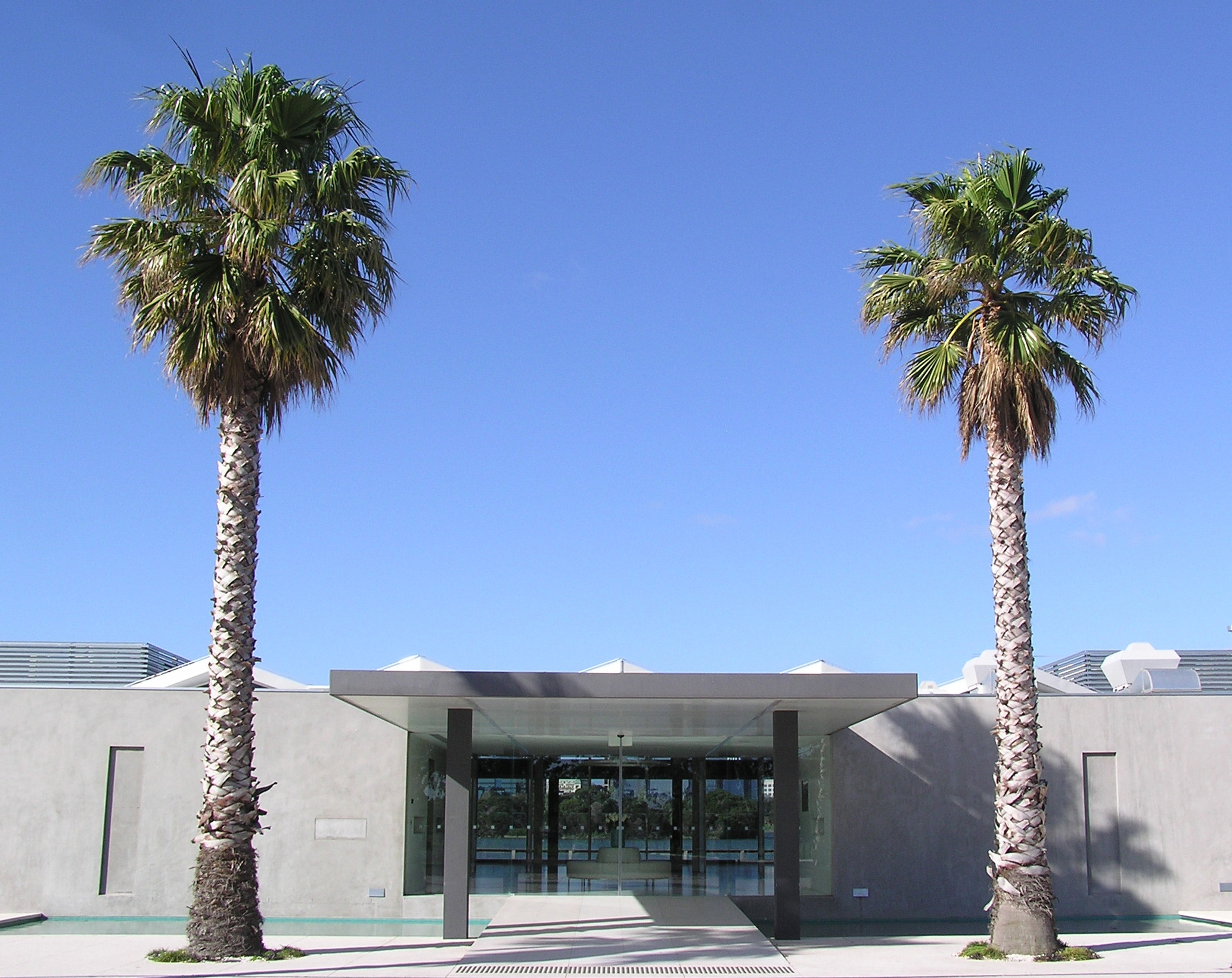
Carousel events venue entrance

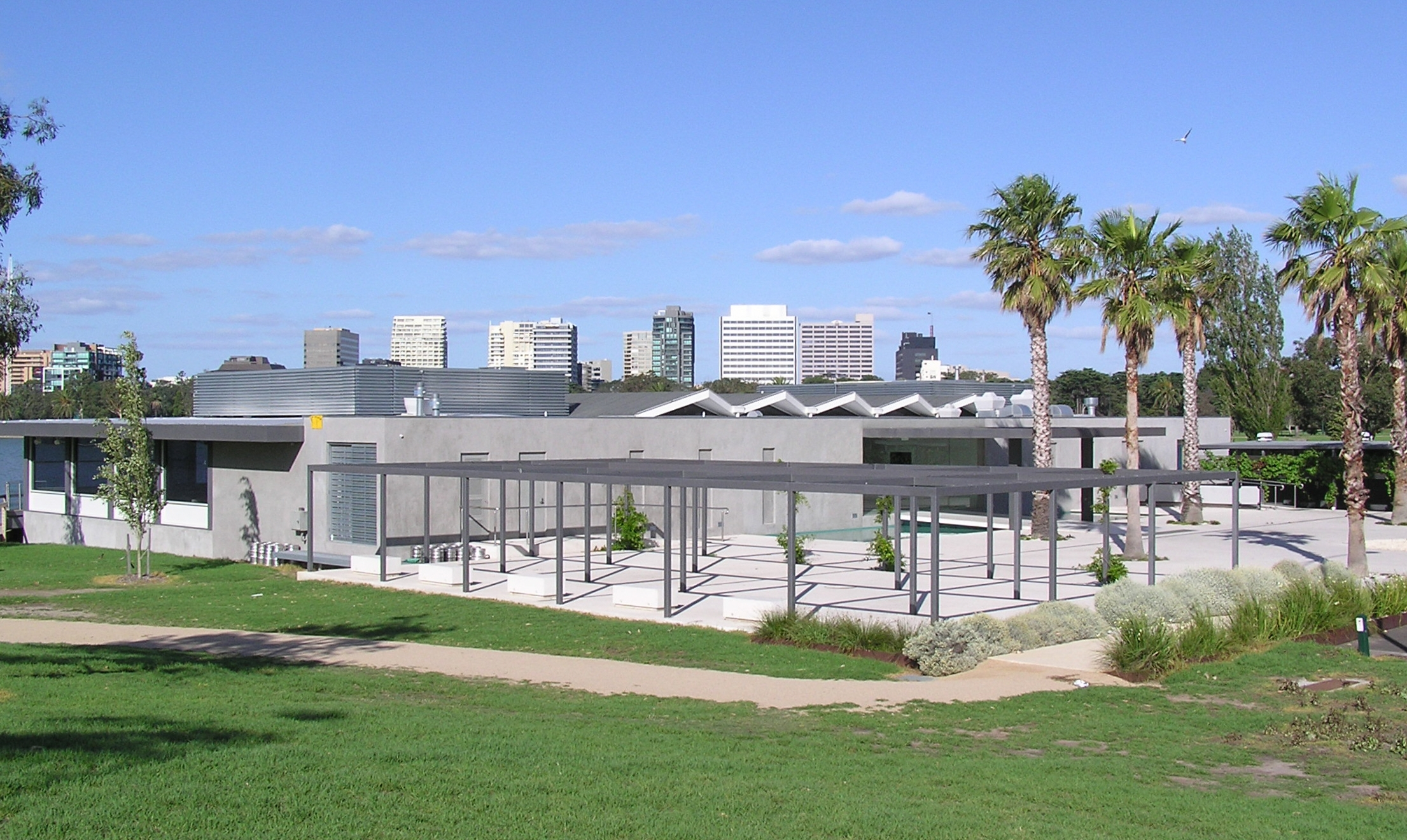
Carousel outdoor open space

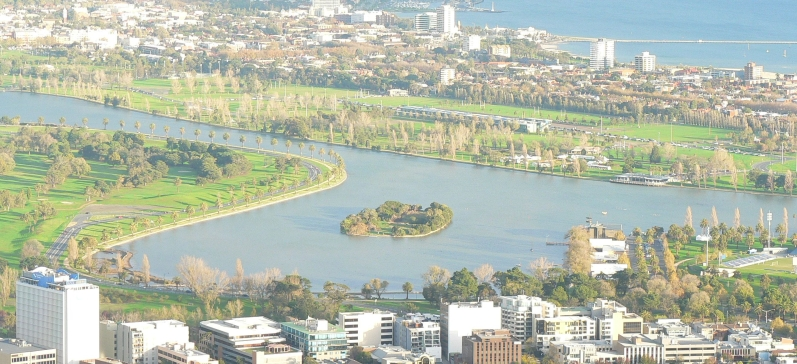
Lake and surrounds as viewed southward from the Eureka Tower observation deck

== See also ==
- Parks and gardens of Melbourne
- Lakes and reservoirs of Melbourne
- List of sports venues in Melbourne
