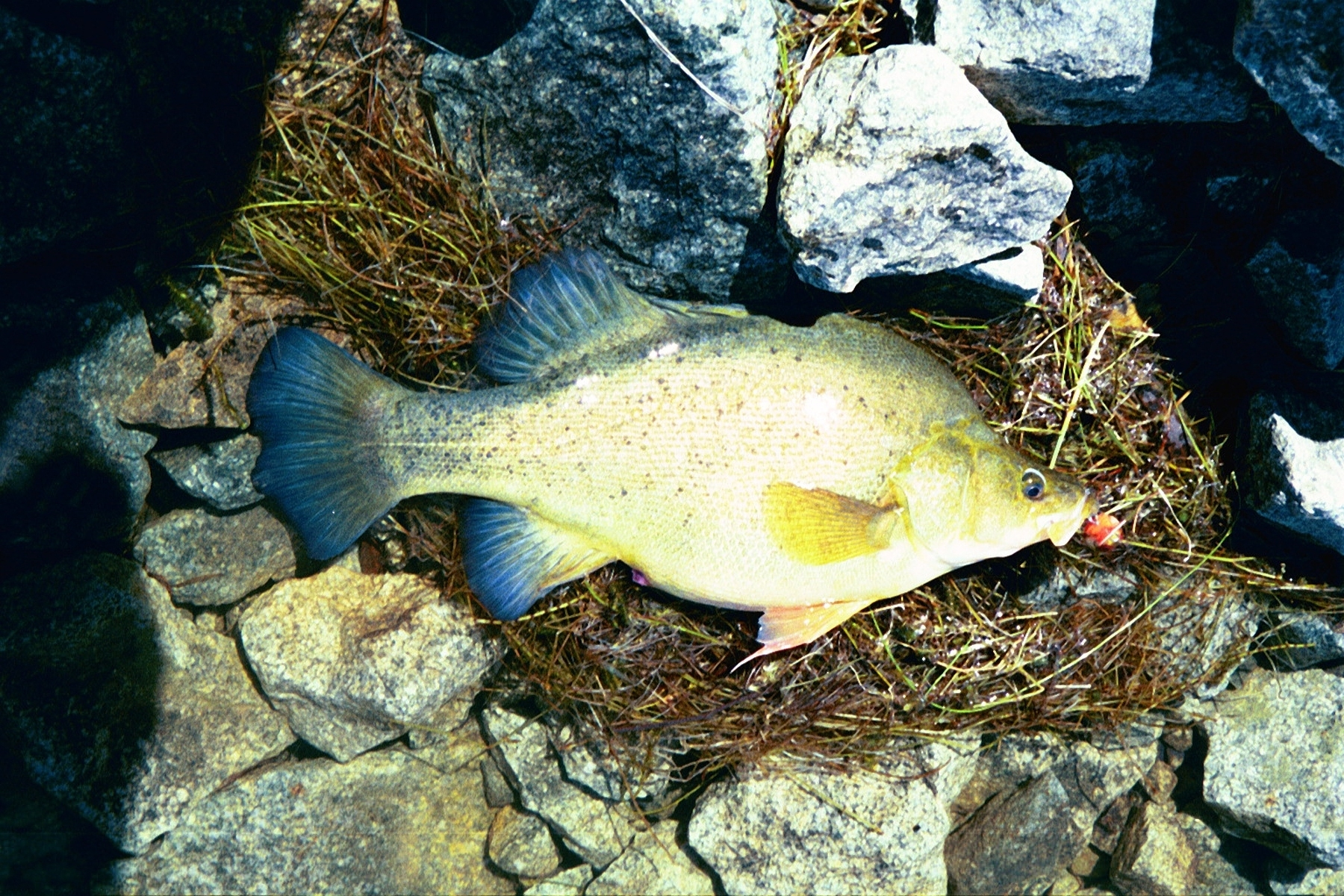
- A large, stocked, female golden perch caught from an impoundment: The fishing lure is still in its mouth.

Conservation status
- Least Concern (IUCN 3.1)

Scientific classification
- Kingdom: Animalia
- Phylum: Chordata
- Class: Actinopterygii
- Division: Teleostei
- Order: Centrarchiformes
- Family: Percichthyidae
- Genus: Macquaria
- Species: M. ambigua

Binomial name
- Macquaria ambigua (J. Richardson, 1845)

Synonyms
- Datnia ambigua J. Richardson, 1845; Plectroplites ambiguus (J. Richardson, 1845); Ctenolates macquariensis Günther, 1871; Dules auratus Castelnau, 1872; Dules flavescens Castelnau, 1875

= Golden perch =

Species of fish

The golden perch (Macquaria ambigua) is a medium-sized, yellow or gold-coloured species of Australian freshwater fish found primarily in the Murray-Darling River system. A subspecies is found in the Lake Eyre-Cooper Creek system, and another subspecies, suspected to be ancestral to all other populations, is found in the Fitzroy River system in Queensland. Other common names for golden perch are "goldens", "yellowbelly" and "callop", the last generally used only in South Australia.

Golden perch are not a true perch, which belongs to the genus Perca from the family Percidae, but a member of the Percichthyidae (temperate perch) family. This relatively widespread and widely stocked species is an important angling sport fish in Australia.

== Description ==
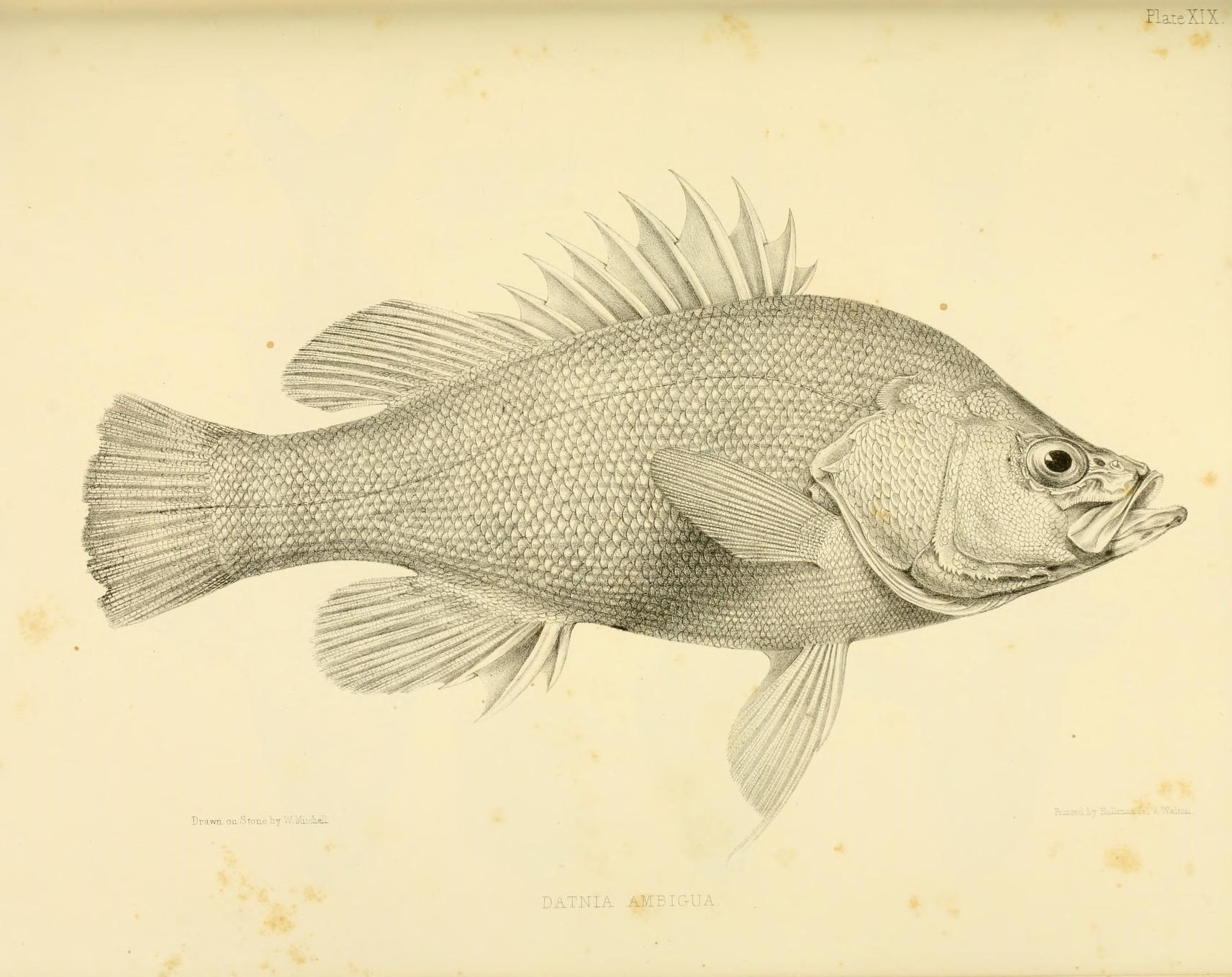
Scientific illustration of Macquaria ambigua.

Golden perch are medium-sized fish, commonly 30–40 cm and 1–2 kg in rivers. Fish from rivers are smaller and somewhat streamlined — fish in man-made impoundments are much deeper-bodied and show much greater average and maximum sizes. In rivers, has been recorded to 9 kg, in impoundments to 15 kg. A 24-kg fish caught from Kow Swamp, Victoria in the early 1900s, and labelled and sold as a "Murray perch", is often referred to as the largest recorded golden perch, but this record is doubtful — this record grossly exceeds all other size records for golden perch, and the specimen in question is far more likely to have been a Murray cod (Maccullochella peelii), which grow to far larger sizes than golden perch.

Golden perch have an elongated, deep but laterally compressed body, with a sizeable mouth, small to moderate-sized eyes, a distinct curve to the forehead, and a distinct "hump" above the head. The opercula or gill covers possess a small, flat spine sharp enough to cut unwary fishermen's fingers. The caudal fin, soft dorsal fin, and anal fin are rounded. The spiny dorsal fin is short to moderate in length and strong. Golden perch vary from in colour from pale silvery-gold (turbid waters) to deep yellow/gold or bronze-black (very clear waters).

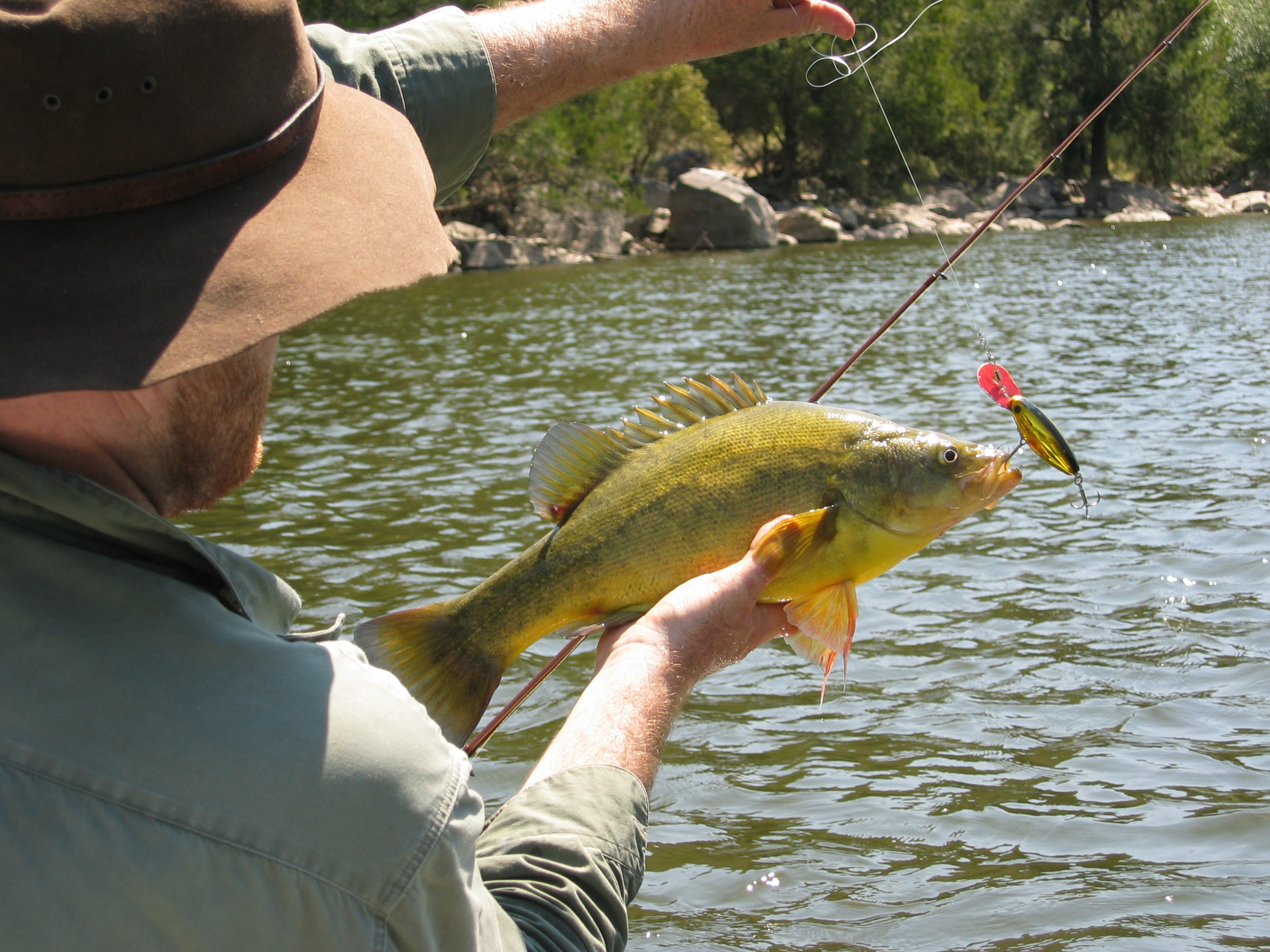
A wild golden perch from an upland river: Note the much leaner, slimmer shape of wild specimens and the intense golden colouration.

== Taxonomy ==
The genus name Macquaria derives from the Macquarie River, where the first species in the genus, the Macquarie perch (M. australasica), was collected. However, the genus name Macquaria was applied to golden perch much later. The naturalist Richardson actually named golden perch Datnia ambigua and applied the specific name ambigua (Latin for "doubtful") to the species because, as he states in his species description, he could not decide in which of two genera to place it, Dules (a marine Serranidae species) or Datnia (now various Terapontidae species):

"I have had much doubt as to whether this fish should be placed in the genus Dules, or Datnia. It agrees with the group of Dules that has two opercular points, in the number of dorsal rays, and in the presence of palatine teeth, but in general habit it is more like Datnia, strongly resembling it in the strength of its dorsal and anal spines, and in the number of rays in the anal. The only two specimens [8.5 and 14 inches standard length] I had the opportunity of examining are dried, and are both mutilated in the caudal fin, so that I am unable to describe the form of that member, and can give no anatomical details."

This choice of specific name was unwittingly appropriate. Golden perch are neither a serranid nor a terapontid, and Richardson also erroneously stated the golden perch's habitat was "Western Australia", when in fact the species is not naturally found in that state. (This error was corrected, presumably by Richardson himself, in at least one reprint of the publication in question.)

== Range ==
Golden perch are native primarily to lowland reaches of the Murray–Darling River system, but also extend far into slope habitats and occasionally even lower upland reaches. In the Murray–Darling system golden perch are often found in sympatry with Murray cod.

The Macquaria perches, of which golden perch are one, continue the trend present in Murray–Darling native fish genera of diversification into more generalist lowland species and more specialist upland species. Golden perch, M. ambigua, represent the lowland species, while the closely related Macquarie perch, M. australasica, is the more specialised upland species which used to inhabit the upland reaches of the southern Murray–Darling basin, although this endangered species has now been almost wholly displaced by introduced trout species, dams, and associated effects such as cold-water pollution, and habitat degradation/modification.

Like many Murray–Darling native fish, golden perch have crossed river catchments through natural river capture/connection events. Golden perch are found naturally in the Fitzroy–Dawson River in central Queensland and the internal Lake Eyre–Cooper Creek drainage system of Central Australia. The fish has also been successfully introduced to other river systems in the Northern Territory, Queensland, and New South Wales, confusing studies of the natural range. Introductions into Western Australia have been unsuccessful.

Both of these separate populations are at least subspecies, possibly separate species, due to isolation from Murray–Darling populations, genetic drift, and natural selection. The taxonomy of golden perch has not been updated to reflect this, although the term Macquaria ambigua oriens, denoting subspecies status, has recently appeared in literature discussing the Fitzroy–Dawson population. Some research indicates the Fitzroy River population is the ancestral golden perch population.

== Reproduction and biology ==
In the Murray River, wild male golden perch generally reach sexual maturity at 3 years of age and 32.5 cm in length, and wild female golden perch at 4 years of age and 40 cm in length. The latter fact is a concern given that minimum size limits for the species are currently less than 40 cm, at 30 cm.

Originally, temperatures close to 24 °C were considered necessary for golden perch to spawn, but as with all Murray-Darling fish species, multiple field studies have shown that their "required" spawning temperature is flexible and that they can and do spawn at lower temperatures. In the Barmah Forests region of the Murray River, for instance, fertilised drifting golden perch eggs have been netted in water temperatures as low as 16.9 degrees Celsius (full range 16.9 to 24.7 degrees). Golden perch have a flexible breeding strategy but generally (but not always) require a spring or summer flood or "fresh" (temporary, within-channel increase in flow) to stimulate spawning. Like some other primarily lowland native fish species of the Murray–Darling river system, these floods or freshes appear to be necessary for good survival and recruitment of spawned fish. Very small freshes appear to be sufficient for some spawning and recruitment, however.

Golden perch are highly fecund; females between 2.2 and 2.4 kg produce about half a million eggs per spawning event, with fish above 2.5 kg producing well in excess of this number. The eggs are generally planktonic, and hatch fairly quickly (24 to 36 hours).

Like other Macquaria species, sexual dimorphism is present, with females generally reaching much larger maximum sizes than males. Females also reach sexual maturity at older ages and larger sizes than males.

Very long migrations are part of the golden perch's ecology, particularly preceding spawning. Adult fish have been recorded migrating well over 1,000 km when flood conditions allow passage over weirs and other man-made obstructions. Smaller migrations are important in the ecology and dispersal of juvenile fish. The evidence suggests that before European settlement, huge shoals of golden perch roamed the entire lowland and slope reaches of the vast Murray-Darling River system, unimpeded. Thus, the gradual loss of fish passage through the numerous dams, weirs, locks, and other barriers (estimated at 4,000 in the Murray-Darling system) now present has had severe impacts on the species. Some major weirs have been remediated to provide fish passage, however.

Golden perch have unusually broad temperature limits, from 4 to 37 °C, and unusually high salinity limits for a freshwater fish, up to 33 parts per thousand.

Golden perch continue the trend, among many native fish of southeast Australia, of being very long-lived. Longevity is a survival strategy in the often challenging Australian environment which ensures that most adults participate in at least one exceptional spawning and recruitment event. These events are often linked to unusually wet La Niña years and may only occur every one or two decades. Maximum recorded age is 26 years.

== Diet ==
Adult golden perch are carnivores, feeding on smaller fish and macrocrustaceans, including yabbies, shrimp, frogs, small fish, and aquatic invertebrates.

== Angling ==
Generally a very good angling species (though renowned for being "moody"), golden perch are fished throughout their range. Baits include small yabbies and shrimp, as well as various types of deeper-running lures. Recreational harvest of the species is suspected to be significant.

== Conservation ==
Wild populations have declined significantly, and a number of populations lost in upper reaches of rivers, due to dams and weirs blocking migration, mitigating floods and freshes, regulating flows, and releasing unnaturally cold water ("thermal pollution"), all of which interfere with migration, spawning, and recruitment. They are listed under the Victorian Flora and Fauna Guarantee Act 1988 and classified as "Vulnerable" for management purposes. Golden perch are extremely migratory and migration appears to have been important in maintaining populations over the length of rivers, particularly the upper reaches.

Weirs are proving to be a more significant threat to golden perch than first thought, with a 2006 study showing that about 90% of golden perch larvae passing through undershot weirs are killed. The species is bred in hatcheries, though, in large numbers, and stocked. Concerns over genetic diversity issues are growing.
