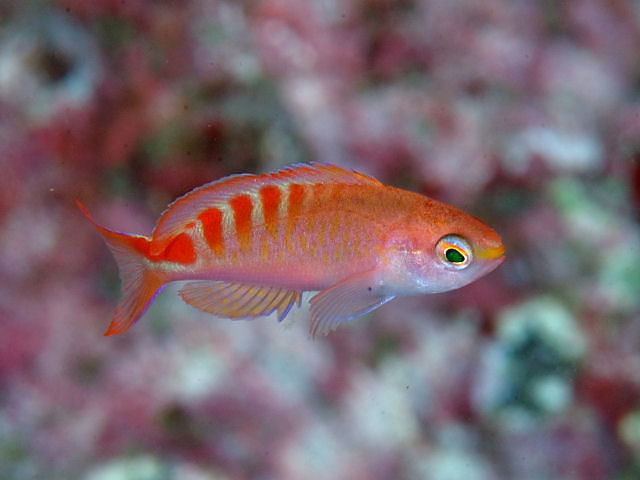
- Pseudanthias lori

Scientific classification
- Kingdom: Animalia
- Phylum: Chordata
- Class: Actinopterygii
- Division: Teleostei
- Order: Perciformes
- Family: Serranidae
- Genus: Pyronotanthias; Gill, 2022

Type species
- Anthias lori Lubbock and Randall, 1976

= Pyronotanthias =

Genus of fishes

Pyronotanthias is a genus of colourful reef fishes of the family Anthiadidae, the groupers and sea basses. They are found in the Indo-Pacific.

== Species ==
These are nine recognized species in this genus:

- Pyronotanthias lori (Lubbock & Randall, 1976)
- Pyronotanthias aurulentus (Randall & McCosker, 1982)
- Pyronotanthias bimarginatus (Randall, 2011)
- Pyronotanthias flavoguttatus (Katayama & Masuda, 1980)
- Pyronotanthias parvirostris (Randall & Lubbock, 1981)
- Pyronotanthias privitera (Randall & Pyle, 2001)
- Pyronotanthias smithvanizi (Randall & Lubbock, 1981)
- Pyronotanthias timanoa (Victor, Teitelbaum & Randall, 2020)
- Pyronotanthias unimarginatus (Randall, 2011)
