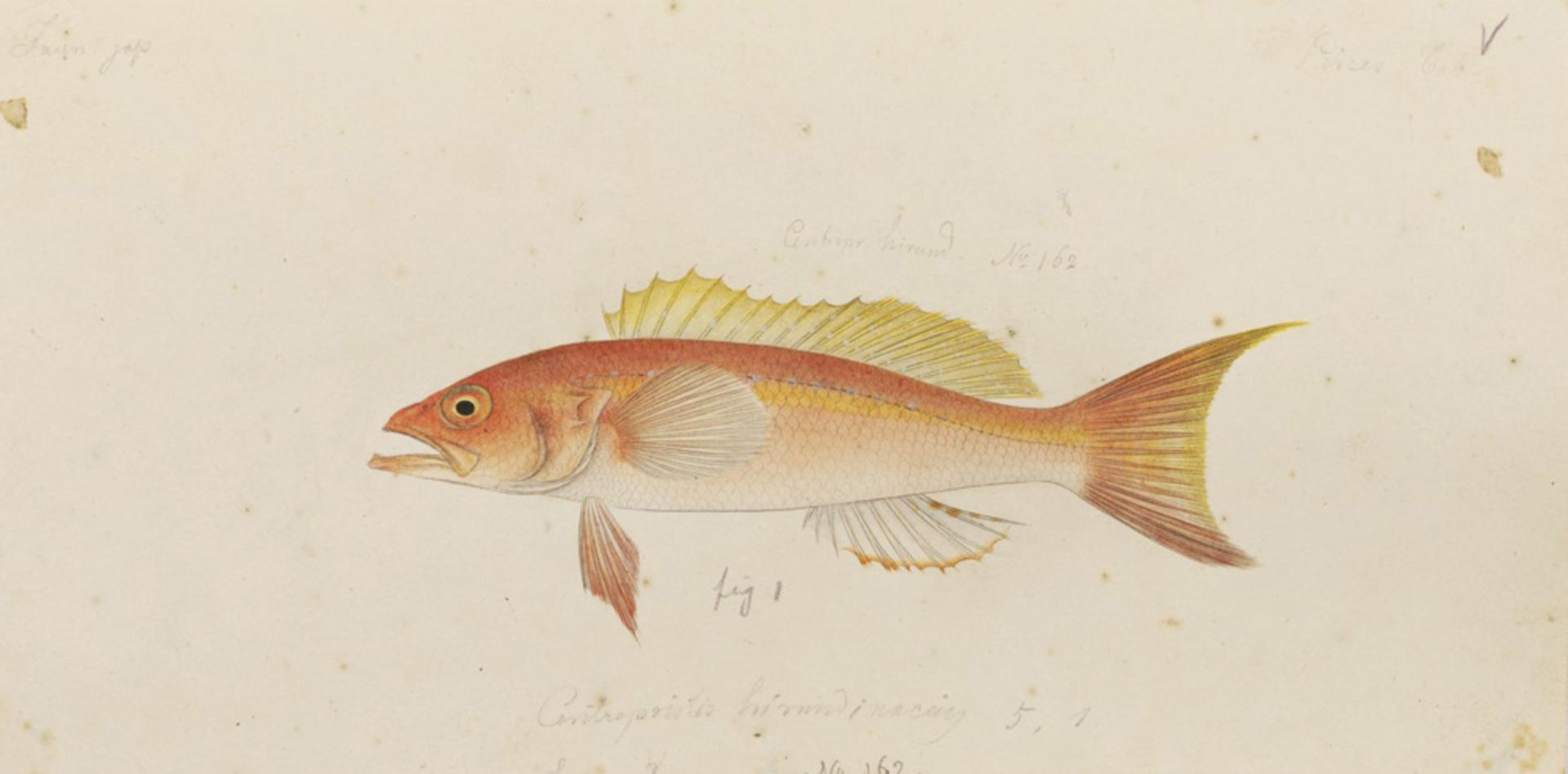
- Chelidoperca hirundinacea

Scientific classification
- Kingdom: Animalia
- Phylum: Chordata
- Class: Actinopterygii
- Order: Perciformes
- Family: Serranidae
- Genus: Chelidoperca; Boulenger, 1895

Type species
- Centropristis hirundinaceus Valenciennes, 1831

= Chelidoperca =

Genus of fishes

Chelidoperca, commonly known as perchlet, is a genus of marine ray-finned fishes which is a member of the subfamily Serraninae of the family Serranidae, which includes the groupers and anthias. They are found in the Indo-Pacific region.

== Species ==
There are 21 recognized species in this genus:

- Chelidoperca africana Cadenat, 1960 (African perchlet)
- Chelidoperca barazeri S.-H. Lee, M.-Y. Lee, Matsunuma and Chen, 2019 (Barazer's perchlet)
- Chelidoperca cerasina Ogino, S.-H. Lee, Chen & Matsunuma, 2019 (Cherry perchlet)
- Chelidoperca flavimacula Psomadakis, Gon & Htut, 2021 (Yellow-spotted perchlet)
- Chelidoperca flavolineata Matsunuma, Tan & Peristiwady, 2020 (Yellow-banded perchlet)
- Chelidoperca formosa Tang & Ho, 2021 (Taiwanese perchlet)
- Chelidoperca hirundinacea (Valenciennes, 1831)
- Chelidoperca investigatoris (Alcock, 1890)
- Chelidoperca lecromi Fourmanoir, 1982
- Chelidoperca leucostigmata S.-H. Lee, M.-Y. Lee, Matsunuma & Chen, 2019 (White-spotted perchlet)
- Chelidoperca maculicauda Bineesh & Akhilesh, 2013 (Indian perchlet)
- Chelidoperca margaritifera M. C. W. Weber, 1913 (Pearly perchlet)
- Chelidoperca microdon S.-H. Lee, M.-Y. Lee, Matsunuma & Chen, 2019 (Small-toothed perchlet)
- Chelidoperca myathantuni Psomadakis, Gon & Htut, 2021 (Mya Than Tun’s perchlet)
- Chelidoperca occipitalis Kotthaus, 1973 (Arabian perchlet)
- Chelidoperca pleurospilus (Günther, 1880)
- Chelidoperca pollux Matsunuma & Hoang, 2024
- Chelidoperca pulchella Matsunuma, Tachihara, Hirasaka & Motomura, 2024
- Chelidoperca santosi J. T. Williams & K. E. Carpenter, 2015 (Pogi perchlet)
- Chelidoperca stella Matsunuma & Motomura, 2016
- Chelidoperca tosaensis Matsunuma, Yamakawa & J.T. Williams, 2017 (Red-spot perchlet)
