= Million Paws Walk =

Annual dog walking event in Australia

A family of Million Paws Walk participants in Canberra, 2006: parents, baby, and two dogs. The nearer dog is wearing a Million Paws Walk dog coat.

The Million Paws Walk is a national activity day by the Australian Royal Society for the Prevention of Cruelty to Animals held in May.

Dog owners take their animals walking on designated routes in various cities and towns, with the aim to get around 250,000 animals nationally (hence "a million paws".)

Owners pay a small contribution that goes to the running of local RSPCA animal shelters.

The RSPCA arranges for water troughs and 'poo' disposal bins at various places around the course.

== History ==
The walk was inaugurated in Queensland in 1994 after Dr Cam Day, the RSPCA Queensland Operations Manager and Veterinarian, considered ways to raise $1 million and community awareness for disadvantaged animals.

The inaugural Million Paws Walk was held in Brisbane's New Farm Park in October 1994 as the main focus of Pet Week celebrations. The idea was taken to a national audience in 1996. By 2004 there were 60 walks with around 30,000 people and 25,000 animals participating in every Australian state and territory.

The RSPCA has announced that, due to rising costs of hosting the event, the 2025 walk will be the last Million Paws Walk.

== Venues ==
- Canberra, Australian Capital Territory – Lake Burley Griffin.
- Sydney – Centennial Park, Sydney.
- Melbourne – Albert Park
- Brisbane, Queensland – University of Queensland
- Gladstone, Queensland – Canoe Point Beach
- Perth, Western Australia – Sir James Mitchell Park.
- Adelaide, South Australia – Bonython Park.
- Hobart, Tasmania – Queens Domain
