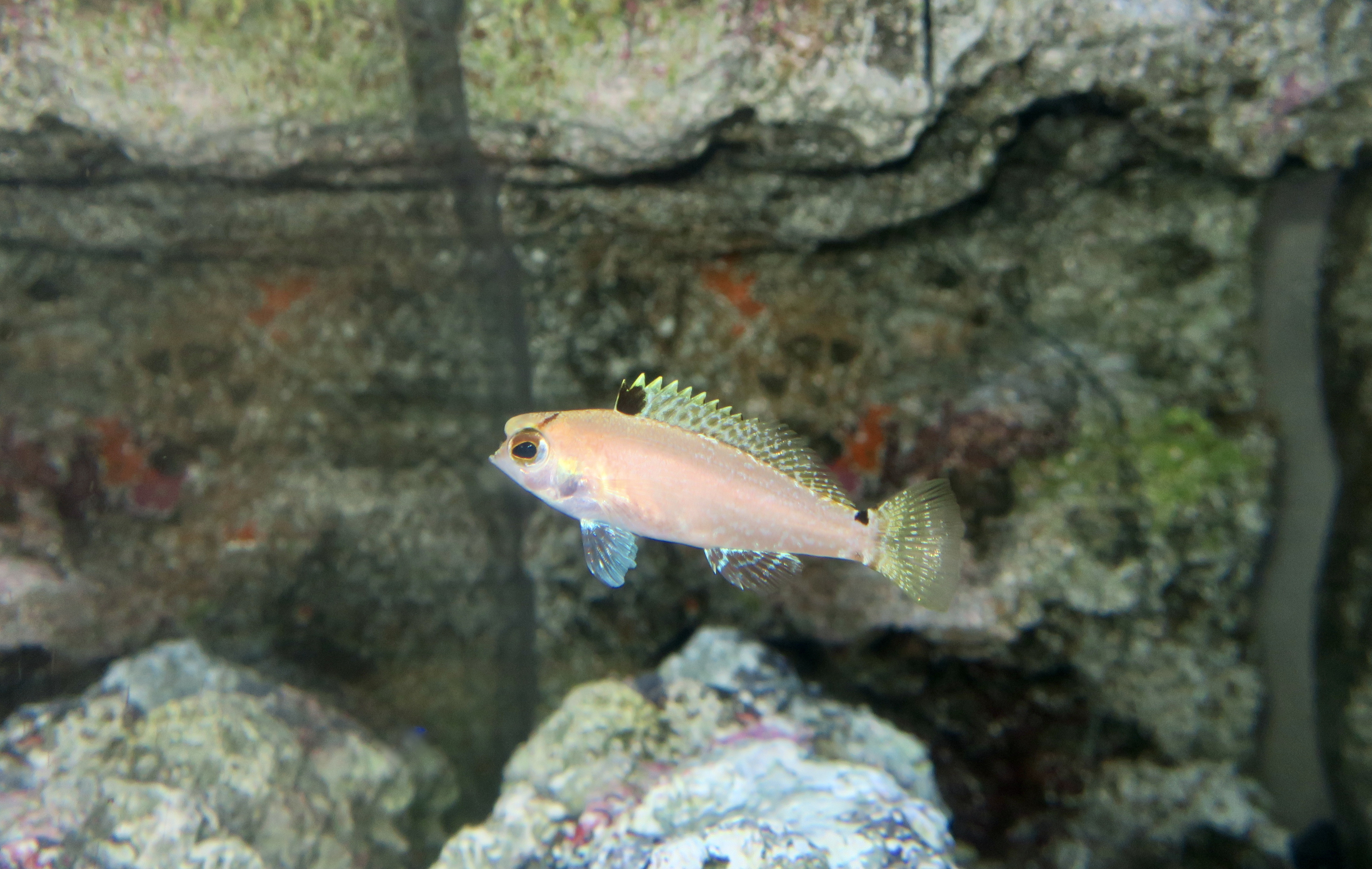

Conservation status
- Least Concern (IUCN 3.1)

Scientific classification
- Kingdom: Animalia
- Phylum: Chordata
- Class: Actinopterygii
- Order: Perciformes
- Suborder: Percoidei
- Family: Serranidae
- Genus: Bullisichthys; Rivas, 1971
- Species: B. caribbaeus

Binomial name
- Bullisichthys caribbaeus Rivas, 1971

= Pugnose bass =

Species of fish

The pugnose bass (Bullisichthys caribbaeus) is a species of marine ray finned fish which is a member of the subfamily Serraninae of the family Serranidae. It is the only species in the monotypic genus Bullisichthys. It is found in the western Atlantic Ocean from the Bahamas south into the Caribbean Sea where it is found from Isla de la Juventud in Cuba, and from Hispaniola through the Antilles to Trinidad, it also occurs along the eastern coast of Central America from Belize to Nicaragua, including the Serrana Bank, and along the South American Caribbean coast from Curaçao to the Essequibo River in Guyana. It is found in deep water at depths between 90 and 150 metres (300 and 490 ft) where it may be abundant in areas of steep or vertical rock slopes. This species attains a maximum published total length of 6 centimetres (2.4 in).
