= Photo blanket =

Piece of fabric displaying an image

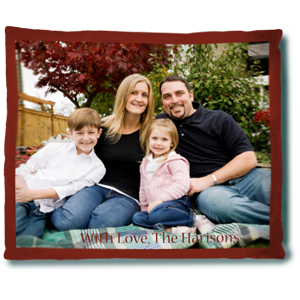
A modern photo blanket

A photo blanket is a large, rectangular piece of fabric displaying images, pictures, or designs, often with bound edges, used as a blanket or decorative object. Historically photo blankets were made of thick cloth depicting people, objects, and symbols intended to tell a story or reveal historical events.

== History ==
The photo blanket has a history nearly as long as the history of clothing itself. For thousands of years, people around the world used blankets as a form of communication through storytelling, honoring dead, and a well-respected form of art.

Ancient Egyptians weaved colored threads and sometimes even gold into a fabric (usually linen) or by painting with inks and dyes on papyrus cloth. The cloth (blanket) would often form pictures to tell stories and to honor prominent people or one of the multiple gods of their culture.

Navajo tribes used special indigo dye from Mexico and other vegetal dyes to color multi-ply yarns and weave them into three main types of blankets - a serape (a shoulder covering blanket that is longer than it is wide), a saddle blanket (a blanket that was folded in half under a horse’s saddle for extra cushioning), and a chief's blanket (a shoulder blanket that was made wider than it was long).

Nepalese rug makers would use luxurious silks, wools, and hemp to create beautiful works or art. Using vertical looms and fibers dyed with natural vegetal dyes, they form several different types of knots together for a soft and evenly tufted finish.

For hundreds of years, tribes throughout Indonesia and Africa have used a dye and resist technique called batik to create intricate patterns and pictures. During the past two or three centuries batik has become one of the principal means of expression of the spiritual and cultural values of Southeast Asia. Once again used as a form of storytelling and passing down history, picture fabrics and blankets have been an integral part of their culture.

Asian cultures have used weaving and blankets for the same purposes, using gold and other precious metals woven into their cloths and blankets. As an important artistic form, it conveys the history and myths of a culture through iconography and pictures.

Throughout history, photo blankets have been an ever present and fundamental key to communication, decoration, and tradition. Today’s photo blankets have changed to modern techniques and more efficient manufacturing, but the primary meaning has remained very similar. People display meaningful photos that represent memories and reveal history. Adding text or symbols communicate language and add to the blanket’s storytelling aspect.

== Uses ==
Photo blankets are used throughout the home for displaying pictures and images as objects of decor, for warmth, or to be given and received as gifts.

Uses in home decor include furniture coverings and as decorative displays of a design or photograph. Photo blankets can be used to cuddle up for warmth either in or outdoors. They are often given as wedding, birthday, Christmas, baby, or anniversary gifts to individuals or couples displaying memorable pictures, dates and quotes on them.

== Types ==
There are three main types of photo blankets - woven photo blankets, knitted photo blankets, and dyed photo blankets.

A woven photo blanket is made on a jacquard loom using digital software that scans a picture, creates a pattern and then creates a woven picture blanket using various colored yarns that interlace at 90 degree angles (see weave). Woven photo blankets, comes in two varieties; an afghan photo blanket and a tapestry photo blanket. The yarn used in the weave of an afghan photo blanket is the same thickness in both horizontal and vertical directions while a tapestry photo blanket is manufactured with yarn of two different diameters. In a tapestry photo blanket the thinner of the two yarns; i.e., the warp, actually consists of 6-8 different color strands of yarn which are combined in various ways, based on a photo, to re-create the colors as accurately as possible (even black and white).

A knitted photo blanket is made by a machine that uses a similar scanning and pattern process, but instead of weaving the yarns together, knits them together in a looping technique (see knit). Often knitted photo blankets consist of limited colors due to the knitting process and the continuous thread forming loops in the process.

A dyed photo blanket is the newest type of photo blanket and is made by printing dye onto fabric from a digital image (see dye sublimation). This type allows for unlimited colors and has the sharpest picture clarity of the three.

Each process creates a permanent picture, with varying degrees of softness, color and clarity.

== See also ==
- Knit
- Weave
- Dye-sublimation printer
- Bedding
- History of clothing and textiles
- Textile arts
