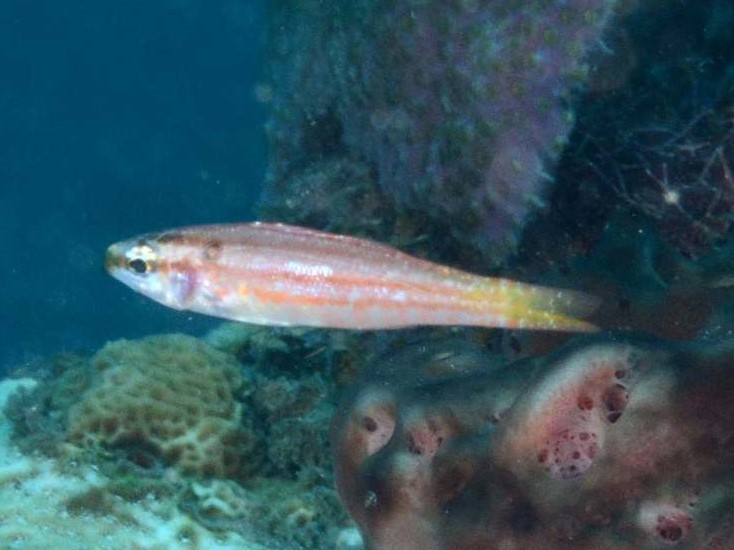

Conservation status
- Least Concern (IUCN 3.1)

Scientific classification
- Kingdom: Animalia
- Phylum: Chordata
- Class: Actinopterygii
- Order: Perciformes
- Family: Serranidae
- Genus: Schultzea; Woods, 1958
- Species: S. beta

Binomial name
- Schultzea beta (Hildebrand, 1940)

Synonyms
- Serranus beta Hildebrand, 1940; Schultzea campechanus Woods, 1958

= School bass =

Species of fish

The school bass (Schultzea beta) is a species of marine ray-finned fish, it is the only member of the monotypic genus Schultzea which is part of the subfamily Serraninae which itself is classified within the family Serranidae, along with the anthias and groupers. It is found in the western central Atlantic Ocean. This species is found in deeper waters near coral reefs where it forms small groups which feed on plankton. The school bass is a synchronous hermaphrodite. The generic name honours the American ichthyologist Leonard Peter Schultz (1901–1986) who was Curator of Fishes at the United States National Museum who examined the specimens described by Loren P. Woods (1914–1979) as Schultzea campachanus, which was later shown to be a synonym of Hildebrand's Serranus beta.
