= Parasphyraenops =

Scientific classification
- Kingdom: Animalia
- Phylum: Chordata
- Class: Actinopterygii
- Order: Perciformes
- Family: Serranidae
- Genus: Parasphyraenops; Bean, 1912

Type species
- Parasphyraenops atrimanus Bean, 1912

Genus of fishes

Parasphyraenops is a small genus of marine ray-finned fishes from the subfamily Serraninae, which is one of three subfamilies in the family Serranidae, which also includes the anthias and groupers. These fishes are found in the central western Atlantic Ocean.

== Species ==
There are two species classified in the genus Parasphyraenops:

- Parasphyraenops atrimanus Bean, 1912 – bank bass, black handed bass
- Parasphyraenops incisus (Colin, 1978) – fork-tailed bass, bantam bass
