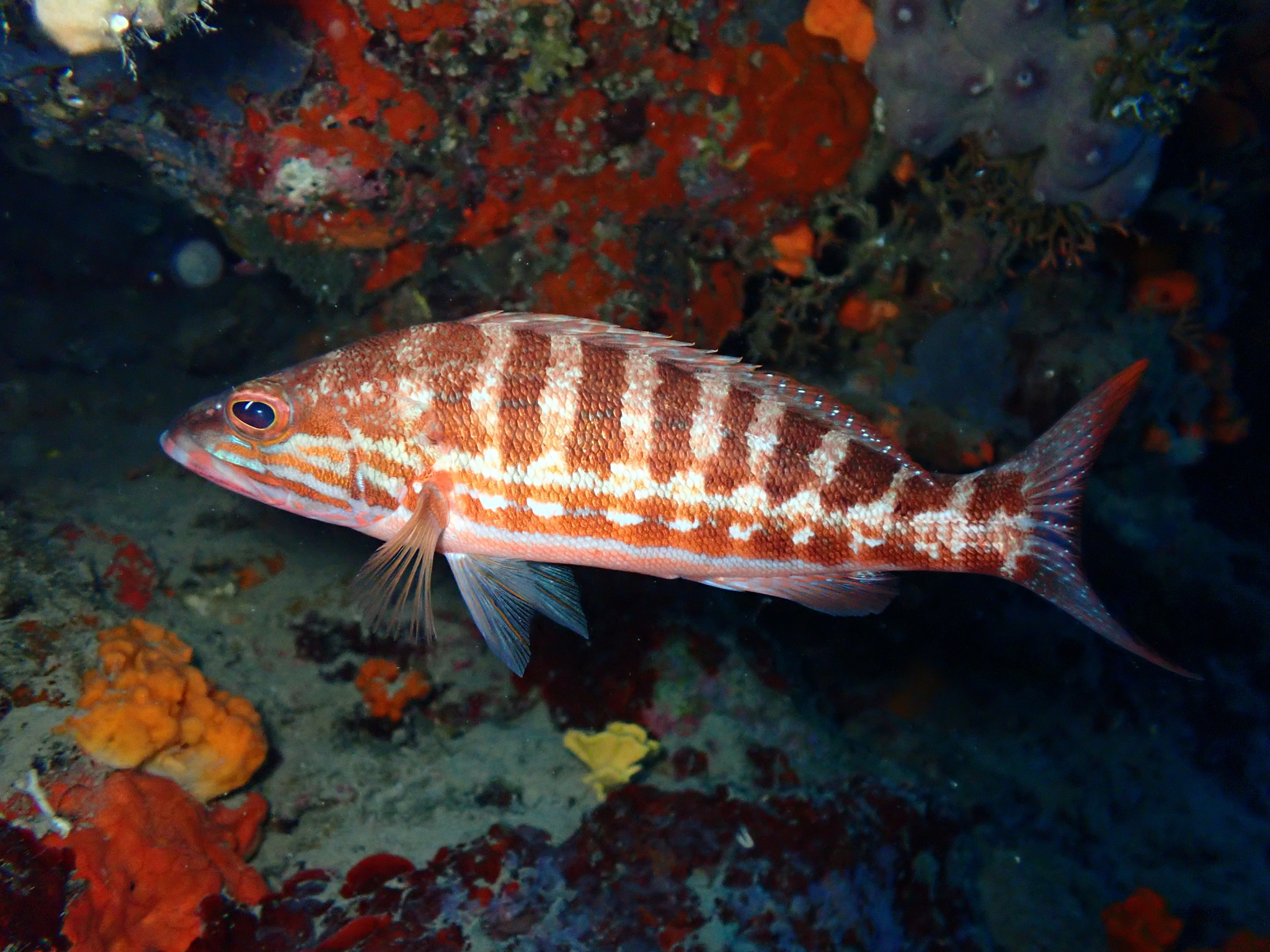
- Serranus cabrilla, the comber

Scientific classification
- Kingdom: Animalia
- Phylum: Chordata
- Class: Actinopterygii
- Order: Perciformes
- Suborder: Percoidei
- Family: Serranidae; Swainson, 1839

Synonyms
- Serraninae Swainson, 1839

= Serranidae =

Family of fishes

Serranidae is a family of marine fish belonging to the order Perciformes. The family used to contain about 450 species in 65 genera, including some of the sea basses and groupers, but taxonomic revisions split out Epinephelinae (groupers), Grammistini (soapfish), and Anthiadinae (anthias); as a consequence, this family is now much less speciose. Representatives of this group live in tropical and subtropical seas worldwide.

== Characteristics ==
Serranids are generally robust in form, with large mouths and small spines on the gill coverings. They typically have several rows of sharp teeth, usually with a pair of particularly large, canine-like fangs projecting from the lower jaw. Many serranid species are brightly colored.

They generally have ten spines in their dorsal fins and seven soft rays in their anal fins. They are also characterised by the fin spines being unserrated. The genera within the Serranidae are separated by the meristics of the soft rays in the dorsal fin.

All serranids are carnivorous, feeding on other fish and crustaceans. They are typically ambush predators, hiding in cover on the reef and darting out to grab passing prey. Their bright colours are most likely a form of disruptive camouflage, similar to the stripes of a tiger.

Many species are protogynous hermaphrodites, meaning they start out as females and change sex to male later in life. They produce large quantities of eggs and their larvae are planktonic, generally at the mercy of ocean currents until they are ready to settle into adult populations.

== Classification ==
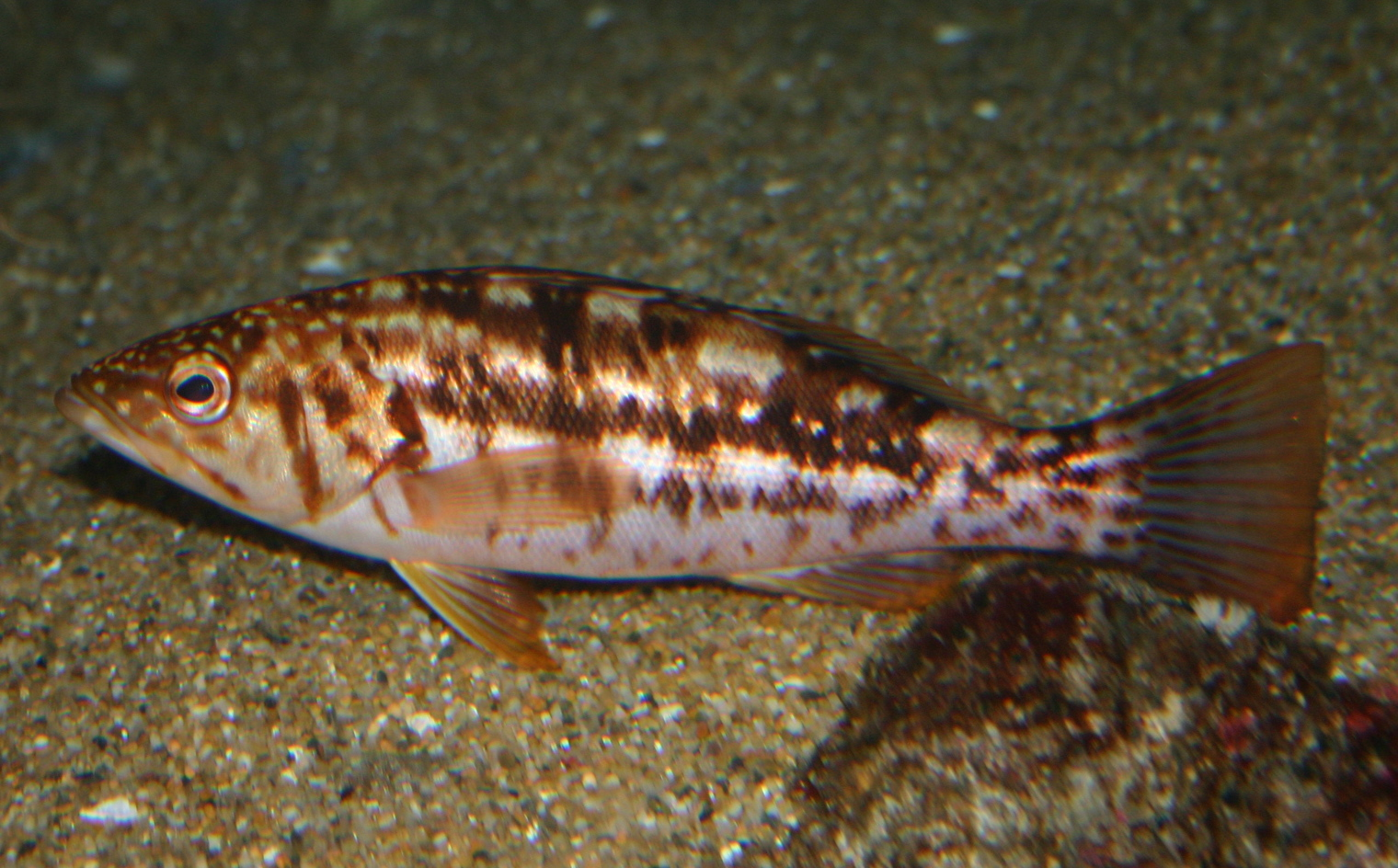
Kelp bass (Paralabrax clathratus)

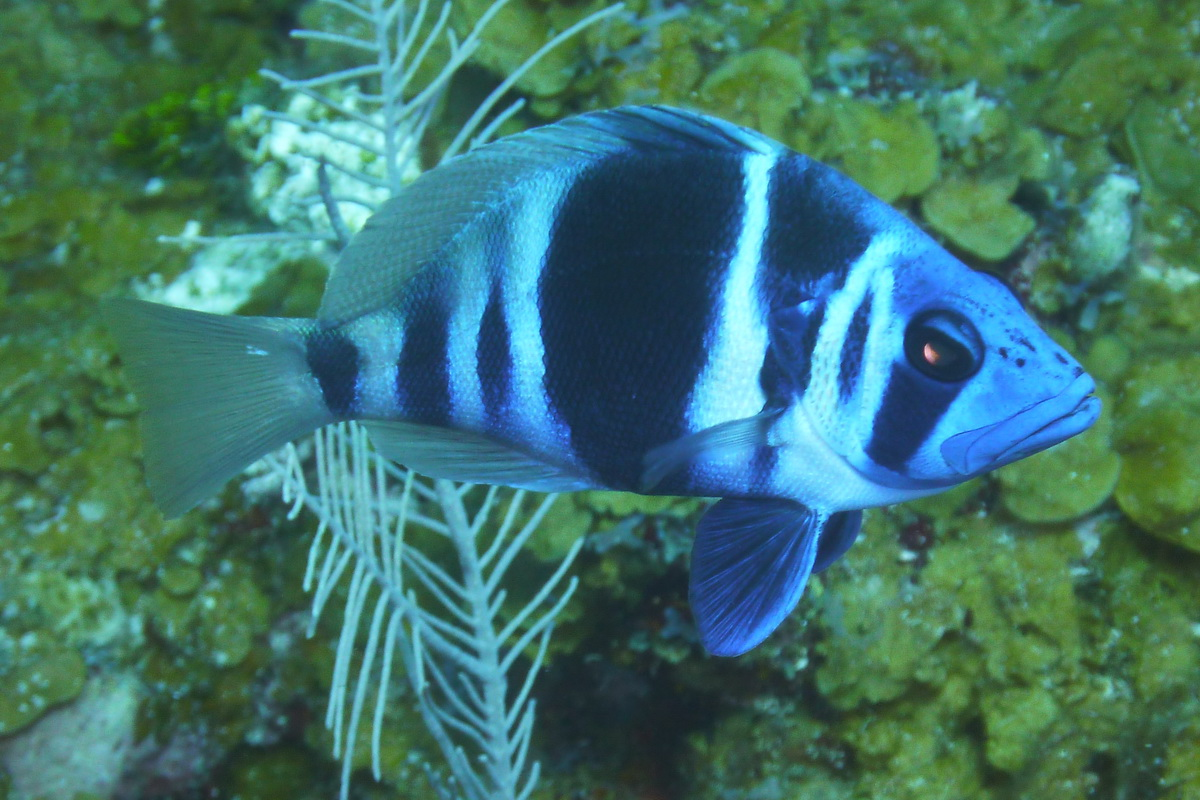
Indigo hamlet (Hypoplectrus indigo)

In past taxonomic treatments, this family had long encompassed three subfamilies: Anthiadinae, Epinephelinae, and Serraninae. A 2007 study of mitochondrial and nuclear DNA by W. L. Smith and M. T. Craig recovered a different arrangement, where Serranines and Anthiadines nested with part of Scorpaeniformes such as Ablabys and Hoplichthys, while Epinephelines were outside the larger group (clade) containing Serranines and Anthiadines.

More recent studies have retained these three clades within the Percoidei instead of with scorpaenoids. Although later studies continued using the three subfamily system, more recent studies have split them into their own families based on phylogenetic evidence. The elevation of Epinephelidae, Grammistidae, and Anthiadidae into their own distinct families was eventually accepted by multiple taxonomic authorities, such as the World Register of Marine Species (WoRMS), Eschmeyer's Catalog of Fishes (ECoF), and the International Union for Conservation of Nature. This family is sister to the other two former subfamilies within the Serranidae, with the genus Centropristis being sister to all other serranids as presently defined.

=== Genera ===
The following selected genera are considered part of Serranidae in Eschmeyer's Catalog of Fishes, except where noted:

- Bullisichthys Rivas, 1971
- Centropristis Cuvier, 1829
- Chelidoperca Boulenger, 1895
- Cratinus Steindachner, 1878
- Diplectrum Holbrook, 1855
- Dules Cuvier, 1829
- Hypoplectrus Gill, 1861
- Paralabrax Girard, 1856
- Parasphyraenops T.H. Bean, 1912
- Pyronotanthias Gill, 2022
- Schultzea Woods, 1958
- Serraniculus Ginsburg, 1952
- Serranus Cuvier, 1816

The fossil genus Paleoserranus was formerly placed in the former, more expansive version of this family. More recent studies have, however, suggested it to be a basal perciform.
