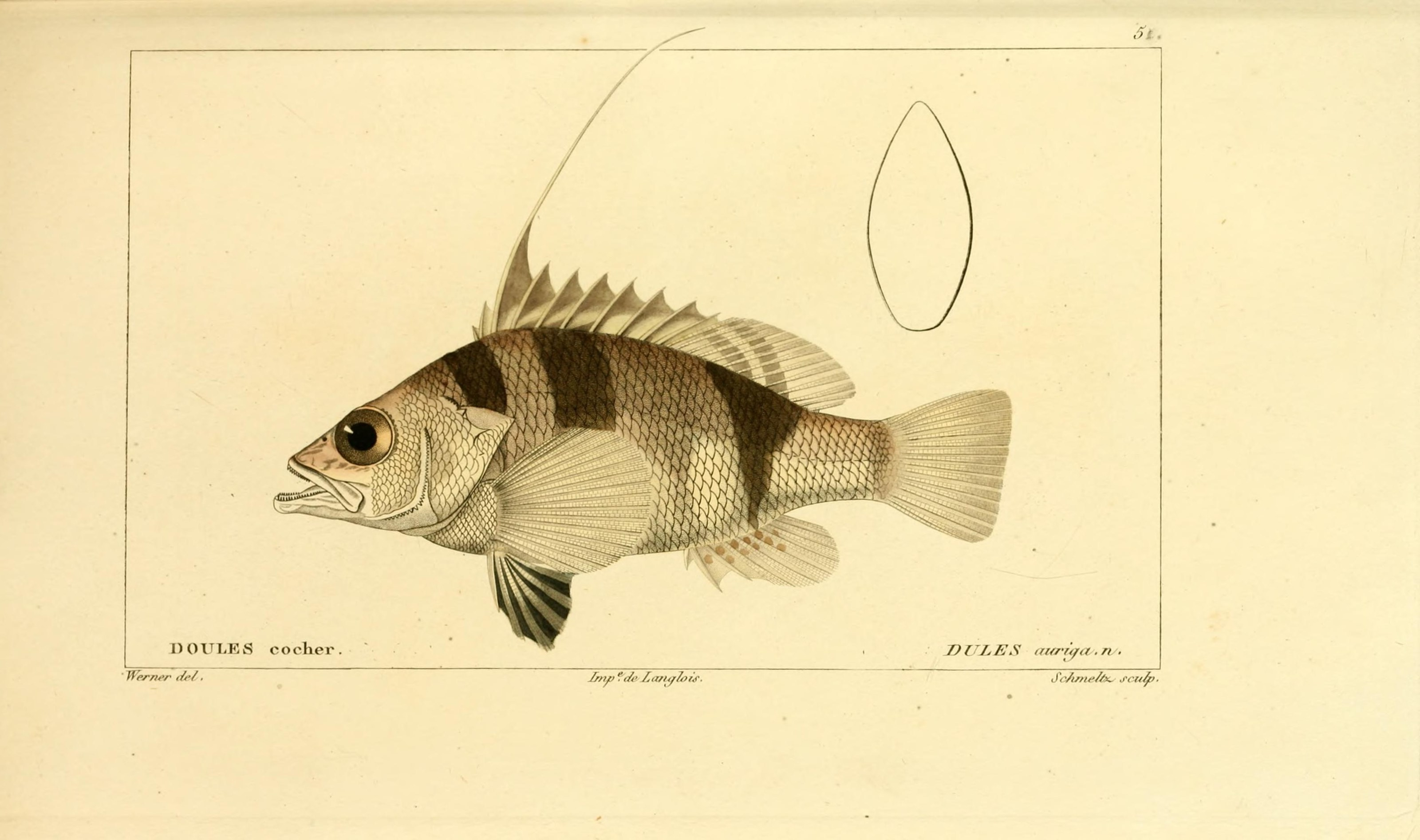

Scientific classification
- Kingdom: Animalia
- Phylum: Chordata
- Class: Actinopterygii
- Order: Perciformes
- Family: Serranidae
- Genus: Dules; Cuvier, 1829
- Species: D. auriga

Binomial name
- Dules auriga Cuvier, 1829

= Dules =

Genus of fishes

Dules is a genus of marine ray-finned fishes in the family Serranidae. It is a monotypic genus containing a single species Dules auriga, which is found in the south western Atlantic Ocean off the coasts of southern Brazil, Uruguay and northern Argentina. It is a hermaphrodite which is found in deeper offshore waters and is frequently taken as a bycatch by deep water fisheries.

The fossil species "Dules" temnopterus Agassiz, 1836 from the Early Eocene of Monte Bolca, Italy, was formerly placed in this genus. However, more recent analyses indicate that it does not belong to Dules and cannot be confidently placed in the Serranidae, and is thus now considered an indeterminate percomorph in its own genus, †Jimtylerius.
