= Blanket =

Type of bedding

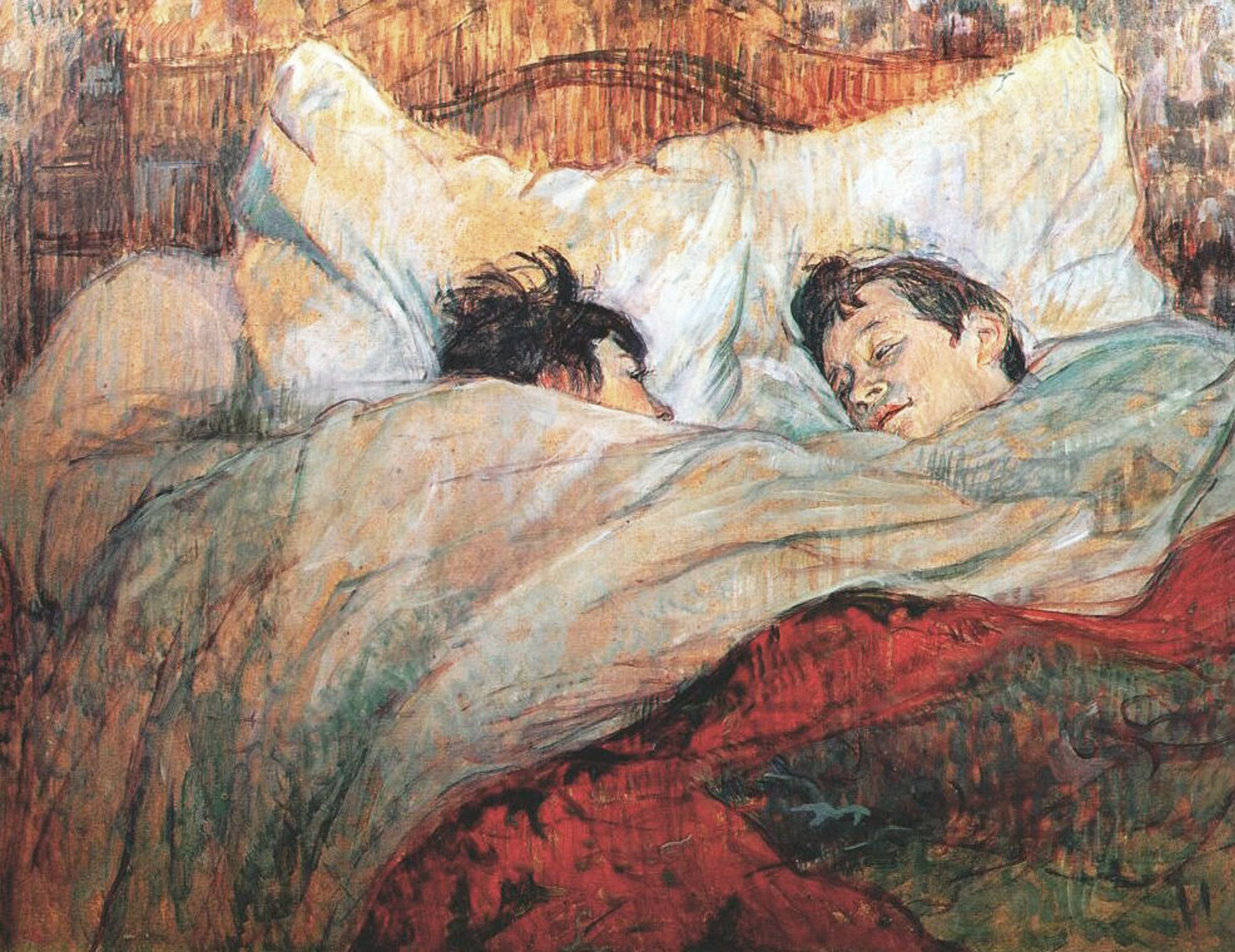
The Bed, 1892 by Henri de Toulouse-Lautrec, depicts two people under a blanket

A blanket is a swath of smooth cloth large enough either to cover or to enfold most of the user's body and thick enough to keep the body warm by trapping radiant body heat that otherwise would be lost through conventional convection and radiation.

== Etymology ==
The term arose from the generalization of a specific fabric called blanke, a heavily napped undyed woolen weave. A popular theory has that the name derives from an eponymous Thomas Blanket (Blanquette), a Flemish weaver who lived in Bristol, England, in the 14th century. However, earlier usage of the term is possible as a borrowing of the Old French word blanket for the type of fabric, attested as early as 1278 and deriving from the adjective blanc, meaning "white". William Shakespeare is recognised as the first person to use the verb blanket, meaning to 'cover with or as with a blanket'. In the play King Lear, published in 1608, the character Edgar says: "My face ile grime with filth, Blanket my loynes, else all my haire with knots."

== History ==
An ancient form of blanket is recorded as "Kambala". The 7th century Chinese traveler and scholar Xuanzang mentioned the stuff in his travelogue of his journey to India in 629–645 CE. He refers to "Kambala" as a woolen material made from sheep or goat's hair. He categorized it as a kind of material for clothing. The Sanskrit meaning of Kambala is 'a woolen blanket." According to India's ancient text, the Atharvaveda, kambala is a generic term for materials such as shawls and blankets. Known as "Kambali" in Kannada and Tamil, these thick coarse blankets are woven with sheep wool whose texture is extremely coarse and thick to provide adequate warmth in winter.

Pandu-Kambala was a type of Kambala from Gandhāra, Ancient Indian scholar Pāṇini mentioned "pandu-kambala" from the upper parts of Gandhara, the place was "Uddiyana," which was famous for the said blankets. Some more variations of old Indian blankets are "keca-lakah", "kalamitika", "talicchakam", "varavanah", "sarumitika", "paristomah", "samanatabhad", "turangastaranam", "varnakam", "paristomah", "samanatabhad". Coarse qualities were used by farmers, and herdsmen. Some of them were used to spread out on the backs of animals like horses, elephants, and bullocks.

== Types ==
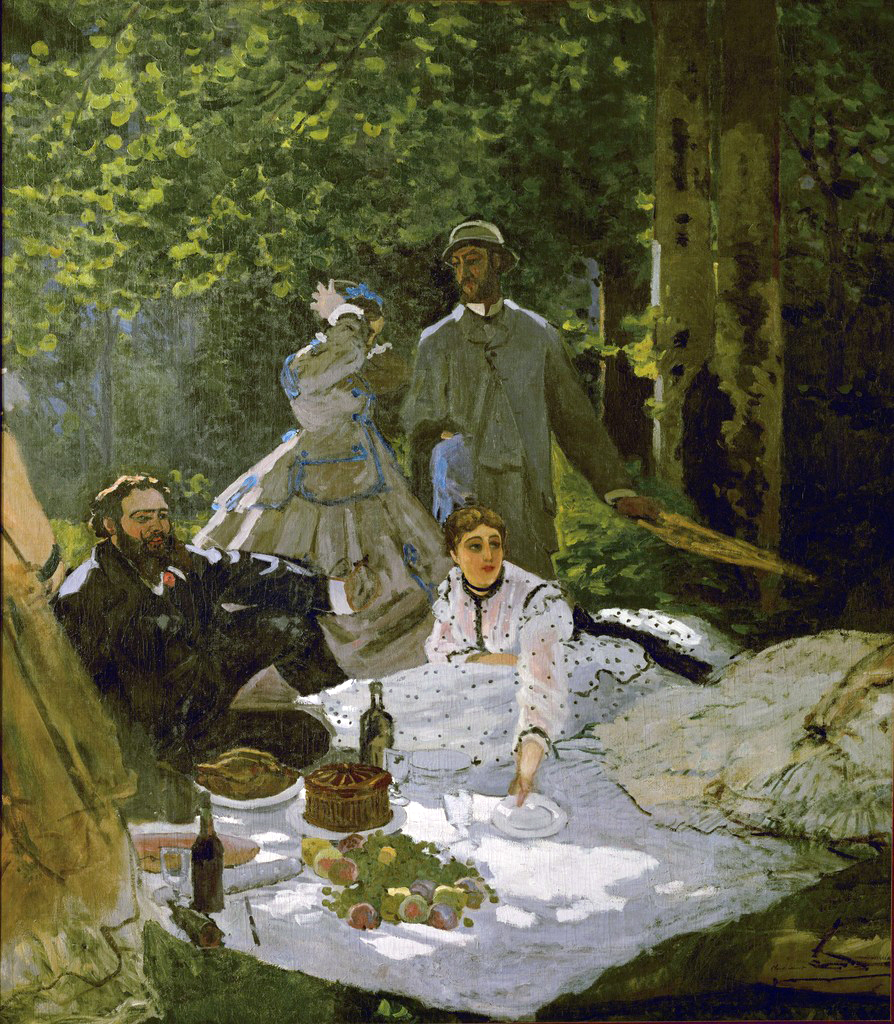
Le déjeuner sur l'herbe, (right section) by Claude Monet

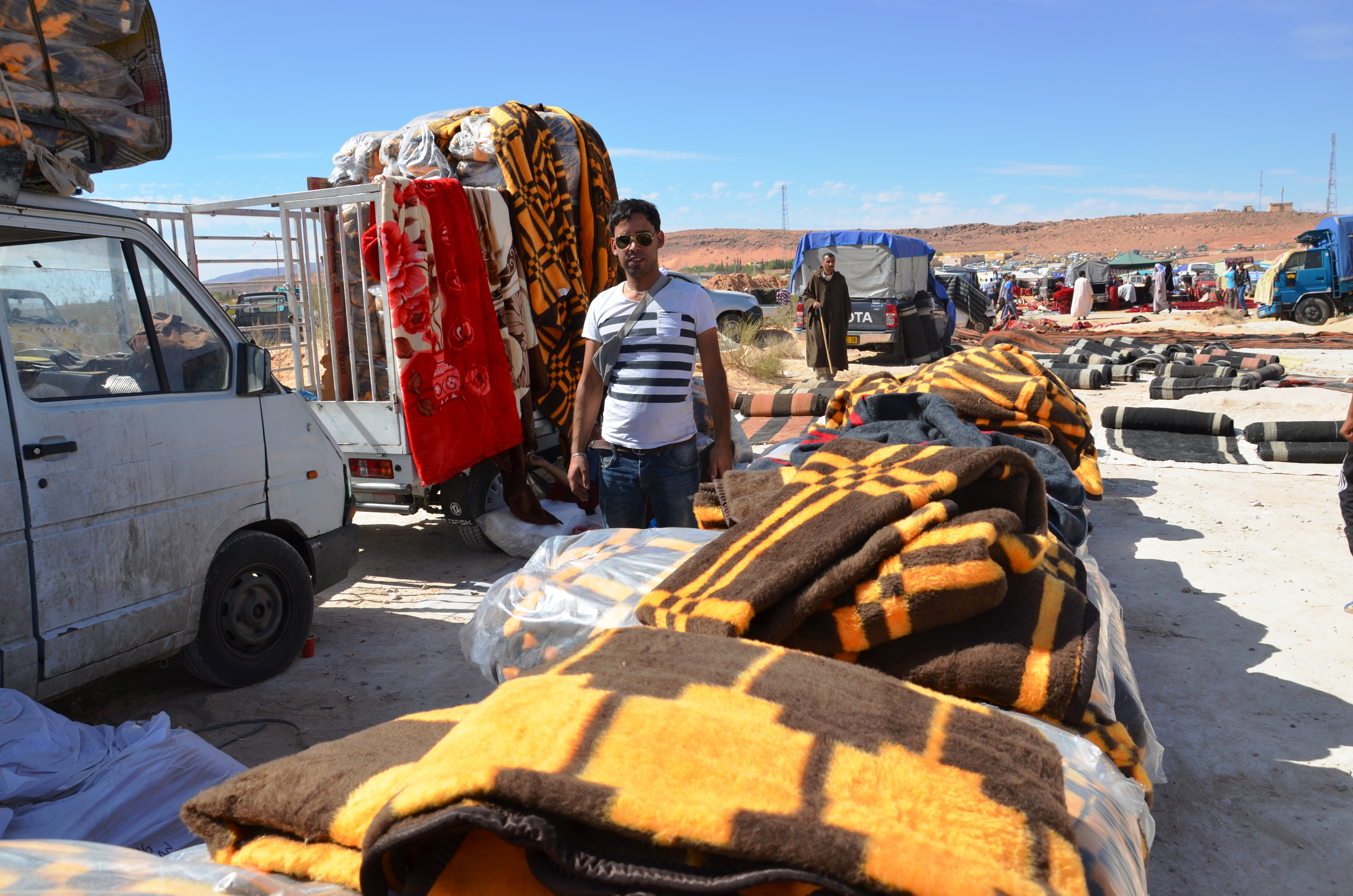
Blanket vendors in a market in Algeria

Many types of blanket material, such as wool, are used because they are thicker and have more substantial fabric to them, but cotton can also be used for light blankets. Wool blankets are warmer and also relatively slow to burn compared to cotton. The most common types of blankets are woven acrylic, knitted polyester, mink, cotton, fleece and wool. Blankets also come with exotic crafting and exotic material such as crocheted afghan or a silk covering. The term blanket is often interchanged with comforter, quilt, and duvet, as they all have similar uses.

== Uses ==
Blankets have been used by militaries for many centuries. Militaries are some of the biggest single consumers of woolen blankets. Military blankets tend to be coarse grey, with thick fibres of over 20 microns.

Special blankets known as baby blankets are used to protect infants from the cold. Small children (and some adults) may also use a blanket as a comfort object.

Blankets may be spread on the ground for a picnic or where people want to sit in a grassy or muddy area without soiling their clothing. Temporary blankets have been designed for this purpose.

== See also ==
- Bedspread
- Belted plaid
- Blanket fort
- Curtain
- Electric blanket
- Fire blanket
- Horse blanket
- Hudson's Bay point blanket
- Photo blanket
- Comfort object
- Sleeved blanket
- Sleeping bag
- Space blanket
- Melton (cloth)
