= Horse blanket =

Horse equipment designed to protect a horse from the elements and cold

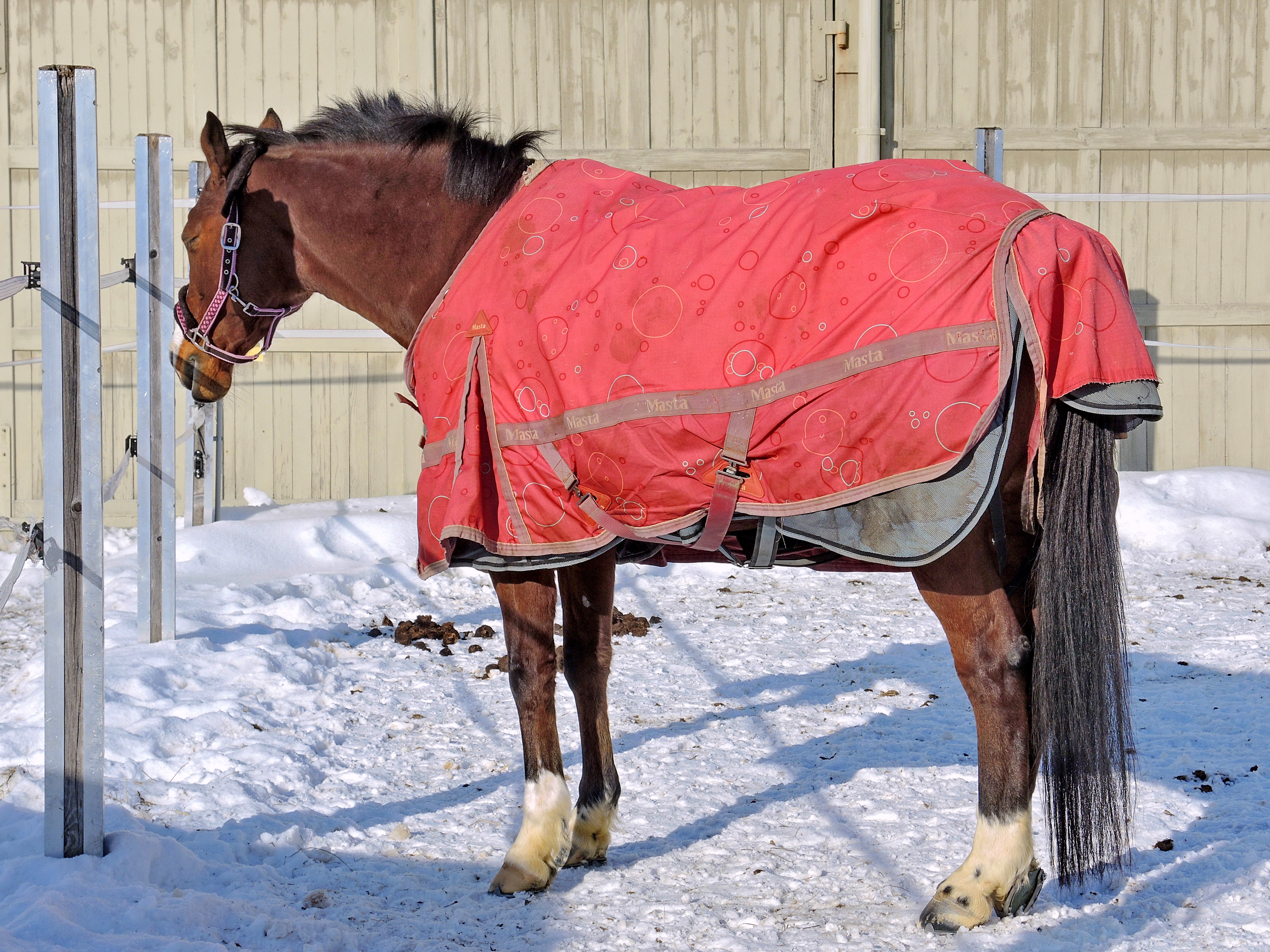
A winter turnout blanket with tail cover, suitable for severe weather

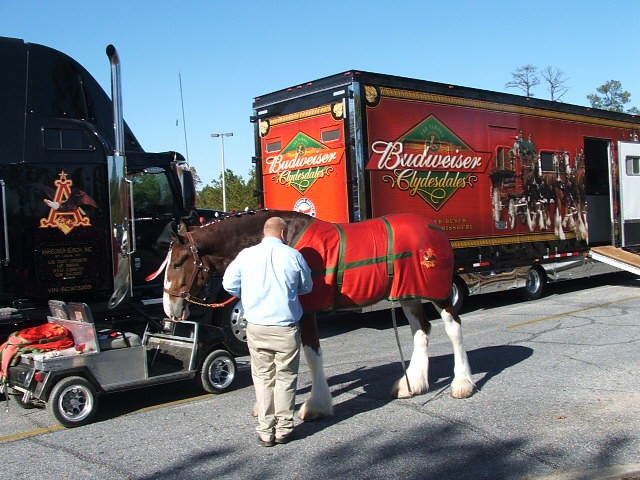
Blankets are often used when shipping horses to prevent chills and even out temperature changes. Here, one of the Budweiser Clydesdales is wearing a horse blanket.

A horse blanket or rug is a blanket or animal coat intended for keeping a horse or other equine warm or otherwise protected from wind or other elements. They are tailored to fit around a horse's body from chest to rump, with straps crossing underneath the belly to secure the blanket yet allowing the horse to move about freely. Most have one or two straps that buckle in front, but a few designs have a closed front and must be slipped over a horse's head. Some designs also have small straps that loop lightly around the horse's hind legs to prevent the blanket from slipping sideways.

== Uses ==
Standard horse blankets, aka rugs, covers or coats, are commonly kept on a horse when it is loose in a stall or pasture as well as when traveling. Different weights are made for different weather conditions, and some are water-resistant or waterproof. Modern materials similar to those used in human outdoor wear are commonly used in blanket manufacture.

Blankets are sometimes used to keep the horse's hair short. If horses are blanketed at the beginning of the autumn, especially if kept in a lighted area for 16 hours a day, they will not grow a winter coat. Blankets also protect horses that are kept with a short clipped hair coat for show purposes. When a horse is given a full body clip or even a partial clip of any kind, it needs to have a blanket kept on at all times if the weather is cool because the horse no longer has the natural insulation of a longer hair coat. If a blanket is put on a horse at the beginning of the winter in order to suppress the growth of a winter coat, or if the horse is kept clipped in cold weather, the blanket cannot be taken off until warmer weather arrives in the spring. If a horse is subjected to cold weather without either a blanket or a natural hair coat to keep it warm, it may become ill, and vulnerable to sicknesses such as influenza.

== Types of blankets ==
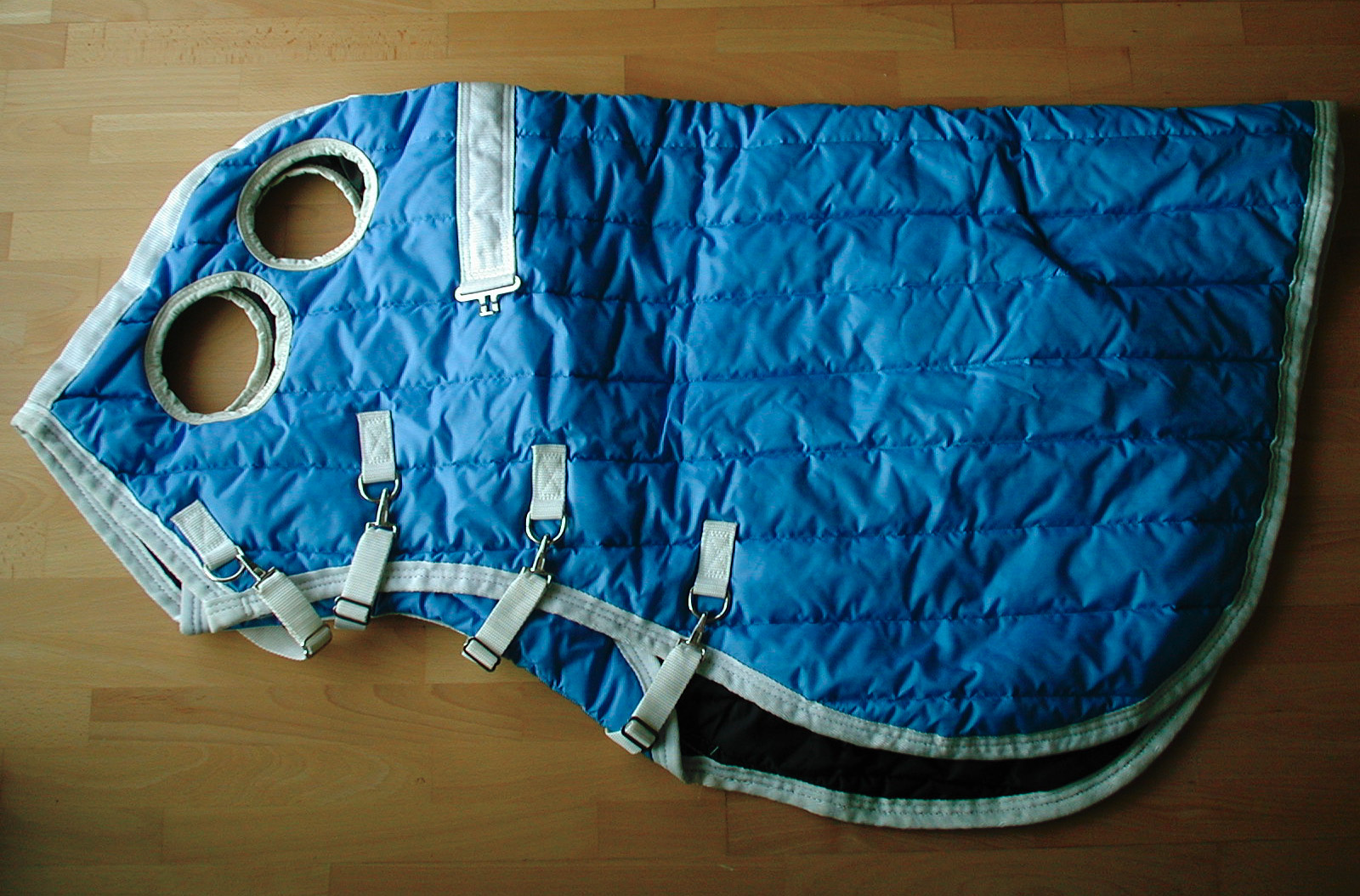
A hood, showing openings for eyes and ears

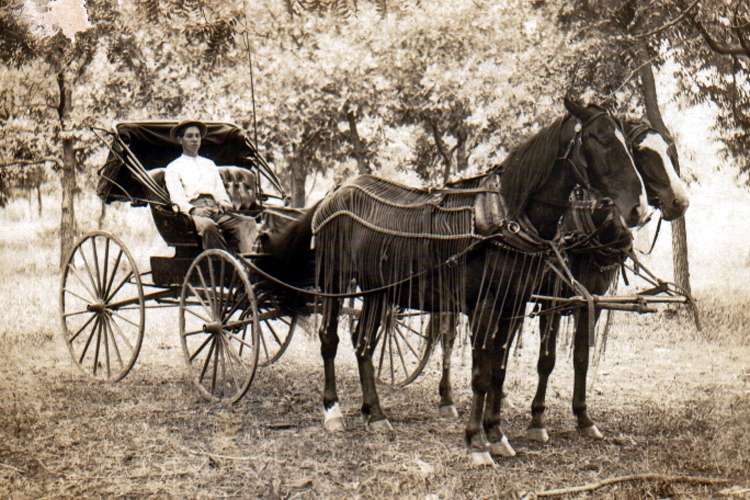
Horses wearing knotted cord fly sheets, 1910

Heavy blankets for warmth make up the bulk of the horse blanket market, but lightweight blankets may be used in the summer to help the animal ward off flies and to prevent the hair coat from bleaching out. Such blankets are usually called a "sheet" or a "fly sheet". They are usually made of some type of nylon or strong synthetic fiber, but with the capacity to "breathe" so that the animal remains cool. Most have a smooth nylon lining in front to prevent hair from wearing off on the shoulders. They are becoming increasingly popular, particularly with the rise of insect borne diseases such as West Nile fever. Rain sheets are blankets with no fill, and are waterproof. This means they provide very little warmth, but are waterproof and wind proof. They are often used in summer rain showers where it is too warm for the horse to be stabled or wear its winter rug, but must still keep dry.

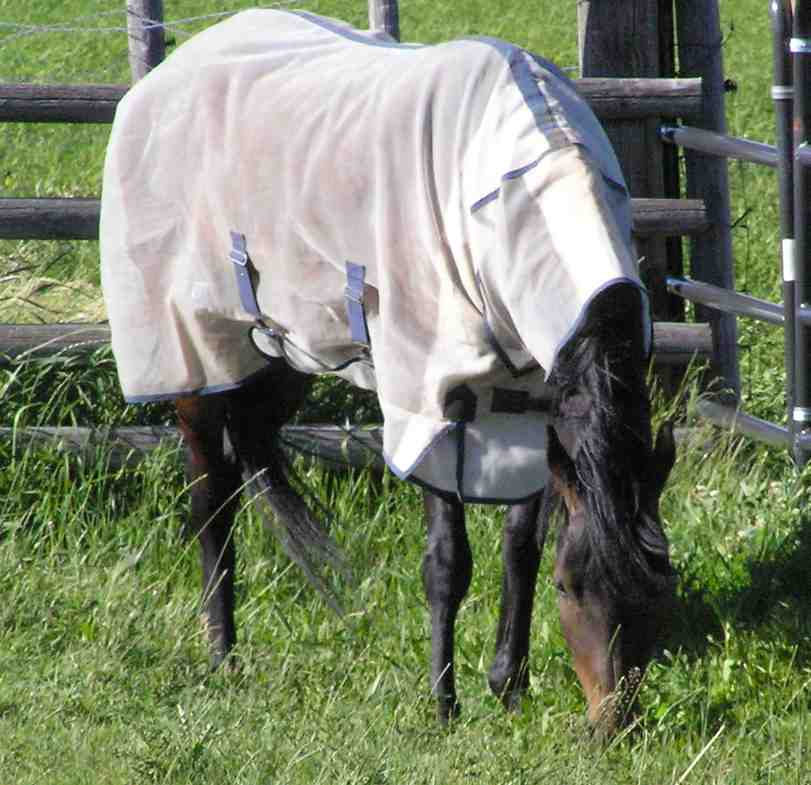
A horse wearing a summer fly sheet with attached neck cover, light blankets ward off insects and prevent coat bleaching

Most blankets may be supplemented with a neck cover or a full hood. Neck covers are often attached directly to the blanket. Hoods are a separate piece of horse "clothing", which cover the neck and come down the head to just above the muzzle of the horse, with holes cut for the eyes and ears. Summer weight hoods and neck covers help keep away insects and are also frequently used to keep a horse clean before a horse show. Winter weight hoods are used for warmth. Some blankets have a neck cover permanently attached, others have a detachable neck cover, and some have no attachment points for a neck cover.

== History ==
Horse armour is thought to have been invented around 2500 BC, but proper horse blankets were first manufactured much, much later in 1857, in Troy, New Hampshire.

== Saddle blankets ==
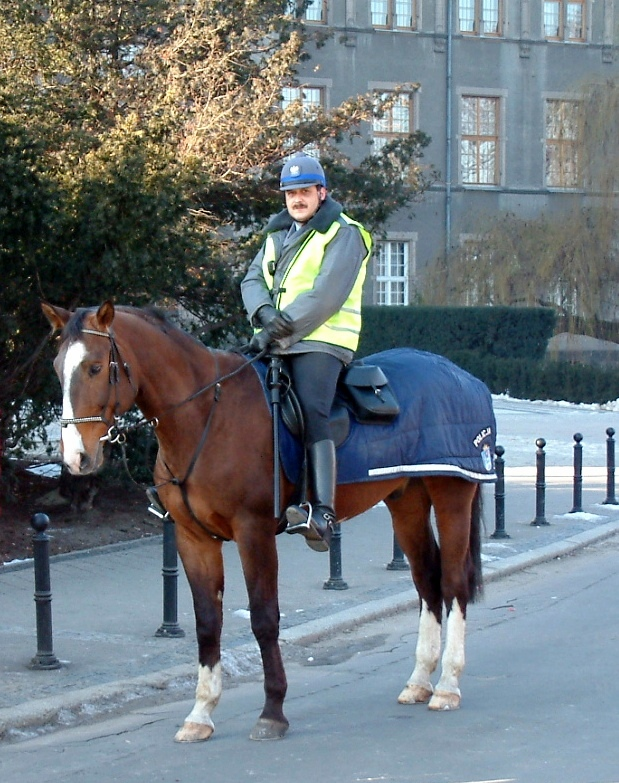
A police horse wearing a quarter sheet

A blanket or pad used under a saddle when a horse is being ridden is called by many names, including a saddle blanket, saddle cloth, numnah, and saddle pad. They usually do not cover the horse's entire body, though a hybrid design that is a cross between a saddle blanket and a horse blanket, called a quarter sheet, is a blanket placed under the saddle but which covers the horse from shoulder to hip while riding. Quarter sheets are sometimes used in cold weather to keep a horse's muscles loosened up when warming up for competition, or on horses that may have to stand around when under saddle and run the risk of stiffening up if their muscles get chilled.

== Other designs ==
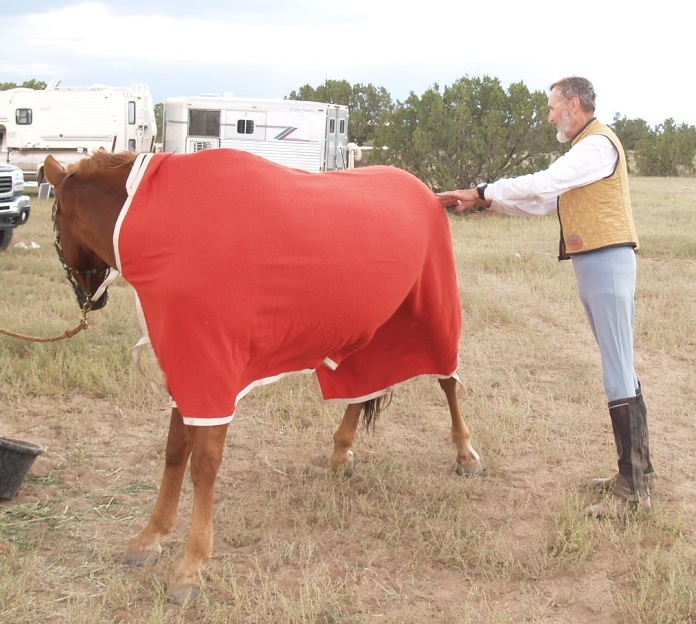
A horse wearing a cooler

A cooler or a mantle, is a large, nearly square blanket with ties that is draped over a horse that is hot and sweaty from an intense workout, or one that has just been bathed and is wet all over. It is commonly made of wool or synthetic fleece, though a few designs are made of woven cotton. It is worn as the horse is being walked to cool down and allows enough air circulation for the horse to dry, but slows the rate of drying to prevent the horse from becoming hypothermic. It is designed so it can be tied shut in front; most designs have a small browband which can be used to keep it positioned well up on the neck, and it may have a loose cord that goes beneath the tail to prevent the wind from blowing it off from the rear, but usually it has no other straps or attachments. It is intended to be used on a horse while the animal is being led or held by a person, and not left on an unattended horse. In windy weather, a loose surcingle may be added to prevent the cooler from blowing completely off.

A traditionally-shaped blanket of loosely crocheted cotton, called an anti-sweat sheet, is used to absorb moisture. Often used alone to wick moisture from the surface of the horse, if placed under a cooler, it is removed when it becomes wet.

A barrier blanket is sometimes used in Australian Thoroughbred racing. This blanket weighs about 40 kilograms and is placed over the horse prior to entering the starting stalls. It is then tied to the back of the stalls after the horse has been loaded and remains in the barrier as the horse jumps. Quite a few horses respond positively to it and are more easily loaded and are calmer in the stalls.

== See also ==
- Horse care
- Horse tack
- Rug (animal covering)
- Caparison
