= Rug (animal covering) =

Garment for domestic animals

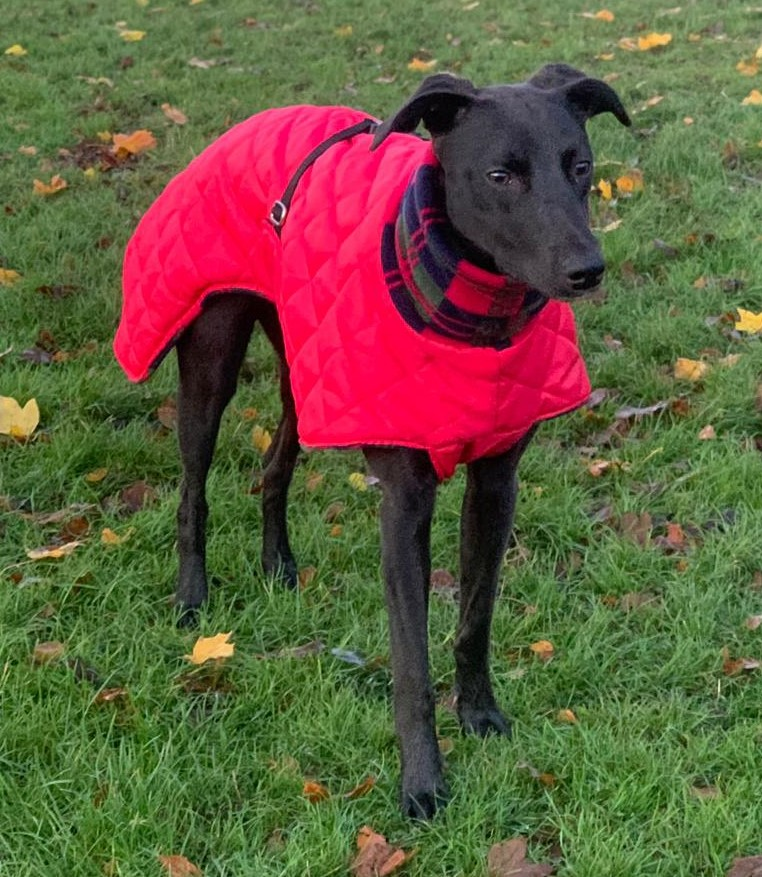
Lurcher with rug. Due to the short fur and slender build of most lurchers, it is common to see them dressed in cold weather.

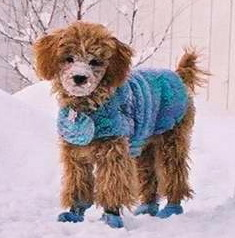
Poodle with rug. Dog booties prevent ice balls from forming between dogs' toes.

A rug (UK), blanket (equine and other livestock, US), or coat (canine and other companion animals, US) is a covering or garment made by humans to protect their pets from the elements, as in a horse rug or dog coat.

Rugs are also used to protect the pelage of show animals, particularly if the wool or fleece is to be judged, as in alpaca fleece sent to an agricultural show, where it would be desirable to have the wool free from dirt and debris. Small dogs and dogs with thin pelage often need protection from extreme weather.

== Dog rugs ==
Dog rugs may be necessary for comfort depending on the breed. Short haired dogs and dogs with lean bodies (like the greyhound) may be unable to regulate heat without a rug. Rugs also protect the undersides of breeds that are low to the ground, such as corgis and Basset hounds. Long haired breeds that have just been shaved, such as a poodle that has been clipped to the skin, may also be given dog rugs for heat.

Neoprene is a common material for making rugs, as it is waterproof and can thus protect a dog from the elements.

== See also ==
- Coat (animal)
- Horse blanket
