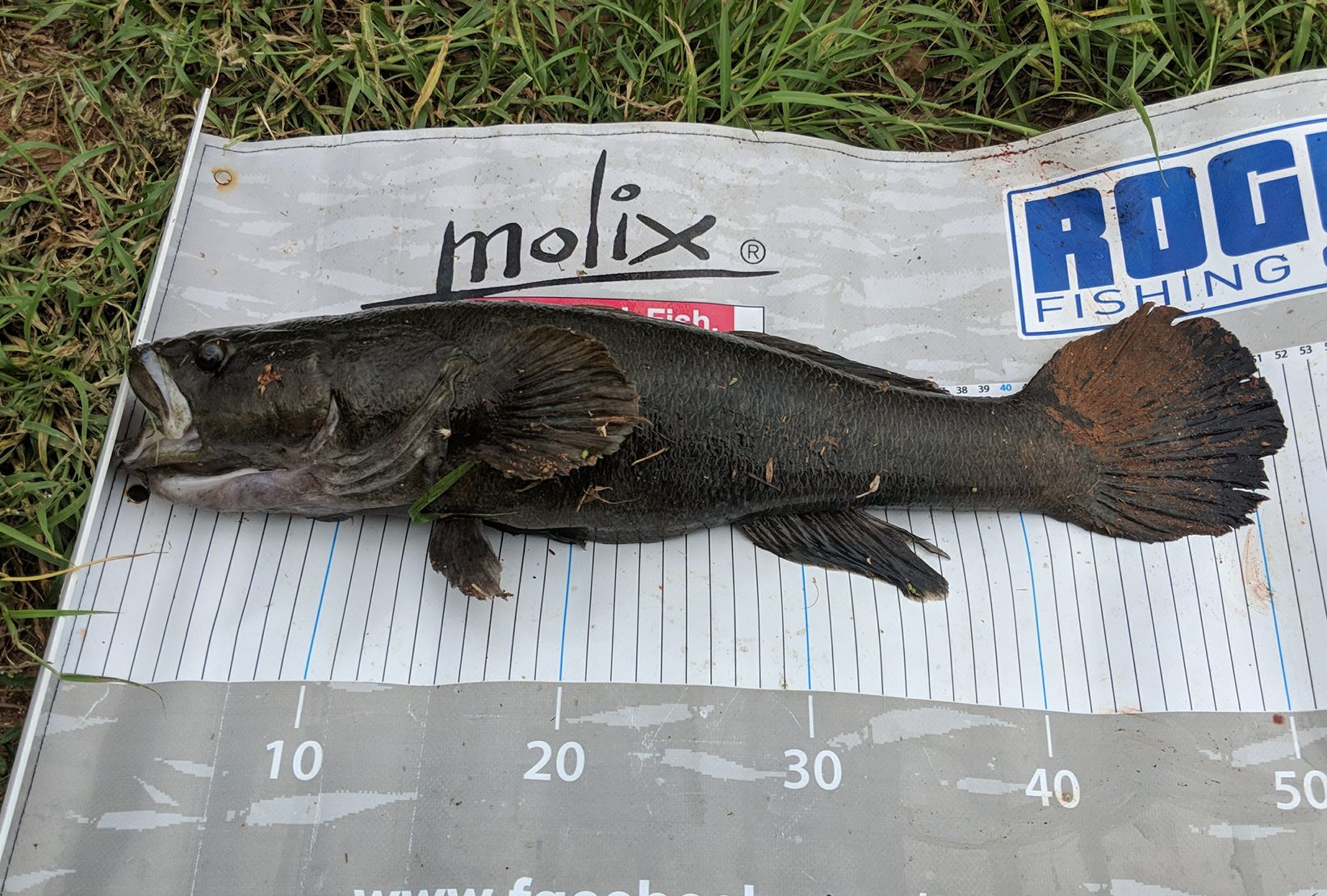
- 51 cm sleepy cod caught in Queensland in 2018

Conservation status
- Least Concern (IUCN 3.1)

Scientific classification
- Kingdom: Animalia
- Phylum: Chordata
- Class: Actinopterygii
- Order: Gobiiformes
- Family: Butidae
- Genus: Oxyeleotris
- Species: O. lineolata

Binomial name
- Oxyeleotris lineolata (Steindachner, 1867)

Synonyms
- Eleotris lineolata Steindachner, 1867

= Sleepy cod =

Species of fish

The sleepy cod (Oxyeleotris lineolata) is a medium-sized fish in the family Butidae, native to tropical fresh waters of northern Australia and questionably from New Guinea. It is a member of the order Perciformes, thus is unrelated to the true cods in the order Gadiformes. Neither are they closely related to the Australian freshwater cods such as the Murray cod of the genus Maccullochella.

They are one of the most favoured freshwater fish in Australia for eating, having white, flaky flesh, low fat content, and a mild flavour.

== Morphology and biology ==
The sleepy cod can reach a length of 51 cm (20 in), though most do not exceed 20 cm (7.9 in). Fish up to 3 kg (6.6 lb) have been caught by anglers.

They are dark brown along the back and paler on the sides, with fuzzy dark lines running along scale rows. Juveniles have a white or cream patch running along the back and top of the head, with brown sides and a white belly.

Females spawn in the benthic zone from October to February. Males guard nests of up to 70,000 eggs until larvae hatch, usually after 5–7 days.

They are usually found in quiet or slow-flowing water in freshwater rivers, creeks, and billabongs throughout northern Australia.
