= Freshwater fish of Australia =

Freshwater fish of Australia are limited to approximately 280 species, even though the Australian continent is larger than the contiguous United States.

The small scale of species found in Australian inland waters is in some part due to the dry conditions of the continent. Rainfall is sporadic over much of the continent, and fish cannot live in many of the desert regions of South Australia and Western Australia. Most freshwater species are found in tropical or subtropical regions.

A large proportion of freshwater species are endemic to Australia. The family Percicthyidae (temperate perches) and other families suspected in reality to lie within it (e.g. Gadopsidae, Nannopercidae) have risen to prominence in and dominate many of its freshwater systems, in contrast to the Northern Hemisphere where freshwater fish faunas are overwhelmingly dominated by the carp family, Cyprinidae. (No cyprinid species is native to Australia). Due to the illegal introduction of carp (Cyprinus carpio), Cyprinidae is now present in a destructive form in Australia. The Galaxiidae have become significant in scale in Australia, most of the world's Galaxias species are found in the continent and neighbouring New Zealand.

The Murray-Darling Basin is one significant freshwater system of Australia. It drains approximately 13% of the continent and contains some of Australia's most significant freshwater fish species including the Murray cod, Australia's largest freshwater fish.

Australian freshwater fish have not fared well since European settlement of Australia in 1788. The majority of Australian freshwater fishes are poorly understood and are under threat due to human activities such clearing of riparian vegetation and siltation associated with agricultural practices, snag removal, overfishing, river regulation through dams and weirs, introduced fish and diseases. Two native fish populations that may have been separate species or sub-species, the Richmond River cod and the Brisbane River cod, are extinct, and a number of other species are listed as endangered or critically endangered.
