= Stream capture =

Geomorphological phenomenon

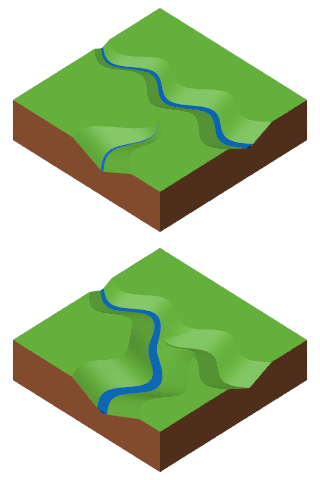
Stream capture by headward erosion, leaving a wind gap

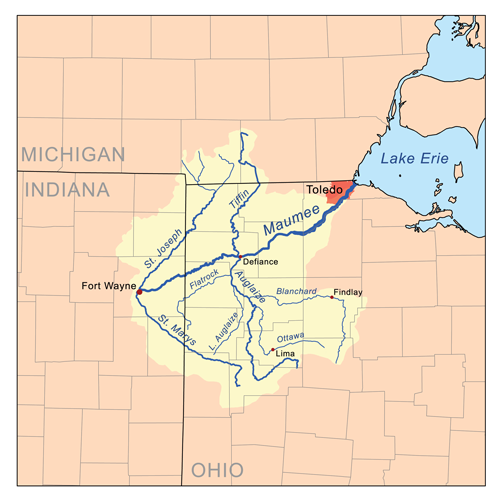
The Maumee River basin. The Maumee, flowing north-east, has broken into part of the Wabash River basin, capturing west-flowing streams and reversing their flow direction on entering it.

Stream capture, river capture, river piracy or stream piracy is a geomorphological phenomenon occurring when a stream or river drainage system or watershed is diverted from its own bed, and flows down to the bed of a neighbouring stream. This can happen for several reasons, including:

- Tectonic earth movements, where the slope of the land changes, and the stream is tipped out of its former course
- Natural damming, such as by a landslide or ice sheet
- Erosion, either
  - Headward erosion of one stream valley upwards into another, or
  - Lateral erosion of a meander through the higher ground dividing the adjacent streams.
  - Within an area of karst topography, where streams may sink, or flow underground (a sinking or losing stream) and then reappear in a nearby stream valley
- Glacier retreat

The cause is not always clear.

The additional water flowing down the capturing stream may accelerate erosion and encourage the development of a canyon (gorge).

The now-dry valley of the original stream is known as a wind gap.

== Capture mechanisms ==
=== Tectonic uplift ===
- Barmah Choke: About 25,000 years ago, an uplift of the plains near Moama on the Cadell Fault first dammed the Murray River and then forced it to take a new course. The new course dug its way through the so-called Barmah Choke and captured the lower course of the Goulburn River for 500 km (310 mi).
- Indus-Sutlej-Sarasvati-Yamuna: The Yamuna earlier flowed into the Ghaggar-Hakra River (identified with the Sarasvati River) and later changed its course due to plate tectonics. The Sutlej River flowed into the current channel of the Ghaggar-Hakra River until the 13th century after which it was captured by the Indus River due to plate tectonics.
- Barrier Range: It was theorised that the original course of the Murray River was to a mouth near Port Pirie where a large delta is still visible protruding into the calm waters of Spencer Gulf. It was suggested that an uplift of the land blocked the river near the southern end of the Flinders Ranges, and the river eventually found its way to a new mouth near Lake Alexandrina. This has since been disproven in favour of findings that ancient Lake Bungunnia overflowed at Swan Reach and the current course is as a result of northward erosion.

=== Glacial damming ===
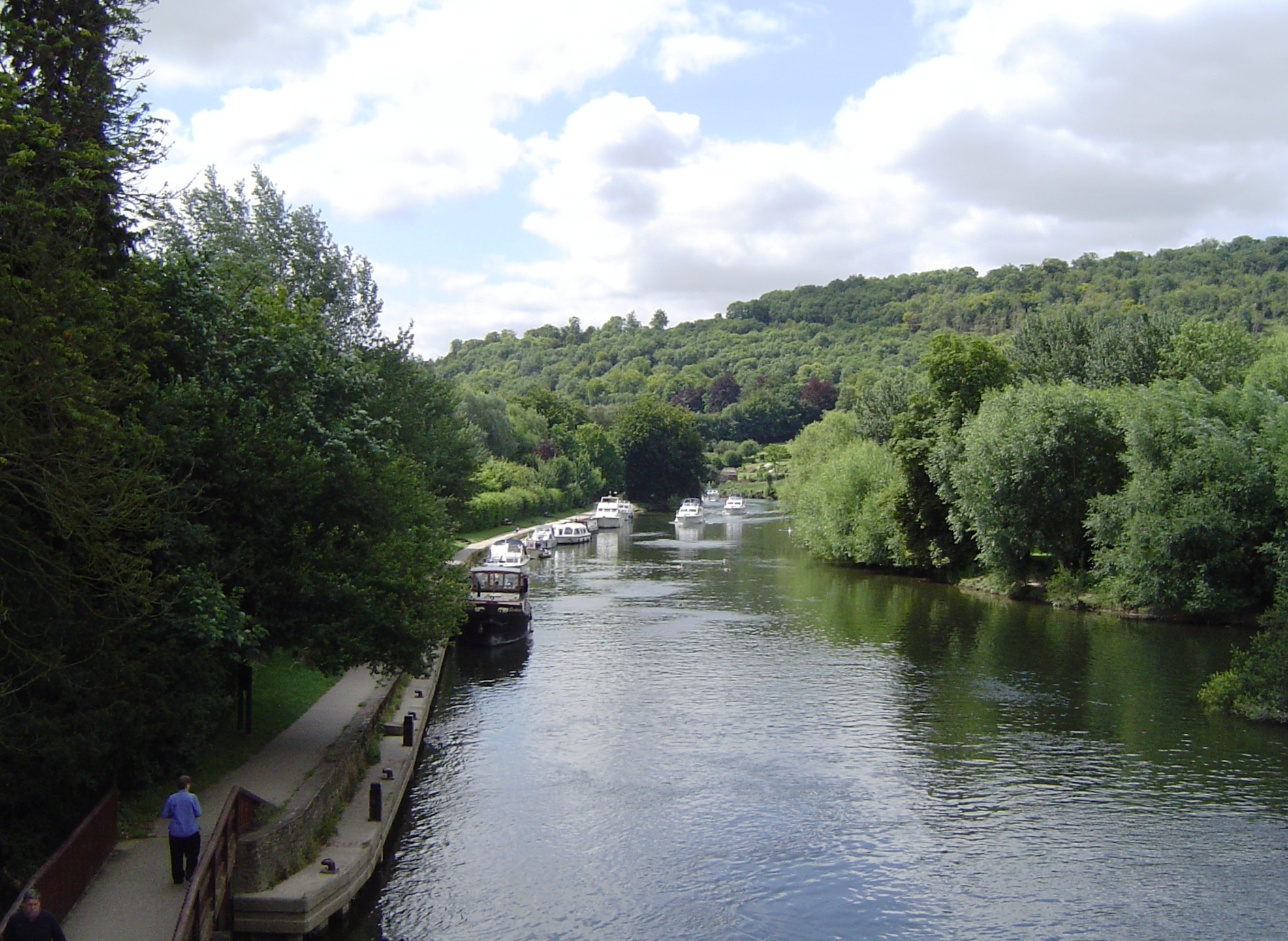
The River Thames as it passes through the Goring Gap

- The River Thames in southern England originally entered the North Sea near Ipswich. About 450,000 years ago, an ice sheet expanding from the north pushed the course of the river southwards, forcing the Thames to cut a new mouth where the mouth of the River Blackwater, Essex now is, north of London. It later moved southwards again to its current position as a result of cutting through the Chiltern Hills at Goring-on-Thames, an event which created the Goring Gap.

=== Headward erosion ===
- The Teays River, captured by the Ohio River.
- The Rio Grande which before capture flowed into a closed basin, Lake Cabeza de Vaca, but after capture flowed into the Gulf of Mexico.
- The ancestral Niger River captured what is now the upper reaches of the Niger which once flowed into an endorheic basin to the east northeast of Timbuktu.
- The River Stour, Kent, largely captured by the River Beult /bɛlt/, River Teise /tiːz/ and others.
- The River Wey, in southern England, the western arm of which is the former upper waters of the River Blackwater (River Loddon).
- The River Rheidol in Wales which has captured the headwaters of other streams and now runs for part of its length in a deep gorge.
- The River Lyd in Devon, England.
- The Black River, in Kings County, Nova Scotia, Canada, captured by the Gaspereau River
- The Casiquiare canal is a distributary of the Orinoco River that is currently in the process of capturing the upper reaches of the Orinoco.
- The Saint Mary's and Saint Joseph rivers were captured by the Maumee River in present-day Fort Wayne, having previously flowed into the Wabash River.

=== Karst ===
- The Donauversickerung (Danube Sink), currently developing in Germany, where a large portion of the upper part of the Danube river sinks into the limestone bedrock, and resurfaces in the Aachtopf spring, a tributary of the River Rhine.

=== Glacier retreat ===
The Slims River was previously fed by meltwater from the Kaskawulsh Glacier in the Saint Elias Mountains in the Yukon and its waters flowed into Kluane Lake and on to the Bering Sea. Because of climate change, the glacier has rapidly receded and the meltwater no longer feeds the Slims. The water instead now feeds the Kaskawulsh River which is a tributary to the Alsek River and drains into the Gulf of Alaska.

== Effect on freshwater life ==
River capture is a shaping force in the biogeography or distribution of many freshwater fish species.

=== New Zealand freshwater fish ===
Geological uplift in the southern South Island led to the divergence of freshwater galaxiid populations isolated by river capture.

=== Australian freshwater fish ===
The formerly massive Great Dividing Range runs the length of the eastern coastline of Australia and has isolated native freshwater fish populations east and west of the range for millions of years. In the last two million years erosion has reduced the Great Dividing Range to a critical point where west-to-east river capture events have been possible. A number of native fish species that originated in the Murray–Darling river system to the west are (or were) found naturally occurring in a number of coastal systems spanning almost the entire length of the range.

None of the river capture events that allowed native fish of the Murray-Darling system to cross into and colonise these East Coast river systems seem to have formed permanent linkages. The colonising Murray-Darling fish in these East Coast river systems have therefore become isolated from their parent species, and due to isolation, the founder effect, genetic drift and natural selection, have become separate species (see allopatric speciation).

Examples include:

- Golden perch (Dawson–Fitzroy river system, central Queensland).
- Eel-tailed catfish (several rivers, northern New South Wales). However, note recent genetic research which now indicates eel-tailed catfish colonised east coast drainages in multiple colonisation events relatively recently (by evolutionary standards) and may subsequently have colonised the Murray–Darling system via an east-to-west river capture event, contrary to usual west-to-east capture events listed here.
- Macquarie perch (Hawkesbury-Nepean rivers, Shoalhaven River, southern New South Wales).
- River blackfish (multiple rivers, Victoria).
- Murray cod, whose eastern species/subspecies are:
  - Eastern freshwater cod (Clarence River system, northern New South Wales. It was also found in the Richmond River system in New South Wales but that population is now extinct.)
  - Brisbane River cod (Brisbane River system, southern Queensland. That population is now extinct, and its exact taxonomic status is not known.)
  - The Mary River cod (Mary River, southern/central Queensland.)
- The mountain galaxias species complex (multiple rivers, southern Queensland, New South Wales, Victoria).

Olive perchlet (Ambassis agassizii), western carp gudgeon (Hypseleotris klungzingeri), pygmy perch (Nannoperca australis) and Australian smelt (Retropinna semoni) also appear to have made crossings into coastal systems, the last two species seemingly many times as they are found in most or all coastal streams in south eastern Australia as well as the Murray-Darling system.

Unfortunately, with the exception of eastern freshwater cod and Mary River cod, it has not been widely recognised that these coastal populations of Murray–Darling native fish are separate species and their classifications have not been updated to reflect this. Many are threatened and two, the Richmond River cod and the Brisbane River cod, have become extinct.

== See also ==
- Lake capture
- Niger River
- Misfit stream
