= Oxyeleotris caeca =

Conservation status
- Vulnerable (IUCN 3.1)

Scientific classification
- Kingdom: Animalia
- Phylum: Chordata
- Class: Actinopterygii
- Division: Teleostei
- Order: Gobiiformes
- Family: Butidae
- Genus: Oxyeleotris
- Species: O. caeca

Binomial name
- Oxyeleotris caeca G. R. Allen, 1996

Species of cavefish

Oxyeleotris caeca or the Kikori blind gudgeon is a cavefish found in the upper Kikori River system. Described in 1996, it is the first cavefish found in Papua New Guinea. There are three specimens kept at the Western Australian Museum, whose lengths range from 83 to 93 millimetres (3.3 to 3.7 in). Its adaptations to cave life include a loss of pigmentation and external eyes. It is unknown how extensive its cave system is. The species is likely closely related to the widespread fimbriate gudgeon. While living in caves, the fish is found in surface waters during the wet season, and is eaten by local inhabitants.

== Discovery and naming ==
While rumours of the fish had reached scientists by 1978, the existence of O. caeca was confirmed only in June 1995 when captured by locals. An effort to find the fish funded by the World Wildlife Fund earlier that year had been unsuccessful.

The species was described in 1996 by Gerald R. Allen, and was the first cavefish described from New Guinea. The female holotype is known as WAM P.31011.001, and is held by the Western Australian Museum on behalf of the Papua New Guinean government. The word caeca is Latin for "blind". The fish was already known to the local people, who caught it for food. In English it has been called the "Kikori blind gudgeon", and in the local language it is known as ihaaribi, meaning "blind".

== Description ==
Three specimens are held by the Western Australian Museum, two females and one male. The three specimens range from 82.6 to 92.3 millimetres (3.25 to 3.63 in) long, with a spine consisting of 28 vertebrae. The species has lost pigmentation in many areas, although not on its upper body. Its vestigial eyes are not externally visible, although some pigmentation remains where the eyes would be. Other members of the Oxyeleotris genus are known to be able to breathe air.

== Habitat ==
Oxyeleotris caeca is known from one location in the upper Kikori River system.

The karst limestones of the island of New Guinea create fragmented ecosystems with unique local conditions, likely facilitating speciation. O. caeca was discovered at 6°34.5′S 143°29.5′E near a village called Kafa/Kafka, in a creek which fed into the Mubi River, itself a tributary of the Kikori River. The location where the fish were collected was 100–200 metres (330–660 ft) downstream of a cave from which the creek flowed out. While it likely originated from the local karst cave system, it is frequently caught in surface waters during the wet season. In surface waters, the species is often found under stones, and is captured by placing a net slightly downstream of a stone before turning that stone over.

It is not known how extensive the underground cave system is, but it is thought to be large. The karst landscape where the fish was found covers around 15,000 square kilometres (5,800 sq mi), making it the largest contiguous karst area in the country. From the location where O. caeca specimens were found, the karst landscape reaches Lake Kutubu, which is 15 kilometres (9.3 mi) northwest. There is some oil and gas drilling in this area. The creek where the holotype was caught was about 650 metres (2,130 ft) above sea level.

== Taxonomy ==
The species is thought to be closely related to the fimbriate gudgeon (Oxyeleotris fimbriata), which is found throughout New Guinea and the Australian Cape York Peninsula. The fimbriate gudgeon is one of the few freshwater fish in New Guinea that occurs on both sides of the New Guinea Highlands. It is also found in the Kikori River. O. caeca is morphologically similar to Oxyeleotris colasi, a cavefish that lives in Western New Guinea, although O. colasi shows greater adaptation to caves.
