= Paniai gudgeon =

Conservation status
- Endangered (IUCN 3.1)

Scientific classification
- Kingdom: Animalia
- Phylum: Chordata
- Class: Actinopterygii
- Division: Teleostei
- Order: Gobiiformes
- Family: Butidae
- Genus: Oxyeleotris
- Species: O. wisselensis

Binomial name
- Oxyeleotris wisselensis G. R. Allen & Boeseman, 1982

Species of fish

The Paniai gudgeon (Oxyeleotris wisselensis) is a species of fish in the family Butidae endemic to the Paniai Lakes (absent from Lake Paniai itself, but present in both Lake Tigi and Tage) and their tributaries in West Papua, Indonesia. This species can reach a standard length up to 11.5 cm (4.5 in). It is popularly used as a bait fish.
