= Lake capture =

Diversion of a lake's drainage

Lake capture (or lacustrine piracy) is a geomorphological process in which the drainage of an internally drained lake basin is diverted into an adjacent drainage basin, commonly through overflow, headward erosion, or tectonic or climatic modification, causing the lake to drain into an adjacent catchment.

The occurrence of a lake capture is mainly controlled by the water balance at the lake's basin and the changes in topography due to erosion, sedimentation, and tectonism. If evaporation at the surface of a lake, plus the water losses through underground infiltration and plant evapotranspiration are high enough to account for all precipitation water collected by the lake, then the lake becomes endorheic, closed, or internally drained. This situation prevails until the water balance changes again and the lake overburdens the limits of its basin or until the lake capture occurs. Opening the drainage of an endorheic lacustrine basin by fluvial erosion generally implies a lake capture.

Lake captures are therefore very sensitive to the preexisting topography as well as to climatic and lithological factors. A climatic change towards more humid conditions can result in a higher water level in the internally drained basin, eventually causing overflow, this . In a longer time-scale, sediment colmatation of the lacustrine basin can also lead to overflow. Both can hinder the relative importance of the capture process carried out by erosion.

Examples of lake capture and drainage integration include the Late Neogene evolution of the Ebro Basin in Spain, which transitioned from an internally drained basin to an externally drained system through overflow and erosion-driven capture, and the Pleistocene Lake Bonneville in North America, which overflowed its basin threshold at Red Rock Pass, resulting in catastrophic drainage into the Snake River system.

== See also ==
- River capture
- Regressive erosion
