= Brisbane River cod =

Extinct population of fish

The Brisbane River cod was a unique form of Maccullochella cod that occurred naturally in the Brisbane River system, an east coast river system in south east Queensland, Australia. The Brisbane River Cod was known as the Bumgur (meaning blue cod) by the Jinibara people centred in the Kilcoy region and the junction of the Stanley and Brisbane Rivers. Their exact taxonomic status is not known, but based on several genetic studies it is suspected that Brisbane River Cod were a species intermediate between eastern freshwater cod (Maccullochella ikei) of the Clarence River and Richmond River systems in northern New South Wales and Mary River cod of the Mary River in southern Queensland.

All naturally occurring Maccullochella cod in east coast drainages ultimately originate from Murray cod, Maccullochella peelii that entered an east coast river system, likely the Clarence, via a natural river capture event somewhere between 0.62 and 1.62 million years ago (mean estimate 1.1 million years ago), as estimated by DNA divergence rates.

Brisbane River cod are extinct, from overfishing, habitat destruction and siltation, and whole-of-catchment scale bushfires and ash fish kills in the 1930s.

The Brisbane River has now been restocked with Mary River cod from the Mary River system. The Brisbane River, Cod Recovery Project was started in 2020 to re-establish the presence of a Maccullochella apex predator in the catchment. Surveys conducted in 2023 indicate exceptional survivability and growth of fingerlings released.
