= Richmond River cod =

Extinct species of fish

The Richmond River cod was a form of Maccullochella cod, now believed to have been eastern freshwater cod, Maccullochella ikei, that occurred naturally in the Richmond River system, an east coast river system in north-east New South Wales, Australia.

Eastern freshwater cod in turn are a species of Maccullochella cod found in east coast drainages and originating from Murray cod, Maccullochella peelii, that crossed the Great Dividing Range and entered east coast drainages from a river capture event between 0.62 and 1.62 million years ago (mean estimate 1.1 million years ago).

Richmond River cod are extinct, from overfishing, habitat destruction including gross siltation, and whole-of-catchment scale bushfires and fish kills in the 1930s.

The Richmond River system has now been restocked with small numbers of eastern freshwater cod from the Clarence River system, but these appear to have been insufficient to re-establish populations; there is no evidence of these stocked fish reproducing.
