= Oxyeleotris nullipora =

Poreless gudgeon

Conservation status
- Least Concern (IUCN 3.1)

Scientific classification
- Kingdom: Animalia
- Phylum: Chordata
- Class: Actinopterygii
- Order: Gobiiformes
- Family: Butidae
- Genus: Oxyeleotris
- Species: O. nullipora

Binomial name
- Oxyeleotris nullipora T. R. Roberts, 1978

Species of fish

Oxyeleotris nullipora, the poreless gudgeon, is a gudgeon of the genus Oxyeleotris, a freshwater fish found in Australia and Papua New Guinea.

== Description ==
The poreless gudgeon has a cylindrical body, a flattened head with a straight profile and a length of 4.5–5.5 cm (1.8–2.2 in) SL. The fish has two dorsal fins, the first being considerably smaller and the second about 67% as tall as the body is deep. Caudal and pectoral fins are rounded and the pelvic fins are slightly shorter than the pectorals. Colour is brown, darker on the dorsal surface fading to whitish on the belly and under the head. There is often a number of dark brown chevron like markings on the sides with a pair of dark blotches positioned at the upper and lower base of the tail fin. There are three dusky bands spreading backwards from the eye as well as a dark spot with a white centre above the pectoral fin base. The fins are generally clear to whitish and there are small dark spots on the dorsal fins giving the appearance of stripes with similar spots on the caudal fin forming vertical bands.

== Distribution ==
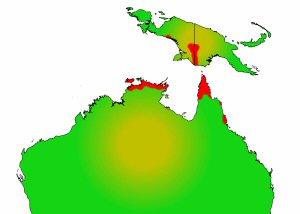
Distribution of Oxyeleotris nulliporus

The poreless gudgeon occurs in Cape York and Arnhem Land in northern Australia and also southern New Guinea. Within Queensland the fish ranges from around Ingham to Cairns, particularly the lower Tully River. There is a separate population in the Hope Vale region and the Cape York population ranges from the Endeavour River up the eastern coast, around the tip and south to the Edward River on the Gulf of Carpentaria. The Arnhem Land population extends from the Reynolds River east to the Giddy River as well the Tiwi Islands. In New Guinea, the fish is found Fly River further west to around Timika.

== Habitat ==
O.nulliporos is often found in wetlands on floodplains, smaller slow flowing creeks, backwaters and lily ponds where they tend to be found in the shallow margins among thick aquatic vegetation.. The fish is bottom dwelling and is found over a soft bottom in both clear and turbid water with a low pH.

== Lifecycle/Reproduction ==
Spawning commence at temperatures above about 24–25 °C (75–77 °F). The female lays approximately 30 eggs, 2 mm (0.079 in) in diameter, on the underside of overhanging rocks and crevices. The eggs are translucent when laid and ovoid becoming darker as they develop. The male guards the eggs until they hatch in about 8 to 10 days. The newly hatched fry are about 3 mm (0.12 in) in length.

== Utility to humans ==
Reportedly this species makes excellent aquarium fish but are rarely available in the hobby. They are one of Australia's smallest gudgeons and make peaceful aquarium subjects.
