= Lepidocottus =

Lepidocottus Temporal range: Early Oligocene to Early Miocene

Scientific classification
- Kingdom: Animalia
- Phylum: Chordata
- Class: Actinopterygii
- Division: Teleostei
- Order: Gobiiformes
- Family: Butidae
- Genus: †Lepidocottus; Sauvage, 1875

Type species
- †Cottus aries Agassiz, 1839

Species
- See text

Extinct genus of fishes

Lepidocottus ("scaly Cottus") is an extinct genus of freshwater, marine and estuarine butid goby that inhabited Europe during the Oligocene and Early Miocene.

The following species are known:

- †L. aries (Agassiz, 1839) (type species) - Late Oligocene of France (Aix-en-Provence Formation), potentially Early Oligocene of France (Céreste lagerstatte)
- †L. martinii (Reichenbacher & Uhlig, 2002) [otolith] - Late Oligocene of Germany and likely earliest Miocene (Aquitanian) of France
- †L. papyraceus (Agassiz, 1832) - Early Oligocene of Italy (Monteviale fossil site)
- †L. schadi (Weiler, 1963) [otolith] - Late Oligocene of Germany
- †L. sectus (Stinton & Kissling, 1968) [otolith] - Late Oligocene & Early Miocene of Switzerland & France

Some authorities have treated the placement of L. papyraceus in Lepidocottus as uncertain, although other studies treat it as a member of the genus. Specimens from the Middle Miocene of Germany, initially classified in the species L. brevis, are now known to belong to a distinct extinct genus, Eleogobius. Another former species, L. multipinnatus, is now placed again in the extant Gobius. One other species, L. elongatus Bassani, 1889 from the Miocene of Italy, is of uncertain taxonomy.

Both skeletal species in the genus were initially described as sculpins in the genus Cottus. They were later identified as morphologically distinct and moved to their own genus Lepidocottus. Later, these specimens were identified as closely resembling modern gobies, and moved to the modern genus Gobius. However, a 2013 study on several well-preserved specimens of L. aries, which preserved otoliths in addition to complete skeletons, found them to belong to the Butidae, which has been affirmed by later studies. This study also identified several other Lepidocottus species represented only by isolated otoliths between the Early Oligocene and Early Miocene. Lepidocottus otoliths do not appear beyond the Aquitanian stage. Most Lepidocottus species were freshwater or estuarine, although otoliths referred to L. martinii have been identified from a marine deposit.
