= Prionobutis =

Scientific classification
- Kingdom: Animalia
- Phylum: Chordata
- Class: Actinopterygii
- Division: Teleostei
- Order: Gobiiformes
- Family: Butidae
- Genus: Prionobutis; Bleeker, 1874

Type species
- Eleotris dasyrhynchus Günther, 1868

Genus of fishes

Prionobutis is a genus of fishes in the family Butidae native to Borneo and Papua New Guinea.

== Species ==
The recognized species in this genus are:

- Prionobutis dasyrhynchus (Günther, 1868)
- Prionobutis microps (M. C. W. Weber, 1907) (small-eyed loter)
