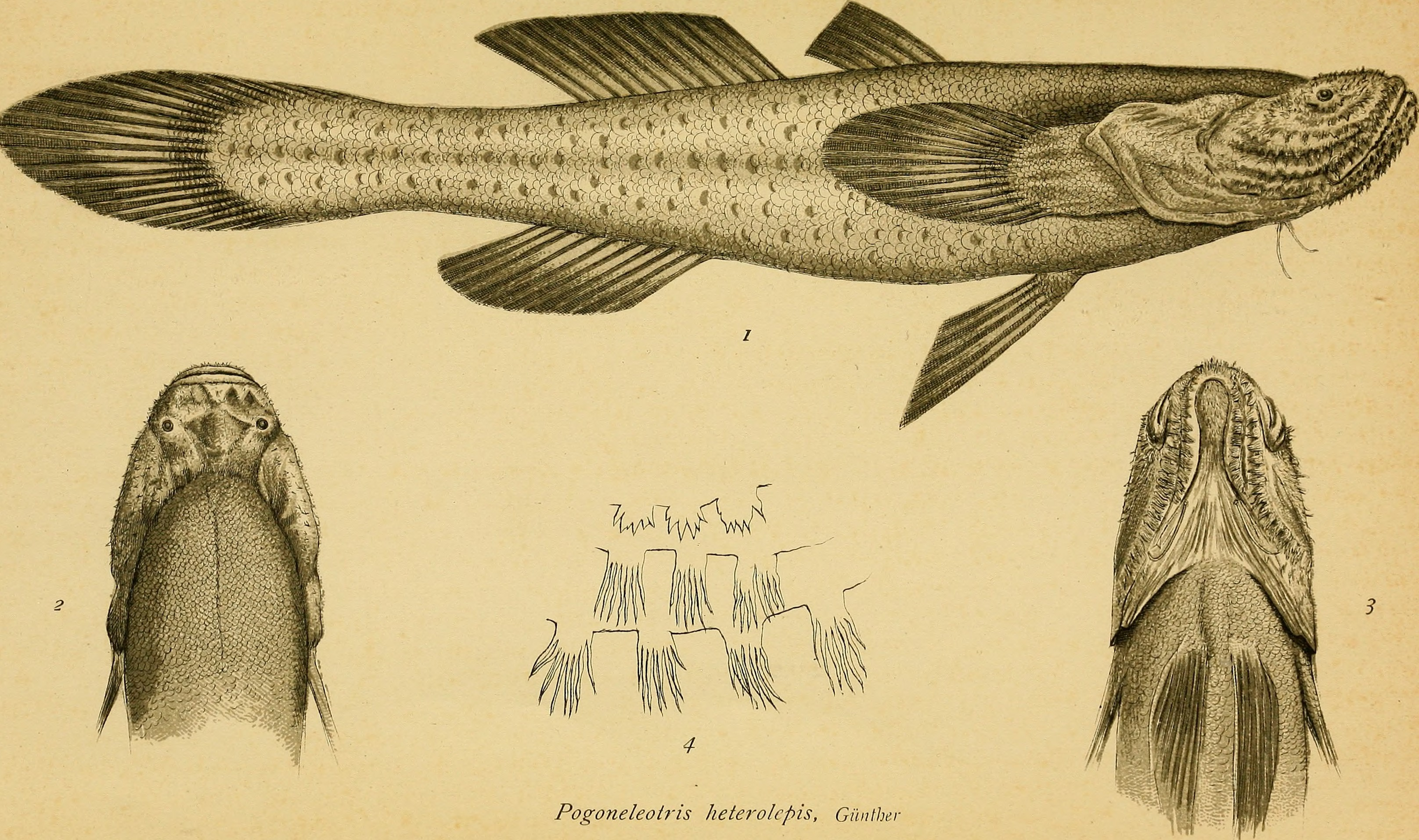

Conservation status
- Data Deficient (IUCN 3.1)

Scientific classification
- Kingdom: Animalia
- Phylum: Chordata
- Class: Actinopterygii
- Division: Teleostei
- Order: Gobiiformes
- Family: Butidae
- Genus: Pogoneleotris; Bleeker, 1875
- Species: P. heterolepis

Binomial name
- Pogoneleotris heterolepis (Günther, 1869)

Synonyms
- Eleotris heterolepis Günther, 1869

= Pogoneleotris =

Species of fish

Pogoneleotris heterolepis is a species of fish in the family Butidae endemic to the marine and brackish waters of Malaysia. This species is the only known member of its genus.
