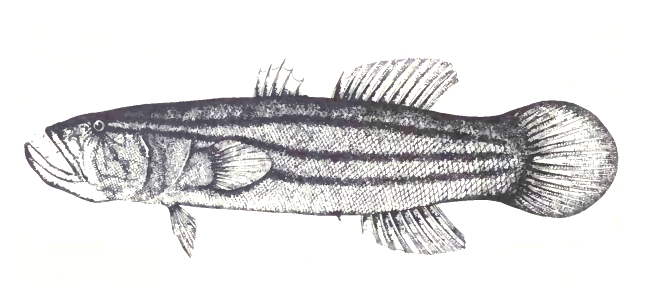
- Paloa polylepis

Scientific classification
- Kingdom: Animalia
- Phylum: Chordata
- Class: Actinopterygii
- Order: Gobiiformes
- Family: Butidae
- Genus: Paloa; Herre, 1927

Type species
- Paloa polylepis Herre, 1927

= Paloa =

Genus of fishes

Paloa is a small genus of fishes in the family Butidae native to tropical marine waters of the China Sea and fresh and brackish waters of Philippines.

== Species ==
The recognized species in this genus are:

- Paloa polylepis Herre, 1927
- Paloa villadolidi Roxas & Ablan, 1940
