= Fimbriate gudgeon =

Scientific classification
- Kingdom: Animalia
- Phylum: Chordata
- Class: Actinopterygii
- Order: Gobiiformes
- Family: Butidae
- Genus: Oxyeleotris
- Species: O. fimbriata

Binomial name
- Oxyeleotris fimbriata (M. C. W. Weber, 1907)

Synonyms
- Eleotris fimbriatus M. C. W. Weber, 1907; Oxyeleotris fimbriatus (M. C. W. Weber, 1907)

Species of fish

The fimbriate gudgeon (Oxyeleotris fimbriata) is a species of sleeper goby native to the fresh waters of New Guinea and Australia. This species can reach a standard length of 18 cm (7.1 in), though most do not exceed 10 cm (3.9 in).
