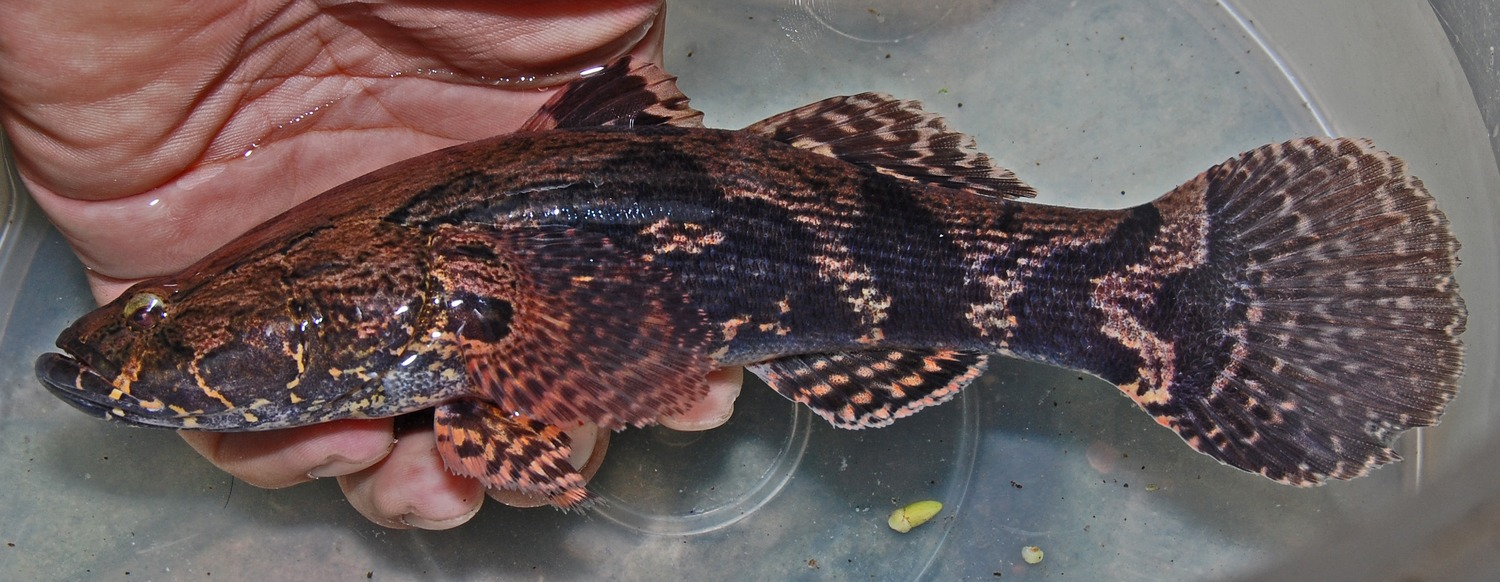

Conservation status
- Least Concern (IUCN 3.1)

Scientific classification
- Kingdom: Animalia
- Phylum: Chordata
- Class: Actinopterygii
- Division: Teleostei
- Order: Gobiiformes
- Family: Butidae
- Genus: Oxyeleotris
- Species: O. marmorata

Binomial name
- Oxyeleotris marmorata (Bleeker, 1852)

Synonyms
- Eleotris marmorata Bleeker, 1852; Bostrichthys marmoratus (Bleeker, 1852); Gigantogobius jordani Fowler, 1905; Callieleotris platycephalus Fowler, 1934

= Oxyeleotris marmorata =

Species of fish

The marble goby (Oxyeleotris marmorata) is a widely distributed species of fish in the family Butidae native to fresh and brackish waters of the Mekong and Chao Praya basins, as well as rivers and other water bodies in Cambodia (where it is called ត្រីដំរី "TreiDamrei"), Thailand (where it is called ปลาบู่), Malaysia, Singapore (where it is called "Soon Hock" fish), Indochina, the Philippines, and Indonesia. It is among the largest gobioid fish, reaching a length of 65 cm (26 in), though most do not exceed 30 cm (12 in).

== Uses ==
This species is an economically important fish, being sought after by local commercial fisheries and farmed. It can also be found in the aquarium trade.

Live marbled gobies for sale at a T&T supermarket in Vancouver

It is highly popular among the Chinese community due to the flavor and texture of its white flesh, and is believed to have healing properties. It is said, best eaten after surgeries or childbirths. In Malaysia, commercialization of this type of fish is not widely established. Demands are largely dependent on wild populations, thus fetching high prices in the market. In Thailand, this species has been cited in to the folk tale of Central Thailand's pla bu thong ("ปลาบู่ทอง"; golden goby) tales have known as well, and was taken to create a television series and movies several times. The content is similar to Cinderella.
