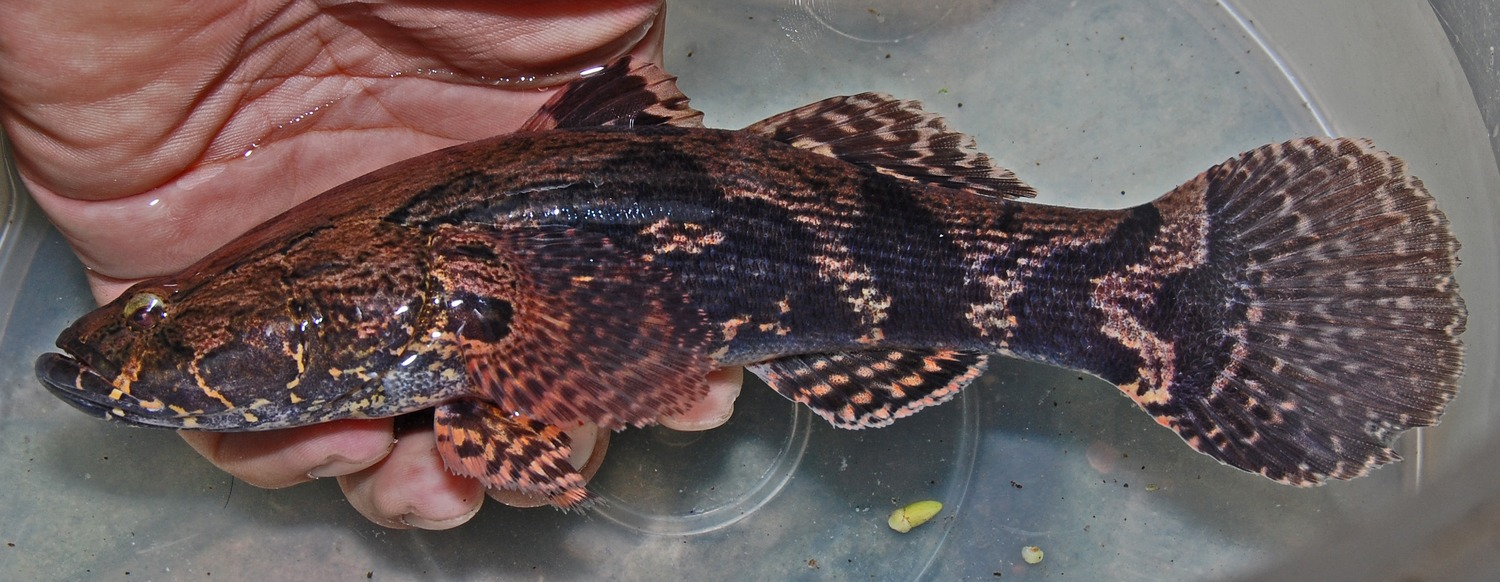
- Marble Goby (O. marmorata)

Scientific classification
- Kingdom: Animalia
- Phylum: Chordata
- Class: Actinopterygii
- Order: Gobiiformes
- Family: Butidae
- Genus: Oxyeleotris; Bleeker, 1874

Type species
- Eleotris marmorata Bleeker, 1852

= Oxyeleotris =

Genus of fishes

Oxyeleotris is a genus of sleeper gobies mostly restricted to Australia and New Guinea, though some (O. marmorata, O. siamensis, O. urophthalmoides and O. urophthalmus) are found in Southeast Asia.

They are found in a wide range of fresh and brackish water habitats, and the two species O. caeca and O. colasi are cave-dwellers.

== Species ==
There 19 recognized species in this genus are:

- Oxyeleotris albooculata (Herre, 1927)
- Oxyeleotris altipinna G. R. Allen & Renyaan, 1996
- Oxyeleotris aruensis (M. C. W. Weber, 1911) (Aru gudgeon)
- Oxyeleotris caeca G. R. Allen, 1996
- Oxyeleotris colasi Pouyaud, Kadarusman, Hadiaty, Slembrouck, Lemauk, Kusumah & Keith, 2013
- Oxyeleotris fimbriata (M. C. W. Weber, 1907) (fimbriate gudgeon)
- Oxyeleotris herwerdenii (M. C. W. Weber, 1910) (blackbanded gauvina)
- Oxyeleotris heterodon (M. C. W. Weber, 1907) (Sentani gudgeon)
- Oxyeleotris lineolata (Steindachner, 1867) (sleepy cod)
- Oxyeleotris marmorata (Bleeker, 1852) (marble goby)
- Oxyeleotris mertoni (M. C. W. Weber, 1911)
- Oxyeleotris nullipora T. R. Roberts, 1978 (poreless gudgeon)
- Oxyeleotris paucipora T. R. Roberts, 1978 (few-pored gudgeon)
- Oxyeleotris selheimi (W. J. Macleay, 1884) (giant gudgeon)
- Oxyeleotris siamensis (Günther, 1861)
- Oxyeleotris stagnicola G. R. Allen, Hortle & Renyaan, 2000 (Swamp gudgeon)
- Oxyeleotris urophthalmoides (Bleeker, 1853)
- Oxyeleotris urophthalmus (Bleeker, 1851)
- Oxyeleotris wisselensis G. R. Allen & Boeseman, 1982 (Paniai gudgeon)
