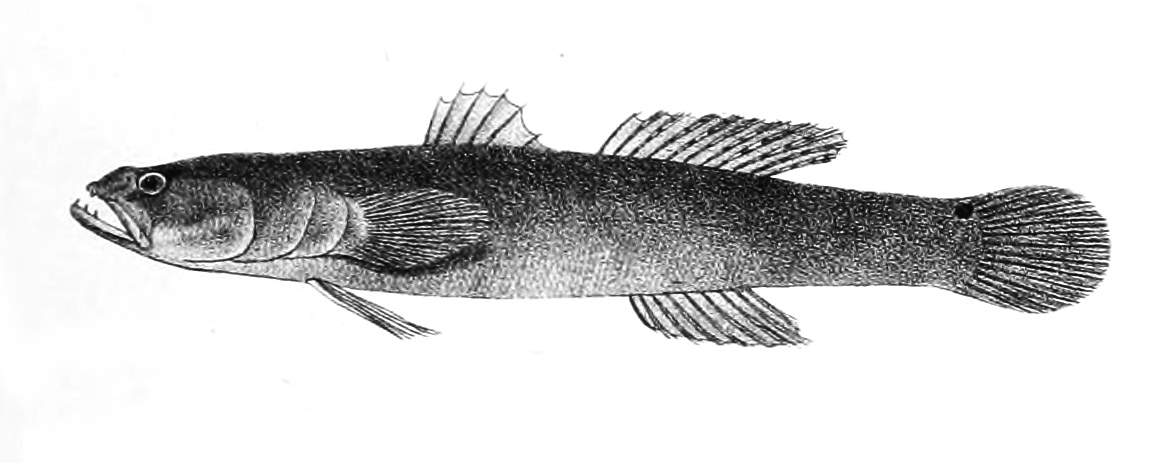
- Eleotris macrodon

Scientific classification
- Kingdom: Animalia
- Phylum: Chordata
- Class: Actinopterygii
- Order: Gobiiformes
- Family: Butidae
- Genus: Odonteleotris; T. N. Gill, 1863

Type species
- Eleotris macrodon Bleeker, 1853

= Odonteleotris =

Genus of fishes

Odonteleotris is a small genus of fishes in the family Butidae native to tropical marine waters of the western Pacific Ocean and fresh and brackish waters of southern Asia.

== Species ==
The recognized species in this genus are:

- Odonteleotris canina (Bleeker, 1849)
- Odonteleotris macrodon (Bleeker, 1853) (Gangetic sleeper)
