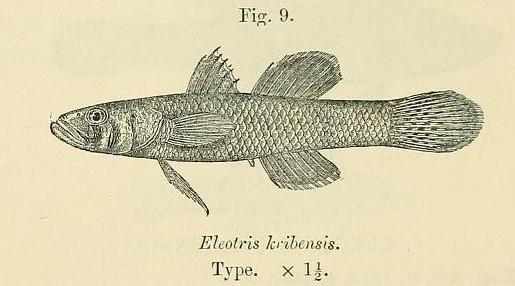
- Kribia kribensis

Scientific classification
- Kingdom: Animalia
- Phylum: Chordata
- Class: Actinopterygii
- Order: Gobiiformes
- Family: Butidae
- Genus: Kribia; Herre, 1946

Type species
- Eleotris kribensis Boulenger, 1907

= Kribia =

Genus of fishes

Kribia is a genus of sleeper gobies from the family Butidae which are endemic to freshwater habitats in West and Middle Africa.

== Species ==
The recognized species in this genus are:

- Kribia kribensis (Boulenger, 1907)
- Kribia leonensis (Boulenger, 1916)
- Kribia nana (Boulenger, 1901)
- Kribia uellensis (Boulenger, 1913)
