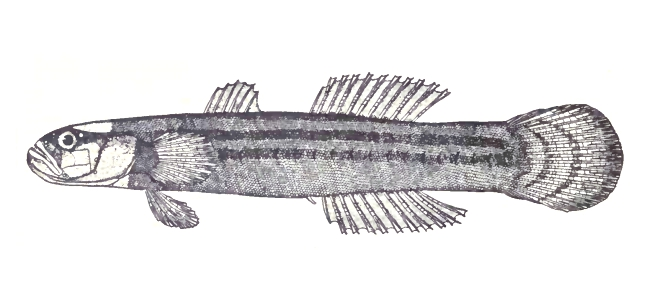
- Parviparma straminea

Conservation status
- Data Deficient (IUCN 3.1)

Scientific classification
- Kingdom: Animalia
- Phylum: Chordata
- Class: Actinopterygii
- Division: Teleostei
- Order: Gobiiformes
- Family: Butidae
- Genus: Parviparma
- Species: P. straminea

Binomial name
- Parviparma straminea Herre, 1927

= Parviparma =

Species of fish

Parviparma straminea is a species of fish in the family Butidae endemic to the Philippines. This species is the only known member of its genus.
