= Incara =

Conservation status
- Least Concern (IUCN 3.1)

Scientific classification
- Kingdom: Animalia
- Phylum: Chordata
- Class: Actinopterygii
- Order: Gobiiformes
- Family: Butidae
- Genus: Incara; Visweswara Rao, 1971
- Species: I. multisquamatus

Binomial name
- Incara multisquamatus Visweswara Rao, 1971

Genus of fishes

Incara multisquamatus is a species of fish in the family Butidae known from brackish waters along the coasts of India and Australia. This species grows to a length of 6 cm (2.4 in). This species is the only known member of its genus.
