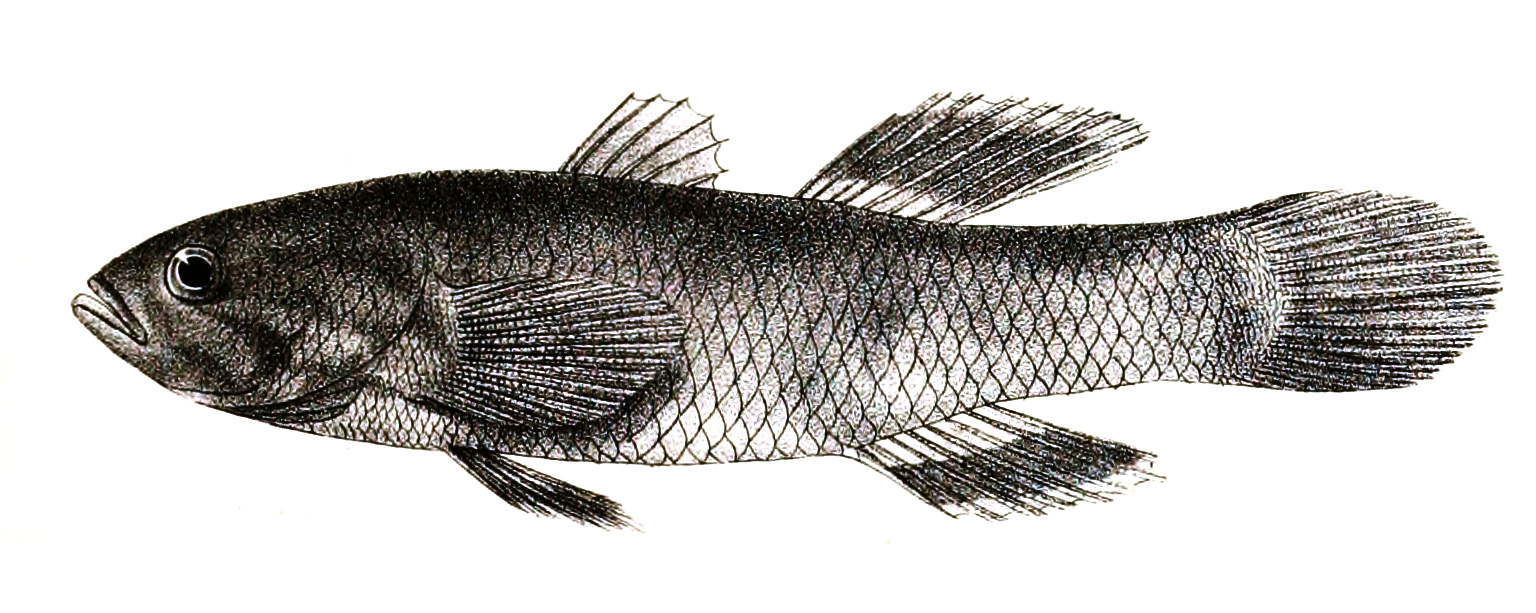
- Ophiocara porocephala

Scientific classification
- Kingdom: Animalia
- Phylum: Chordata
- Class: Actinopterygii
- Order: Gobiiformes
- Family: Butidae
- Genus: Ophiocara; T. N. Gill, 1863

Type species
- Eleotris ophicephalus Valenciennes, 1837

= Ophiocara =

Genus of fishes

Ophiocara is a genus of fishes in the family Butidae native to tropical waters of Indo-Pacific.

== Species ==
The recognized species in this genus are:

- Ophiocara gigas Kobayashi and Sato, 2023
- Ophiocara macrolepidota (Bloch, 1792)
- Ophiocara macrostoma Kobayashi and Sato, 2023
- Ophiocara porocephala (Valenciennes, 1837) (northern mud gudgeon)
- Ophiocara ophicephalus (Valenciennes, 1837) (spangled gudgeon, bumblebee, mullet gudgeon)
