= Headward erosion =

Geographical process

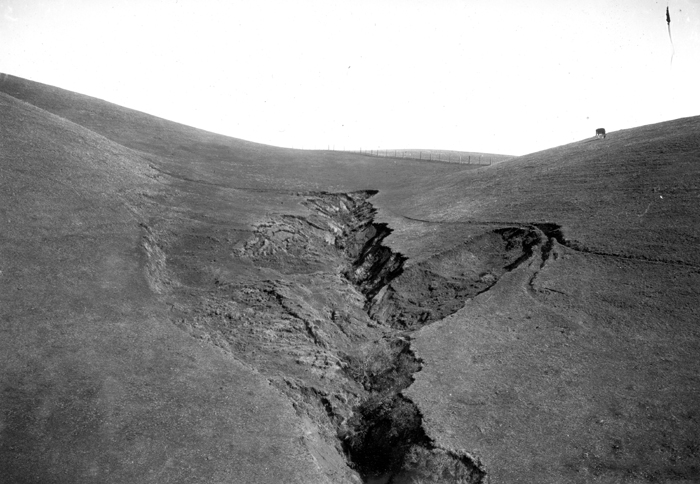
Headward erosion is demonstrated in this 1906 photo taken near Mount Tamalpais in Marin County, California. Groundwater sapping is causing this gully to lengthen up the slope.

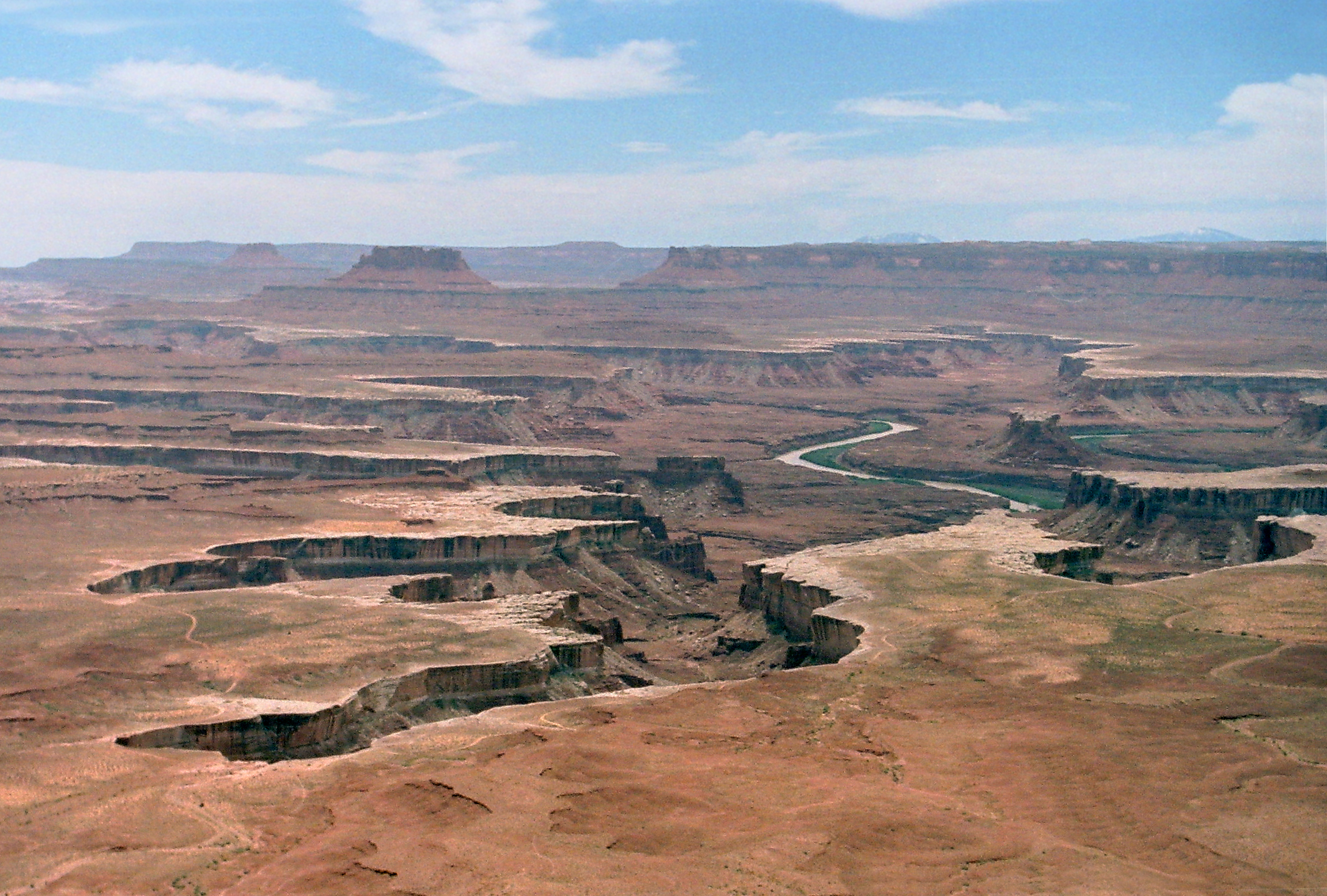
At Canyonlands National Park in Utah, sheets of water flow across the plains and enter the canyons. As they do so, the top edge of the canyon erodes back into the plain above, both lengthening and widening the canyon. Widening of a canyon by erosion inside the canyon below the top, because of the flow of the stream inside the canyon, is not called headward erosion.

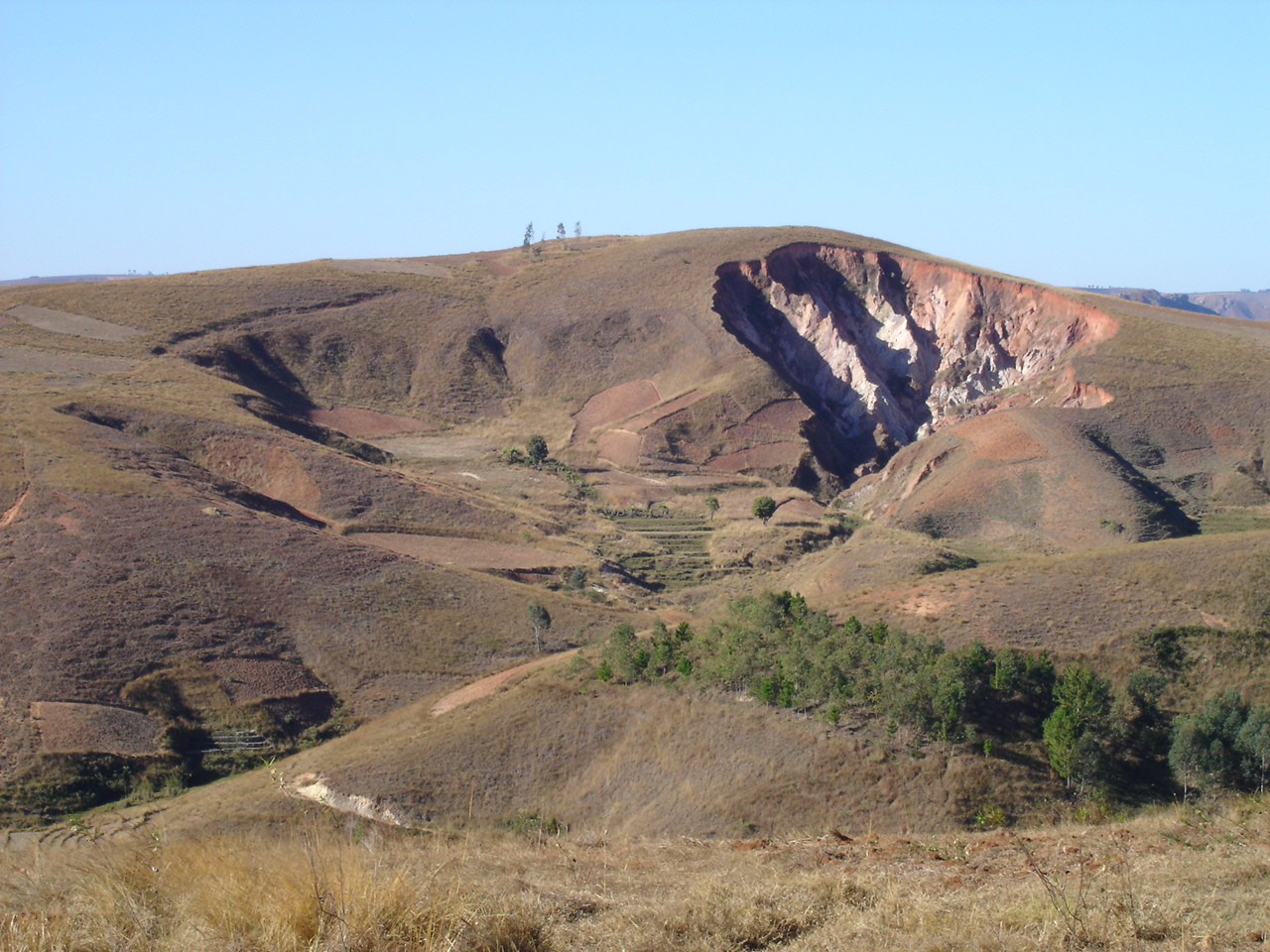
Active headward erosion (lavaka) on right, with inactive, largely infilled older examples to left

Headward erosion is erosion at the origin of a stream channel, which causes the origin to move back away from the direction of the stream flow, lengthening the stream channel. It can also refer to the widening of a canyon by erosion along its very top edge, when sheets of water first enter the canyon from a more roughly planar surface above it, such as at Canyonlands National Park in Utah. When sheets of water on a roughly planar surface first enter a depression in it, this erodes the top edge of the depression. The stream is forced to grow longer at the very top of the stream, which moves its origin back, or causes the canyon formed by the stream to grow wider as the process repeats. Widening of the canyon by erosion inside the canyon, below the canyon side top edge, or origin or the stream, such as erosion caused by the streamflow inside it, is not called headward erosion.

Headward erosion is a fluvial process of erosion that lengthens a stream, a valley or a gully at its head and also enlarges its drainage basin. The stream erodes away at the rock and soil at its headwaters in the opposite direction that it flows. Once a stream has begun to cut back, the erosion is sped up by the steep gradient the water is flowing down. As water erodes a path from its headwaters to its mouth at a standing body of water, it tries to cut an ever-shallower path. This leads to increased erosion at the steepest parts, which is headward erosion. If this continues long enough, it can cause a stream to break through into a neighboring watershed and capture drainage that previously flowed to another stream.

For example, headward erosion by the Shenandoah River, a tributary of the Potomac River in the U.S. state of Virginia, permitted the Shenandoah to capture successively the original upstream segments of Beaverdam Creek, Gap Run and Goose Creek, three smaller tributaries of the Potomac. As each capture added to the Shenandoah's effluent, or discharge, it accelerated the process of headward erosion until the Shenandoah captured all drainage to the Potomac west of the Blue Ridge Mountains.

== Stream types created by headward erosion ==
Three kinds of streams are formed by headward erosion: insequent streams, subsequent streams, and obsequent and resequent streams (See Fluvial landforms of streams.) Insequent streams form by random headward erosion, usually from sheetflow of water over the landform surface. The water collects in channels where the velocity and erosional power increase, cutting into and extending the heads of gullies. Subsequent streams form by selective headward erosion by cutting away at less resistive rocks in the terrain. Obsequent and resequent streams form after time in an area of insequent or subsequent streams. Obsequent streams are insequent streams that now flow in an opposite direction of the original drainage pattern. Resequent streams are subsequent streams that have also changed direction from their original drainage patterns.

== Drainage patterns created by headward erosion ==
Headward erosion creates three major kinds of drainage patterns: dendritic patterns, trellis patterns, and rectangular and angular patterns.

- Dendritic patterns form in homogenous landforms where the underlying bedrock has no structural control over where the water flows. They have a very characteristic pattern of branching at acute angles with no common or similarly repeating pattern.
- Trellis patterns form where the underlying bedrock contains repeating weaker and stronger types of rock. The trellis pattern cuts down deeper into the weaker bedrock, and is characterized by nearly parallel streams that branch at higher angles.
- Rectangular and angular patterns are characterized by branching of tributaries at nearly right angles and tributaries which themselves exhibit right-angle bends in their channels. These usually form in jointed igneous bedrocks, horizontal sedimentary beds with well-developed jointing or intersecting faults.

Four minor kinds of drainage patterns also can be created: radial patterns, annular patterns,
centripetal patterns and parallel patterns.

- Radial patterns are characterized by flow of water outward from a central point, such as down a newly formed cinder volcano cone or an intrusive dome.
- Annular patterns form on domes of alternating weak and hard bedrocks. The pattern formed is similar to that of a bullseye when viewed from above, as the weaker bedrocks are eroded and the harder are left in place.
- Centripetal patterns form where water flows into a central location, such as in a karst limestone terrain where the water flows down into a sinkhole and then underground.
- Parallel patterns are not very common and form on unidirectional regional slope or parallel landform features. They are usually limited to a small, generalized area.

== See also ==
- Lavaka
