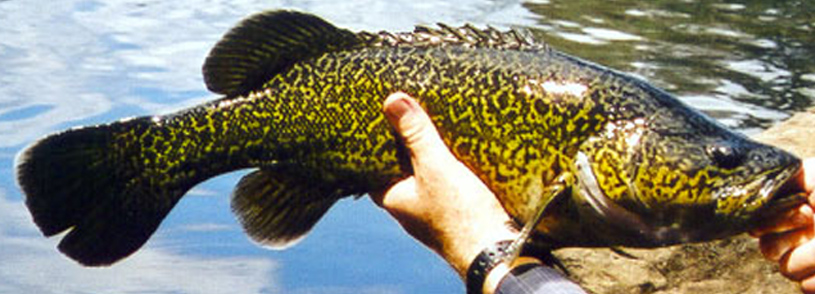

Conservation status
- Endangered (IUCN 3.1)

Scientific classification
- Kingdom: Animalia
- Phylum: Chordata
- Class: Actinopterygii
- Order: Centrarchiformes
- Family: Percichthyidae
- Genus: Maccullochella
- Species: M. ikei

Binomial name
- Maccullochella ikei Rowland, 1986

= Eastern freshwater cod =

Species of fish

The eastern freshwater cod (Maccullochella ikei), also known as the eastern cod or Clarence River cod, is a large predatory freshwater fish of the genus Maccullochella and the family Percichthyidae, that occur in the coastal Clarence River system of north-eastern New South Wales. Eastern freshwater cod are closely related to the Murray cod of the Murray-Darling River system, and are considered an icon of the Clarence River system.

A long-lived, slow-growing species, eastern freshwater cod are threatened by poaching [i.e. illegal take], habitat degradation, catastrophic natural events such as bushfires, and inbreeding from low genetic diversity. They are currently classified as endangered and protected by law from human exploitation of any kind.

== Range ==
Eastern freshwater cod are native to the Clarence River system in northern New South Wales, Australia. The Clarence River system is an extensive East Coast drainage with many tributaries of differing size. By Australian standards, the Clarence River and its major tributaries the Mann and Nymboida Rivers are extremely large rivers with extremely large flow volumes.

Eastern freshwater cod originally occurred in great abundance throughout the system, to significant altitudes. Though reportedly M. ikei were never found above the large falls in some headwaters, the uppermost reaches of many tributaries feature in this species' range.

The indigenous cod population of the Richmond River system (Richmond River cod), now extinct, are believed to have been a sub-population of eastern freshwater cod. The Richmond River has been restocked with fingerlings (juvenile fish) produced from Clarence River cod, but no evidence of breeding has been found.

A closely related freshwater cod was historically common in the Brisbane River system, however the exact taxonomic status of the now-extinct Brisbane River cod is not known.

== Appearance and size ==
The eastern freshwater cod is a small to medium-sized grouper-like fish with a deep, elongated body that is round in cross section and a broad, scooped head, and a large mouth lined with pads of very small needle-like teeth. The jaws are equal, or the lower jaw may protrude slightly. The eyes are slightly larger and more prominent than in Murray cod.

The spiny dorsal fin is moderate in height and is partially separated by a notch from the high, rounded soft dorsal fin. Soft dorsal, anal, and caudal (tail) fins are all large and rounded, and are dusky grey or black with distinct white edges. The large, rounded pectoral fins are usually similar in colour to flanks. The pelvic fins are large and angular, set forward of the pectoral fins, and are usually a translucent greyish-white colour, tending toward opacity in large fish. The leading greyish-white coloured rays on the pelvic fins split into two trailing filaments. These filaments are significantly longer than in Murray cod.

Eastern freshwater cod are vary from cream or greyish-white to yellow on their ventral ("belly") surfaces. Their backs and flanks are usually an intense yellow or gold in colour, overlain with a dense pattern of black to very dark green mottling. The effect is a marbled appearance sometimes reminiscent of a leopard's markings. Colouration does vary considerably however and eastern freshwater cod from dark, heavily shaded habitats can be very dark or almost black in colour.

Eastern freshwater cod were historically recorded reaching sizes well over 1 metre in length and up to 48 kg in weight, but today are commonly less than 60 cm in length and less than 5 kg in weight. Large fish are rare today.

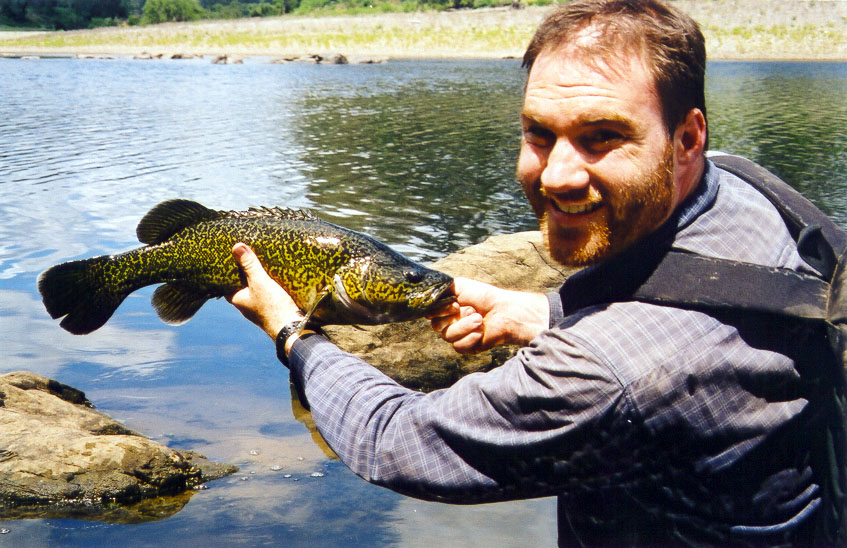
A small eastern freshwater cod that took a lure intended for Australian bass

== Origins ==
Eastern freshwater cod are a species of cod that is descended from the Murray cod, Maccullochella peelii, present in tributaries of the Murray-Darling Basin on the western side of the Great Dividing Range. Murray cod entered an east coast river system, likely the Clarence, via a natural event somewhere between 0.62 and 1.62 million years ago (mean estimate 1.1 mya), as estimated by DNA divergence rates. Subsequent isolation from Murray cod populations, the founder effect, genetic drift, and natural selection lead to allopatric speciation.

In addition to eastern freshwater cod of the Clarence River system, cod are/were to be found in several other coastal river systems. In total, at the time of European settlement of the Australia in the 18th century, naturally occurring cod were present and abundant in four East Coast river systems:

- Clarence River system, northern New South Wales (eastern freshwater cod, Maccullochella ikei)
- Richmond River system, northern New South Wales (Richmond River cod, Maccullochella ikei)
- Brisbane River system and its Logan-Albert and Coomera River sub-systems, southern Queensland (Brisbane River cod, Maccullochella sp.)
- Mary River system, central Queensland (Mary River cod, Maccullochella mariensis)

Several genetic studies have found that eastern freshwater cod, in the southernmost of these four rivers, and Mary River cod, in the northernmost of these four rivers, are more closely related to each other than to Murray cod. This suggests that Murray cod only managed to cross into east coast river systems once. It is not clear which of the four river systems was the original entry point, but geomorphological evidence suggests the headwaters of the Clarence River. The mechanism by which Murray cod crossed the Great Dividing Range are considered to be either river capture, where the headwaters of an easterly-flowing coastal river cuts back (in the erosional sense) and intercepts and "captures" the headwaters (and fish fauna) of a previously westerly flowing stream, or a "wet divide", where extreme flooding or a very wet climatic phase created swamps in a topographic low point that effectively connected the headwaters of western flowing and eastern flowing streams.

After crossing the Great Dividing Range, drops in sea level during glacial periods (ice ages) and/or "lateral" river capture events linked these four coastal rivers at times, allowing freshwater cod to gain access to these rivers and colonise them. The mean estimate for genetic separation of Mary River cod and eastern freshwater cod is only 300,000 years.

DNA analysis reveals eastern freshwater cod of the Clarence River system went through one or more population bottlenecks before European settlement. This was likely due to a sequence of catastrophic drought, whole-of-catchment-scale bushfire and severe, widespread ash-induced fish kills, similar to those which occurred in 1936 (see below). Eastern freshwater cod numbers recovered from these pre-European bottleneck events, and the fish were abundant by the time of European settlement, but the species appears to have lost some genetic diversity. Further, very significant losses in genetic diversity occurred when European settlers caused catastrophic declines, and to a lesser extent by recent stockings of hatchery fish with low genetic diversity.

== Habitat and diet ==
Eastern freshwater cod are found in clear-flowing rivers and streams with rocky beds and deep holes within the Clarence River system, to significant altitudes. They inhabit all sizes of rivers and streams. Eastern freshwater cod are territorial and aggressive. The bulk of their diet is based on crustaceans (the large, clawed Macrobrachium shrimp and the small, clawless Paratya shrimp) and other fish, but they are powerful opportunistic predators and are also known to take insects (e.g. cicadas), frogs, snakes, lizards, birds, and small mammals.

== Lifecycle ==
Growth is highly variable in eastern freshwater cod, but overall is slower than in Murray cod. The oldest specimen yet aged was only 14 years old, but this likely reflects limited sampling and many decades of overfishing and poaching that have led to the loss of most large individuals. There is little doubt the species has the potential to reach or exceed the maximum age recorded in Murray cod (48 years).

Eastern freshwater cod are sexually mature at 4 to 5 years old, and at sizes as small as 700 g, the latter being markedly smaller than in Murray cod. This appears to be an evolved adaptation to the rocky, low-nutrient, and often quite small waterways in which they found. The trout cod, a Maccullochella cod, once found in comparable habitats in the Murray-Darling system, displays a similar trait.

Eastern freshwater cod spawn in early spring when water temperatures exceed 16 °C, using rock structures as sites for the adhesive eggs. Most other aspects of their spawning, including the guarding of eggs and newly hatched larvae by the male fish, are similar to Murray cod. The breeding season is 8–10 weeks long. Males clean and protect nesting sites until females enter and a complex spawning ritual is performed. The males then protect the eggs until hatching, and continue to defend the larvae for 12–14 days until they disperse.

While specifically targeting this protected species is prohibited, it is also important for anglers to avoid any accidental captures of eastern freshwater cod in winter when they are developing their roe (eggs), or in early spring when spawning is occurring, as research indicates this results in resorbed roe or abandoned nests, respectively, and a failed spawning effort. (The eggs in abandoned nests are rapidly consumed by shrimp, turtles and small fish.) A total fishing closure is in effect on the Mann and Nymboida Rivers and their tributaries between August and October each year specifically to prevent this.

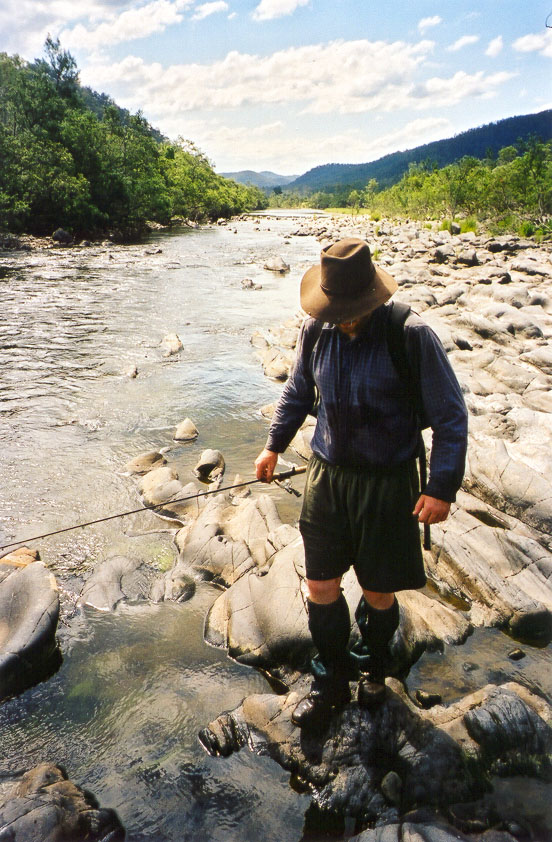
Eastern freshwater cod habitat: Eastern freshwater cod often share such habitats with Australian bass.

== Conservation status ==
Following heavy declines in numbers and distribution, the eastern freshwater cod is currently classified as endangered by the IUCN.

=== Population decline ===
Early records show that eastern freshwater cod were extremely abundant in the all parts of the Clarence River system at the time of European settlement. They were so abundant that they were caught "on demand" for diners at one riverside hotel, and were reportedly even used as pig feed, as were the related Mary River Cod.

A number of factors have led to the decline of eastern freshwater cod. One factor was decades of pronounced overfishing, including with lines, nets, explosives, and spears. As a very slow-growing top predator with low fecundity, eastern freshwater cod are even more vulnerable to overfishing than Murray cod.

Another factor were several huge bushfires (on the scale of the entire catchment) in the 1920s and 1930s, but particularly a bushfire in late 1936. These caused severe and widespread ash-induced fish kills in the first rainfall events post-fire.

Habitat degradation and siltation brought on by poor farming practices (such as clearing riverbank vegetation and allowing stock to trample river banks) has also destroyed many eastern freshwater cod habitats. Some of these practices leading to land degradation are still continuing.

=== Mining pollution ===
Tin mining and dredging/sluicing for tin caused serious and widespread pollution of the Clarence River system in the late 19th century/early 20th century, with dozens of newspaper reports suggesting it reached its worst extent in the mid-late 1930s. These reports detail numerous pollution events characterised by milk-coloured stinking water, stained river rocks, cattle refusing to drink river water, and hundreds or thousands of dead fish per event. An article in The Daily Examiner from 11 October 1935 states that pollution was "causing alarm amongst fishermen, stockowners and people interested in preserving the Clarence and its tributaries as tourist attractions", and that farmers had trouble in getting their stock to drink from the polluted water. It includes statements from fishermen who describe fish "dead in thousands".

This tin mining pollution caused many severe fish kills and was probably a key factor in the extirpation of eastern freshwater cod from large tracts of the Clarence River system in the 1930s.

=== Conservation actions ===
The above factors, which have in the past led to the extinction of the Richmond River cod and the Brisbane River cod and the endangerment of the Mary River cod, have reduced the eastern freshwater cod from an abundant fish found in all parts of the Clarence River system to an endangered fish absent from most parts of it. It survives only in limited, remote parts of the Nymboida/Mann and Guy Fawkes/Sara sections. The latter population is now at risk of severe inbreeding depression and is in need of "genetic rescue" via translocation of genetically differing fish from the former, more diverse population. Currently there are no management plans to undertake such translocations.

Eastern freshwater cod were recognised as a potentially separate and endangered species of cod in 1984, and were declared a protected species in that year. Subsequent research confirmed this finding. While a high level of poaching is still taking place, legal protection has played a large role in finally allowing the species to commence a limited natural recovery.

A restocking programme was undertaken by the government of New South Wales in 1984-1989, but was then closed and contracted to a private operation, which produced and stocked fingerlings until the late 1990s. The eastern freshwater cod stocking programme was suspended after genetic research indicated the fingerlings being produced had lower than desirable levels of genetic diversity. No eastern freshwater cod are currently being bred or stocked.

Concern has been expressed over the future of eastern freshwater cod stocks in the Clarence River system after the NSW Fisheries department allowed a stocking of Australian bass fingerlings from a completely different bioregion to proceed. The fingerlings were contaminated with and introduced the banded grunter (Amniataba percoides), an aggressive small native fish, to the lower reaches of the river. It is feared that banded grunter may yet invade the main freshwater reaches of the Clarence River system, with possibly devastating impacts on eastern freshwater cod.

== Species description and etymology ==
The Eastern freshwater cod was first formally described in 1986 by Stuart J. Rowland with the type locality given as the confluence of the Nymboida River with the Mann River in New South Wales. Rowland gave it the specific name ikei in honour of his father Isaac "Ike" Morgan Rowland who was an angler and who enjoyed catching freshwater cod.
