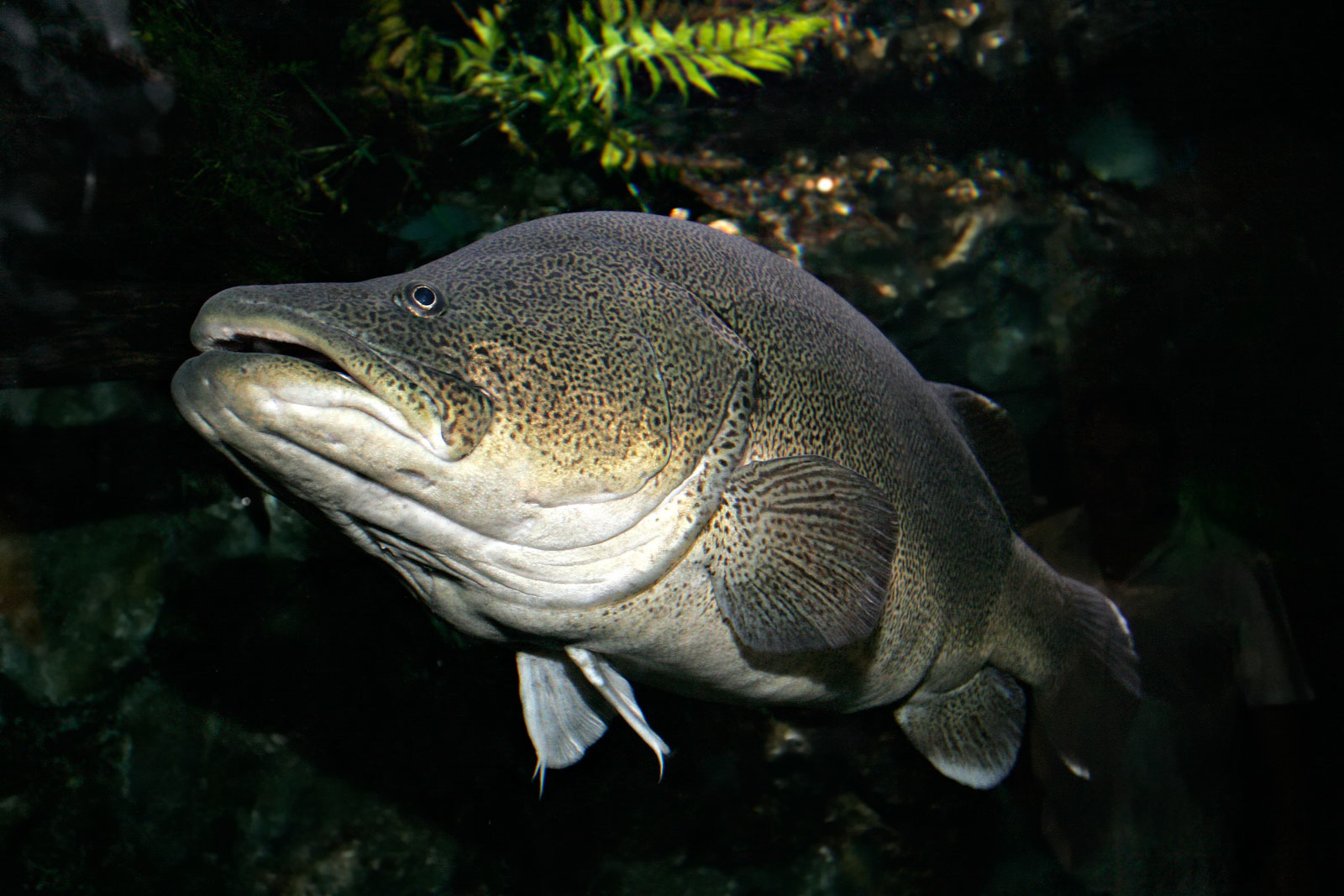
- Murray cod, Maccullochella peelii peelii

Scientific classification
- Kingdom: Animalia
- Phylum: Chordata
- Class: Actinopterygii
- Order: Centrarchiformes
- Family: Percichthyidae
- Genus: Maccullochella; Whitley, 1929

Type species
- Grystes macquariensis G. Cuvier, 1829

Synonyms
- Oligorus Günther, 1859 (pre-occupied); Homodemus De Vis, 1884 (pre-occupied)

= Maccullochella =

Maccullochella Temporal range: Middle Miocene to present

Genus of ray-finned fishes

Maccullochella is a genus of large Australian predatory freshwater fish within the family Percichthyidae. The genus Maccullochella was named after an early Australian fish researcher with the surname McCulloch.

The Maccullochella species are called 'cod' in the vernacular.

At the time of European settlement of Australia, members of the genus Maccullochella dominated the Murray-Darling river system (Murray cod, M. peelii, and trout cod, M. macquariensis) and 4 East Coast river systems (eastern freshwater cod, M. ikei, of the Clarence and Richmond Rivers, Brisbane River cod, Maccullochella sp., and Mary River cod, M. mariensis).

As large, long-lived, top-order predators with delayed sexual maturity and relatively low fecundity (fertility) Maccullochella species are extremely vulnerable to overfishing, siltation and other forms of habitat degradation, and river regulation by dams and weirs that alter river environments and negatively affect spawning and recruitment (survival) of young fish.

The Maccullochella species have not fared well since European settlement. All are endangered or critically endangered except for Murray cod, which are considered 'Threatened' and 'Vulnerable' under national and state legislation. There are grave concerns over the future of wild Murray cod now, just as much as there is for all the Maccullochella species.

== Species ==
There are currently four recognized species in this genus:

- Maccullochella ikei Rowland, 1986 (Eastern freshwater cod)
- Maccullochella macquariensis (G. Cuvier, 1829) (Trout cod)
- Maccullochella mariensis Rowland, 1993 (Mary River cod)
- Maccullochella peelii (T. L. Mitchell, 1838) (Murray cod)

Well-preserved fossil remains of small-sized Maccullochella (originally assigned to M. macquariensis, but this was prior to the splitting of the genus) have been recovered from the Middle Miocene-aged diatomite deposits of the Chalk Mountain Formation near Coonabarabran.

== Etymology ==
The generic name honours the Australian zoologist Allan Riverstone McCulloch (1885-1925) who Whitley succeeded as the Curator of Fishes at the Australian Museum.
