= Mary River cod =

Mary River Cod

Conservation status
- Endangered (IUCN 3.1)

Scientific classification
- Kingdom: Animalia
- Phylum: Chordata
- Class: Actinopterygii
- Order: Centrarchiformes
- Family: Percichthyidae
- Genus: Maccullochella
- Species: M. mariensis

Binomial name
- Maccullochella mariensis Rowland, 1993

Synonyms
- Maccullochella peelii mariensis Rowland, 1993

Species of fish

The Mary River cod (Maccullochella mariensis) is a species of temperate perch native to the coastal Mary River system of southern Queensland, Australia. Mary River cod are one of Australia's most endangered freshwater fishes and are notable for being the most northerly of the four Maccullochella cods found or once found in coastal river systems of eastern Australia.

The endangered status of the fish was one of the reasons that the Traveston Crossing Dam was not able to be built.

The species is very territorial, staying in the same spot for 98% of the time, leaving only to feed and breed.

== Description ==
The Mary River cod is a large fish recorded up to almost 40 kg and 120 cm in the early years of European settlement, but now are mostly less than 5 kg and 70 cm.

Very similar in appearance to Murray cod and eastern freshwater cod, they are striking looking, golden-yellow to dark green or brown, deep-bodied fish with dark green to black mottling. Curiously, Mary River cod have a slightly shorter, thicker caudal peduncle (tail wrist) than the other cod species.

== Conservation ==
The Mary River Cod is listed as Endangered under the Environment Protection and Biodiversity Conservation Act 1999 and is estimated to only occur in less than 30% of its historic range.

Incredibly abundant at the time of the first European settlement, Mary River Cod were grossly overfished with nets, lines, and explosives by the early European settlers and, as with other Maccullochella cods, were even used as pig feed. This overfishing, combined with the massive siltation of their habitats by land clearing, destruction of riparian vegetation and cattle trampling river banks, and dams and weirs blocking migration, rapidly caught up with this large, slow-growing, long-lived Maccullochella cod species, as it has with all its close relatives. It is estimated that just 600 individuals survived in the wild in the 1980s.

Outside of a few stocked Queensland impoundments- upstream of the walls of Cressbrook, Hinze, Maroon, Moogerah, North Pine, Somerset, and Wivenhoe Dams and lakes Dyer (Bill Gunn dam) and Clarendon- the fish is a no-take species, and any caught should be carefully released. A strict bag limit of one fish with a minimum size of 50 cm applies to the stocked impoundments.

== Classification ==
Taxonomically, the Mary River cod was originally described as a subspecies of the Murray cod, Maccullochella peelii based on studies of muscle proteins and enzymes.

As of 2010, after studies of mitochondrial and nuclear DNA, the Mary River cod has been raised to full species status. This research reveals the Mary River cod's closest relative is the eastern freshwater cod (Maccullochella ikei) of the Clarence River system.
