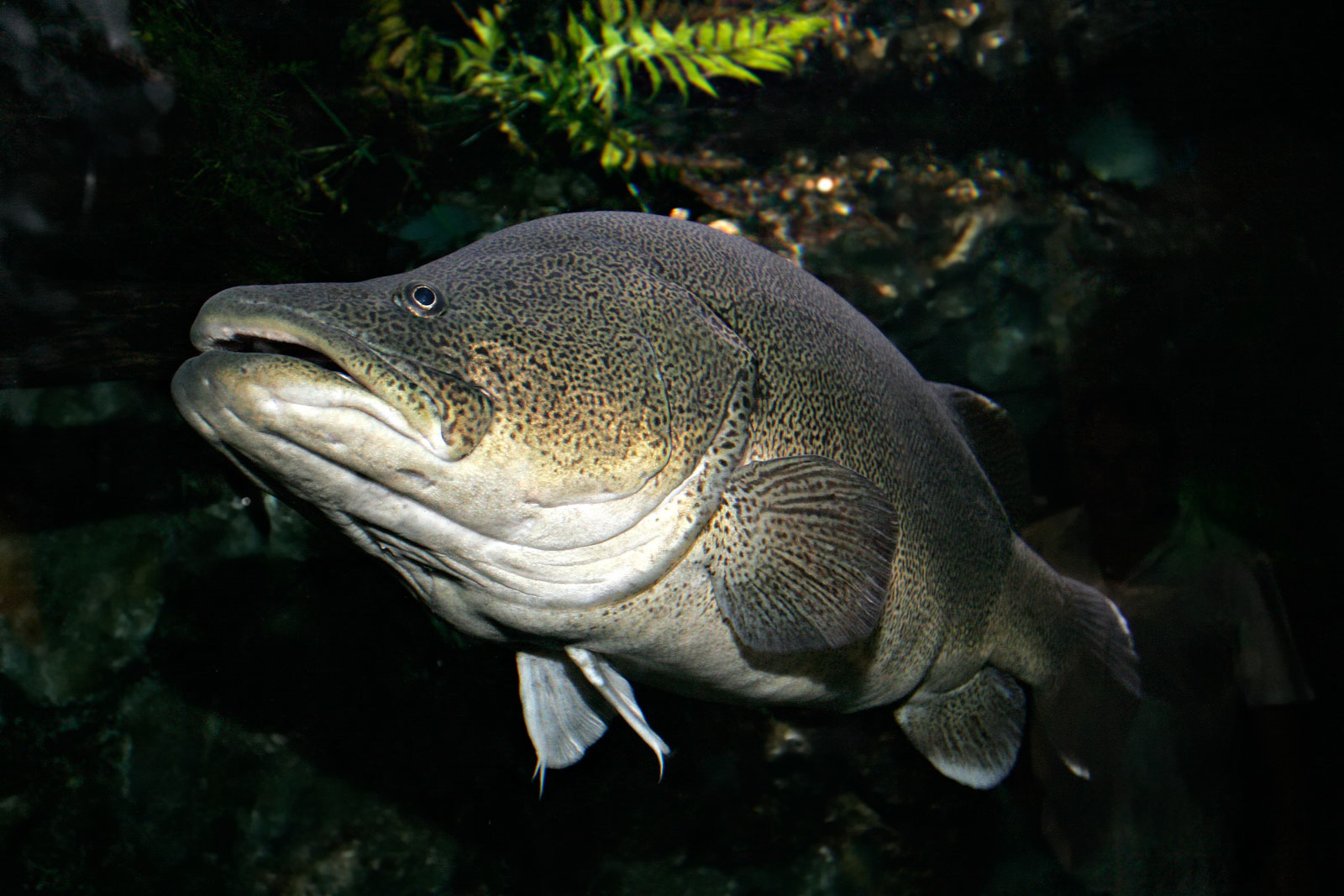
- At Sea Life Melbourne Aquarium, Melbourne

Conservation status
- Vulnerable (EPBC Act)

- Least Concern (IUCN 3.1)

Scientific classification
- Kingdom: Animalia
- Phylum: Chordata
- Class: Actinopterygii
- Division: Teleostei
- Order: Centrarchiformes
- Family: Percichthyidae
- Genus: Maccullochella
- Species: M. peelii

Binomial name
- Maccullochella peelii (T. L. Mitchell, 1838)

Synonyms
- Acerina peelii T. L. Mitchell, 1838; Maccullochella peelii peelii (T. L. Mitchell, 1838)

= Murray cod =

Australian predatory freshwater fish

The Murray cod (Maccullochella peelii) is a large Australian predatory freshwater fish of the genus Maccullochella in the family Percichthyidae. Although the species is called a cod in the vernacular, it is not related to the Northern Hemisphere marine cod (Gadus) species. The Murray cod is an important part of Australia's vertebrate wildlife—as an apex predator in the Murray-Darling River system—and also significant in Australia's human culture. The Murray cod is the largest exclusively freshwater fish in Australia, and one of the largest in the world. Other common names for Murray cod include cod, greenfish, goodoo, Mary River cod, Murray perch, ponde, pondi and Queensland freshwater cod.

The scientific name of Murray cod derives from an early Australian fish researcher Allan Riverstone McCulloch and the river from which the explorer Major Mitchell first scientifically described the species, the Peel River. This was for a number of years changed to M. peelii peelii to differentiate Murray cod from Mary River cod, which were designated as a subspecies of Murray cod. However, as of 2010, Mary River cod have been raised to full species status (M. mariensis), thus Murray cod have reverted simply to M. peelii.

Murray cod populations have declined severely since European colonisation of Australia due to a number of causes, including severe overfishing, river regulation, and habitat degradation and are now a listed threatened species. However, they once inhabited almost the entire Murray-Darling basin, Australia's largest river system, in very great numbers.

A long-lived fish, adult Murray cod are carnivorous and eat crustaceans (shrimp, yabbies, crays), fish and freshwater mussels. The species exhibits a high degree of parental care for their eggs, which are spawned in the spring and are generally laid in hollow logs or on other hard surfaces. Murray cod are a popular angling target and aquaculture species. Often available through the aquarium trade, they are also a popular aquarium species in Australia.

== Description ==
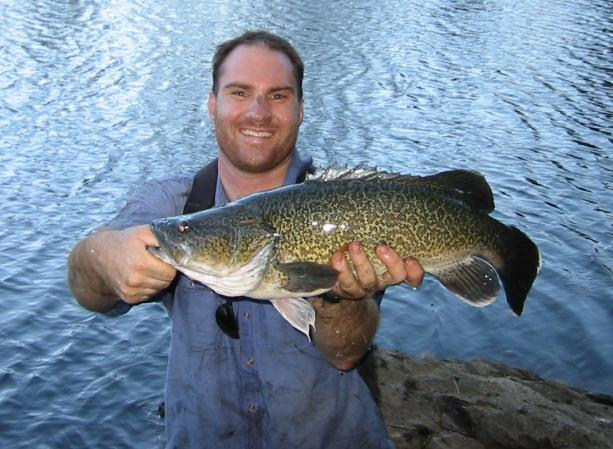
A Murray cod, displaying characteristic mottled green colouration

The Murray cod is a large grouper-like fish with a deep, elongated body that is round in cross section. It has a broad, scooped head, and a large mouth lined with pads of very small, needle-like teeth. The jaws of the Murray cod are equal, or the lower jaw protrudes slightly.

The spiny dorsal fin of Murray cod is moderate to low in height and is partially separated by a notch from the high, rounded soft dorsal fin. Soft dorsal, anal, and caudal (tail) fins are all large and rounded, and are dusky grey or black with distinct white edges. The large, rounded pectoral fins are usually similar in colour to the flanks. The pelvic fins are large, angular, and set forward of the pectoral fins. The leading white-coloured rays on the pelvic fins split into two trailing white filaments, while the pelvic fins themselves are usually a translucent white or cream, tending toward opacity in large fish.

Murray cod are white to cream on their ventral (belly) surfaces. Their backs and flanks are usually yellowish-green to green, overlain with heavy darker green, but occasionally brown or black, mottling. The effect is a marbled appearance sometimes reminiscent of a leopard's markings. Colouration is related to water clarity; colouration is intense in fish from clear water habitats. Small to medium-sized Murray cod from clear-water habitats often have striking and very distinct colouration. Very large fish tend towards a speckled grey-green colouration.

=== Size ===
Murray cod are large fish, with adult fish regularly reaching 80–100 cm (31–39 in) in length. Murray cod are capable of growing well over 1 m (3.3 ft) in length and the largest on record was over 1.8 m (5.9 ft) and about 113 kg (249 lb) in weight. Large breeding fish are rare in most wild populations today due to overfishing.

== Related species ==
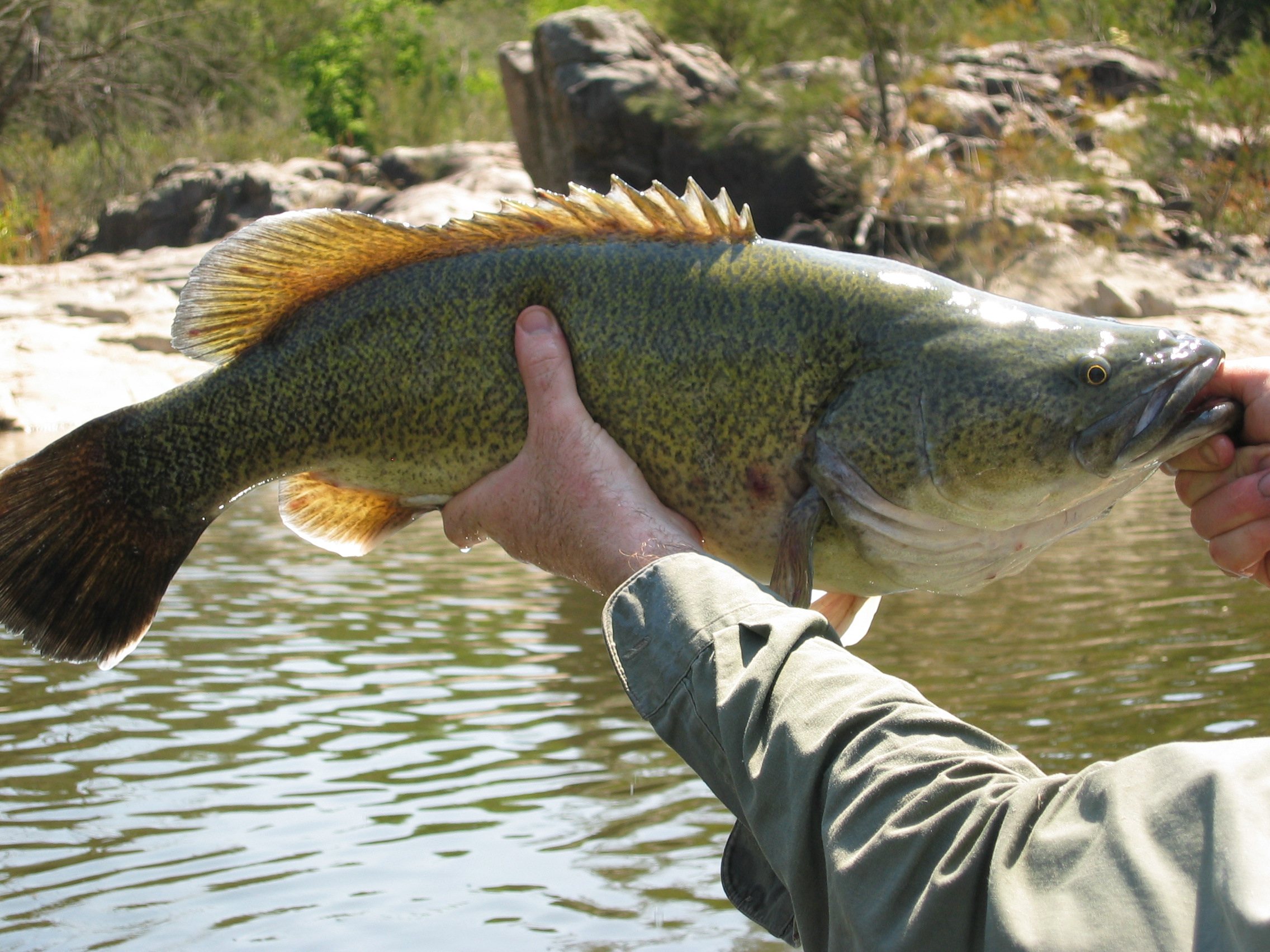
Murray cod push significant distances into upland river habitats.

Murray cod continue a pattern present in Murray-Darling native fish genera of speciation into lowland and specialist upland species: Murray cod are the primarily lowland species and the endangered trout cod are the specialist upland species. The pattern is slightly blurred in the cod species because, being adaptable and successful fish, Murray cod push significant distances into upland habitats, while the now endangered trout cod stray (or did stray, before their decline) well down the upland/lowland transition zone, which can be extensive in Murray-Darling Rivers. Nevertheless, the basic pattern of speciation into a primarily lowland species and a specialist upland species is present.

Murray cod, like a number of other Murray-Darling native fish species, have also managed to cross the Great Dividing Range at least once through natural river capture events, leading to several species and subspecies of coastal cod. The best known are eastern freshwater cod of the Clarence River system in northern New South Wales, and Mary River cod of the Mary River system in south eastern Queensland, both of which are endangered, but survive today. Coastal cod were also found in the Richmond River system in northern New South Wales and the Brisbane River system in southern Queensland, but are now extinct.

== Taxonomy ==
In Mitchell's original description, he classified the fish as "Family, Percidae; Genus, Acerina; Subgenus, Gristes, Cuv. or Growler; Species, Gristes peelii mihi, or Cod-perch", observing "This fish may be identical with the fish described by MM. Cuvier and Valenciennes Volume 3 page 45 under the name of Gristes macquariensis: but it differs from their description…".

In the 1800s and early 1900s, commercial fishermen, recreational fishermen, riverside residents, and some fisheries scientists (e.g. Anderson, Stead, Langtry) distinctly recognised two species of cod in the southern Murray-Darling basin, Murray cod and trout cod or "blue nose cod". Taxonomically however, confusion abounded. Ignoring glaring differences in size at sexual maturity, and via some rather unscientific reasoning, some prominent fisheries scientists (e.g. Whitley) insisted on recognising only one species of cod—the Murray cod (then named Maccullochella macquariensis, after an early Australian fish researcher with the surname McCulloch and the Macquarie River in New South Wales where the holotype was captured). Then, as trout cod declined into near extinction over the 1900s, the distinction between the two species was further eroded and finally questioned. In the 1970s, early genetic techniques confirmed that trout cod were a separate species and further showed that the original "Murray cod" specimen was in fact a trout cod. Following the rules of scientific classification, the name M. macquariensis remained with the original specimen, now known to be the trout cod, and a new name, M. peelii, for the Peel River where the new holotype was captured, was coined for the Murray cod. Subsequently, two further cod were identified as separate species, the eastern freshwater cod (M. ikei) and the Mary River cod (M. mariensis).

== Range ==
The Murray cod is named after the Murray River, part of the Murray-Darling basin in eastern Australia, Australia's largest and most important river system, draining around 14% of the continent. The Murray cod's natural range encompasses virtually the whole Murray-Darling basin, particularly the lowland areas, and extending well into upland areas — to about 700 m (2,300 ft) elevation in the southern half of the basin and to about 1,000 m (3,300 ft) in the northern half of the basin.

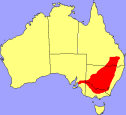
Distribution of Murray cod

Consequently, Murray cod inhabit a remarkably wide variety of habitats, from cool, clear, fast-flowing streams with riffle-and-pool structure and rocky substrates in upland areas to large, slow flowing, meandering rivers in the extensive alluvial lowland reaches of the Murray-Darling basin. Murray cod have died out in many of their upland habitats, particularly in the southern Murray-Darling basin, due to a combination of overfishing, siltation, dams and weirs blocking migration, pollution from arsenic-based sheep-dips, mining, and in some cases, introduced trout stockings, which causes competition between juvenile Murray cod and introduced trout species. Murray cod have also been introduced into other drainage basins, such as the Cooper Basin in Queensland.

== Age ==
Murray cod are very long-lived, which is characteristic of many freshwater native fish in Australia. Longevity is a survival strategy in variable Australian environment to ensure that most adults participate in at least one exceptional spawning and recruitment event, which are often linked to unusually wet La Niña years and may only occur every one or two decades. Murray cod are the most long-lived freshwater native fish in Australia. The oldest Murray cod aged yet was 48 years of age, and the even larger specimens of years past leave little doubt that the species can reach considerably greater ages, of 70 years or more.

== Diet ==
The Murray cod is the apex aquatic predator in the rivers of the Murray-Darling basin, and will eat almost anything smaller than itself, including finned fishes such as smaller Murray cod, golden perch, silver perch, bony bream, eel-tailed catfish, western carp gudgeon, and Australian smelt and introduced fish such as carp, goldfish, and redfin (English perch), as well as crustaceans such as yabbies, freshwater shrimp, and Murray crayfish. Fish are eaten when abundant by mature Murray cod in lowland river and impoundment habitats but crustaceans tend to dominate the diet under natural conditions, and freshwater mussels were commonly eaten in the past. Murray cod have also been known to eat ducks, cormorants, freshwater turtles, water dragons, snakes, mice, and frogs. The observations of the recreational fishermen fishing for Murray cod with surface lures at night reveal that the popular description of Murray cod as a demersal ambush predator is only partially correct. While this behaviour is typical during the day, at night, Murray cod are active pelagic predators, venturing into shallow waters and frequently taking prey from the surface.

== Reproduction ==
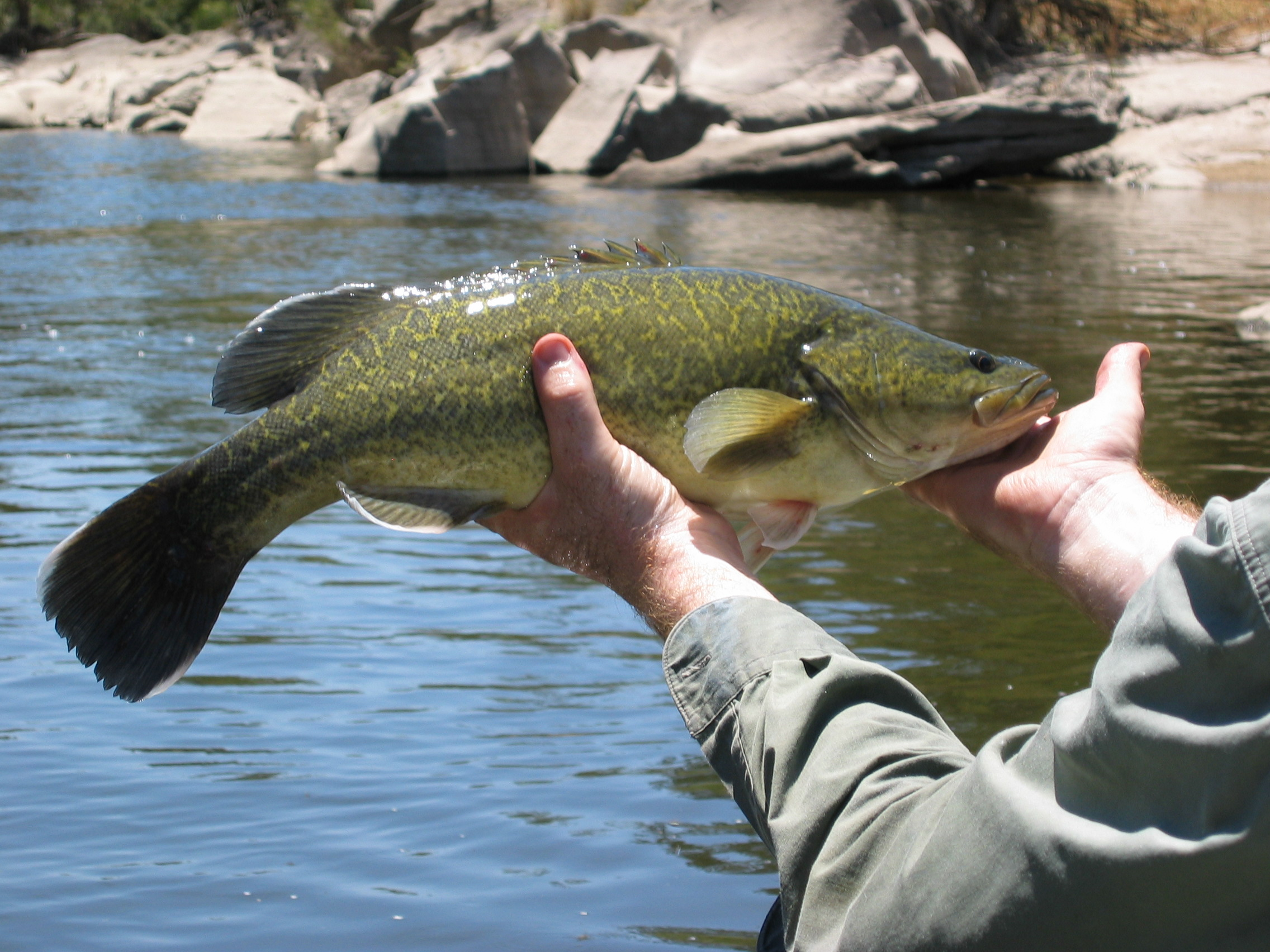
A small Murray cod from a run in an upland river

Murray cod reach sexual maturity between four and six years of age, generally five years. Sexual maturity in Murray cod is dependent on age. Therefore, roughly 70% of wild river Murray cod, with their slower growth rate, have reached sexual maturity by 50 cm (20 in) in length. Wild Murray cod in impoundments like Lake Mulwala, with their faster growth rates, do not reach sexual maturity until they are well over 60 cm (2.0 ft) in length. These data strongly indicate the 50-cm (20-in) size limit for Murray cod is inadequate and should be increased substantially to allow for a greater chance of reproduction before capture.

Large female Murray cod in the 15– to 35-kg (35– to 80-lb) range are the most important breeders because they produce the most eggs and for other reasons; large females in most fish species are also important because they produce larger larvae with larger yolk sacs, and are also more experienced breeders that display optimal breeding behaviours. Such large females may also have valuable, successful genes to pass on. All of these factors mean the spawnings of large female fish have far higher larval survival rates and make far greater reproductive contributions than the spawnings of small female fish. Not surprisingly, there is no truth to claim made by some recreational fishers that "large Murray cod don't breed".

Female Murray cod, upon first reaching sexual maturity, have egg counts of no more than 10,000. Very large female Murray cod can have egg counts as high as 80,000–90,000, although a recent, very large 33-kg specimen yielded an egg count of 110,000 viable eggs. Egg counts in female Murray cod of all sizes are relatively low compared to many fish species.

Murray cod spawn in spring, cued by rising water temperatures and increasing photoperiod (daylight length). Initially, fish biologists working with Murray cod considered spring floods and temperatures of 20–21 °C (68–70 °F) to be necessary and that spring flooding is critical for successful recruitment (i.e. survival to juvenile stages) of young cod by providing an influx of pelagic zooplankton and early life-stage macroinvertebrates off the flood plain into the main river channel for first feeding, but more recent research has shown Murray cod breed annually, with or without spring floods, and at temperatures as low as 15 °C (59 °F). Additionally, recent research has shown abundant epibenthic/epiphytic (bottom dwelling/edge clinging) prey in unflooded lowland rivers, traits in Murray cod larvae that should allow survival in a variety of challenging conditions, and a significant proportion of Murray cod larvae feeding successfully in unflooded rivers.

Latest research has also shown that Murray cod in fact live their entire lifecycle within the main channel of the stream. Earlier ideas that Murray cod spawn on floodplains, or the larvae feed on floodplains, are incorrect. Murray cod breed in the main river channel or, in times of spring flood, the inundated upper portion of the main channel and tributary channels, but not on floodplains. Murray cod larvae feed within the main river channel or, in times of spring flood, on the inundated upper portion of the main channel and the channel/floodplain boundary, but not on the floodplain.

Spawning is sometimes preceded by upstream or downstream movements. Radio-tracked Murray cod in the Murray River have moved up to 120 km (75 mi) upstream to spawn, before returning to exactly the same snag from where they departed, an unusual homing behaviour in a freshwater fish. Decades of observations by recreational and commercial fishermen suggest such spring spawning movements are common across the Murray cod's geographical range. Spawning is initiated by pairing up and courtship rituals. During the courtship ritual a spawning site is selected and cleaned — hard surfaces such as rocks in upland rivers and impoundments, and logs and occasionally clay banks in lowland rivers, at a depth of 2–3 metres (6.6–9.8 ft), are selected. The female lays the large adhesive eggs as a mat on the spawning surface, which the male fertilises. The female then leaves the spawning site. The male remains to guard the eggs during incubation, which takes six to 10 days (depending on water temperature), and to guard the hatched larvae for a further week or so until they disperse. Larvae disperse from the nest site by drifting in river currents at night, and continue this behaviour around four to seven days. During this dispersal process, larvae simultaneously absorb the remainder of their yolk sac and begin to feed on small, early life-stage macroinvertebrates and epibenthic/epiphytic (bottom dwelling/edge clinging) microinvertebrates. It may be that Murray cod are the first freshwater fish identified as having long-term pair-bonding in its repertoire of mating strategies in the wild.

The relationship between river flows and Murray cod recruitment are more complex than first thought, and in less regulated rivers, Murray cod may be able to recruit under a range of conditions including stable low flows. (Significant recruitment of Murray cod in low-flow conditions in less regulated lowland rivers has now been proven.) This information also suggests that nonriver-regulation-related causes of degradation are playing a larger role in the survival and recruitment of Murray cod larvae than first thought; competition from extremely large numbers of invasive carp larvae are negatively affecting the survival and recruitment of Murray cod larvae to a much greater degree than first thought; and that decades of overfishing is playing a far larger role in the current state of Murray cod stocks, through depletion of spawning adults, than first thought.

These findings do not mean that river regulation and water extraction have not had adverse effects on fish stocks. Rather, river regulation has been a major factor in the decline of Murray cod and other native fish. Thermal pollution is also a major problem, evidence indicates strong Murray cod recruitment events (which may be important for sustaining Murray cod populations over the long term) can result from spring flooding, and the health of Australian lowland river ecosystems generally rely on periodic spring flooding. Also, due to the regulation of most of the rivers in the Murray-Darling River system, mainly for irrigation purposes, only exceptional spring floods manage to "break free". The long-term viability of wild Murray cod, other native fish species and river ecosystems, in the face of this fact, are of great concern.

== Conservation ==
=== History ===
Murray cod were originally the most common large native fish in the Murray-Darling basin. Contrary to some fishery department literature, the first serious declines in Murray cod were caused by overfishing. In the latter half of the 1800s and the early 1900s, Murray cod were caught in large numbers by both commercial and recreational fishermen. For example, one commercial fishing operation commenced on the Murray River near Echuca in 1855, targeting Murray cod over hundreds of kilometres of river, and yet within eight years, grave concerns over the sustainability of this operation, and complaints about the near-absence of Murray cod in their heavily fished grounds, were being raised in the main state newspaper, The Argus. Yet fishing effort continued to increase in the region, so in the late 1880s and early 1890s, between 40,000 and 150,000 kg of mostly Murray cod (between 7,500 and 27,000 fish, at an average weight of 5.5 kg) were caught near Echuca. Similarly, in 1883, more than 147,000 kg of Murray cod were sent to Melbourne from just one river town (Moama). By the 1920s Murray cod had been overfished to the point where large-scale commercial fishing operations were no longer feasible. Recreational fishermen took similarly excessive hauls during this era, using rods and reels, handlines, setlines, drum nets, gill nets, and even explosives, with hauls often either wasted or illegally sold. Perhaps this extreme overfishing and its impacts of wild Murray cod stocks is best summarised by a short article in the Register News (a South Australian newspaper) in 1929:

In [the last] 29 years 26,214,502 lbs (nearly 11,703 tons) [11,915,683 kg] of Murray cod has been eaten by the people of Melbourne. The Superintendent of Markets (Mr G. B. Minns) included these figures in a statement he made today pointing out that the supply was declining. In 1918, the peak year, 2,229,024 lb [1,011,068 kg] was received at the market, but since 1921, when 1,101,520 lb [499,640 kg] was sent to Melbourne, supply has decreased. Last year [1928] it was only 551,040 lb [249,950 kg].

Twenty years later, the aquatic ecologist J. O. Langtry criticised the heavy fishing pressure, in the form of both uncontrolled small-scale commercial fishing and rampant illegal fishing, which he found in all reaches of the Murray River he investigated 1949–1950.

A thorough reading of historical newspaper articles and historical government reports reveals that the history of wild Murray cod between the mid-1800s and the mid-1900s was one of citizen agitation, government inaction, and ongoing stock decline. For decades, riverside residents, commercial fishermen, recreational fishermen, local fisheries inspectors, fish retailers, and others agitated in newspapers and other fora about the declining Murray cod stocks, to be met in turn either with government denials, or conversely, with various ineffective inquiries into Murray cod stocks and fisheries, and various ineffective control measures. Debate about excessive fishing pressure, number of fishermen, number of nets, net mesh size, bag limits, minimum size limits and take of small cod, closed seasons and the taking of spawning cod full of eggs during spring, and other sundry issues, continued without resolution. Fishing regulations were either not amended, or amended and largely unenforced and completely ignored. Heavy commercial, recreational and illegal fishing pressure continued. The end result was a Murray cod population, initially abundant, continually fished down until in the early to mid 20th century a number of other factors such as river regulation (listed below) emerged to drive the species even further into decline. All of these drivers of decline left this iconic Australian fish in a perilous situation. There are now concerns for the long-term survival of wild Murray cod populations.

=== Status ===
An example of extreme overfishing of Murray cod in the late 1800s, which caused the first strong declines in the species. Such catches were typical for the period.

Since 3 July 2003 and as of August 2023, the Murray cod is listed as a vulnerable species under the EPBC Act (Environment Protection and Biodiversity Conservation Act 1999). It is listed as a species of least concern on the IUCN Red List of Threatened Species, but under state legislation in both South Australia and Victoria, it is an endangered species.

A study published in Biological Conservation in March 2023 listed 23 species which the authors considered to no longer meet the criteria as threatened species under the EPBC Act, including the Murray cod. The team, led by John Woinarski of Charles Darwin University looked at all species listed as threatened under the act in 2000 and 2022. The Murray cod was the only fish on the list, and the reason for their assessment was given as "Actual recovery over the period 2000–2022, from long period of decline".

=== Threats ===
==== Overfishing ====
While extremely severe commercial and recreational overfishing in the 1800s and the early 1900s caused the first strong declines of Murray cod, overfishing by recreational fishermen, aided by inadequate fishing regulations, continues today and remains an extremely serious threat to Murray cod. The current size limit of 60 centimetres in most states is inadequate now that scientific studies have documented average size at sexual maturity in Murray cod. This and catch data and computer modelling exercises on wild Murray cod stocks indicate measures such as raising the size limit to 70 centimetres and reducing the bag and possession limits from 2 and 4 fish respectively to 1 fish are urgently needed to maintain the long-term viability of wild Murray cod populations. As of November 2014, the NSW Department of Fisheries has introduced a maximum size limit of 75 cm for Murray cod to provide protection for large breeding fish, as well as a new minimum size limit of 55 cm.

Although angler effects are sometimes disregarded in the overall picture today, recent population studies have shown that while all year classes are well represented up to the minimum legal angling size (now 60 centimetres in most states), above that size, numbers of fish are dramatically reduced almost to the point of non-existence in many waters. Some emphasis has been made of the results of two small surveys which suggested a majority of Murray cod are released by anglers. However, there are valid questions as to the representativeness of these surveys: these surveys do not explain the dramatic disappearance of large numbers of young Murray cod at exactly the minimum size limit, and most importantly, any emphasis on these surveys miss the fundamental point — as a large, long-lived species with relatively low fecundity and delayed sexual maturity wild Murray cod populations are extremely vulnerable to overfishing, even with only modest angler-kill. A tightening of fishing regulations for wild Murray cod, as referred to above, and a switch by fishermen to a largely catch and release approach for wild Murray cod would alleviate this problem. Recognising these issues, in late 2014 the New South Wales and Victorian fishery departments amended their regulations so that a slot limit of 55 to 75 cm now applies in these states. (i.e. only Murray cod between 55 and 75 cm may be taken; those above and below this size range or "slot" must be released.) This measure should have positive effects for the Murray cod population by protecting and increasing the proportion of large breeding Murray cod.

Another issue is that Murray cod caught and released in winter, while developing their eggs, or in spring prior to spawning, resorb their eggs and do not spawn. This may be a minor issue compared to some of the other threats facing Murray cod, nevertheless, concerned fishermen try to avoid catching wild Murray cod at these times. At this point in time a closed season is in place for the spring spawning period, during which anglers are not allowed to target Murray cod, even on a catch and release basis.

==== Effects of river regulation ====
The Murray River and southern tributaries originally displayed a pattern of high flows in winter, high flows and floods in spring, and low flows in summer and autumn. The breeding of Murray cod and other Murray-Darling native fish was adapted to these natural flow patterns. River regulation for irrigation has reversed these natural flow patterns, with negative effects on the breeding and recruitment of Murray cod. The Murray and most southern tributaries now experience high irrigation flows in summer and autumn and low flows in winter and spring. Small and medium floods including the once annual spring flood-pulse have been completely eliminated.

It is estimated that flows at the river mouth by 1995 had declined to only 27% of natural outflows. The probability of the bottom end of the Murray experiencing drought-like flows had increased from 5% under natural conditions to 60% by 1995.

Thermal pollution is the artificial reduction in water temperatures, especially in summer and autumn, caused when frigid water is released from the bottom of reservoirs for irrigation demands. Such temperature suppression typically extends several hundred kilometres downstream. Thermal pollution inhibits both the breeding of Murray cod and the survival of Murray cod larvae, and in extreme cases inhibits even the survival of adult Murray cod.

The rare floods that do break free of the dams and weirs of the Murray-Darling system have their magnitude and duration deliberately curtailed by river regulators. Increasing research indicates this management practice is very harmful and drastically reduces the general ecosystem benefits and breeding and recruitment opportunities for Murray cod and other Murray-Darling native fish species these now rare floods can provide.

==== Blackwater events ====
Blackwater events are emerging as a very serious threat to wild Murray cod stocks in lowland river reaches. Blackwater events occur when floodplains and ephemeral channels accumulate large quantities of leaf litter over a number of years and are then finally inundated in a flood event. The leaf litter releases large quantities of dissolved organic carbon, turning the water a characteristic black colour and inducing a temporary explosion in bacterial numbers and activity, which in turn consume dissolved oxygen, reducing them to levels harmful or fatal to fish. (Fish essentially asphyxiate.) Water temperature is a critical regulator of blackwater events as warmer water temperatures increase bacterial activity and markedly reduce the intrinsic oxygen carrying capacity of water; events that may be tolerable for fish in winter or early spring may be catastrophic in late spring or summer due to the increase in water temperature.

Blackwater events are often described as "natural" events—while there are some historical records of relatively severe events in smaller, more ephemeral systems (e.g. lower Lachlan, upper Darling), there is no record of severe events in the Murray River and its largest southern tributaries before water extraction and river regulation. In the Murray and large southern tributaries, very severe large-scale blackwater events are a relatively new but recurring phenomenon and appear to be an effect of river regulation curtailing the winter/spring flood events that formerly swept leaf litter away annually, exacerbated by long-term declines in rainfall and recurring prolonged drought events.

Flood events in 2010 and 2012 following the prolonged Millennium Drought (1997–2009) induced very severe blackwater events; while formal studies of these events were limited due to the relatively rapid response times required and logistical difficulties, angler photographs and observations of extraordinary numbers of dead Murray cod during these events and plunging catch rates after these events show they induced extremely heavy Murray cod mortalities along extensive tracts of the Murray River.

==== Physical barriers to fish movement ====
Dams, weirs and other instream barriers block the migration of adult and juvenile Murray cod and prevent recolonisation of habitats and maintenance of isolated populations. Additionally, recent study has proven approximately 50% of Murray cod larvae are killed when they pass through undershot weirs.

==== Habitat degradation / siltation ====
Hundreds of thousands, perhaps more than a million, submerged timber "snags", mainly river red gum, have been removed from lowland reaches of the Murray-Darling basin over the past 150 years. The removal of such a vast number of snags has had devastating impacts on Murray cod and river ecosystems. Snags are critical habitats and spawning sites for Murray cod. Snags are also critical for the functioning of lowland river ecosystems — as one of the few hard substrates in lowland river channels composed of fine silts snags are crucial sites for biofilm growth, macroinvertebrate grazing and general in-stream productivity.

Vegetation clearing and cattle trampling river banks create severe siltation, which fill in pools, degrade river ecosystems and make rivers and streams uninhabitable for Murray cod. This is exacerbated by removal of riparian (riverbank) vegetation which causes siltation and degrades river ecosystems in many ways.

==== Introduced carp ====
There is serious competition for food between larval/early juvenile introduced carp and larval/early juvenile native fish. Introduced carp dominate the fish faunas of lowland Murray-Darling rivers; the sheer amount of biomass carp now take up, and the large numbers of larvae carp produce, causes serious negative effects on river ecosystems and native fish. Carp are the main vector of the introduced Lernaea parasite (Lernaea cyprinacea) and serious vectors of the introduced Asian fish tapeworm (Bothriocephalus acheilognathi).

==== Introduced pathogens ====
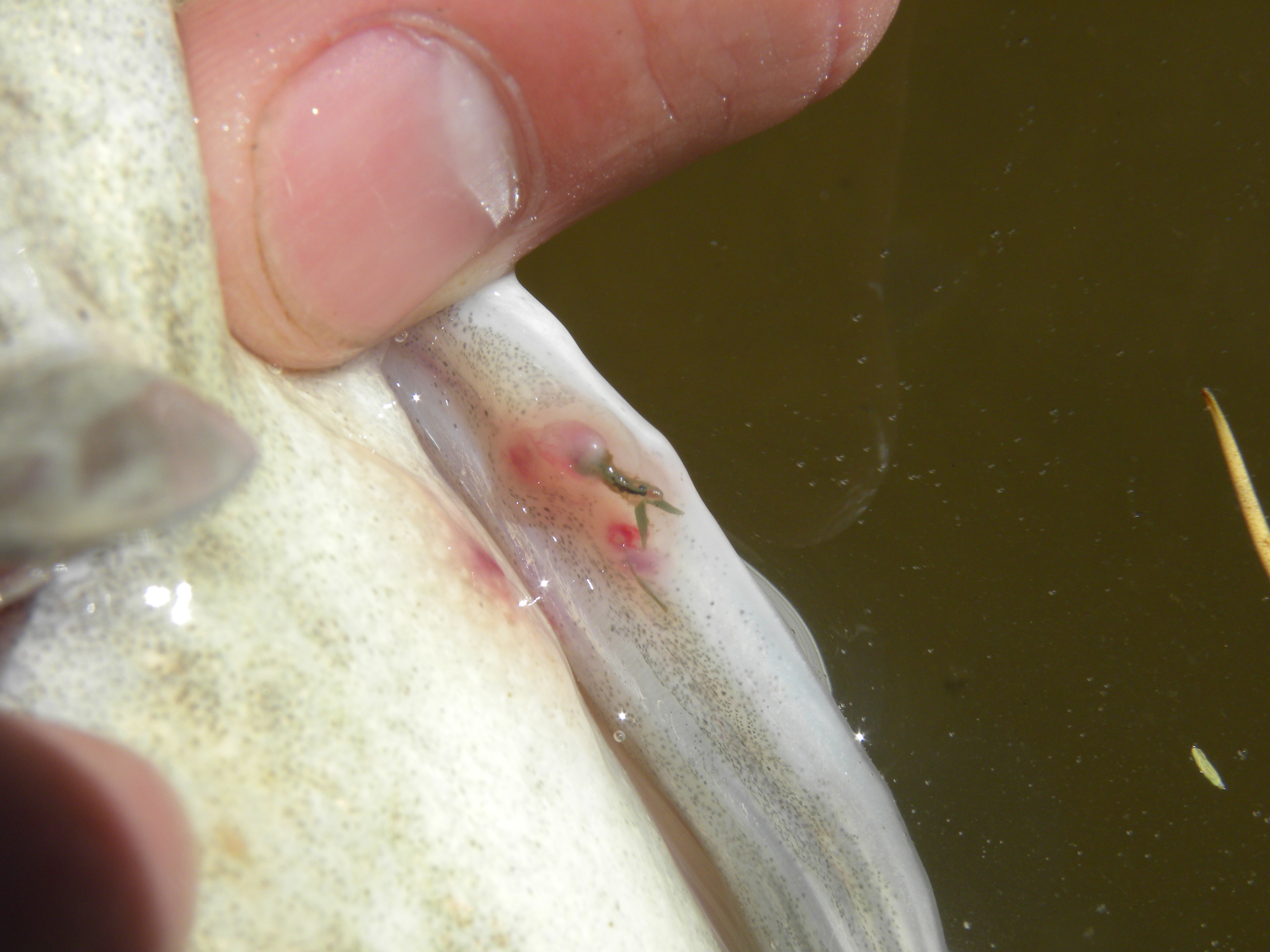
Lernaea parasite on a murray cod

Murray cod have soft skin and very fine scales that leave them particularly vulnerable to infection from exotic diseases and parasites. The following exotic diseases and parasites all seriously affect wild Murray cod; all have been introduced by imports of exotic fish. Chilodonella is a single-celled, parasitic protozoa that infects the skin of Murray cod and has caused a number of serious kills of wild Murray cod. Saprolegnia is a fungus-like oomycete or "water mould" that frequently infects Murray cod eggs and the skin of Murray cod that have been roughly handled through poor catch and release technique. (It is essential that Murray cod intended for release only touch cool wet surfaces and are not put down on any hard, dry, rough or hot surfaces, e.g. boat gunwales, boat floors, dry grass, dry rocks, gravel banks, dry towels or mats, etc. Hands should also be wetted before touching them. They must not be hung vertically by the mouth or gill covers.) Wild Murray cod populations across their range suffer extremely severe infestations of Lernaea or "anchor worm", a parasitic copepod vectored by introduced carp and that burrows into the skin of Murray cod. Lernaea puncture wounds are often secondarily infected by bacteria. Severe Lernaea infestations probably causes the death of many more adult Murray cod than commonly recognised. Ebner reports a young adult Murray cod seemingly killed by severe Lernaea infestation.

=== Conservation measures ===
State government fisheries departments support Murray cod populations by stocking with hatchery-bred fish, especially in man-made lakes. Important issues affecting restoration of cod populations, such as the need for spring floods and excessive angler take, are slowly being acknowledged but are yet to be definitely addressed. Other concerns such as the stocking of Murray cod in areas where trout cod (M. macquariensis) are recovering encourages hybridisation and needs consideration for future restocking programs.

In October 2026, around 600 fish of breeding age were returned to Lake Bonney in South Australia's Riverland region, as part of a project initiated by Recfish SA and supported by the recently established Recreational Fishing Authority, a government agency. The lake had previously been denuded of Murray cod after it got cut off from the river and water quality deteriorated, killing off the fish. The intent of the release is to boost recreational fishing and to improve the quality of the water; however, they will have competition from the carp in the lake, which is again connected to the river, and it is expected that some fish would migrate into it, but return to the lake to breed.

== Relationship with humans ==
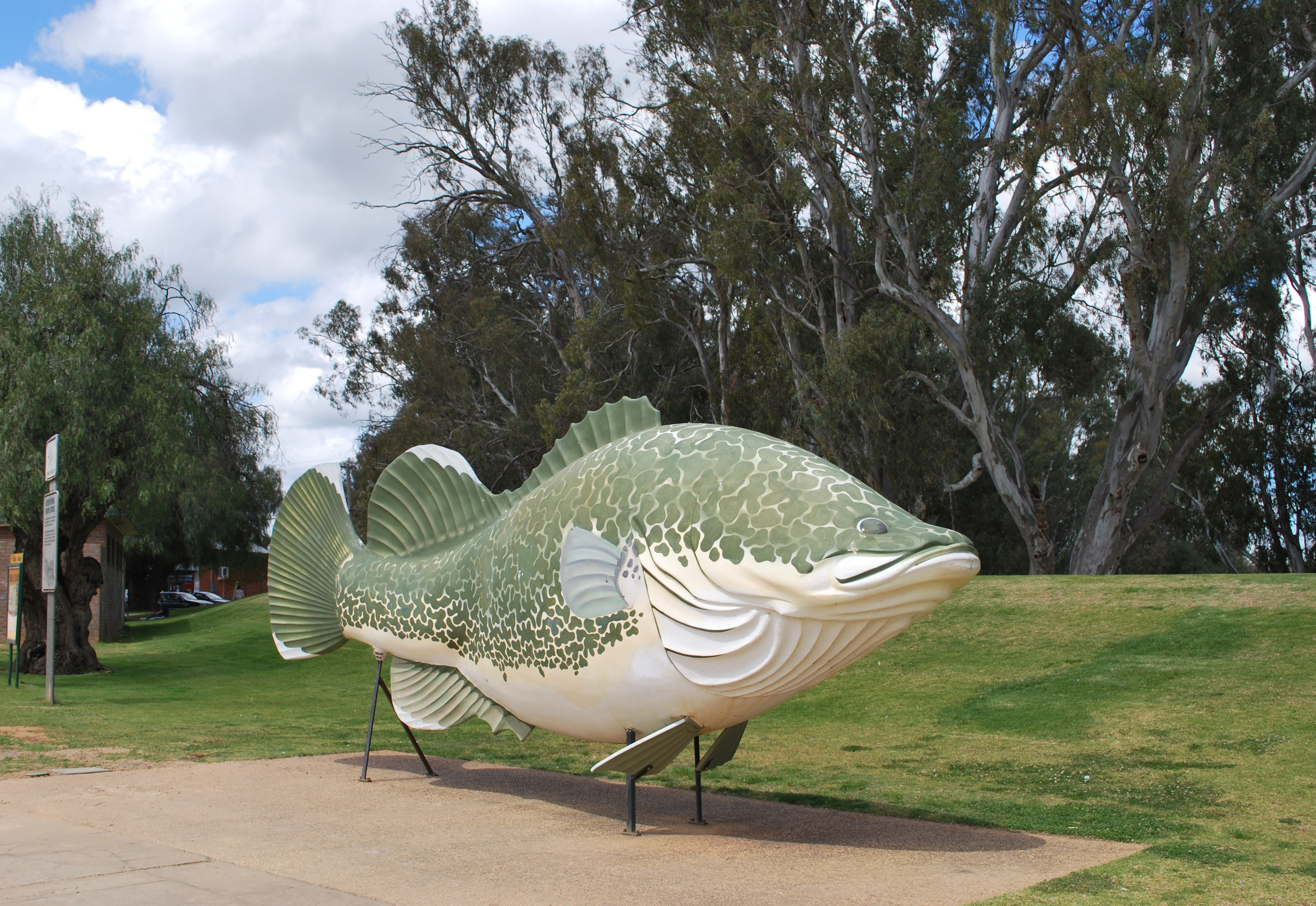
Statue of a Murray cod in Tocumwal, New South Wales

Murray cod play a very important role in the mythology of many Aboriginal tribes in the Murray-Darling basin, and for some tribes, particularly those living along the Murray River, Murray cod were the icon species. The myths of these tribes describe the creation of the Murray River by a gigantic Murray cod fleeing down a small creek to escape from a renowned hunter. In these myths, the fleeing Murray cod enlarges the river and the beating of its tail create the bends in it. The cod is eventually speared near the terminus of the Murray River, chopped into pieces, and the pieces thrown back into the river. The pieces become all the other fish species of the river. The cod's head is kept intact, told to "keep being Murray cod", and also thrown back into the river.

The Gamilaraay and Yuwaalaraay people of northern New South Wales use the name guduu to refer to this species.

Murray cod continue to play important roles in the culture of First Nations Peoples along the Murray and Darling rivers and the Murray-Darling Basin overall.

== Aquaculture ==
The Murray cod is renowned as a good-tasting fish for eating. In recent years, despite the decline in the wild population, farmed fish are being harvested.

It has long been known that Murray cod could be translocated to impounded water. In the 1850s, landholder Terence Aubrey Murray stocked a large and beautiful billabong—Murray's Lagoon just north of Lake George—with Murray cod fished out of the Molonglo River at Murray's other property of Yarralumla. At some time the billabong overflowed and introduced Murray cod into the slightly brackish lake itself. They bred rapidly, and, from the 1850s to the 1890s, Lake George abounded with them. Due to the lengthy Federation Drought, by 1902, the lake dried out completely. In their search for water to survive in, the Murray cod flocked into the mouths of the few small creeks feeding the lake and died there by the thousands.

Farming Murray cod uses fishmeal and fish oil as food, but the species has a better 'wild fish in to farmed fish out' ratio than other farmed species such as rainbow trout and Atlantic salmon. It commands a premium price compared to those species. It is increasingly farmed, in large off-stream dams holding water to be used for irrigation of farmland, where the presence of effluent produced by the fish is not a problem.
