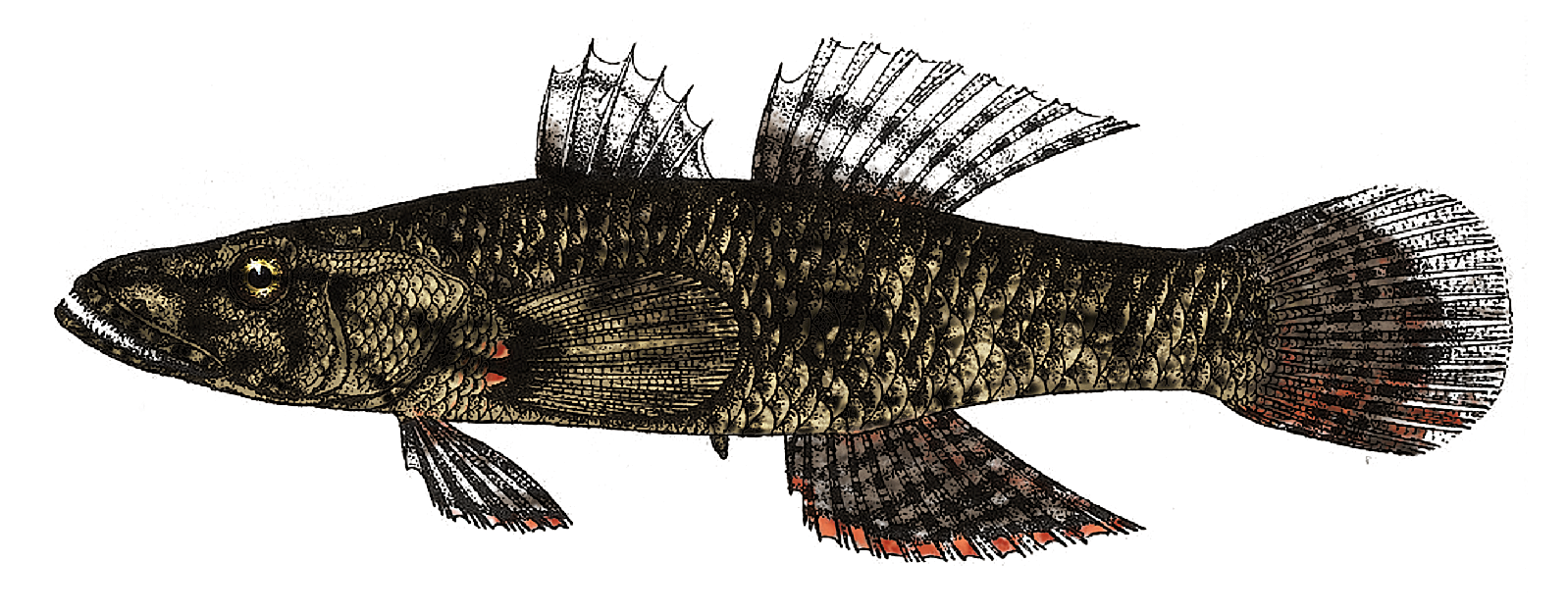
- Butis butis
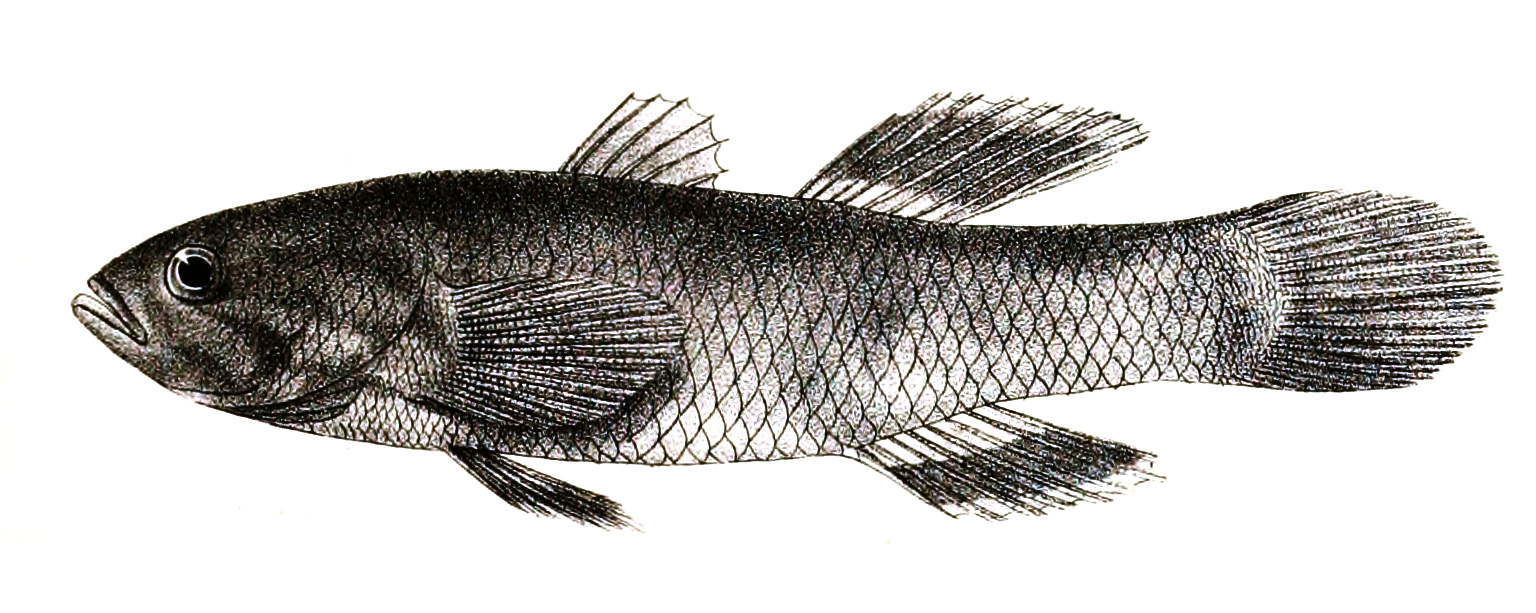
- Ophiocara porocephala

Scientific classification
- Kingdom: Animalia
- Phylum: Chordata
- Class: Actinopterygii
- Order: Gobiiformes
- Suborder: Gobioidei
- Family: Butidae; Bleeker, 1874

= Butidae =

Butidae Temporal range: Early Eocene to present

Family of ray-finned fishes

Butidae is a family of sleeper gobies in the order Gobiiformes. The family was formerly classified as a subfamily of the Eleotridae but the 5th Edition of Fishes of the World classifies it as a family in its own right. Molecular phylogenetic analyses have demonstrated that the Butidae are a sister clade to the clade containing the families Gobiidae and Gobionellidae and that the Eleotridae is a sister to both of these clades. This means that the Eloetridae as formerly classified was paraphyletic and that its subfamilies should be raised to the status of families.

The species in the Butidae are largely restricted to tropical and sub-tropical waters of Africa, Asia, Australia, and Oceania. They are especially diverse in New Guinea, Australia and New Zealand where they can be important components of brackish and freshwater ecosystems. They are mostly quite small species but the marbled goby (Oxyeleotris marmorata) is a freshwater species of Buitdae from Southeast Asia that can grow to 65 cm (25.6 in) long and is an important food fish.

The earliest known member of the Butidae is the stem group-butid †Carlomonnius Bannikov & Carnevale, 2016 from the Early Eocene-aged Monte Bolca site of Italy. This genus is also the earliest gobioid known from skeletal remains. It was previously considered a gobioid of uncertain affinities, but a 2025 study analyzing more specimens found strong evidence for it being closely related to the Butidae. Carlomonnius had a lifestyle unlike any extant butids, being a very small marine genus that inhabited reef environments, suggesting a similar lifestyle to coral gobies of the Gobiidae. This is unlike extant butids, which primarily inhabit freshwater and brackish habitats, with none inhabiting reef ecosystems.

== Genera ==
The following genera are classified within the family Butidae:

- Bostrychus Lacépède, 1801
- Butis Bleeker, 1856
- Formosaneleotris Chen, 2024
- Incara Visweswara Rao, 1971
- Kribia Herre, 1946
- Odonteleotris Gill, 1863
- Ophiocara Gill, 1863
- Oxyeleotris Bleeker, 1874
- Paloa Herre, 1927
- Parviparma Herre, 1927
- Pogoneleotris Bleeker, 1875
- Prionobutis Bleeker, 1874

The following fossil genera are also known:

- †Carlomonnius Bannikov & Carnevale, 2016 (Early Eocene of Italy)
- †Lepidocottus Sauvage, 1875 (Early Oligocene to Early Miocene of Italy, France, Germany, and central Europe)
