= List of introduced fish in Australia =

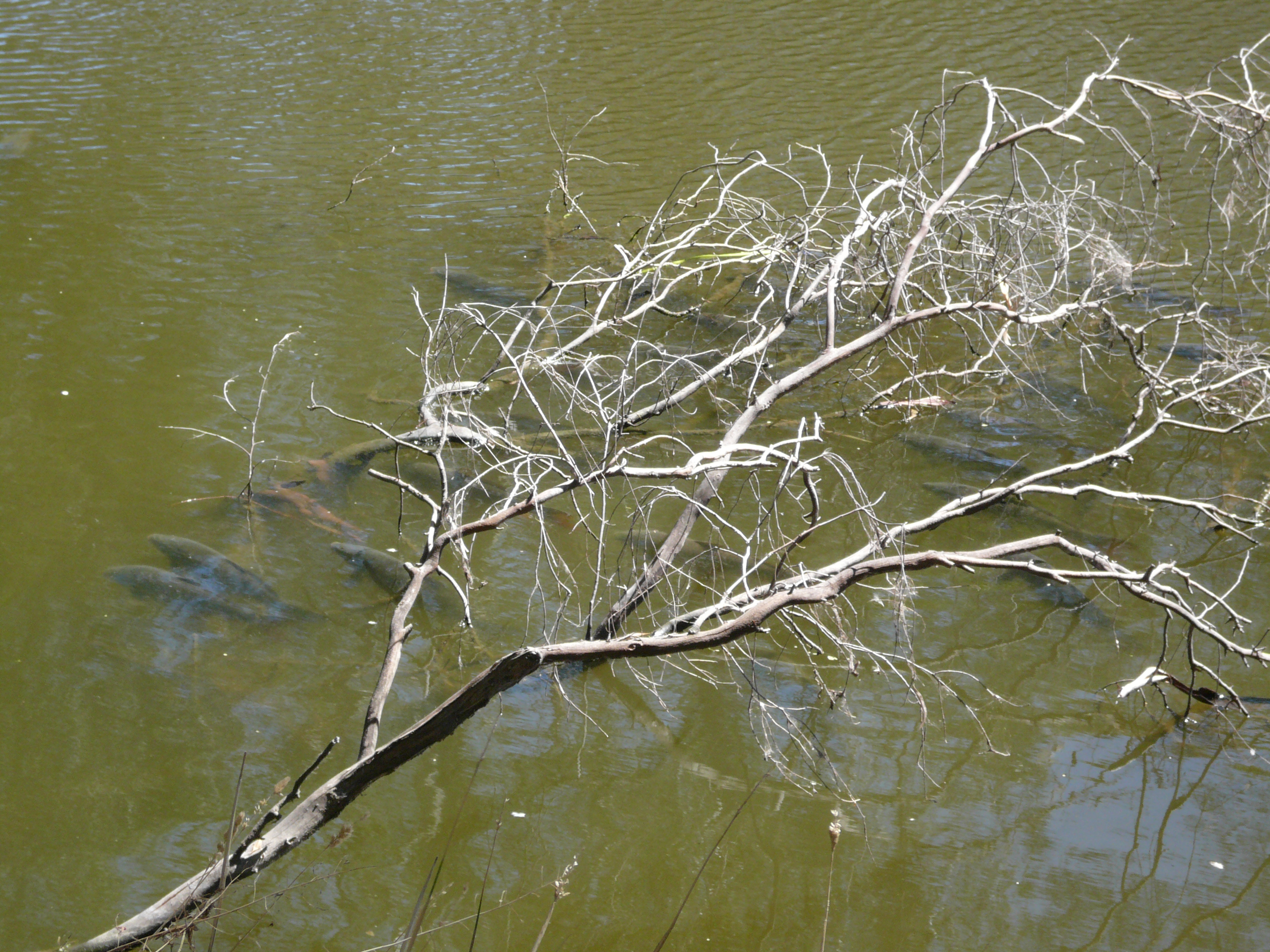
Carp in Maribyrnong River, Australia

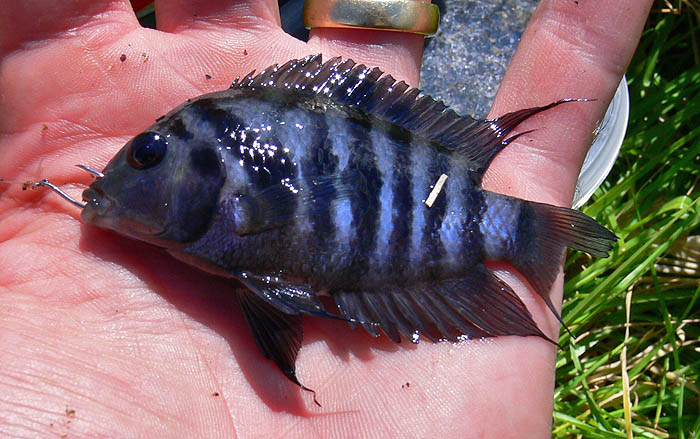
A male convict cichlid caught on a hook and line, in the heated outflow of a coal powerplant in Victoria, Australia

Due to its geographical situation and isolation Australia has distinct fish fauna, including many endemic species. From the 18th century, early colonisers began introducing a number of exotic species including mammals, plant, birds and fish. The introduction of such fish has led to serious ecological damage, most notable being the effect of common carp in the Murray–Darling basin. Introduced carp now dominate the freshwater systems of southern Australia. While the damaging impact of carp is well recognised, little in the way of control measures have been employed to control their spread. Their ability to colonise almost any body of water, even those previously considered to be beyond their physical tolerances, is now well established. Control of exotic fish species is being undertaken by various government departments, though many problems are faced.

Introduced trout species dominate the upland reaches of rivers in southeast Australia, and may have negative effects on upland native fish like the mountain galaxias species, Macquarie perch and the trout cod, but due to their popularity as sport fish, lack of historical records, and loss of angling memories, their damaging effects are not widely understood.

All recently established exotic fish in Australia stem from the illegal release of aquarium fish species. With the continued and largely uncontrolled importation of many high-risk fish species for the aquarium industry, Australia continues to be at risk of further invasions of exotic fish.

== List of introduced fish ==
- American flagfish, Jordanella floridae
- Atlantic salmon, Salmo salar
- Brook trout, Salvelinus fontinalis
- Brown trout, Salmo trutta
- Chinook Salmon, Oncorhynchus tshawytscha
- Common carp, Cyprinus carpio
- Convict cichlid, Archocentrus nigrofasciatus
- Domingo mosquitofish, Gambusia dominicensis
- Eastern mosquitofish, Gambusia holbrooki
- Goldfish, Carassius auratus
- Guppy, Poecilia reticulata
- Jack Dempsey, Cichlasoma octofasciatum
- Mosquitofish, Gambusia affinis
- Mozambique mouthbrooder, Oreochromis mossambicus
- One-spot live bearer, Phalloceros caudimaculatus
- Platy, Xiphophorus maculatus
- Rainbow trout, Oncorhynchus mykiss
- Redfin perch, Perca fluviatilis
- Roach, Rutilis rutilis
- Rosy barb, Puntius conchonius
- Sailfin molly, Poecilia latipinna
- Speckled mosquitofish, Phalloceros caudimaculatus
- Spotted tilapia, Tilapia mariae
- Swordtail, Xiphophorus helleri
- Tench, Tinca tinca
- Weather loach, Misgurnus anguillicaudatus

== See also ==
- Invasive species in Australia
- Fauna of Australia
- Mosquitofish in Australia
- Jack Dempsey cichlids in Australia
