= Flora and fauna of Australia =

Flora and fauna of Australia may refer to:

- Flora of Australia
- Fauna of Australia
