= Fauna of Australia =

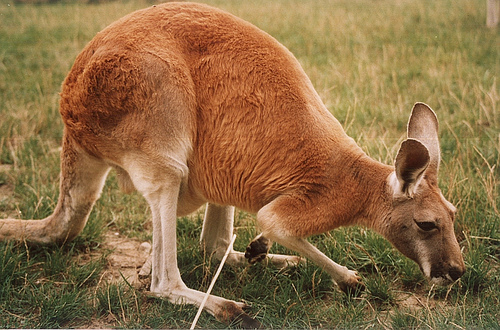
The red kangaroo is the largest extant macropod and is one of Australia's heraldic animals, appearing with the emu on the coat of arms of Australia.

The fauna of Australia consists of a large variety of animals; some 46% of birds, 69% of mammals, 94% of amphibians, and 93% of reptiles that inhabit the continent are endemic to it. This high level of endemism can be attributed to the continent's long geographic isolation, tectonic stability, and the effects of a unique pattern of climate change on the soil and flora over geological time.

A unique feature of Australia's fauna is the relative scarcity of native placental mammals. Consequently, the marsupials – a group of mammals that raise their young in a pouch, including the macropods, possums and dasyuromorphs – occupy many of the ecological niches placental animals occupy elsewhere in the world. Australia is home to two of the five known extant species of monotremes and has numerous venomous species, which include the platypus, spiders, scorpions, octopus, jellyfish, molluscs, stonefish, and stingrays. Uniquely, Australia has more venomous than non-venomous species of snakes.

The settlement of Australia by Indigenous Australians between 48,000 and 70,000 years ago and by Europeans from 1788, has significantly affected the fauna. Hunting, the introduction of non-native species, and land-management practices involving the modification or destruction of habitats have led to numerous extinctions. Based on the list of Australian animals extinct in the Holocene, about 33 mammals (27 from the mainland, including the thylacine), 24 birds (three from the mainland), one reptile, and three frog species or subspecies are strongly believed to have become extinct in Australia during the Holocene epoch. These figures exclude dubious taxa like the Roper River scrub robin (Drymodes superciliaris colcloughi) and possibly extinct taxa like the Christmas Island shrew (Crocidura trichura). Unsustainable land use still threatens the survival of many species. To target threats to the survival of its fauna, Australia has passed wide-ranging federal and state legislation and established numerous protected areas.

== Origins and history ==
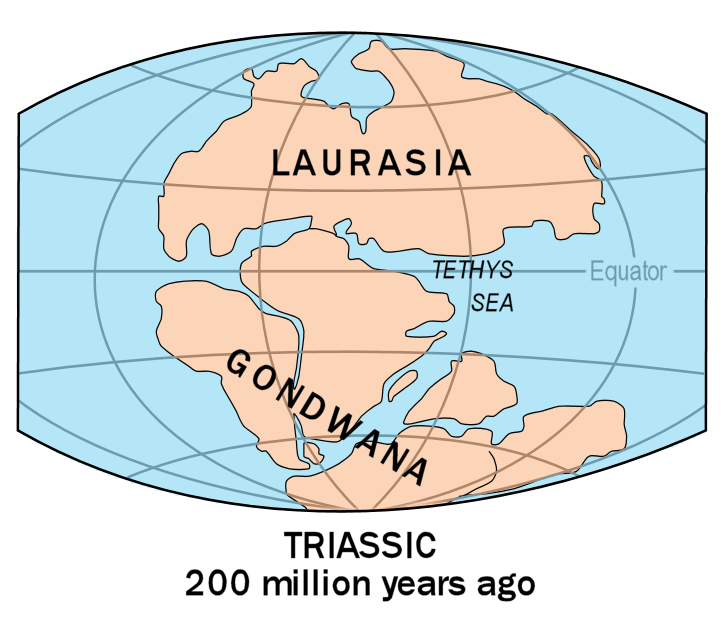
Evidence suggests that Australia was a part of the supercontinent Gondwana

Both geologic and climatic events helped to make Australia's fauna unique. Australia was once part of the southern supercontinent Gondwana, which also included South America, Africa, India and Antarctica. Gondwana began to break up 140 million years ago (MYA); 50 MYA Australia separated from Antarctica and was relatively isolated until the collision of the Indo-Australian Plate with Asia in the Miocene epoch 5.3 MYA. The establishment and evolution of the present-day fauna was apparently shaped by the unique climate and the geology of the continent. As Australia drifted, it was, to some extent, isolated from the effects of global climate change. The unique fauna that originated in Gondwana, such as the marsupials, survived and adapted in Australia.

After the Miocene, fauna of Asian origin were able to establish themselves in Australia. The Wallace Line — the hypothetical line separating the zoogeographical regions of Asia and Australasia — marks the tectonic boundary between the Eurasian and Indo-Australian plates. This continental boundary prevented the formation of land bridges and resulted in a distinct zoological distribution, with limited overlap, of most Asian and Australian fauna, with the exception of birds. Following the emergence of the circumpolar current in the mid-Oligocene era (some 15 MYA), the Australian climate became increasingly arid, giving rise to a diverse group of arid-specialised organisms, just as the wet tropical and seasonally wet areas gave rise to their own uniquely adapted species.

== Mammals ==
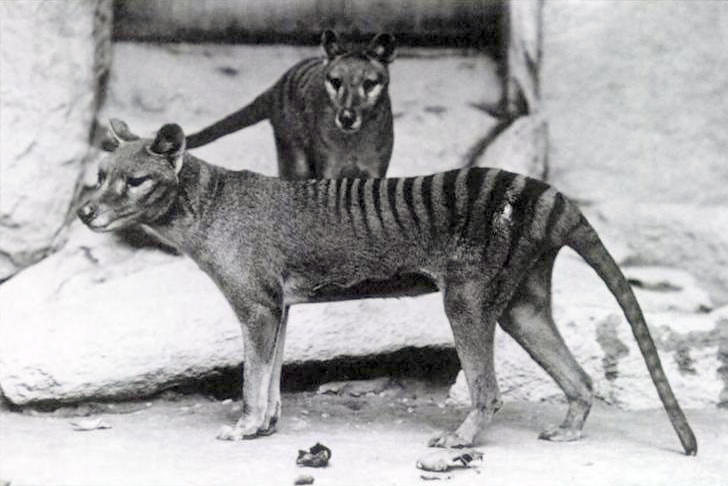
Becoming extinct in 1936, the Tasmanian tiger was the largest carnivorous marsupial to have survived into modern times.

Australia has a rich mammalian fossil history, as well as a variety of extant mammalian species, dominated by the marsupials, currently however there is limited taxonomic research into Australia's mammals. The fossil record shows that monotremes have been present in Australia since the Early Cretaceous 145–99 MYA, and that marsupials and placental mammals date from the Eocene 56–34 MYA, when modern mammals first appeared in the fossil record.

Although terrestrial marsupials and placental mammals did coexist in Australia in the Eocene, only the marsupials have survived to the present. Non-volant placental mammals made their reappearance in Australia in the Miocene, when Australia moved closer to Indonesia, and rodents started to appear reliably in the Late Miocene fossil record. The marsupials evolved to fill specific ecological niches, and in many cases they are physically similar to the placental mammals in Eurasia and North America that occupy similar niches, a phenomenon known as convergent evolution. For example, the top predator in Australia, the thylacine, bore a striking resemblance to canids.

Gliding possums and flying squirrels have similar adaptations enabling their arboreal lifestyle; and the numbat and anteaters are both digging insectivores. For the most part, mammals are not a highly visible part of the faunal landscape, as most species are nocturnal and many arboreal.

=== Monotremes and marsupials ===
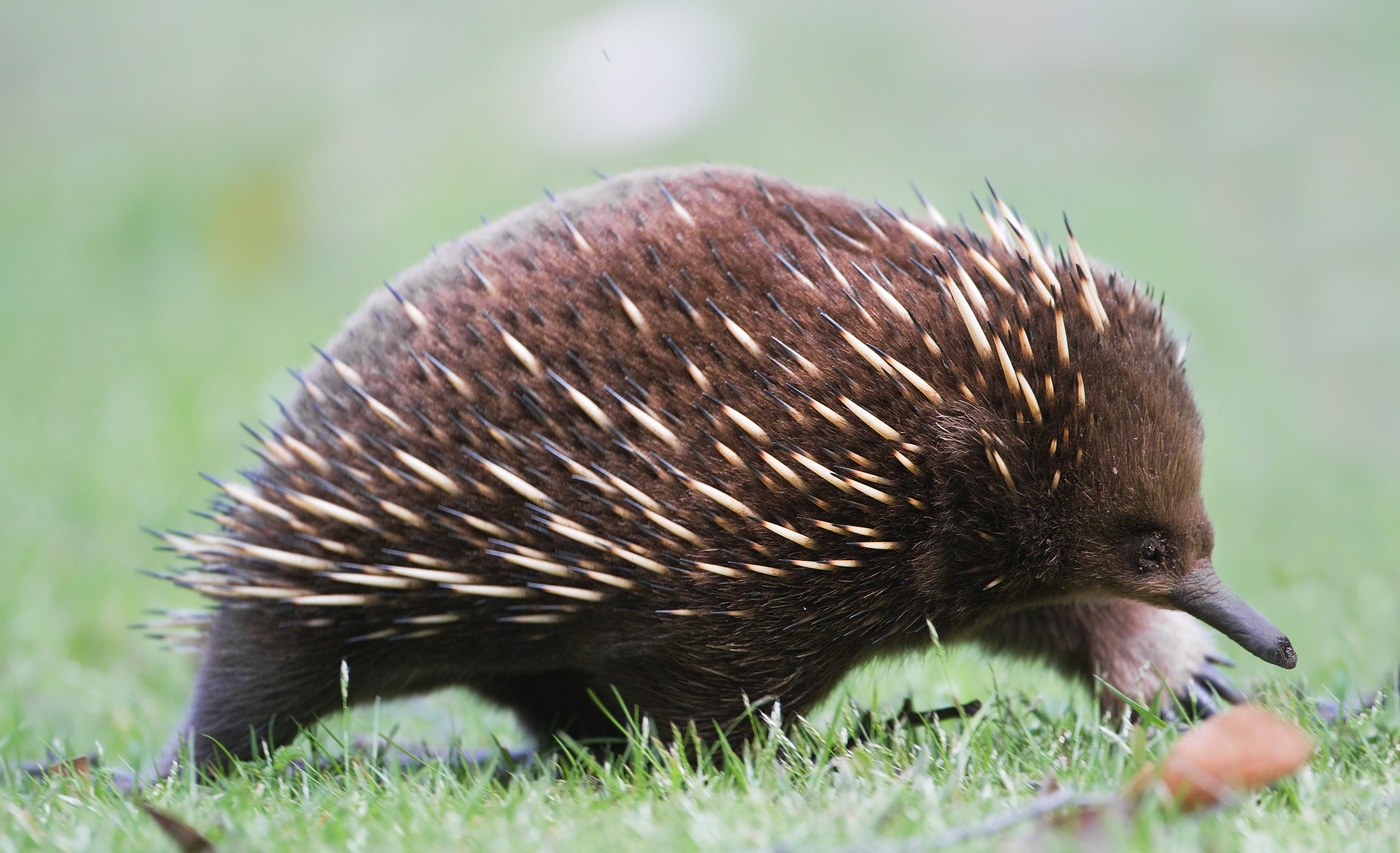
Short-beaked echidna

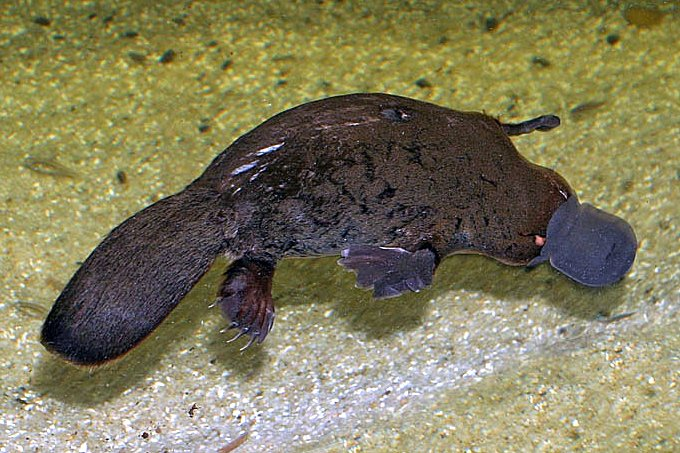
Platypus

Two of the five living species of monotreme occur in Australia: the platypus and the short-beaked echidna, the other three being the long-beaked echidnas which are only known to occur in New Guinea. Monotremes differ from other mammals in their methods of reproduction; in particular, they lay eggs instead of giving birth to live young. The platypus — a venomous, egg-laying, duck-billed amphibious mammal — is considered to be one of the strangest creatures in the animal kingdom. When it was first presented by Joseph Banks to English naturalists, it was thought to be a hoax. The short-beaked echidna is covered in hairy spikes, with a tubular snout in the place of a mouth, and a tongue that can move in, and out of the snout at a rate of 100 times a minute to capture its prey of worms and insects.

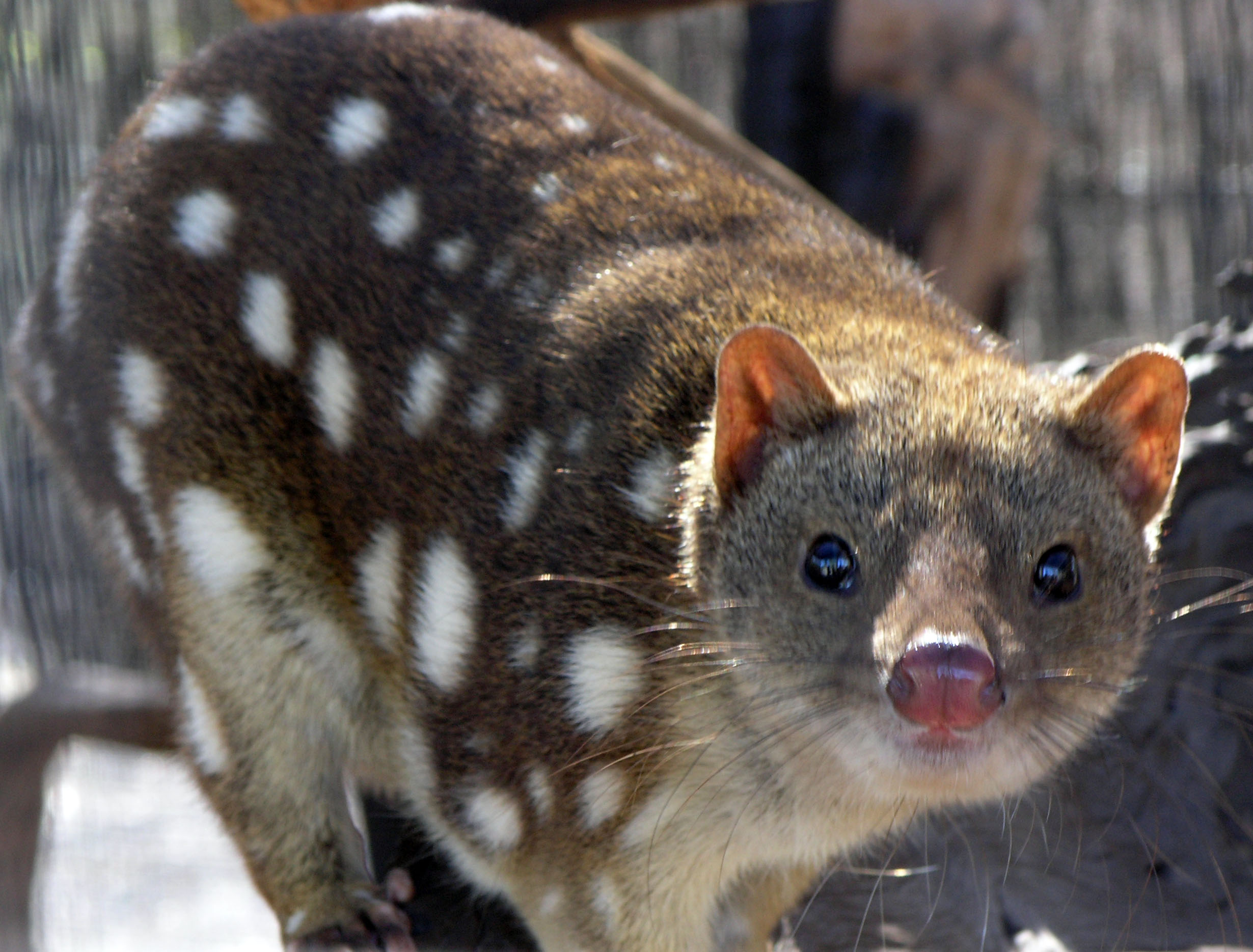
The tiger quoll is mainland Australia's largest carnivorous marsupial, and an endangered species.

Australia has the world's largest, and most diverse range of marsupials. Marsupials are characterised by the presence of a pouch, in which they rear their young after birth. The carnivorous marsupials — Dasyuromorphia — are represented by two surviving families: the Dasyuridae with 51 members, and the Myrmecobiidae with the numbat as its sole extant species. The thylacine was the largest member of Dasyuromorphia and the last living species of the family Thylacinidae until the last recorded specimen died in captivity in 1936.

The largest surviving carnivorous marsupial is the Tasmanian devil; it is the size of a small dog and can hunt, although it is mainly a scavenger. The Tasmanian devil and the thylacine both became extinct on the mainland some 3600 years ago after the introduction of the dingo, and were made endemic to Tasmania. There are four native species of quoll, all of which are threatened species. The eastern quoll for example is believed to have been extinct on the mainland since the 1960s, though there are efforts to reintroduce it. The remainder of the Dasyuridae are referred to as "marsupial mice"; most weigh less than 100 g. There are two species of marsupial mole — order Notoryctemorphia — that inhabit the deserts of Western Australia. These rare, blind and earless carnivorous creatures spend most of their time underground; little is known about them.

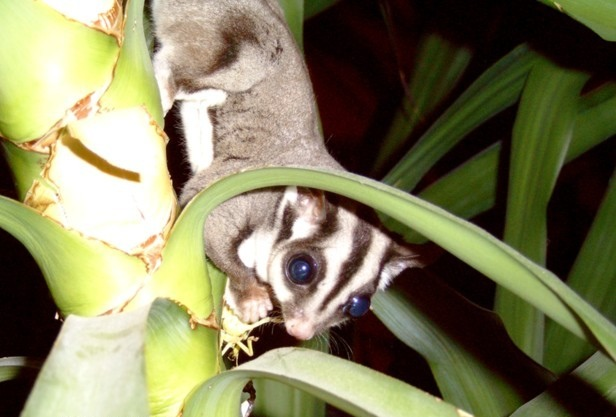
The sugar glider

The bandicoots and bilbies — order Peramelemorphia — are marsupial omnivores. There are seven extant species in Australia, most of which are endangered. These small creatures share several characteristic physical features: a plump, arch-backed body with a long, delicately tapering snout, large upright ears, long, thin legs, and a thin tail. The evolutionary origin of this group is unclear, because they share characteristics from both carnivorous and herbivorous marsupials.

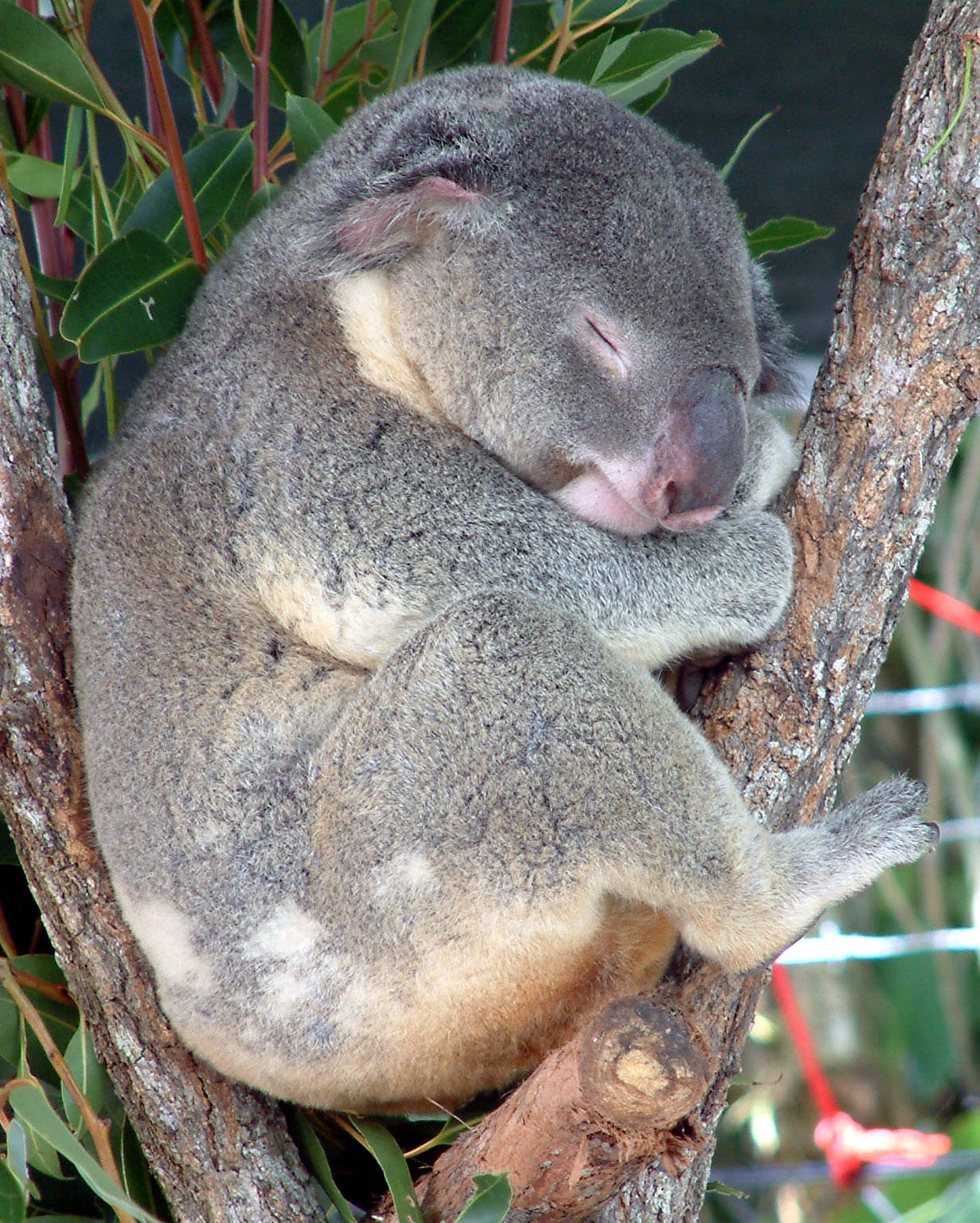
The koala does not normally need to drink, because it can obtain all of the moisture it needs by eating leaves.

Marsupials with two front teeth (diprotodont) on the lower jaw and syndactyly are classified in the order Diprotodontia, and further into the suborders Vombatiformes, Macropodiformes and Phalangerida. The Vombatiformes include the koala and the three species of wombat. One of Australia's best-known marsupials, the koala is an arboreal species that feeds on the leaves of various species of eucalyptus. Wombats, on the other hand, live on the ground and feed on grasses, sedges and roots. Wombats use their diprotodont teeth and powerful claws to dig extensive burrow systems; they are mainly crepuscular and nocturnal.

The Phalangerida includes six families and 26 species of possum and three families with 53 species of macropod. The possums are a diverse group of arboreal marsupials and vary in size from the little pygmy possum, weighing just 7 g, to the cat-sized common ringtail and brushtail possums. The sugar and squirrel gliders are common species of gliding possum, found in the eucalypt forests of eastern Australia, while the feathertail glider is the smallest glider species. The gliding possums have membranes called "patagia" that extend from the fifth finger of their forelimb back to the first toe of their hind foot. These membranes, when outstretched, allow them to glide between trees.

The macropods are divided into three families: the Hypsiprymnodontidae, with the musky rat-kangaroo as its only member; the Potoroidae, with 11 species; and the Macropodidae, with 45 species. Macropods are found in all Australian environments except alpine areas. The Potoroidae include the bettongs, potoroos and the rufous rat-kangaroo, small species that make nests and carry plant material with their tails. The Macropodiae include kangaroos, wallabies and associated species; size varies widely within this family. Most macropods have large hind legs and long, narrow hind feet, with a distinctive arrangement of four toes, and powerfully muscled tails, which they use to hop around. The musky rat-kangaroo is the smallest macropod and the only species that is quadrupedal not bipedal, while the male red kangaroo is the largest, reaching a height of about 2 m and weighing up to 85 kg.

=== Placental mammals ===
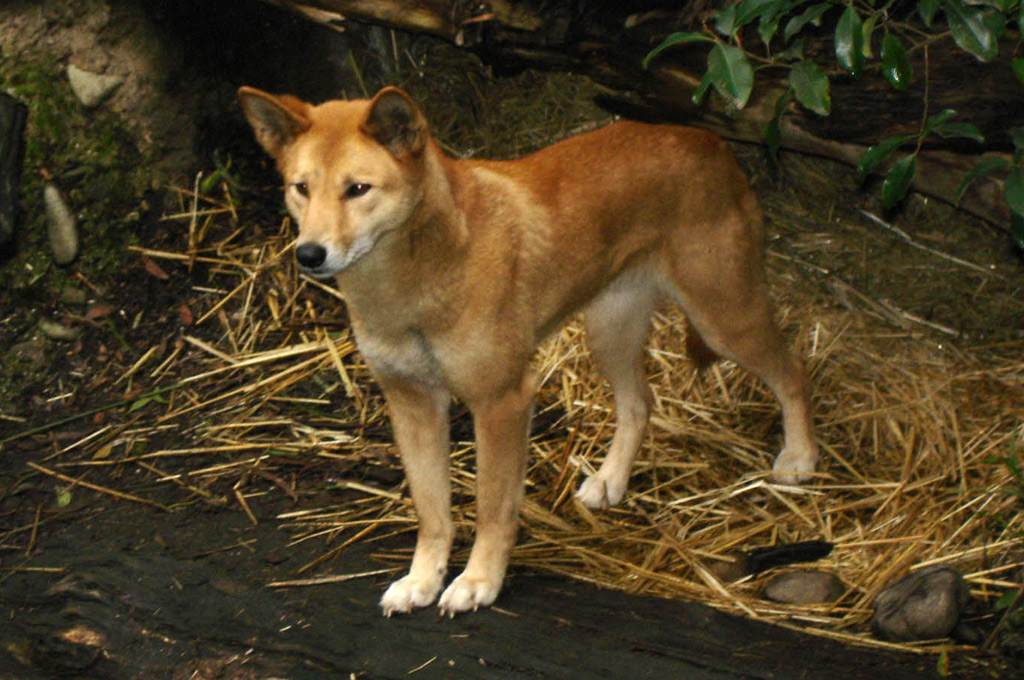
The dingo was the first placental mammal introduced to Australia by humans, around 3,500 years ago.

Australia has indigenous placental mammals from two orders: the bats — order Chiroptera — represented by six families; and the mice and rats — order Rodentia, family Muridae. There are only two endemic genera of bats, although 7% of the world's bat species live in Australia. Rodents first arrived in Australia 5–10 MYA, undergoing a wide radiation to produce the species collectively known as the "old endemics". There are 13 extant genera of old endemic rodents. A million years ago, the rat entered Australia from New Guinea and evolved into the seven native species of the true rat genus Rattus. These species are collectively referred to as the "new endemics".

Since human settlement many additional placental mammals have been introduced to Australia and are now feral. The first placental mammal introduced to Australia was the dingo. Fossil evidence suggests that people from the north brought the dingo to Australia about 3,500 years ago. When Europeans settled Australia they intentionally released many species into the wild including the red fox, European hare, and the European rabbit. Other domestic species have escaped and over time have produced wild populations including the banteng, cat, fallow deer, red deer, sambar deer, rusa deer, chital, hog deer, horse, donkey, pig, goat, water buffalo, and the camel. Only three species of non-native placental mammal were not deliberately introduced to Australia: the house mouse, black rat and the brown rat.

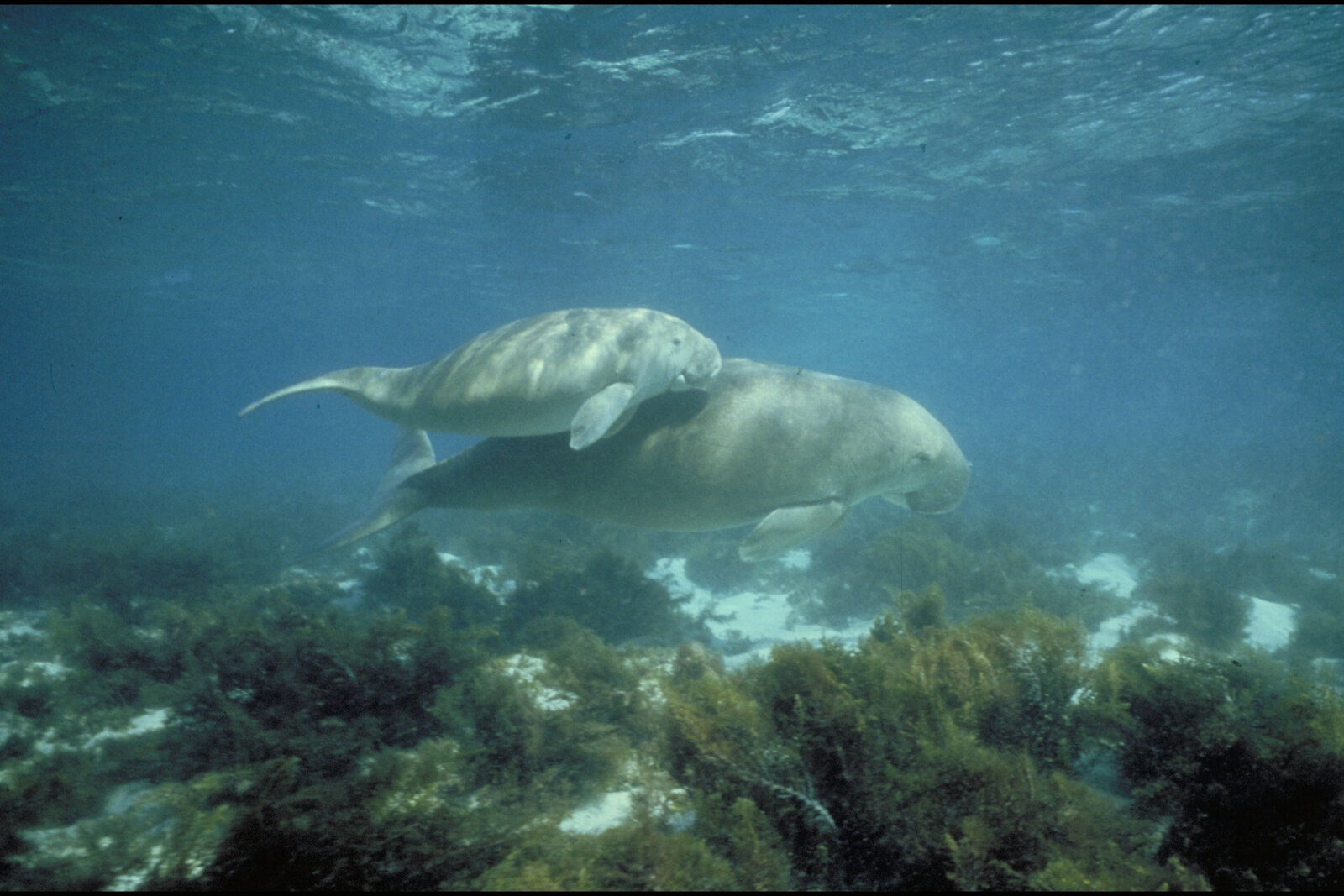
The dugong is an endangered species; the largest remaining population is found in Australian waters.

Forty-six marine mammals from the infraorder Cetacea are found in Australian coastal waters. Since the majority of these species have global distribution, some authors do not consider them to be Australian species. There are eleven species of baleen whale present; humpback whales, southern right whales, dwarf minke whales and pygmy blue whales are more commonly observed. There are 37 species of toothed whale, which include all six genera of the family Ziphiidae, and 21 species of oceanic dolphin, including the Australian snubfin dolphin, a species first described in 2005. Some oceanic dolphins, such as the orca, can be found in all waters around the continent; others, such as the Irrawaddy dolphin, are confined to the warm northern waters. The dugong is an endangered marine species that inhabits the waters of north-eastern and north-western Australia, particularly the Torres Strait. It can grow up to 3 m long and weigh as much as 400 kg. The dugong is the only herbivorous marine mammal in Australia, feeding on sea grass in coastal areas. The destruction of sea grass beds is a threat to the survival of this species. Eleven species of seal — family Pinnipedia — live off the southern coast.

== Birds ==
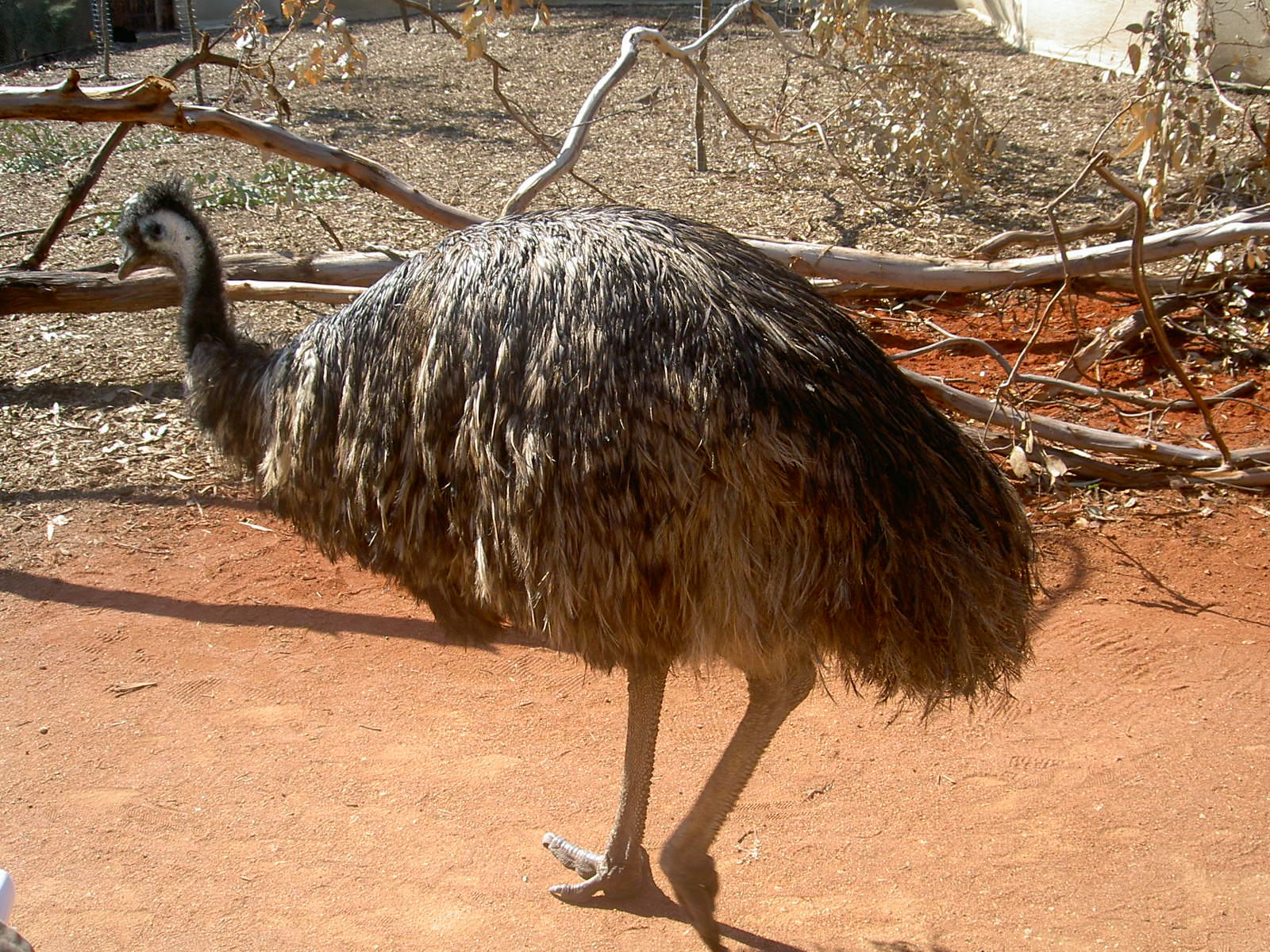
The emu is the third tallest species of bird (after the two species of ostrich). It is a heraldic bird, appearing on the coat of arms of Australia.

Australia and its territories are home to around 800 species of bird; 45% of these are endemic to Australia. The fossil record of birds in Australia is patchy; however, there are records of the ancestors of contemporary species as early as the Late Oligocene. Birds with a Gondwanan history include the flightless ratites (the emu and southern cassowary), megapodes (the malleefowl and Australian brush-turkey), and a huge group of endemic parrots, order Psittaciformes. Australian parrots comprise a sixth of the world's parrots, including many cockatoos and galahs. The kookaburra is the largest species of the kingfisher family, known for its call, which sounds uncannily like loud, echoing human laughter. The Brolga is the only crane exclusive to Australia, and it shares habitat with the more widely distributed Sarus Cranes.

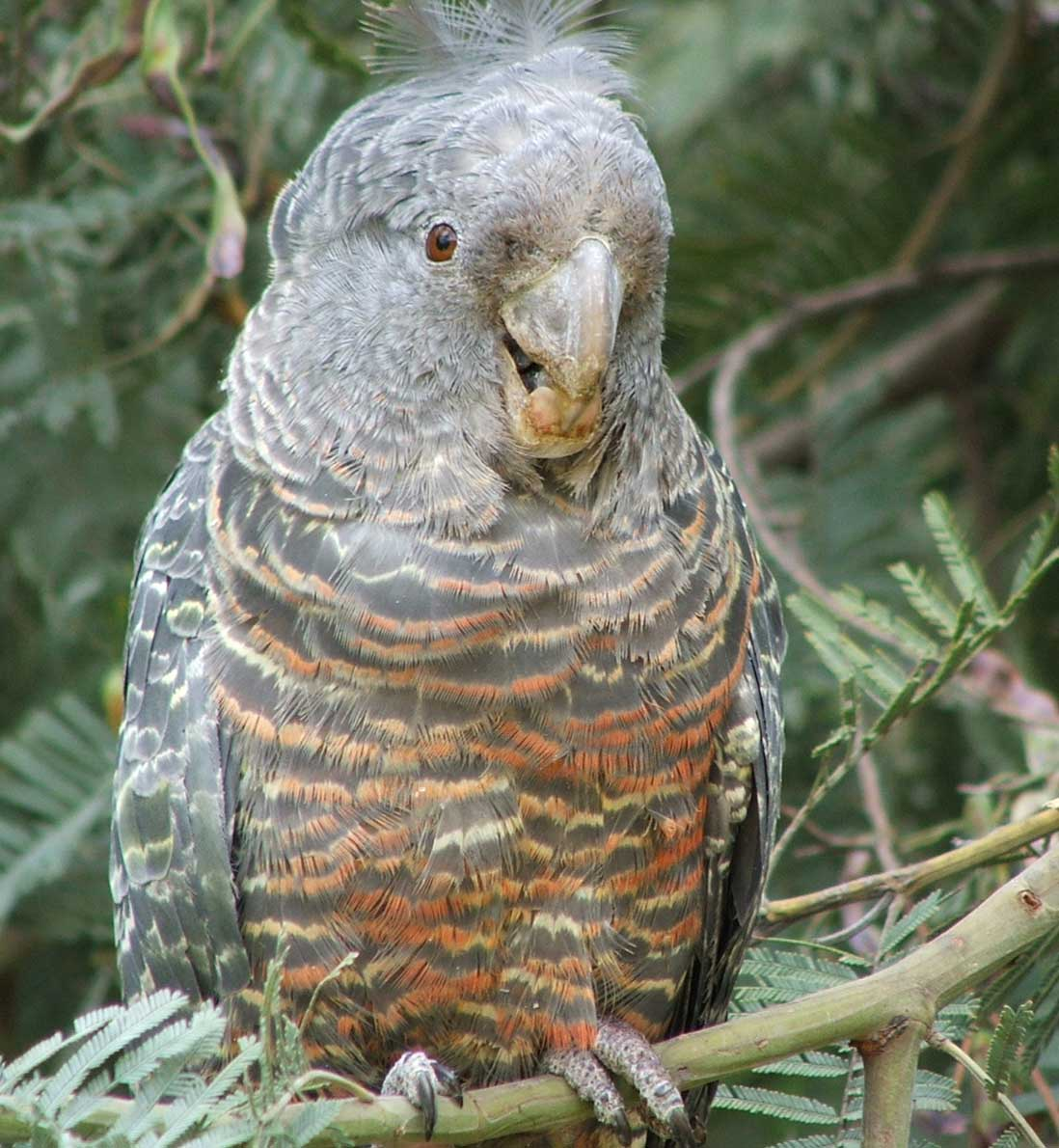
A female gang-gang cockatoo

The passerines of Australia, also known as songbirds or perching birds, include wrens, robins, the magpie group, thornbills, pardalotes, the huge honeyeater family, treecreepers, lyrebirds, birds of paradise and bowerbirds. The satin bowerbird has attracted the interest of evolutionary psychologists; it has a complex courtship ritual in which the male creates a bower filled with blue, shiny items to woo mates.

Relatively recent colonists from Eurasia are swallows, larks, thrushes, cisticolas, sunbirds, and some raptors, including the large wedge-tailed eagle. A number of bird species have been introduced by humans; some, like the European goldfinch and greenfinch, coexist happily with Australian species, while others, such as the common starling, common blackbird, house sparrow and Indian mynah, are destructive of some native bird species and thus destabilise the native ecosystem.

About 200 species of seabird live on the Australian coast, including many species of migratory seabird. Australia is at the southern end of the East Asian-Australasian Flyway for migratory water birds, which extends from Far-East Russia and Alaska through Southeast Asia to Australia and New Zealand. About two million birds travel this route to and from Australia each year. One very common large seabird is the Australian pelican, which can be found in most waterways in Australia. The Australian little penguin is the only species of penguin that breeds on mainland Australia.

== Amphibians and reptiles ==
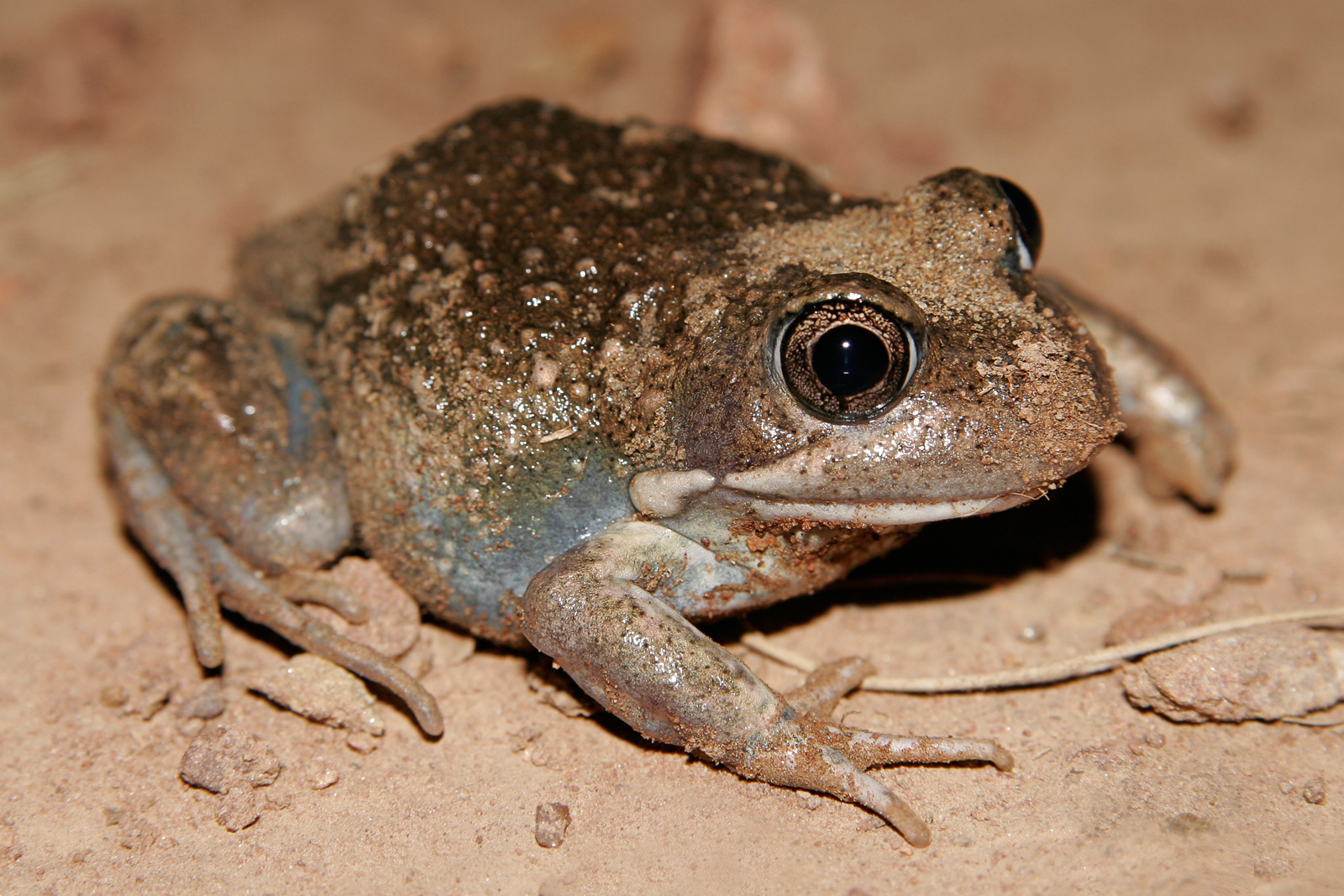
The eastern banjo frog is a common frog species across eastern Australia.

Australia has four families of native frogs and one introduced toad, the cane toad. In 1935 the cane toad was introduced to Australia in a failed attempt to control pests in sugarcane crops. It has since become a devastating pest, spreading across northern Australia. As well as competing with native insectivores for food, the cane toad produces a venom that is toxic to native fauna, as well as to humans. The Myobatrachidae, or southern frogs, are Australia's largest group of frogs, with 112 species classified into anywhere from 17 to 22 genera. Notable members of this group are the colourful and endangered corroboree frogs. The tree frogs, from family Hylidae, are common in high rainfall areas on the north and east coasts; there are 77 Australian species from three genera. The 18 species from two genera of the Microhylidae frogs are restricted to the rainforests of northern Australia and nearby habitats; the smallest species, the scanty frog, is from this family. There is a single species from the world's dominant frog group, family Ranidae – the Australian wood frog – which only occurs in the Queensland rainforests. As elsewhere, there has been a precipitous decline in Australia's frog populations in recent years. Although the full reasons for the decline are uncertain, it can be at least partly attributed to the fatal amphibian fungal disease chytridiomycosis. Another theory for the decline might be, as research shows, that species from the Southern Hemisphere are on average 4.6 million years old, compared to an average 2.9 million years old for the Northern Hemisphere: Researchers believe this age difference is because of the history of severe ice ages in the Northern Hemisphere, which may drive older species to extinction.

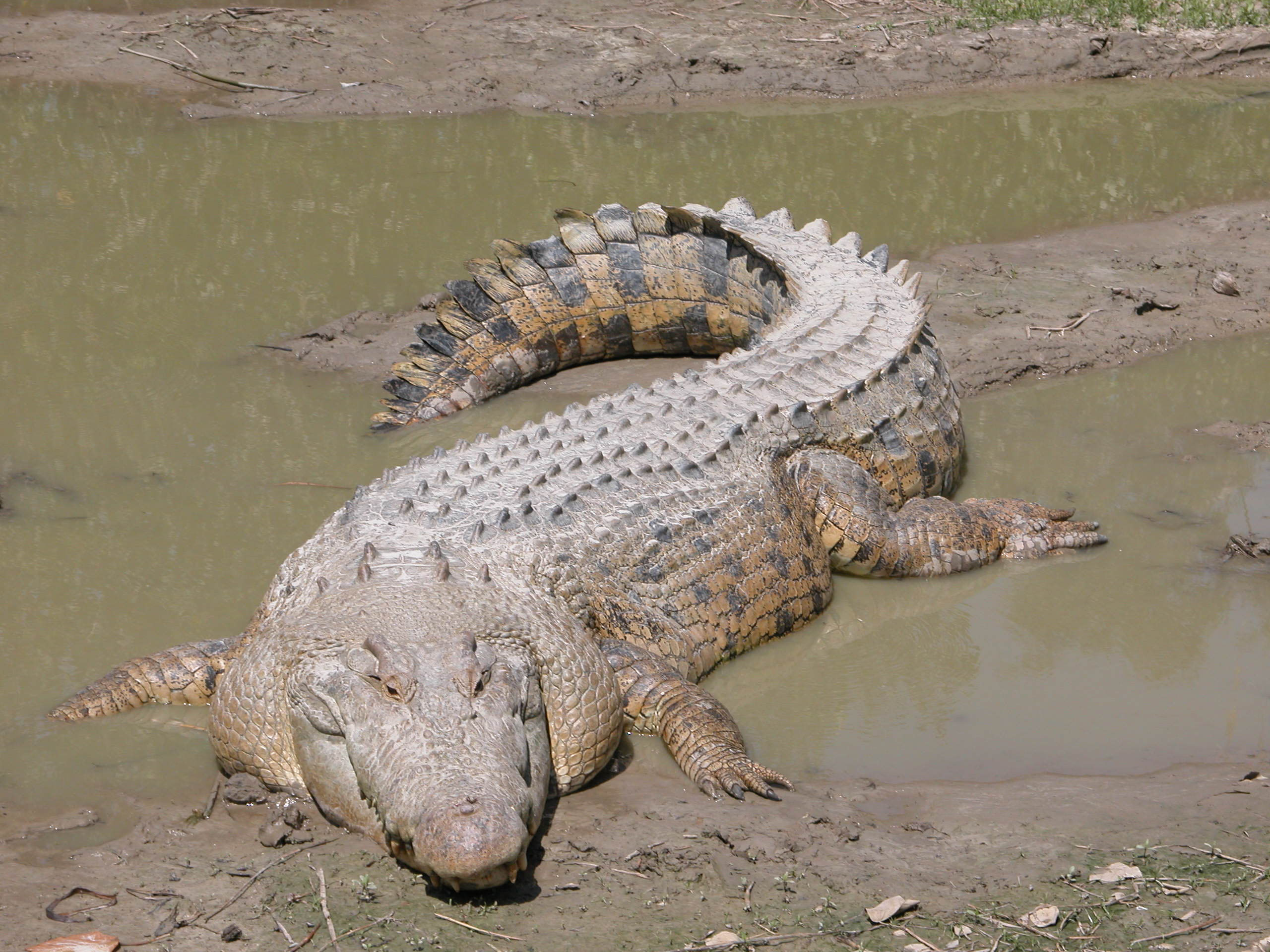
The saltwater crocodile is the largest species of crocodile in the world.

Australia has two species of crocodile. The saltwater crocodile, known colloquially as the "salty", is the largest living crocodile species; reaching over 7 m, and weighing over 1,000 kg, they can and do kill people. They live on the coast and in the freshwater rivers and wetlands of northern Australia, and they are farmed for their meat and leather. Freshwater crocodiles, found only in northern Australia, are not considered dangerous to humans.

The Australian coast is visited by six species of sea turtle: the flatback, green, hawksbill, olive ridley, loggerhead and the leatherback sea turtles; all are protected in Australian waters. There are 35 species of Australian freshwater turtles from eight genera of the family Chelidae. The pig-nosed turtle is the only Australian turtle not of that family. Australia is the only continent without any living species of land tortoises of the Testudinoidea superfamily besides Antarctica.

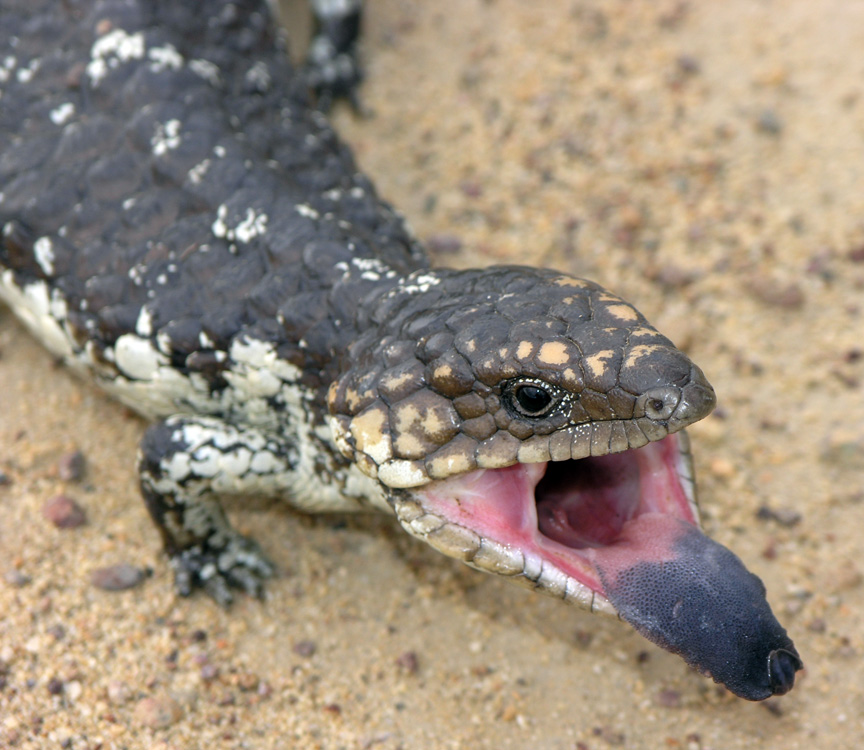
Blue-tongued lizards are amongst the largest species of skink.

Australia is the only continent where venomous snakes outnumber their non-venomous cousins. Australian snakes belong to seven families. Of these, the most venomous species, including the fierce snake, eastern brown snake, taipan and eastern tiger snake are from the family Elapidae. Of the 200 species of elapid, 106 are found in Australia and 86 are found only in Australia. Thirty-three sea snakes from family Hydrophiidae inhabit Australia's northern waters; many are extremely venomous. Two species of sea snake from the Acrochordidae also occur in Australian waters. Australia has only 11 species from the world's most significant snake family Colubridae; none are endemic, and they are considered to be relatively recent arrivals from Asia. There are 15 python species and 45 species of insectivorous blind snake.

There are more species of snake in Darwin than any other Australian state capital, with 34 non-marine snake species found in the region, of which 23 have been recorded by professional snake catchers in Darwin itself. Fortunately for the citizens of Darwin, a far smaller proportion of these snakes are highly venomous than is typically found in other cities, due to the low numbers of front-fanged elapid species and dominance of relatively harmless pythons and colubrid species.

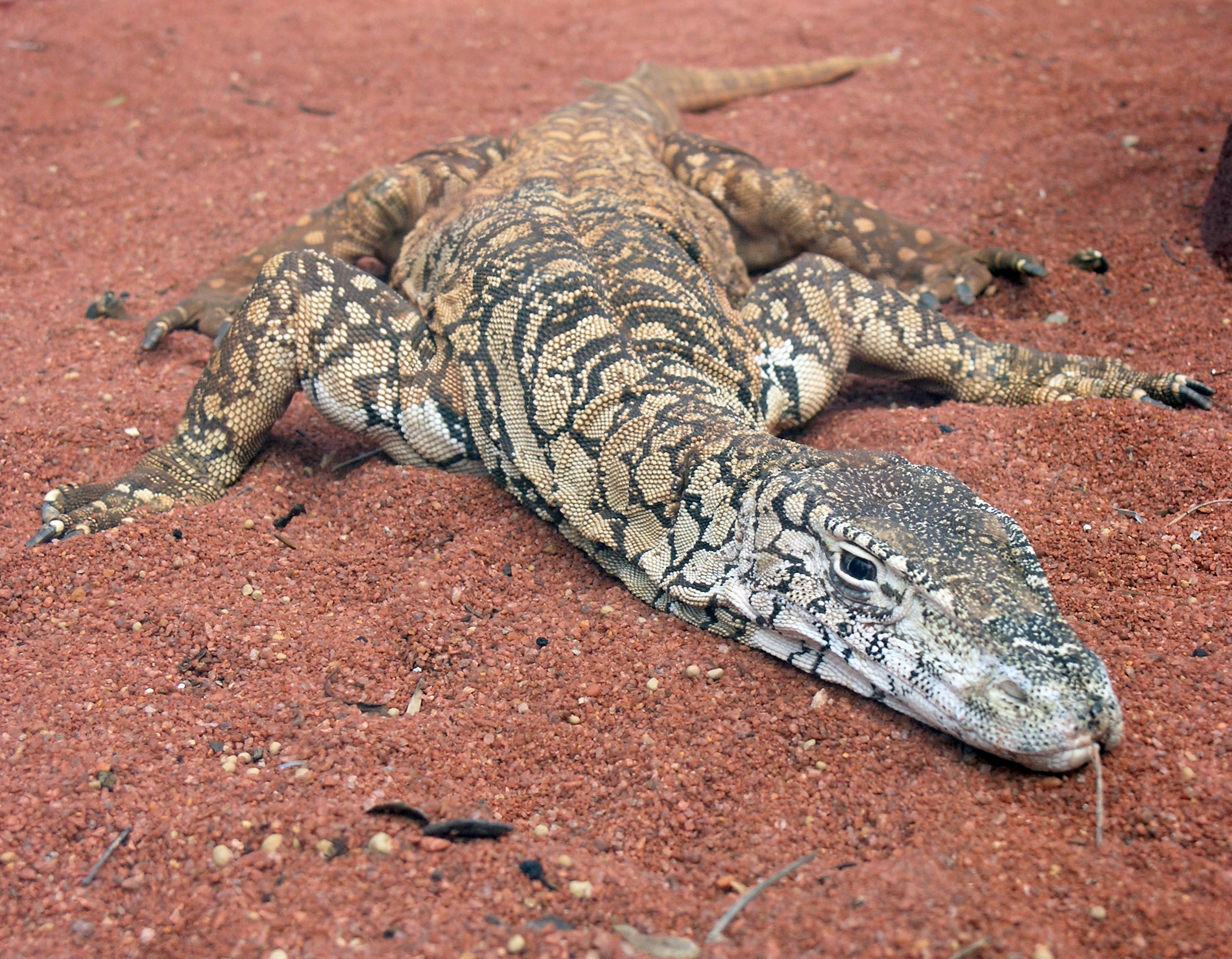
There are 30 species of goanna in Australia.

There are more than 700 species of lizards in Australia with representatives of five families. There are over 130 species in 20 genera of gecko found throughout the Australian continent. The Pygopodidae is a family of limbless lizards endemic to the Australian region; all 39 species from seven genera occur in Australia. The Agamidae or dragon lizards are represented by 70 species in 14 genera, including the thorny devil, bearded dragon and frill-necked lizard. There are 30 species of monitor lizard, family Varanidae, in Australia, where they are commonly known as goannas. The largest Australian monitor is the perentie, which can reach up to 2 m in length. There are about 450 species of skink from more than 40 genera, comprising more than 50% of the total Australian lizard fauna; this group includes the blue-tongued lizards.

== Fish ==
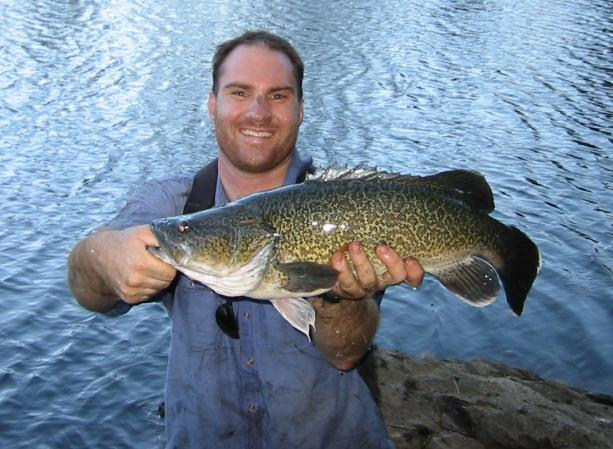
The Murray cod is Australia's largest wholly freshwater bony fish.

More than 5,000 species of fish inhabit Australia's waterways; of these, 24% are endemic. However, because of the relative scarcity of freshwater waterways, Australia has only about 300 species of freshwater fish. Two families of freshwater fish have ancient origins: the arowana or bonytongues, and the Queensland lungfish. The Queensland lungfish is the most primitive of the lungfish, having evolved before Australia separated from Gondwana. One of the smallest freshwater fish, peculiar to the southwest of Western Australia, is the salamanderfish, which can survive desiccation in the dry season by burrowing into mud. Other families with a potentially Gondwanan origin include the Retropinnidae, Galaxiidae, Aplochitonidae and Percichthyidae. Apart from the ancient freshwater species, 70% of Australia's freshwater fish have affinities with tropical Indo-Pacific marine species that have adapted to freshwater. These species include freshwater lampreys, Herrings, catfish, rainbowfish, and some 50 species of gudgeon, including the sleepy cod. Native freshwater game fish include the barramundi, Murray cod, and golden perch. Two species of endangered freshwater shark are found in the Northern Territory including the northern river shark (Glyphis garricki) and the speartooth shark (Glyphis glyphis).

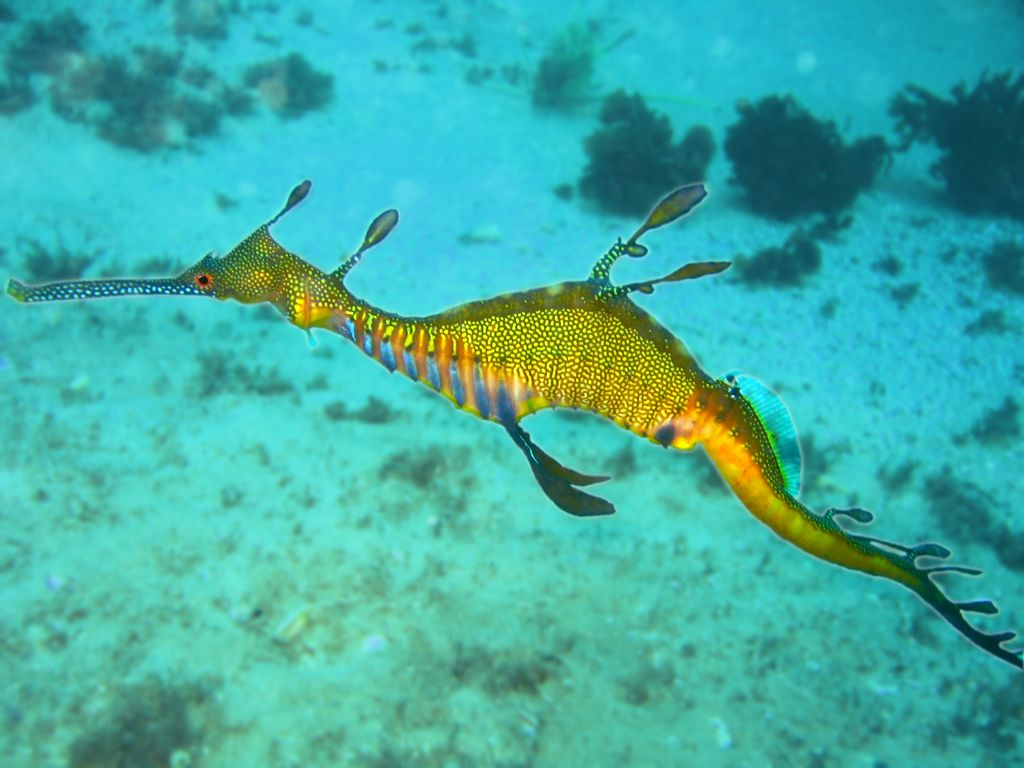
The weedy sea dragon, a fish related to pipefish and seahorses, is found in the waters around southern Australia.

Several exotic freshwater fish species, including brown, brook and rainbow trout, Atlantic and Chinook salmon, redfin perch, common carp, and mosquitofish, have been introduced to Australian waterways. The mosquitofish is a particularly aggressive species known for harassing and nipping the fins of other fish. It has been linked to declines and localised extirpations of several small native fish species. The introduced trout species have had serious negative impacts on a number of upland native fish species including trout cod, Macquarie perch and mountain galaxias species as well as other upland fauna such as the spotted tree frog. The common carp is strongly implicated in the dramatic loss in waterweed, decline of small native fish species and permanently elevated levels of turbidity in the Murray-Darling Basin of south west Australia.

Most of Australia's fish species are marine, and 75% live in tropical marine environments. This is partly due to Australia's huge marine territory, covering 9 million km^{2}. Groups of interest include the moray eels and squirrelfish, as well as the pipefish and seahorses, whose males incubate their partner's eggs in a specialised pouch. There are 80 species of grouper in Australian waters, including one of the world's biggest bony fish, the giant grouper, which can grow as large as 2.7 m and weigh up to 400 kg. The trevally, a group of 50 species of silver schooling fish, and the snappers are popular species for commercial fishing. The Great Barrier Reef supports a huge variety of small- and medium-sized reef fish, including the damselfish, butterflyfish, angelfish, gobies, cardinalfish, wrassees, triggerfish and surgeonfish. There are several venomous fish, among them several species of stonefish and pufferfish and the red lionfish, all of which have toxins that can kill humans. There are 11 venomous species of stingray, the largest of which is the smooth stingray. The barracudas are one of the reef's largest species. However, large reef fish should not be eaten for fear of ciguatera poisoning.

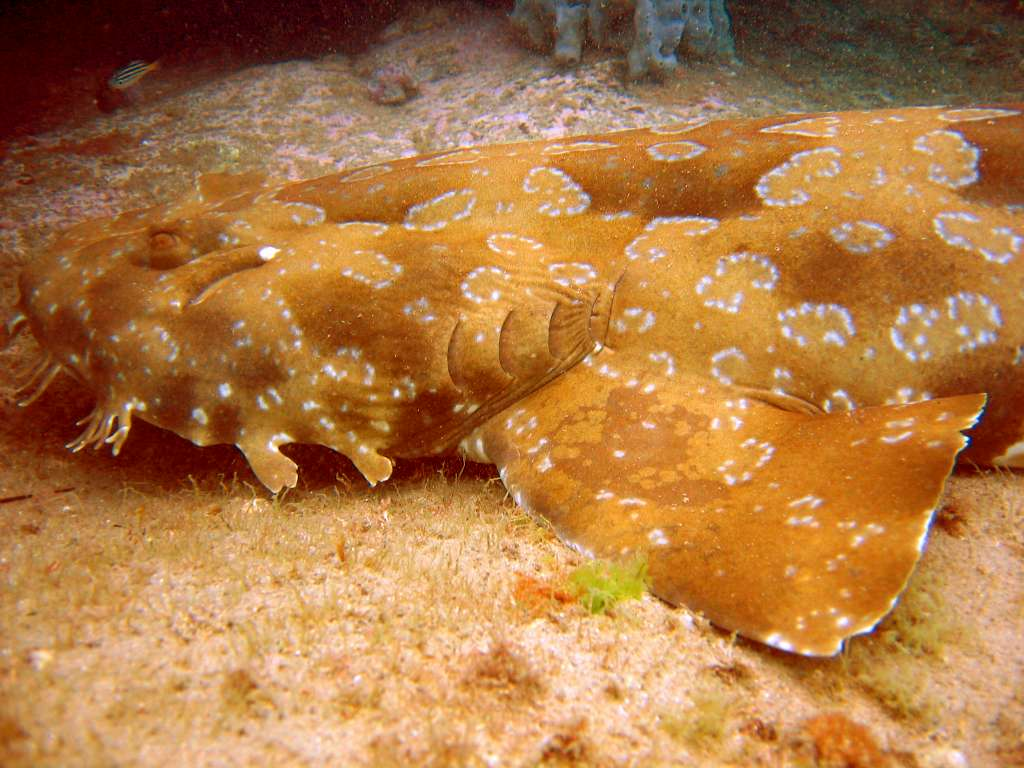
The spotted wobbegong is the largest wobbegong shark, reaching a length of around 3 m

Sharks inhabit all the coastal waters and estuarine habitats of Australia's coast. There are 166 species, including 30 species of requiem shark, 32 of catshark, six of wobbegong shark, and 40 of dogfish shark. There are three species from the family Heterodontidae: the Port Jackson shark, the zebra bullhead shark and the crested bullhead shark. In 2004, there were 12 unprovoked shark attacks in Australia, of which two were fatal. Only 3 species of shark pose a significant threat to humans: the bull shark, the tiger shark and the great white shark.

Some popular beaches in Queensland and New South Wales are protected by shark netting, a method that has reduced the population of both dangerous and harmless shark species through accidental entanglement. The overfishing of sharks has also significantly reduced shark numbers in Australian waters, and several species are now endangered. A megamouth shark was found on a Perth beach in 1988; very little is known about this species, but this discovery may indicate the presence of the species in Australian coastal waters.

== Invertebrates ==
Taxonomic group	Estimated number of species described	Estimated total number of species in Australia
Porifera	1,476	~3,500
Cnidaria	1,705	~2,200
Platyhelminthes	1,593	~10,000
Acanthocephala	56	~160
Nematoda	~2,060	~30,000
Mollusca	~8,700	~12,250
Annelida	2,192	~4,230
Onychophora	71	~80
Crustacea	7,266	~9,500
Arachnida	6,615	~31,338
Insecta	~62,000	~205,000
Echinodermata	1,475	~2,000
Other invertebrates	~2,371	~5,015
Modified from: Williams et al. 2001 and Chapman, 2009

Of the estimated 200,000 animal species in Australia, about 96% are invertebrates. While the full extent of invertebrate diversity is uncertain, 90% of insects and molluscs are considered endemic. Invertebrates occupy many ecological niches and are important in all ecosystems as decomposers, pollinators, and food sources.

The largest group of invertebrates are insects, comprising 75% of Australia's known species of animals. The most diverse insect orders are the Coleoptera, with 28,200 species of beetles and weevils, the Lepidoptera with 20,816 species including butterflies and moths, and around 14,800 species of Hymenoptera, including the ants, bees and wasps. Order Diptera, which includes the flies and mosquitoes, comprises 7,786 species.

Order Hemiptera, including bugs, aphids and hoppers, comprises 5,650 species; and there are 2,827 species of order Orthoptera, including grasshoppers, crickets and katydids. Introduced species that pose a significant threat to native species include the European wasp, the red fire ant, the yellow crazy ant and feral honeybees which compete with native bees.

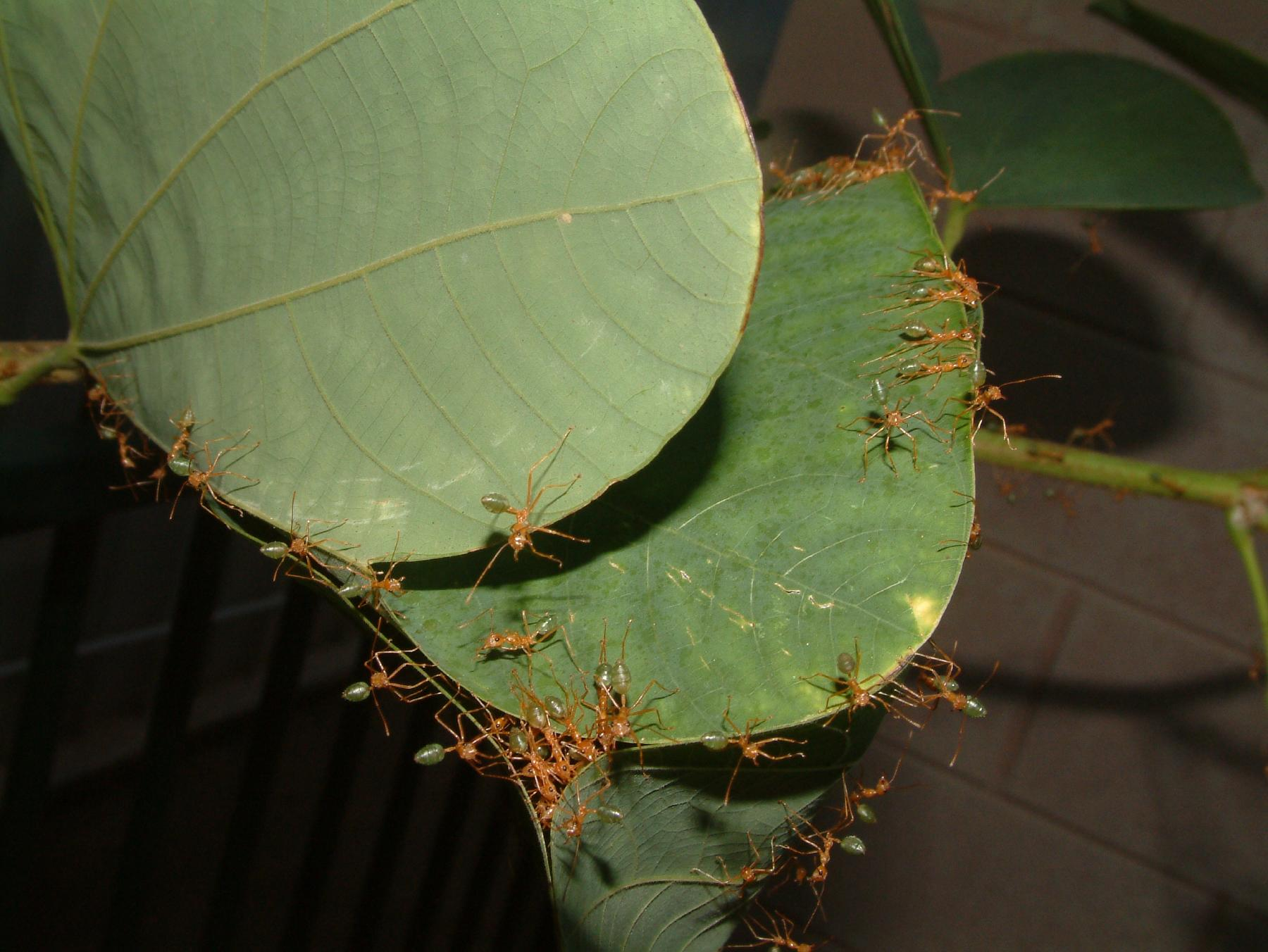
There are 1,275 described species and subspecies of ant from Australia. These green ants (Oecophylla smaragdina) are found in tropical Australia and build nests in leaves.

Australia has a wide variety of arachnids, including 78 spider families with 79 species of spider familiar enough to have common names. There are numerous highly venomous species, including the notorious Sydney funnel-web and allied mygalomorphs, whose bites can be deadly.

The redback spider was thought to be deadly but their bites are no longer thought to be life-threatening, as the lack of deaths since 1956 was thought to be due to the development of an anti-venom which has since been shown to be no better than placebo. There are thousands of species of mites and ticks from the subclass Acari. Australia also has at least 150 species of pseudoscorpion with an estimated 550 more waiting to be described, and at least 17 scorpion genera with 120 species.

In the Annelida (sub)class Oligochaeta, there are many families of aquatic worms, and for native terrestrial worms: the Enchytraeidae (pot worms) and the "true" earthworms in families Acanthodrilidae, Octochaetidae and Megascolecidae. The latter includes the world's largest earthworm, the giant Gippsland earthworm, found only in Gippsland, Victoria. On average they reach 80 cm in length, but specimens up to 3.7 m in length have been found.

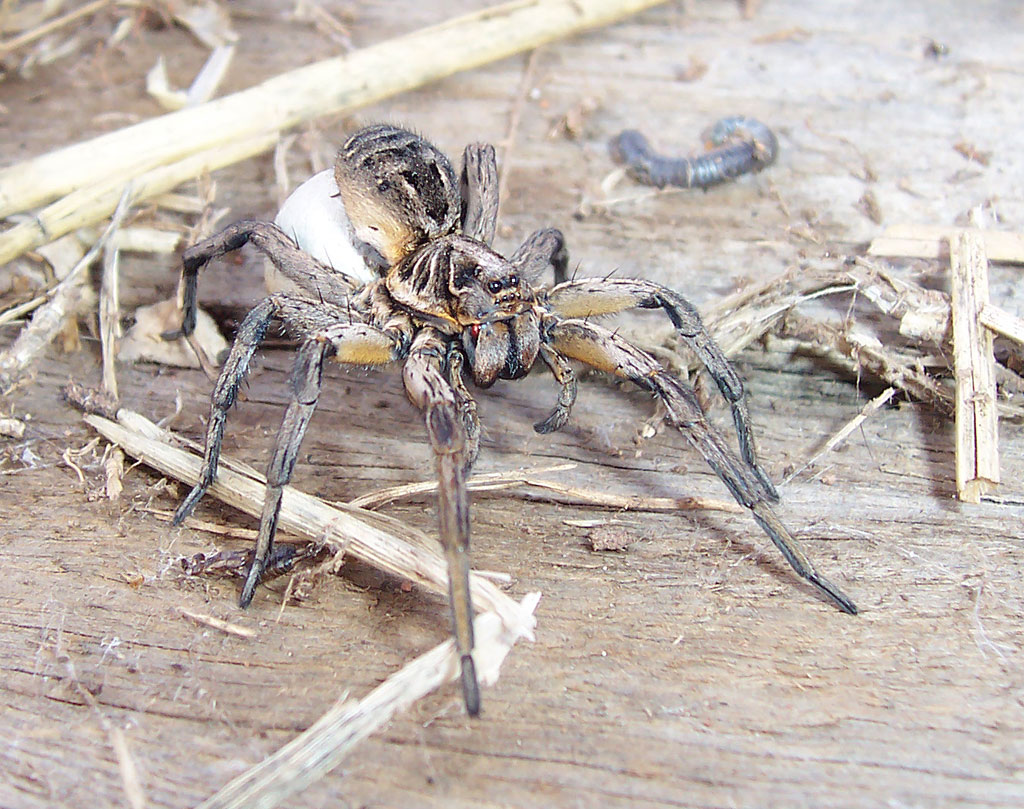
The wolf spider, Lycosa godeffroyi, is common in many areas of Australia. In this family of spiders, the female carries her egg-sac.

The large family Parastacidae includes over 180 species of Australian freshwater crayfish. These include the world's smallest crayfish, the swamp crayfish, which does not exceed 30 mm in length, and the world's largest crayfish, the Tasmanian giant freshwater crayfish, measuring up to 76 cm long and weighing 4.5 kg. The crayfish genus Cherax includes the common yabby, in addition to the farmed species marron and Queensland red claw.

Species from the genus Engaeus, commonly known as the land crayfish, are also found in Australia. Engaeus species are not entirely aquatic, because they spend most of their lives living in burrows. Australia has seven species of freshwater crab from the genus Austrothelphusa. These crabs live burrowed into the banks of waterways and can plug their burrows, surviving through several years of drought. The extremely primitive freshwater mountain shrimp, found only in Tasmania, are a unique group, resembling species found in the fossil record from 200 MYA.

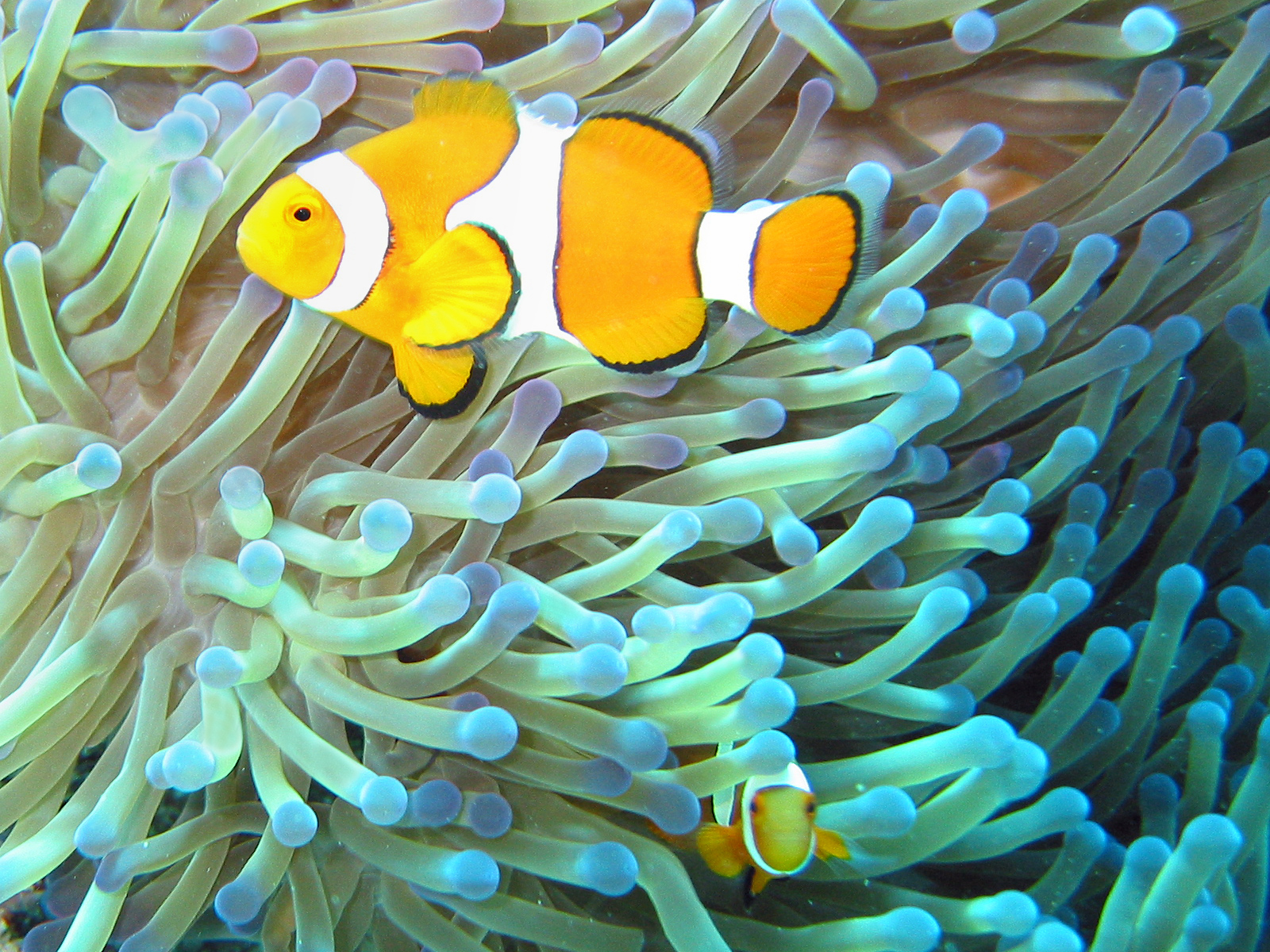
A magnificent sea anemone on the Great Barrier Reef, with an ocellaris clownfish.

A huge variety of marine invertebrates are found in Australian waters, with the Great Barrier Reef an important source of this diversity. Families include the Porifera or sea sponges, the Cnidaria (includes the jellyfish, corals and sea anemones, comb jellies), the Echinodermata (includes the sea urchins, sea stars, brittle stars, sea cucumbers, the lamp shells) and the Mollusca (includes snails, slugs, limpets, squid, octopus, cockles, oysters, clams, and chitons).

Venomous invertebrates include the box jellyfish, the blue-ringed octopus, and ten species of cone snail, which can cause respiratory failure and death in humans. The crown-of-thorns starfish usually inhabits the reef at low densities. Under conditions that are not yet well understood, they can reproduce to reach an unsustainable population density when coral is devoured at a rate faster than it can regenerate. This presents a serious reef management issue.

Other problematic marine invertebrates include the native species purple sea urchin and the white urchin, which have been able to take over marine habitats and form urchin barrens due to the over harvesting of their natural predators which include abalone and rock lobster. Introduced invertebrate pests include the Asian mussel, New Zealand green-lipped mussel, black-striped mussel and the northern Pacific seastar, all of which displace native shellfish.

There are many unique marine crustaceans in Australian waters. The best-known class, to which all the edible species of crustacean belong, is Malacostraca. The warm waters of northern Australia are home to many species of decapod crustaceans, including crabs, false crabs, hermit crabs, lobsters, shrimps, and prawns. The peracarids, including the amphipods and isopods, are more diverse in the colder waters of southern Australia.

Less-well-known marine groups include the classes Remipedia, Cephalocarida, Branchiopoda, Maxillopoda (which includes the barnacles, copepods and fish lice), and the Ostracoda. Notable species include the Tasmanian giant crab, the second largest crab species in the world, found in deep water, and weighing up to 13 kg, and the Australian spiny lobsters, such as the western rock lobster, which are distinct from other lobster species as they do not have claws.

== Invasive species ==
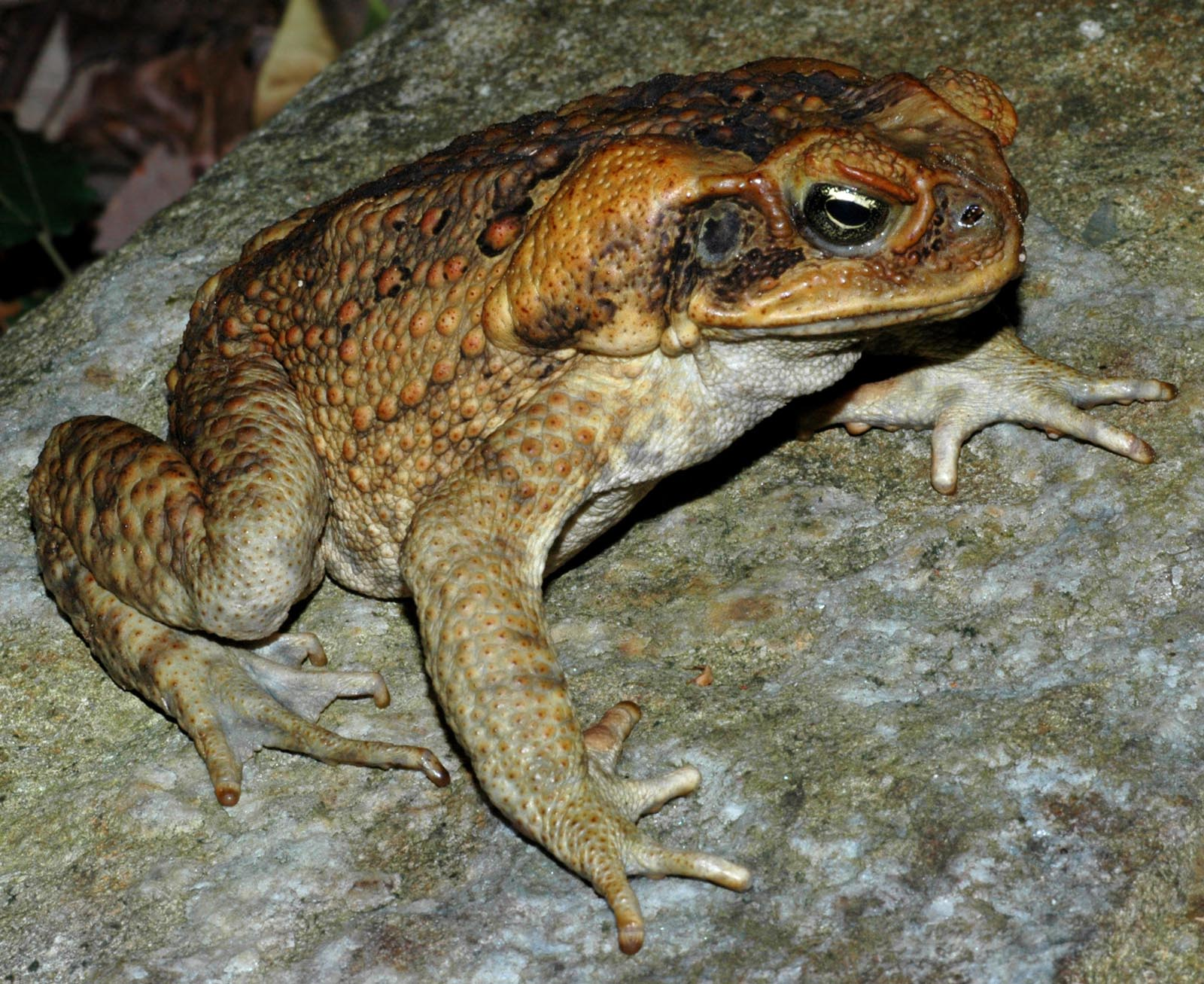
The poisonous cane toad

Introduction of exotic fauna in Australia by design, accident and natural processes has led to a considerable number of invasive, feral and pest species which have flourished and now impact the environment adversely. Introduced organisms affect the environment in a number of ways. European rabbits render land economically useless by eating everything. Red foxes affect local endemic fauna by predation while the cane toad poisons the predators by being eaten.

Some water fleas may have been introduced to Australia by humans or birds. Other invasive species include birds (Indian mynah), fish (common carp), insects (red imported fire ant), molluscs (Asian mussel). The problem is compounded by invasive exotic flora as well as introduced diseases, fungi and parasites. An example of this is Blue Green Algae, which is spreading through many bodies of water in rural Victoria, such as the Gippsland Lakes.

Costly, laborious and time-consuming efforts at control of these species has met with little success and this continues to be a major problem area in the conservation of Australia's biodiversity.

Many of the introduced species are not regulated through wildlife services and can be regularly hunted year round. Some states even fund hunting initiatives though the efficacy of these programs are disputed.

According to a 2023 report co-authored by biologist Tim Low, invasive species are the leading cause of native Australian animal extinctions since the 1960s.

== Human impact and conservation ==
For at least 40,000 years, Australia's fauna played an integral role in the traditional lifestyles of Indigenous Australians, who relied upon many species as a source of food and skins. Vertebrates commonly harvested included macropods, possums, seals, fish and the short-tailed shearwater, most commonly known as the muttonbird. Invertebrates used as food included insects such as the bogong moth and larvae collectively called witchetty grubs and molluscs. The use of fire-stick farming, in which large swathes of bushland were burnt to facilitate hunting, modified both flora and fauna – and are thought to have contributed to the extinction of large herbivores with a specialised diet, such as the flightless birds from the genus Genyornis. The role of hunting and landscape modification by aboriginal people in the extinction of the Australian megafauna is debated, but increasingly favours the idea that humans were responsible for megafaunal extinction.

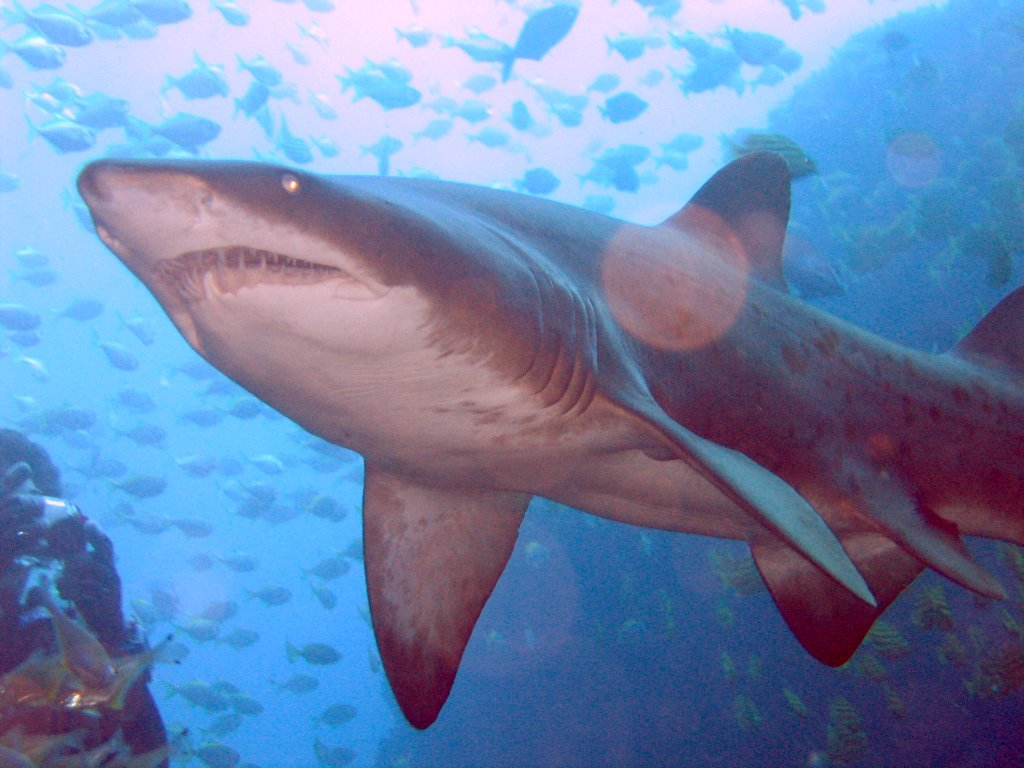
The grey nurse shark is critically endangered on the Australian east coast.

Despite the major impact of Aboriginals on native species populations, this is considered to be less significant than that of the European settlers, whose impact on the landscape has been on a relatively large scale. Since European settlement, direct exploitation of native fauna, habitat destruction and the introduction of exotic predators and competitive herbivores has led to the extinction of some 27 mammal, 23 bird and 4 frog species. Much of Australia's fauna is protected by legislation.

The federal Environment Protection and Biodiversity Conservation Act 1999 was created to meet Australia's obligations as a signatory to the 1992 Convention on Biological Diversity. This act protects all native fauna and provides for the identification and protection of threatened species. In each state and territory, there is statutory listing of threatened species. At present, 380 animal species are classified as either endangered or threatened under the EPBC Act, and other species are protected under state and territory legislation. More broadly, a complete cataloguing of all the species within Australia has been undertaken, a key step in the conservation of Australian fauna and biodiversity.

In 1973, the federal government established the Australian Biological Resources Study (ABRS), which coordinates research in the taxonomy, identification, classification and distribution of flora and fauna. The ABRS maintains free online databases cataloguing much of the described Australian flora and fauna. Impacts such as the illegal setting of traps in rivers affect animals such as the Australian platypus, along with lack of awareness each year an average of 2–5 Australians lose their lives to what is presumed a safe creature. The key is understanding of Australia's diverse wildlife and fauna; what seems safe is often deadly.

The Australian Wildlife Conservancy is the largest private owner of land for conservation in the country which is dedicated to protecting endangered species across 4.8 million hectares of land in the most popular regions such as the Kimberley, Cape York, Lake Eyre and the Top End. This not-for-profit organisation is working hard to avoid extinction of the endangered native species in various wildlife sanctuaries.

Australia is a member of the International Whaling Commission and is strongly opposed to commercial whaling — all cetacean species are protected in Australian waters. Australia is also a signatory to the CITES agreement and prohibits the export of endangered species. Protected areas have been created in every state and territory to protect and preserve the country's unique ecosystems. These protected areas include national parks and other reserves, as well as 64 wetlands registered under the Ramsar Convention and 16 World Heritage Sites. As of 2002, 10.8% (774,619.51 km^{2}) of the total land area of Australia is within protected areas.

Protected marine zones have been created in many areas to preserve marine biodiversity; as of 2002, these areas cover about 7% (646,000 km^{2}) of Australia's marine jurisdiction. The Great Barrier Reef is managed by the Great Barrier Reef Marine Park Authority under specific federal and state legislation. Some of Australia's fisheries are already overexploited, and quotas have been set for the sustainable harvest of many marine species.

The State of the Environment Report, 2001, prepared by independent researchers for the federal government, concluded that the condition of the environment and environmental management in Australia had worsened since the previous report in 1996. Of particular relevance to wildlife conservation, the report indicated that many processes — such as salinity, changing hydrological conditions, land clearing, fragmentation of ecosystems, poor management of the coastal environment, and invasive species — pose major problems for protecting Australia's biodiversity.

== See also ==
- List of mammals of Australia
  - List of monotremes and marsupials of Australia
  - List of bats of Australia
  - List of rodents of Australia
  - List of placental mammals introduced to Australia
  - List of marine mammals of Australia
- List of birds of Australia
  - List of birds of Australia, New Zealand and Antarctica
  - Birds of Australia#Regional lists
- List of ants of Australia
- List of butterflies of Australia
- List of moths of Australia
- List of stick insects and mantids of Australia
- List of Dermapterans of Australia
- List of common spider species of Australia
- List of Australia-New Guinea species extinct in the Holocene
- List of introduced fish in Australia
- Threatened fauna of Australia
- List of Australia-New Guinea species extinct in the Holocene
- List of marine animals of Australia (temperate waters)
- Environmental issues in Australia
