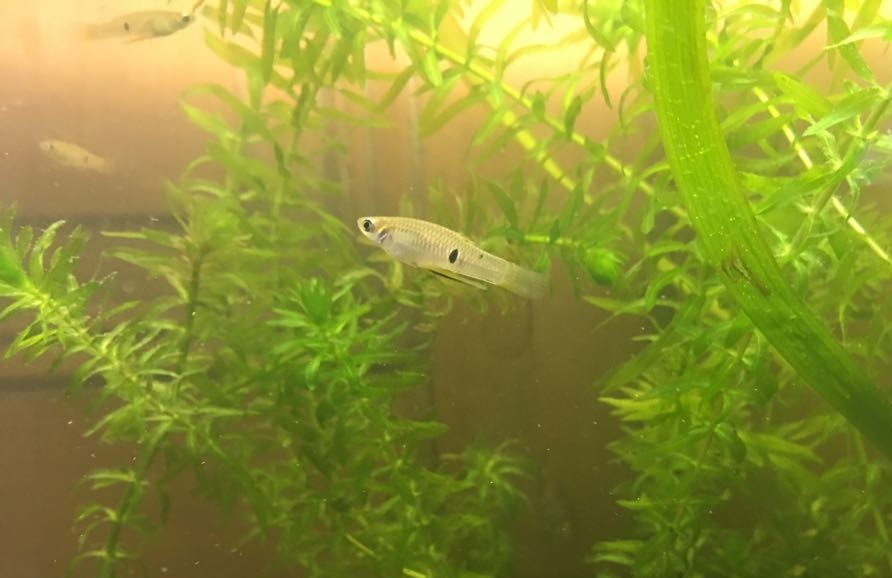
- The species' wild colors
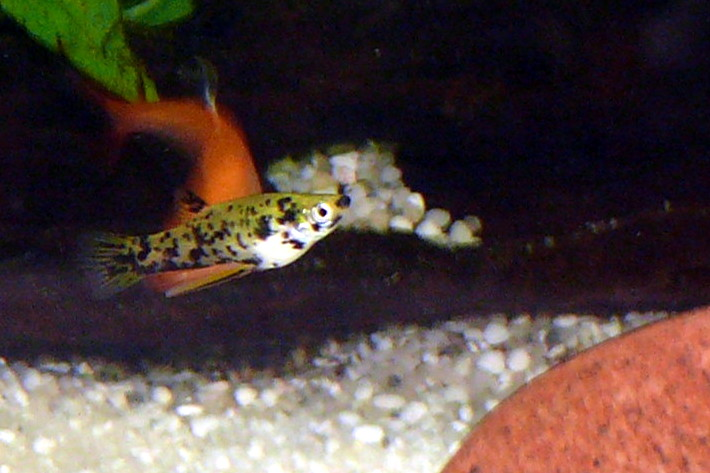
- "Speckled Kaudi" morph in aquarium

Conservation status
- Least Concern (IUCN 3.1)

Scientific classification
- Kingdom: Animalia
- Phylum: Chordata
- Class: Actinopterygii
- Order: Cyprinodontiformes
- Family: Poeciliidae
- Genus: Phalloceros
- Species: P. caudimaculatus

Binomial name
- Phalloceros caudimaculatus (R. F. Hensel, 1868)

Synonyms
- Girardinus caudimaculatus Hensel, 1868

= Dusky millions fish =

Species of fish

The dusky millions fish, (Phalloceros caudimaculatus), also known as the caudo, the leopardfish or the one-spot livebearer, is a species of fish native eastern and southern Brazil, northern Argentina, Uruguay and Paraguay. It has also been introduced to Australia, Malawi and New Zealand; primarily for mosquito control, but also as escapees from the aquarium trade. It has been reported as having adverse ecological effects in areas where it has been introduced. The females of this species grow to a total length of 6 centimetres (2.4 in), while males remain smaller.

== Origins ==
This species originated in South America. It is mainly a freshwater fish and thrives best in areas with weak water flow. However, it is extremely adaptable and can thrive in a multitude of altered environments. For example, although it prefers temperatures between 16 and 22 °C (61–72 °F), it can survive up to 30 °C (86 °F) and down to 5 °C (41 °F). The species also has a high fecundity.

The dusky millions fish was one of the first species in its family, the Poeciliidae to be bred for aquarium usage. Ecologists also attempted to use the fish as a mosquito control; however, the dusky millions fish's diverse diet affected its efficacy as a control species since the fish can eat a range of different organisms, including algae.

== Role as an invasive species ==
The dusky millions fish was introduced to a variety of ecosystems both by aquarium keepers and as mosquito pest control. The NSW area of Australia has been affected the most by its presence. It reproduces and spreads well in the winter when there is a larger flow of water. Australian ecologists have tried to contain this spread by killing them with rotenone; however, the infestation persists. This species is most likely to be found in shallow areas with varying levels of vegetation, such as local ponds.

The ecological impact of the dusky millions fish in Australia is pronounced. Its diet has affected populations of both native and non-native fish. An example would be the non-native species Gambusia holbrooki. It has similar features as the dusky millions fish, such as a high reproductive rate and use for mosquito control. However, its population in Australia has diminished since the introduction of the dusky millions fish. Furthermore, this dusky millions fish has also affected the food chain, as they have become prey for native bird species.
