= Corroboree frog =

Corroboree frogs (/kəˈrɒbəri/ kuh-ROB-uh-ree) comprise two species of frog native to the Southern Tablelands of New South Wales in Australia. They are:

- Southern corroboree frog (Pseudophryne corroboree)
- Northern corroboree frog (Pseudophryne pengilleyi)
