= Kōkopu =

Common name used for three species of fish of the genus Galaxias

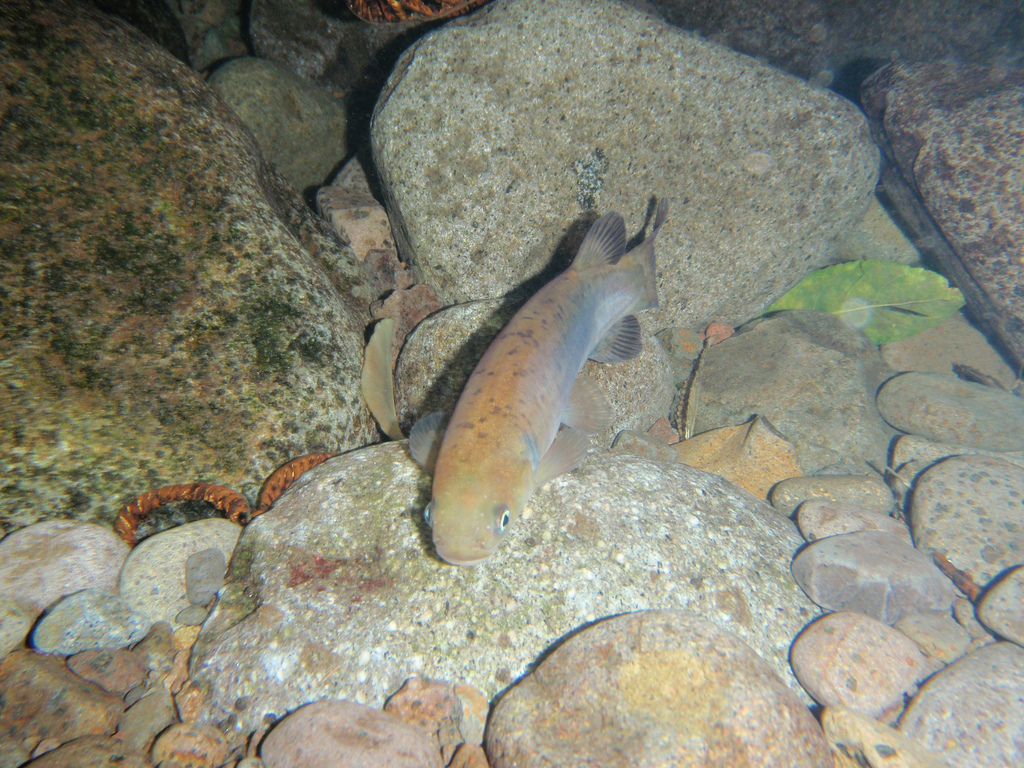
Shortjaw kokopu, Galaxias postvectis

Kokopu (Māori: kōkopu) is a common name used for three species of ray-finned fish of the genus Galaxias. They are found in the rivers, lakes and swamps of New Zealand, to which they are endemic. Kokopu are galaxiids and like others members of that family lacks scales and has a thick, leathery skin covered with mucus. Kokopu inhabit streams with plenty of cover (e.g. logs and overhanging boulders) but can also be found in swamps and larger waterways. They mostly feed on invertebrates that live in the stream beds but also eat insects that fall into the water and will move into the open at night for feeding.

There are three known species of Kokopu in New Zealand:

- Giant kōkopu, Galaxias argenteus
- Banded kōkopu, Galaxias fasciatus
- Shortjaw kōkopu, Galaxias postvectis

Kokopu live for between 5 and 10 years but can reach in excess of 21 years. They spawn in leaf debris in stream beds or during spring tides and the eggs hatch about 30 days after being laid. The hatchlings are carried downstream where they spend a short period of time in the sea and return to streams after four to five months. Kokopu sprats are keenly sought by fishers as whitebait for consumption as a delicacy and are caught in fine meshed nets.

Kokopu depend on the natural environment, principally in forested environments, and so have become less common as New Zealand has been cleared of much of its native forest and swampland as a result of colonisation and farming development since the late 19th century. Nevertheless, recognition of the value of biodiversity and the preservation of natural areas in National Parks and reserved conservation areas promises to maintain the species.

Kokopu suffer from the introduction of trout species that were introduced into New Zealand for sport fishing purposes during the first half of the 20th century by various acclimatisation societies. Research has indicated that where trout have become established then kokopu are unlikely to be found. Nevertheless, since the kokopu, on average, is smaller in size than trout then where stream and swamp environments cannot support trout and are still in forested areas, kokopu are likely to be found.
