= Flathead galaxias =

Flathead galaxias is a common name for several fish and may refer to:

- Galaxias depressiceps, native to New Zealand
- Galaxias rostratus, native to Australia
