= Swan galaxias =

Swan galaxias is a name for two species of fish in Australia:

- Galaxias fontanus, found in Tasmania
- Galaxiella munda, found in southwest Australia
