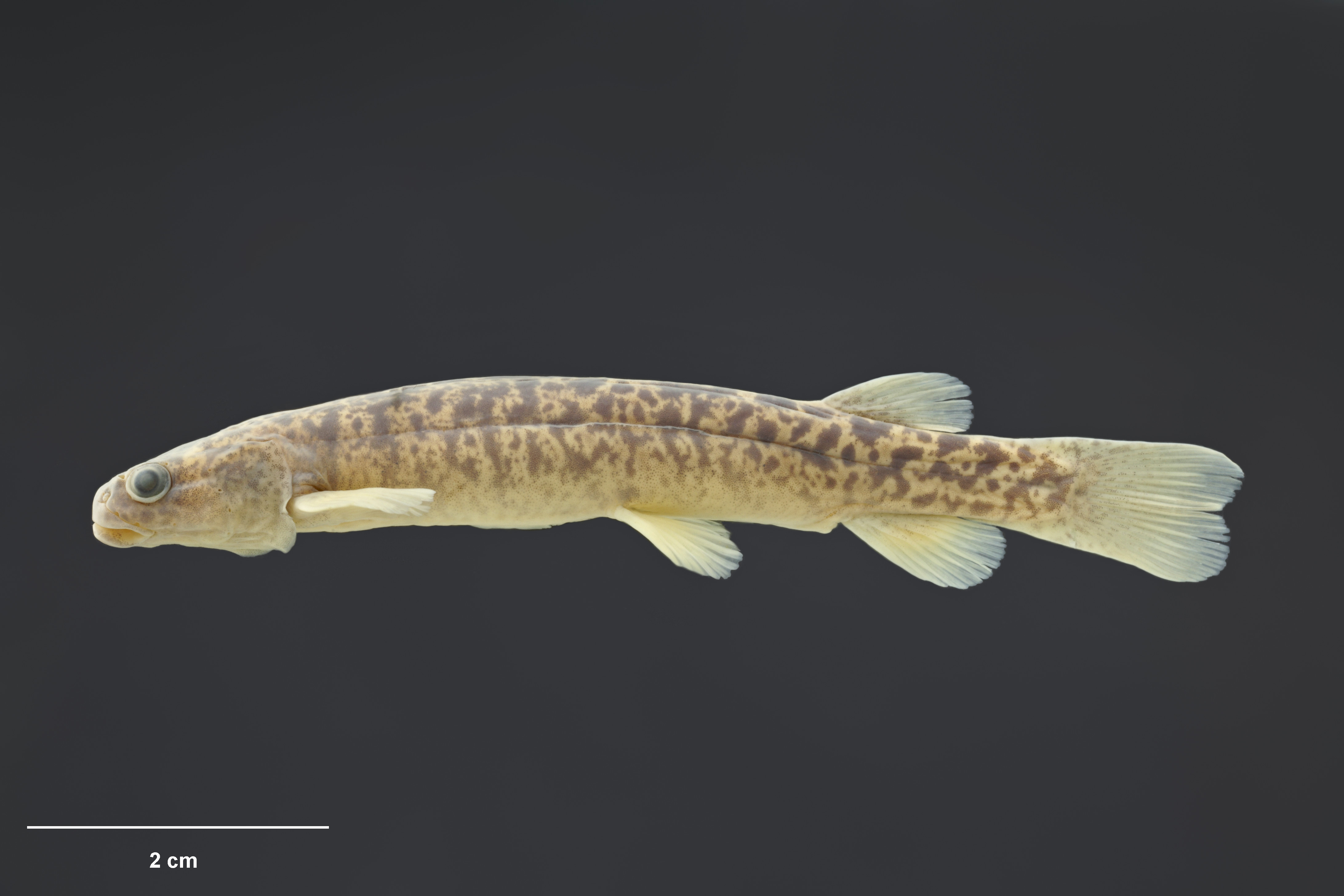
- Type specimen from the collections of Te Papa

Conservation status
- Vulnerable (IUCN 3.1)

Scientific classification
- Kingdom: Animalia
- Phylum: Chordata
- Class: Actinopterygii
- Order: Galaxiiformes
- Family: Galaxiidae
- Genus: Galaxias
- Species: G. depressiceps

Binomial name
- Galaxias depressiceps McDowall & Wallis, 1996
- Approximate known distribution (in orange) of Galaxias depressiceps on a map of the South Island

= Flathead galaxias (New Zealand) =

Species of ray-finned fish

Galaxias depressiceps is a galaxiid of the genus Galaxias, found primarily in the Taieri River catchment in Otago, New Zealand. It is commonly known as the flathead galaxias, but should not be confused with Galaxias rostratus, an Australian galaxiid with the same common name.
