= Tōrere River =

- Route of the Tōrere River
- Mouth of the Tōrere River Tōrere River (North Island)

Location
- Country: New Zealand

Physical characteristics
- Source: Confluence of the Mahero Stream and an unnamed stream
  - coordinates: 38°00′07″S 177°34′34″E
- Mouth
  - location: Bay of Plenty
  - coordinates: 37°57′06″S 177°29′00″E
- Length: 15 km (9.3 mi)

Basin features
- Progression: Tōrere River → Bay of Plenty → Pacific Ocean
- Tributaries
  - right: Makomako Stream, Waiiti Stream
- Bridges: Tōrere Tributary Stream Bridge

The Tōrere River is a river of the eastern Bay of Plenty Region of New Zealand's North Island. It flows northwest from its sources within Raukumara Forest Park to reach the Bay of Plenty 30 kilometres (19 mi) southwest of Te Kaha. It is also known to the local Ngaitai tribe as Wainui or Large River.

== Usage ==
The Tōrere River plays a significant role in the daily lives of the people that live in the area providing water for crop irrigation and stock. In addition to this it also plays a significant role in providing indigenous food staples such as eels, whitebait, and kokopu and introduced species such as brown trout and rainbow trout.

The Ngaitai tribe cite the river in their historical records.

- Ko Kapuārangi te maunga (Kapuārangi is the mountain)
- Ko Wainui te awa (Wainui is the river)
- Ko Tainui te waka (Tainui is the canoe)
- Ko Hoturoa te tangata (Hoturoa is the man)
- Ko Torerenuiarua te whare tipuna (Torerenuiārua is the ancestral dwelling)
- Ko Manaakiao te whare rangatira e whangaitia ana (Manaakiao is the chiefly dwelling)
- Ko Ngaitai te iwi (Ngaitai is the tribe)

== See also ==
- List of rivers of New Zealand
