= Aplochitoninae =

Scientific classification
- Kingdom: Animalia
- Phylum: Chordata
- Class: Actinopterygii
- Division: Teleostei
- Order: Galaxiiformes
- Family: Galaxiidae
- Subfamily: Aplochitoninae; Günther, 1864

Genera
- Aplochiton Jenyns, 1842; Lovettia McCulloch, 1915

Subfamily of ray-finned fishes

The Aplochitoninae, formerly the family Aplochitonidae, are a subfamily of ray-finned fish that are found in the western Pacific and Indian Ocean, mostly in the Indonesian and Australian regions. They are also commonly known as the velvetfishes.
