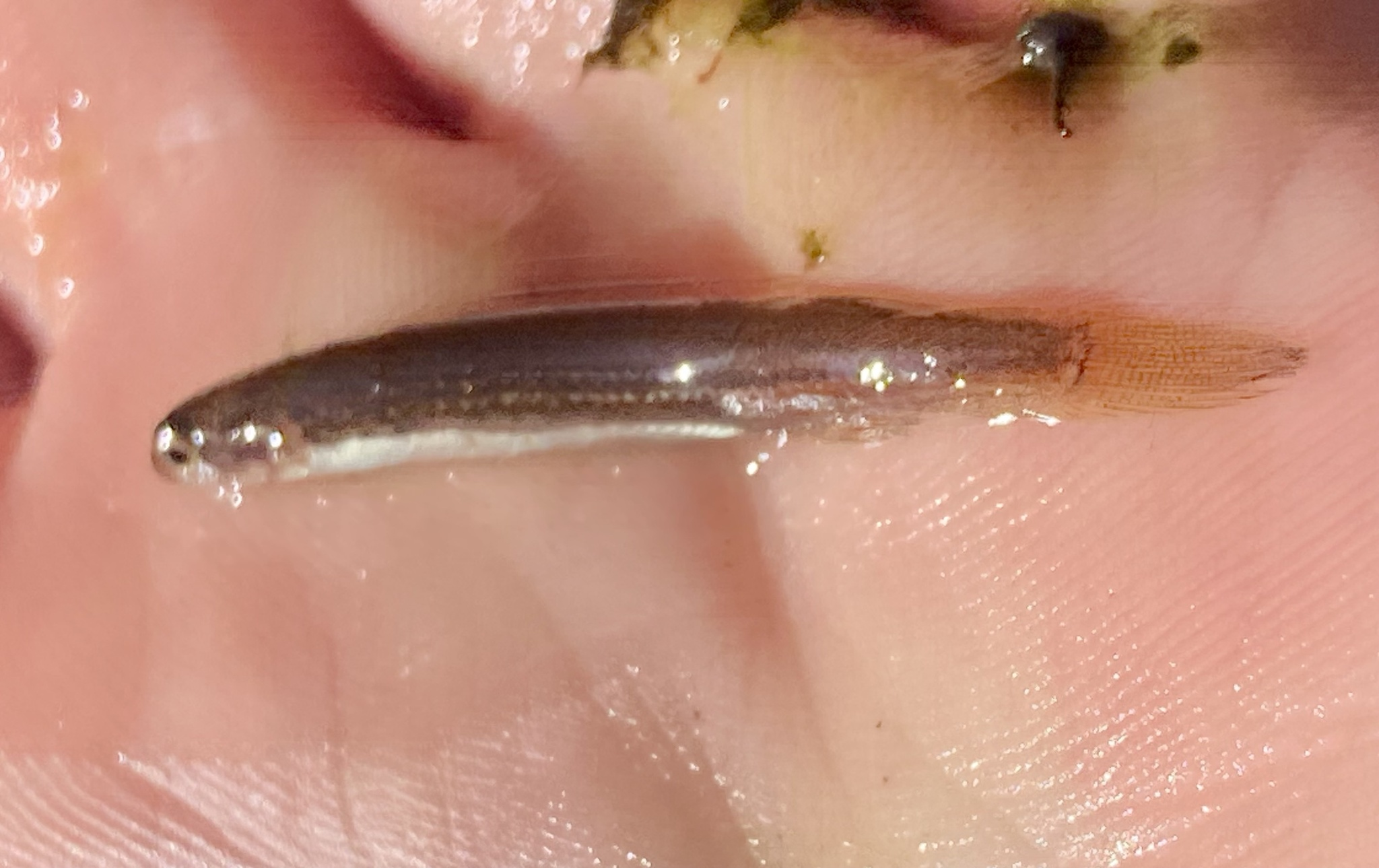

Conservation status
- Endangered (IUCN 3.1)

Scientific classification
- Kingdom: Animalia
- Phylum: Chordata
- Class: Actinopterygii
- Order: Galaxiiformes
- Family: Galaxiidae
- Genus: Galaxiella
- Species: G. munda

Binomial name
- Galaxiella munda McDowall, 1978
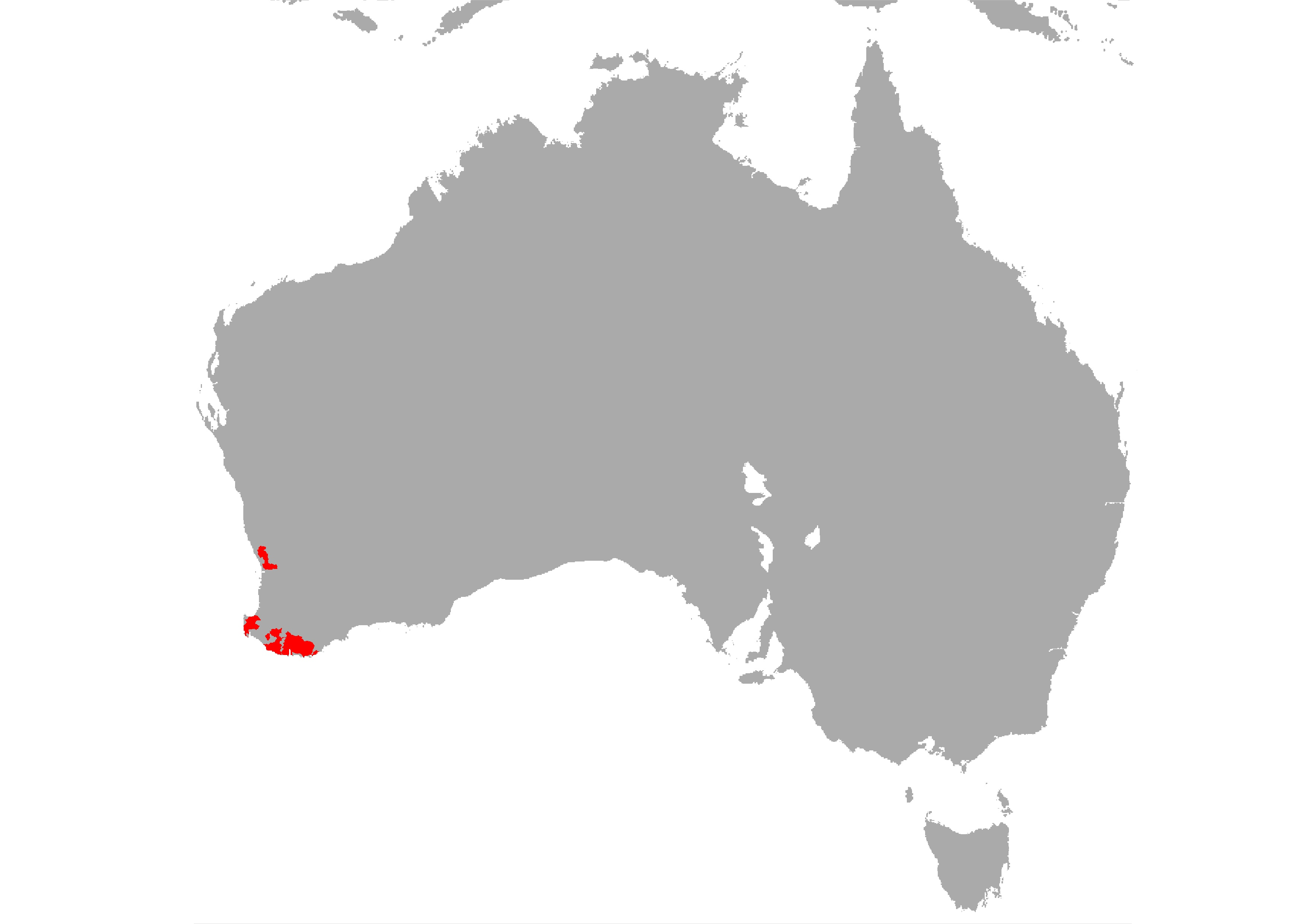

= Galaxiella munda =

Species of ray-finned fish

Galaxiella munda, also known as the Western mud minnow or western dwarf galaxias, is a species of freshwater ray-finned fish in the family Galaxiidae, endemic to inland waters of southwestern Australia. The name "mud minnow" also refers to the unrelated family Lepidogalaxiidae, while "swan galaxias" can refer to either Galaxiella munda or the cousin Galaxias species G. fontanus.

In 1999, G. munda was not included in the list of threatened species under the Environment Protection and Biodiversity Conservation Act, but is listed as Endangered on the IUCN Red List.

== Description ==
This species has a maximum length of 6 cm (2 in), with an elongated scaleless body, a white belly and a grey-brown back. A distinctive broad brown stripe starts from behind the eye and ends tailfins base.

The fish has a one-year life-cycle.

== Habitat ==
This species is only found in the southwest corner of Western Australia, preferring swift-flowing streams in Karri forest. It inhabits coastal rivers, streams, ponds, swamps and ditches between Albany and Ellen Brook. It can tolerate acidic water that is tannin stained and with a pH as low as 3.0.

== Diet ==
Galaxiella munda is carnivorous and mainly feeds on small insects, aquatic insect larvae and micro-crustaceans.
