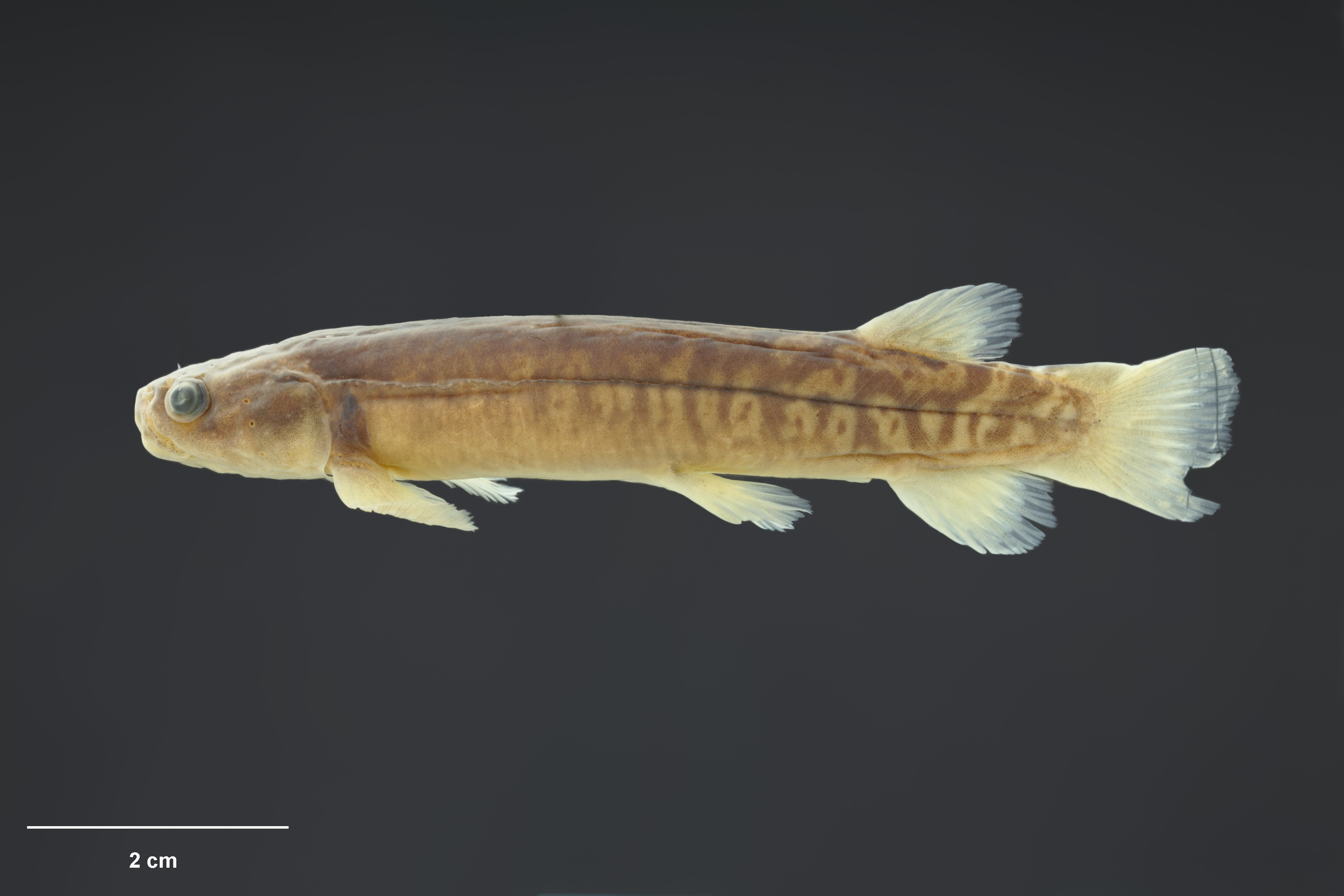
- Type specimen from the Te Papa collections

Conservation status
- Critically Endangered (IUCN 3.1)

Scientific classification
- Kingdom: Animalia
- Phylum: Chordata
- Class: Actinopterygii
- Order: Galaxiiformes
- Family: Galaxiidae
- Genus: Galaxias
- Species: G. pullus

Binomial name
- Galaxias pullus McDowall, 1997
- Approximate known distribution (in orange) of the dusky galaxias on a map of the South Island

= Dusky galaxias =

Species of ray-finned fish

The dusky galaxias (Galaxias pullus) is a galaxiid of the genus Galaxias, found only in the Taieri and Clutha catchments in Otago, New Zealand.
