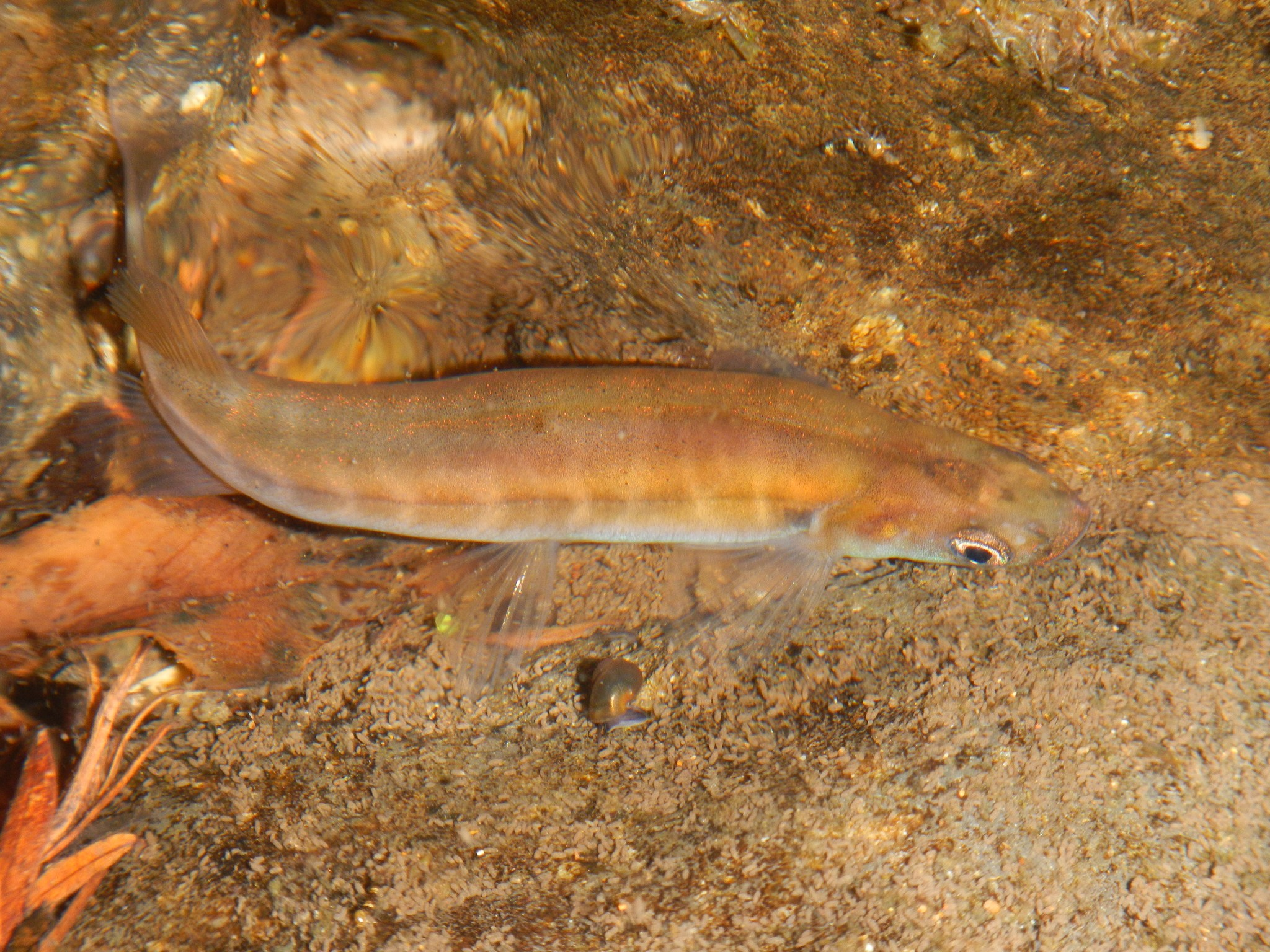
- Banded kōkopu

Conservation status
- Least Concern (IUCN 3.1)

Scientific classification
- Kingdom: Animalia
- Phylum: Chordata
- Class: Actinopterygii
- Order: Galaxiiformes
- Family: Galaxiidae
- Genus: Galaxias
- Species: G. fasciatus

Binomial name
- Galaxias fasciatus J. E. Gray, 1842
- Approximate known distribution of the banded kōkopu on a map of New Zealand

= Banded kōkopu =

Species of fish

The banded kōkopu (Galaxias fasciatus) is a galaxiid of the genus Galaxias, found only in New Zealand, including the Chatham and Stewart / Rakiura islands. It commonly grows to 20–25 cm, but has been recorded growing to around 30 cm. Juvenile banded kōkopu are good climbers and can climb up waterfalls and other vertical surfaces by moving into the splash zone and wriggling up the surface, using the water surface tension and their large downturned fins for grip.

== Description ==
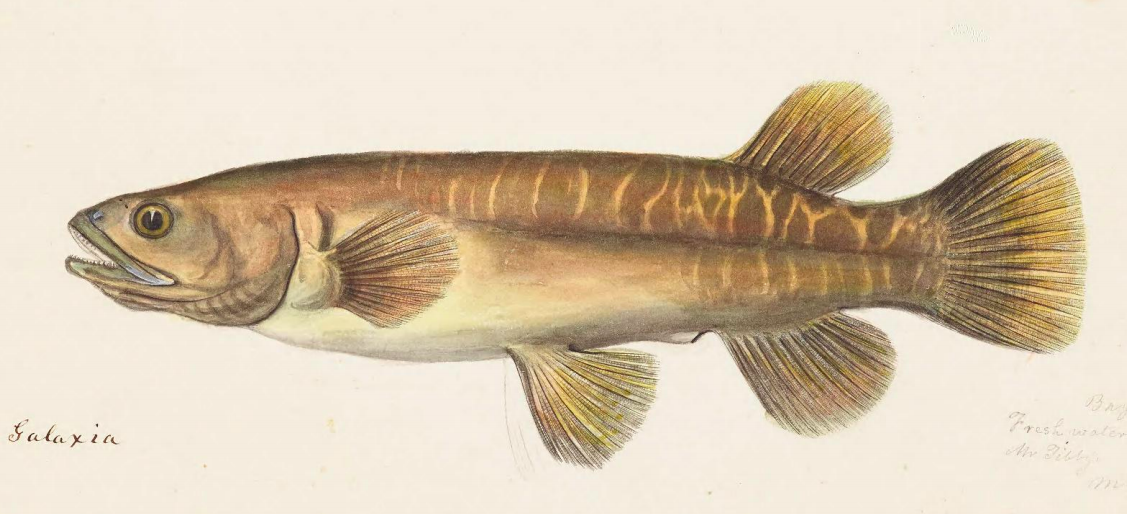
Galaxias fasciatus by Joseph Drayton

Banded kōkopu are a stout-bodied fish, with a large head and mouth. The fish are strong, rounded and fleshy. Like other galaxiids, the dorsal and anal fins are positioned close to the tail fin, which is short and square. The caudal peduncle is short and deep, with thick fleshy flanges which join the tail fin.

Adults are usually a dark, earthy brown or olive brown, with pale yellow vertical bands along the body. The belly is light coloured and unpatterned. Behind the operculum and above the pectoral fin is a silver or white mark, and sometimes a darker mark behind this. The bands either fade out top and bottom, or fork and crisscross the back of the fish. In small fish the bands are usually numerous and along the whole body, but in adults the bands become narrower and are often restricted to the rear third of the body. Although the bands change as the fish ages, the placement and shape of the bands are consistent enough to be used for individual identification over several years.

Medium and juvenile giant kōkopu can sometimes be mistaken for banded kōkopu, as they can also develop vertical stripes. The easiest way to differentiate between the two species is that banded kōkopu have a white or silver mark immediately behind the operculum, above the pectoral fin, and giant kōkopu do not. Also, the markings of banded kōkopu either fork and spread across the back of the fish, or fade out top and bottom, while the markings on giant kōkopu never fork, and have a crisp edge all the way around. Juvenile shortjaw kōkopu may also be mistaken for a very pale and poorly marked banded kōkopu, but the small mouth of the shortjaw is diagnostic.

== Distribution ==
Banded kōkopu are found only in New Zealand and just a handful of spawning sites are known. In 2018 a new spawning site was discovered in a tributary of York Stream, Nelson, where fish habitat and passage restoration has been carried out as part of Project Maitai.

In Nelson banded kōkopu occupy creeks and tributaries in lowland coastal flats and can penetrate inland to take refuge in pools/undercut banks in tributaries with over hanging vegetation.

== Life cycle ==
Banded kōkopu are diadromous, spending the first 3–4 months of life at sea, before migrating back to freshwater as whitebait of 40–45 mm (1.6–1.8 in) in length.

Banded kōkopu become sexually mature at two or three years old. They spawn in adult habitats during flood events in autumn and early winter, laying the 2 mm (0.079 in) diameter eggs amongst flooded vegetation and leaf litter on the edge of the stream. As the flood recedes the eggs are left to develop out of the water; the high humidity provided by the vegetation keeps them moist. After three to four weeks the embryos are fully developed and require a second flood to stimulate them to hatch, and the larvae are carried to sea on the floodwaters. They live amongst and on the plankton for 3–4 months before returning to freshwater.

Juvenile banded kōkopu can detect and are attracted to odours produced by adults. This suggests they have the ability to discriminate species-specific pheromones during their migratory phase, which alerts juveniles to suitable habitat based on the presence of adults.

Banded kōkopu can live for at least nine years, possibly longer, and spawn multiple times over their lifetime.

== Behaviour ==
Banded kōkopu are largely nocturnal, and may be easily and unobtrusively observed night, ideally using red light. Banded kōkopu may also be observed during the day if undisturbed.

Juvenile banded kōkopu are one of five species of galaxiid caught and eaten as whitebait.
