= Frederick McDowall =

New Zealand dairy scientist and administrator (1900–1974)

Frederick Henry McDowall OBE (1 September 1900 – 27 December 1974) was a New Zealand dairy scientist and administrator. He was born in Waianiwa, Southland, New Zealand on 1 September 1900.

In the 1960 New Year Honours, McDowall was appointed an Officer of the Order of the British Empire.

His son Bob McDowall became an ichthyologist.
