= Galaxias globiceps =

Conservation status
- Data Deficient (IUCN 2.3)

Scientific classification
- Kingdom: Animalia
- Phylum: Chordata
- Class: Actinopterygii
- Order: Galaxiiformes
- Family: Galaxiidae
- Genus: Galaxias
- Species: G. globiceps

Binomial name
- Galaxias globiceps C. H. Eigenmann, 1928

Species of ray-finned fish

Galaxias globiceps is a species of ray-finned fish in the family Galaxiidae endemic to Chile.

== Habitat ==
Galaxias globiceps lives in a freshwater environment in a temperate climate.

== Size ==
The average length of an unsexed male Galaxias globiceps is about 10.7 centimetres (4.2 in).

== Range ==
The species is known only from the type locality at Los Alerces near Puerto Montt, Chile.

== Notes ==
- Froese, Rainer; Pauly, Daniel (eds.). "Galaxias globiceps". FishBase. February 2010 version.
