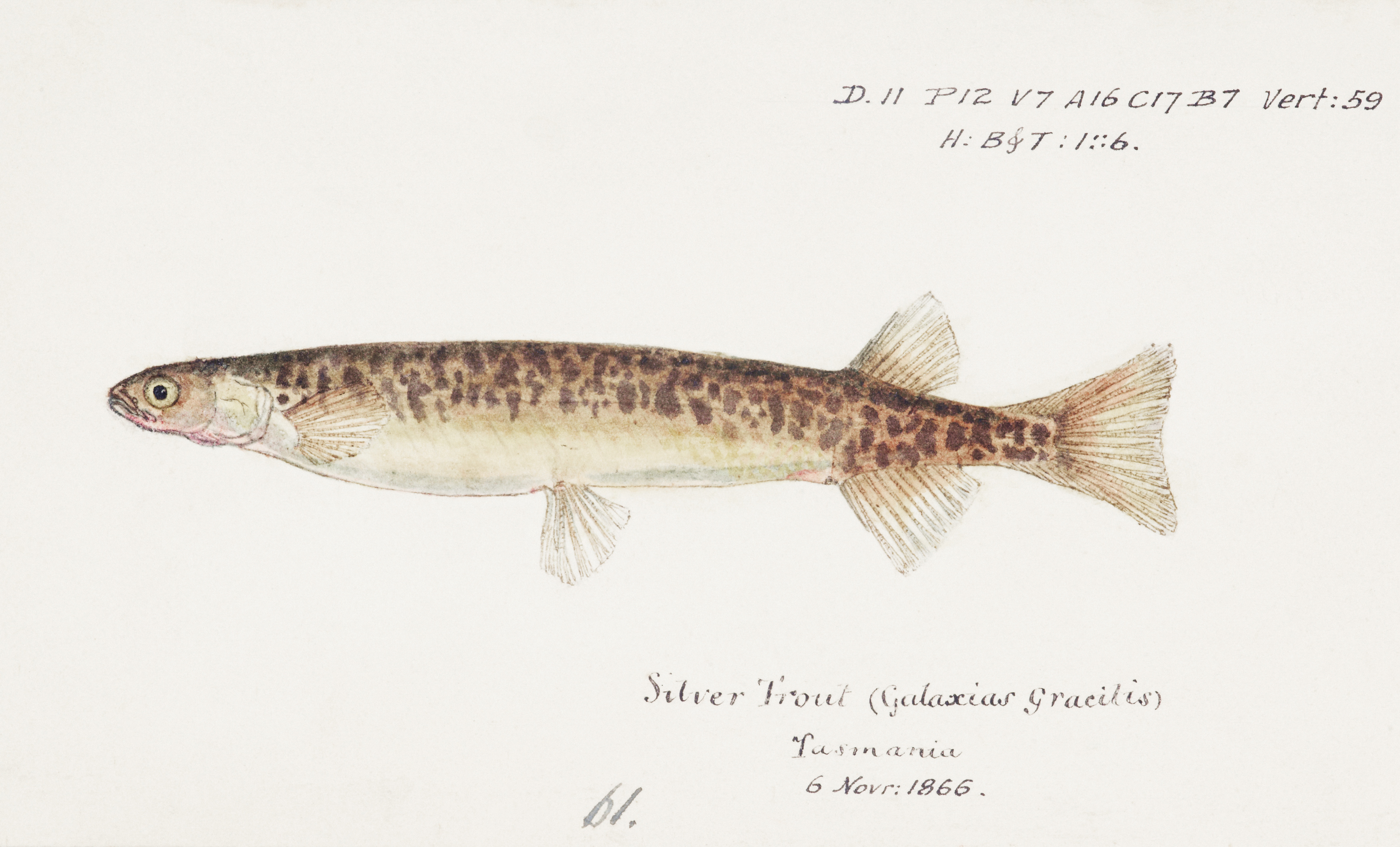

Conservation status
- Vulnerable (IUCN 3.1)

Scientific classification
- Kingdom: Animalia
- Phylum: Chordata
- Class: Actinopterygii
- Order: Galaxiiformes
- Family: Galaxiidae
- Genus: Galaxias
- Species: G. gracilis

Binomial name
- Galaxias gracilis McDowall, 1967
- Approximate known distribution (in orange) of the dwarf inanga on a map of the North Island

= Dwarf inanga =

Species of ray-finned fish

The dwarf inanga (Galaxias gracilis) is a galaxiid of the genus Galaxias, found in the North Island of New Zealand.

It is a landlocked galaxiid present in only eleven lakes on the west coast of the North Island within 50 km (31 mi) of Dargaville, and in Lake Ototoa on the South Kaipara Head, where it was introduced in 1986. It can reach a maximum length of around 6.2 cm (2.4 in).
