= Small pedder galaxias =

Conservation status
- Vulnerable (IUCN 3.1)

Scientific classification
- Kingdom: Animalia
- Phylum: Chordata
- Class: Actinopterygii
- Division: Teleostei
- Order: Galaxiiformes
- Family: Galaxiidae
- Genus: Galaxias
- Species: G. parvus

Binomial name
- Galaxias parvus Frankenberg, 1968

Species of ray-finned fish

The small pedder galaxias (Galaxias parvus) or swamp galaxias, is a species of ray-finned fish in the family Galaxiidae. It is endemic to Tasmania.
