= Tasmanian whitebait =

Scientific classification
- Kingdom: Animalia
- Phylum: Chordata
- Class: Actinopterygii
- Order: Galaxiiformes
- Family: Galaxiidae
- Subfamily: Aplochitoninae
- Genus: Lovettia; McCulloch, 1915
- Species: L. sealii

Binomial name
- Lovettia sealii (R. M. Johnston, 1883)
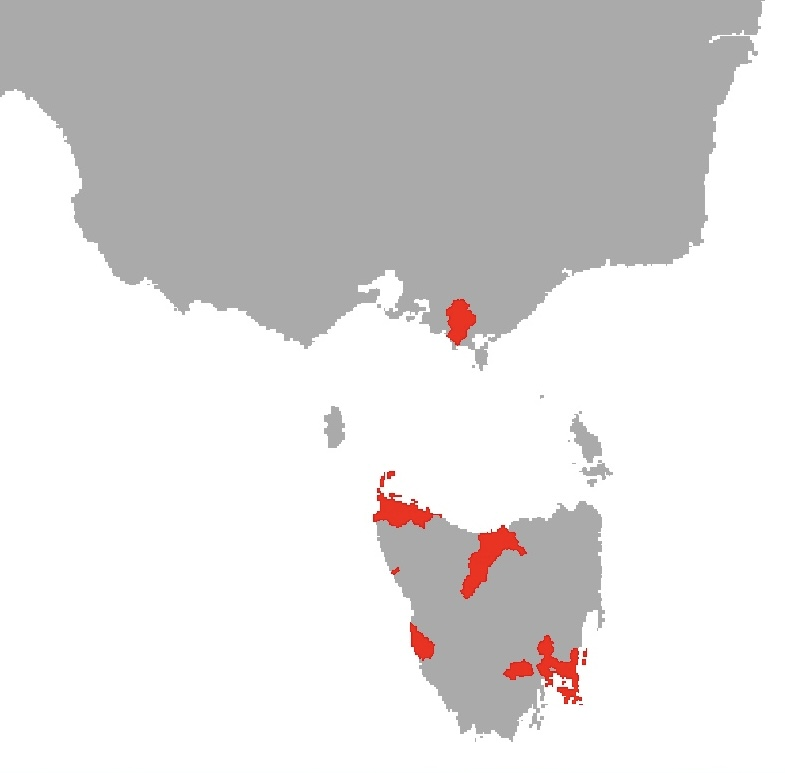

Synonyms
- Species synonymy: Haplochiton sealii Johnston, 1883

Species of ray-finned fish

The Tasmanian whitebait (Lovettia sealli), also known as the Australian whitebait or Derwent whitebait, is a semi-anadromous ray-finned fish of the family Galaxiidae, found only in Tasmania and southern Victoria, Australia. It is the only species in the genus Lovettia.

== Naming ==
Scottish naturalist Robert Mackenzie Johnston described the species in 1883 as Haplochiton sealii. Calling it the Derwent smelt, he observed that it appeared in numbers in the upper Derwent near New Norfolk in October and November. Allan Riverstone McCulloch placed it in the genus Lovettia in 1915, describing it from specimens collected by a Mr Lovett from the Derwent River.

Originally named Tasmanian whitebait the species was renamed Australian whitebait following the discovery of a population in southern Victoria on the Australian mainland in 1993.

It is the only species of its genus, Lovettia.

== Description ==
L. sealii is a slender, spindle shaped scale-less fish that grows to a maximum length of 77 mm, commonly 65 mm. It has a long tubular body that is moderately laterally compressed. The head is long and slender with a high, large and silvery eye and a conspicuous, protruding lower jaw. The dorsal fin is high and begins above or just posterior to the origin of the pelvic fin. The caudal fin is forked with short, although distinct, peduncle flanges. The anal fin is longer than the dorsal fin and begins well posterior to the dorsal fin base. Pectoral fins are long and slender. The fish has a large, clearly visible swim bladder located below the spine just forward of the longitudinal mid-point, and an adipose fin on the dorsal surface above the anal fin. Juveniles and marine adults are translucent, usually with a lateral line not clearly marked by pigment. Fins are generally clear except for small dark spots on the caudal fin. Adults have a silvery mid-lateral stripe. Dark pigmentation increases in adults in estuaries to almost completely black following spawning, with males typically darker than females. The ventral surface of gravid females is yellowish.

== Distribution and habitat ==
Historically only known from eastern, northern and western coastal regions in Tasmania, in 1993 a population was discovered in the Tarwin River adjacent to Anderson's Inlet in southern Victoria. The total range of Australian Whitebait in the Tarwin River has not been fully investigated, however the presence of the species in Anderson Inlet itself was reconfirmed in 2007 and again in 2014, demonstrating long-term persistence of the mainland population.

The habitat of Australian whitebait is poorly known. However, because of the anecdotal location of large schools of the species several kilometres to sea it has been suggested that adults inhabit primarily shallow coastal waters. Uniquely amongst the Galaxiidae, there does not appear to be a purely freshwater stage in the lifecycle of this species.

== Lifecycle ==
Mature adult Australian whitebait enter estuaries and migrate upstream to just below the upstream tidal limit, where spawning occurs over successive days from August to December. At approximately one year of age, after spawning, virtually all individuals die, with less than 1% reaching two years of age and surviving to spawn for a second time. Rather than dying immediately after spawning, adults gradually deteriorate. In Tasmania, schools of spent L. sealii have been recorded upstream of estuaries, which suggests that adults outliving their first spawning might remain within river systems. Recent otolith microchemistry analysis suggests that Australian whitebait are a semi-anadromous, or an estuarine dependant marine species, as residence in pure freshwater does not appear to occur during the life-cycle.

== Importance to humans ==
Australian whitebait form part of the whitebait harvest in Tasmania.

== Conservation status ==
Although not listed under the Commonwealth Environment Protection and Biodiversity Conservation Act 1999 Australian whitebait has been listed as threatened under the Victorian Flora and Fauna Guarantee Act 1988 and is considered Critically Endangered in Victoria by the Department of Environment, Land, Water and Planning's List of Threatened Vertebrate Fauna in Victoria – 2013.
