= Manuherikia =

Manuherikia may refer to the following, all in New Zealand:

- Manuherikia (bird), genus of Miocene ducks
- Manuherikia (New Zealand electorate), 1866–1870
- Manuherikia Group, sediments (geological terminology)
- Manuherikia River
- Lake Manuherikia
