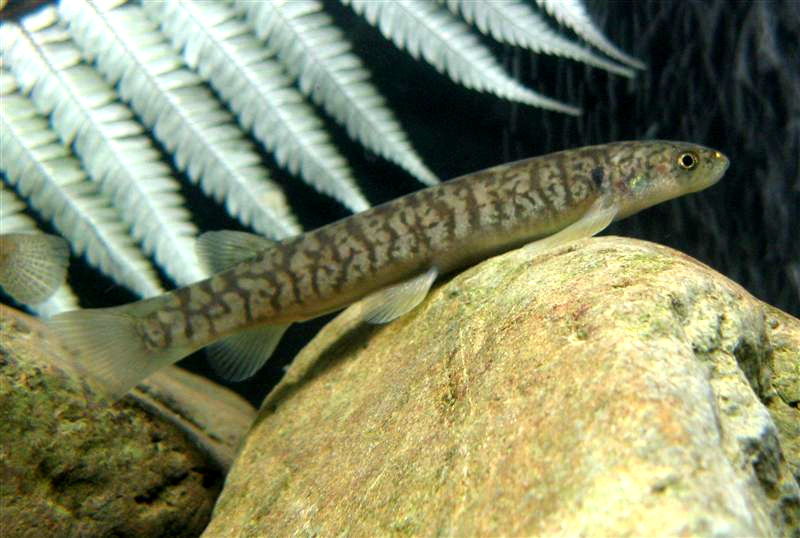
- Juvenile kōaro

Conservation status
- Least Concern (IUCN 3.1)

Scientific classification
- Kingdom: Animalia
- Phylum: Chordata
- Class: Actinopterygii
- Order: Galaxiiformes
- Family: Galaxiidae
- Genus: Galaxias
- Species: G. brevipinnis

Binomial name
- Galaxias brevipinnis Günther, 1866
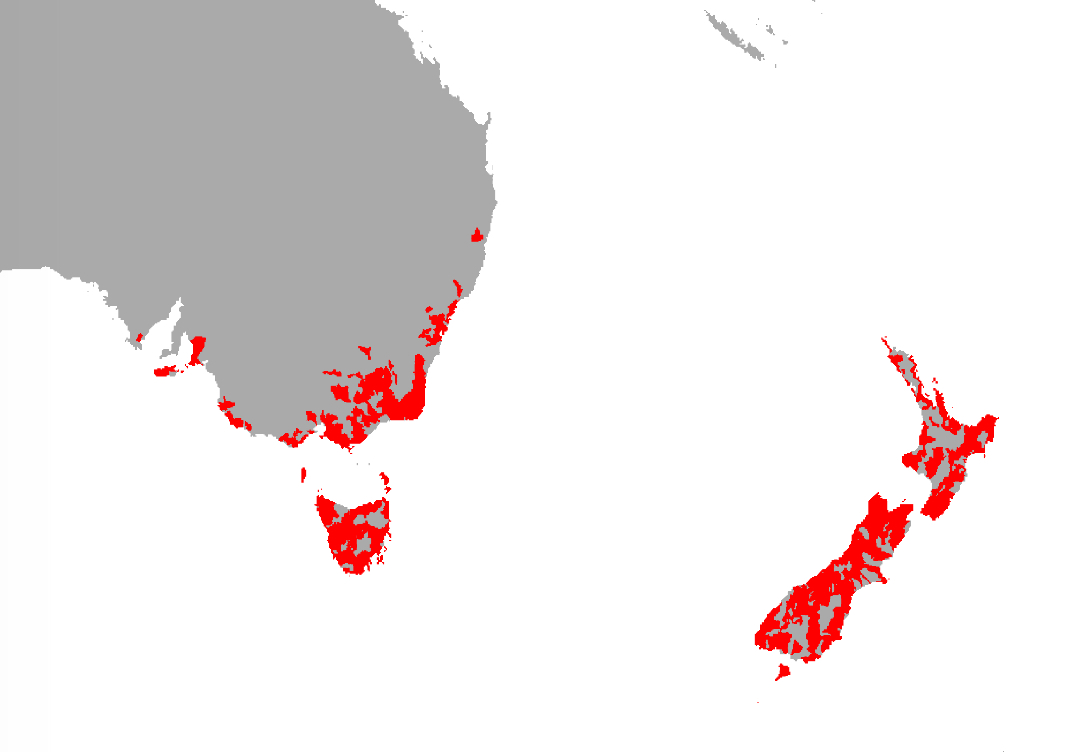

= Climbing galaxias =

Kōaro or climbing galaxias

Species of fish

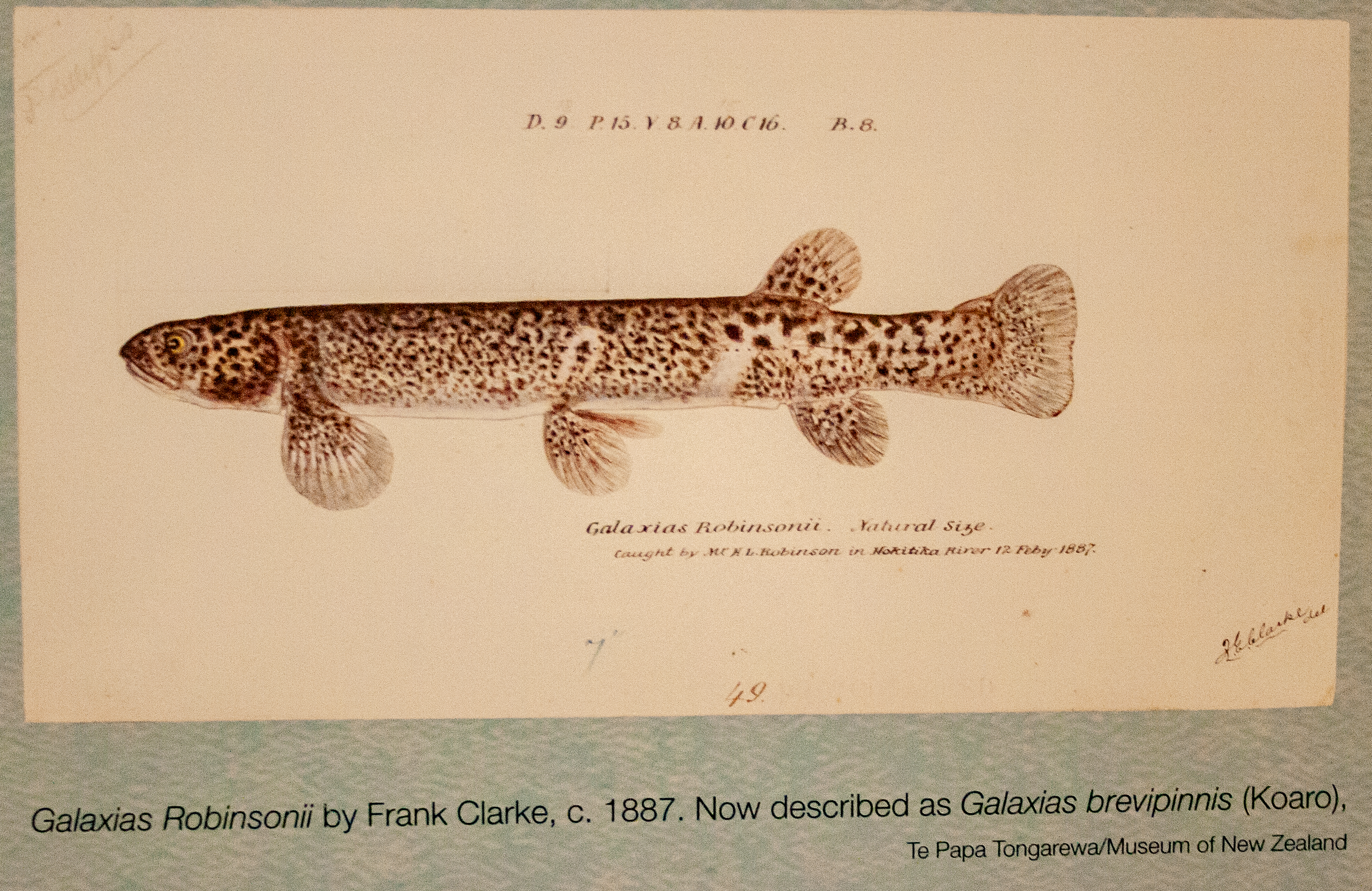
Koaro on a drawing by Frank Edward Clarke, c. 1887

The climbing galaxias or kōaro (Galaxias brevipinnis) is a fish of the family Galaxiidae found in Australia, New Zealand, and nearby islands. The name climbing galaxias is used in Australia, and koaro or kōaro in New Zealand. Further vernacular names include short-finned galaxias, broad-finned galaxias, Cox's mountain galaxias, and Pieman galaxias.

== Appearance ==
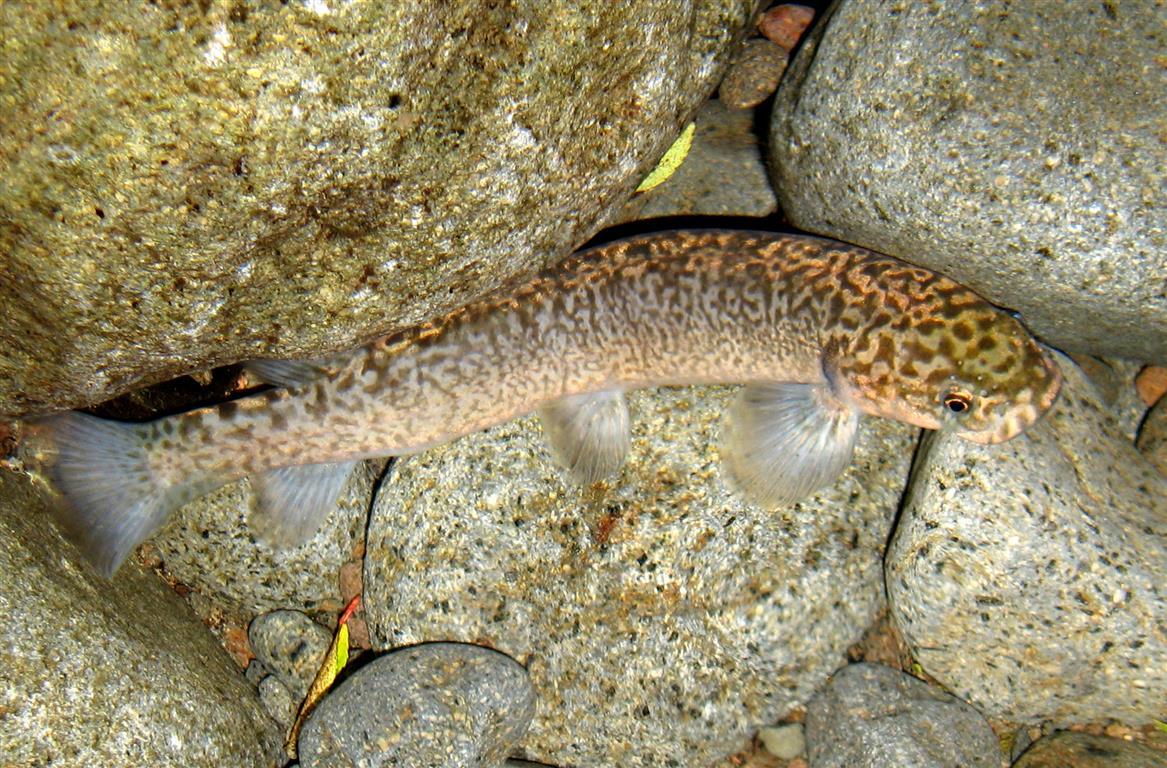
Adult kōaro (Galaxias brevipinnis)

The climbing galaxias is unlikely to be confused with the other diadromous whitebait species because of its shape. It is elongated and slender, shaped almost like a tube. The sides and back are covered in a variable pattern of golden blotches and bands that gleam and glitter in the sun, making the climbing galaxias an attractive fish.

Their maximum size is around 29 cm, but they commonly reach 16–18 cm.

== Lifestyle ==
These fish live a basically benthic lifestyle and in most respects behave like the common galaxias, a closely related galaxiid. They inhabit mainly clear streams, often deeply shaded and relatively fast-flowing, although they sometimes occur in lakes, particularly in Tasmania. Climbing galaxias also have the ability to penetrate well inland in many river systems, thus have a more widespread distribution than the other whitebait species.

A major distinguishing feature of this species is its ability to climb up very steep surfaces such as waterfalls, wet rocks, and the sluices of dams using its broad and downward facing pectoral and pelvic fins. Even juveniles of the species are capable of climbing up and over the sides of buckets after being trapped in whitebait nets.

Climbing ability is not unique among galaxias species, but it reaches its greatest expression in the climbing galaxias, which have special features that enhance their climbing abilities. The downward orientation of their fins and the strong, backward-facing ridges on the front part of their fins possibly contribute to this ability.

Climbing galaxias once formed large populations in some lakes. It once roamed New Zealand's Lake Taupō in huge shoals and was caught in huge numbers by Maori people using specialised nets. Introduced rainbow trout has now virtually eradicated the species from Lake Taupō. Similarly, the introduction of brown trout eradicated a climbing galaxias population from Lake Tali Karng in Victoria, Australia (Cadwallader, 1996).

== Lifecycle ==
G. brevipinnis eggs are believed to be washed downstream to the sea, where the young live for about six months before returning to fresh water as part of the large, mixed-species schools known as whitebait. They were once part of a commercial whitebait fishery in Tasmania, but now fishing for them has been restricted to recreational anglers with significant restrictions on allowable tackle and methods. Land-locked populations have a similar lifestyle except the young spend the first part of their lives in inland lakes and backwaters.

== Diet ==
These fish are generalised carnivores of invertebrates, including aquatic and terrestrial insects, mayfly and caddisfly larvae, and amphipods.

== Distribution ==
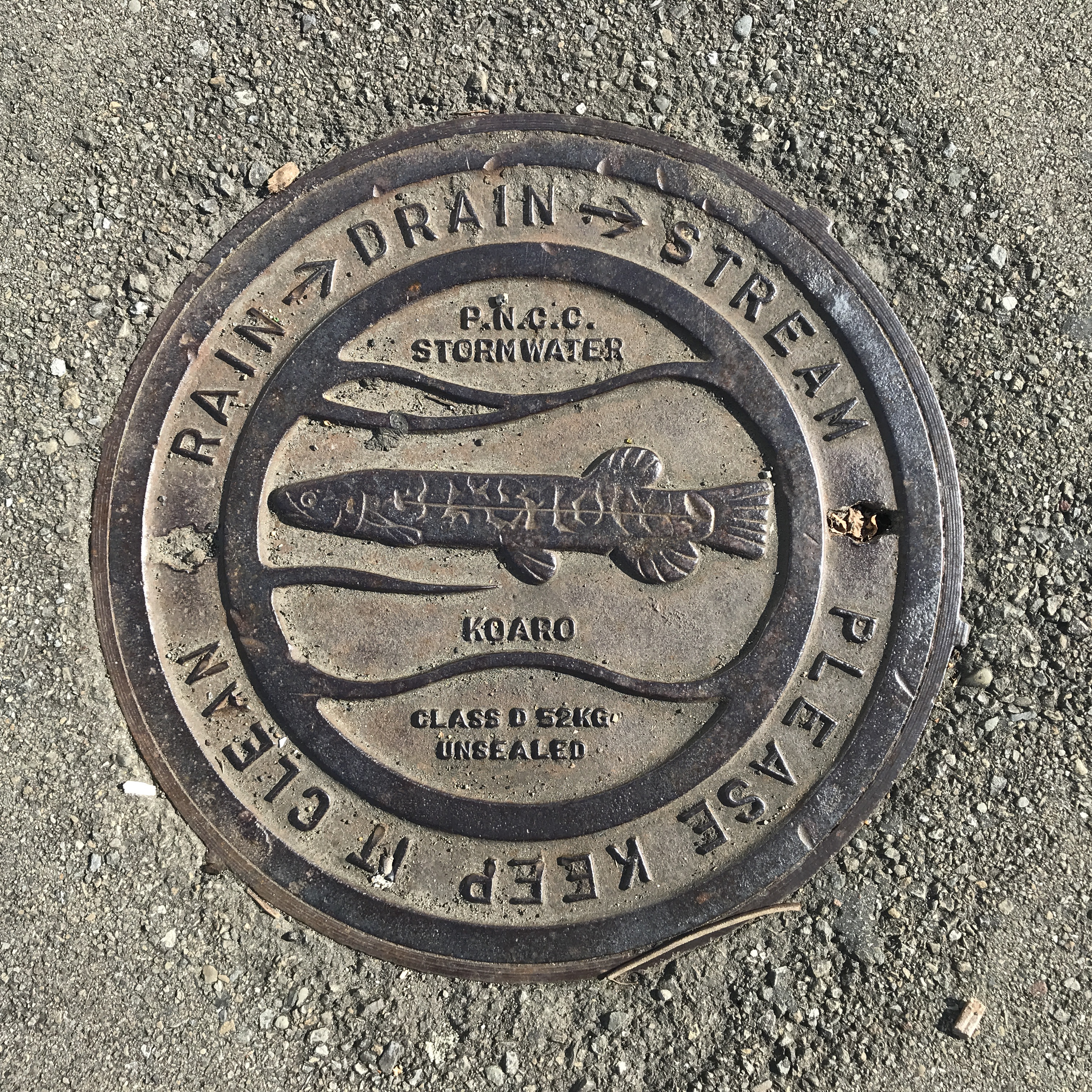
Manhole cover depicting kōaro (Galaxias brevipinnis), Palmerston North, New Zealand, warning against polluting nearby waterways by dumping chemicals in the street.

Their distribution extends to coastal streams in southeastern Australia from Adelaide and Kangaroo Island in South Australia, through coastal Victoria including Wilsons Promontory, Tasmania, Flinders and King Islands, and north along the New South Wales coast to around Sydney, as well as New Zealand including the Chatham, Auckland and Campbell Islands.

Their climbing ability enables them to inhabit headwaters of streams that introduced species, such as trout, cannot reach.
