= Clarence galaxias =

Conservation status
- Endangered (IUCN 3.1)

Scientific classification
- Kingdom: Animalia
- Phylum: Chordata
- Class: Actinopterygii
- Division: Teleostei
- Order: Galaxiiformes
- Family: Galaxiidae
- Genus: Galaxias
- Species: G. johnstoni

Binomial name
- Galaxias johnstoni E. O. G. Scott, 1936

Species of ray-finned fish

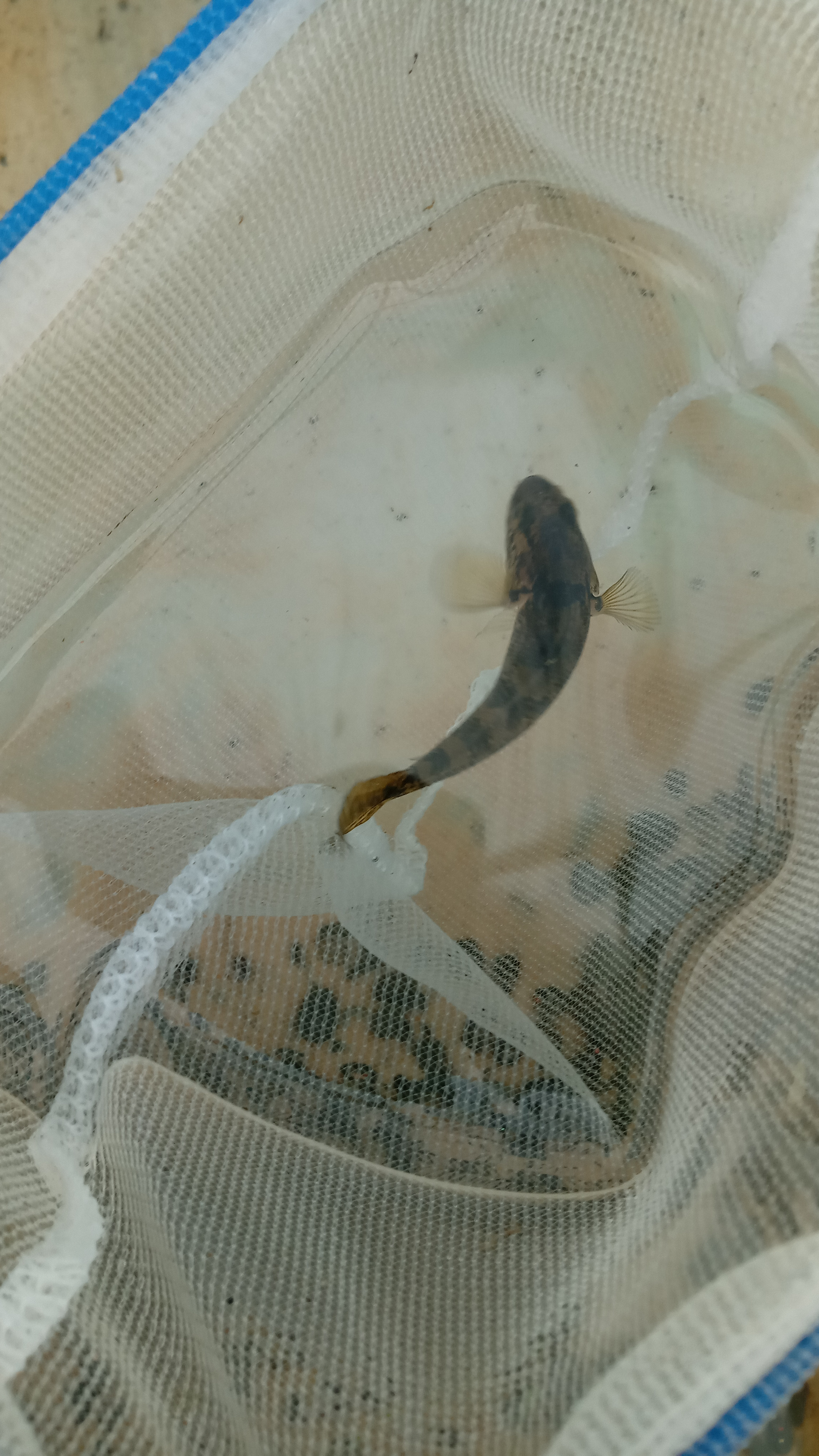

The Clarence galaxias (Galaxias johnstoni) is a species of ray-finned fish in the family Galaxiidae endemic to Tasmania.

== Description ==
The Clarence galaxias is scaleless and has a dark brown back with brown bars and bands extending down its sides, while the belly is a lighter yellow-cream color. Adults reach a body length of 12.5–14 cm and a maximum weight of 20 g.

== Distribution and habitat ==
The Clarence galaxias is a freshwater species and inhabits lakes as well as swamps and streams connected to lakes. It is endemic to Tasmania's Derwent River catchment, including the Clarence Lagoon. Only seven breeding populations are currently known.

== Conservation ==
While locally common, the species has been classified as endangered by the IUCN. It is under pressure from predation and competition from introduced brown trout and rainbow trout.

== Behavior ==
This Galaxia is an ambush predator. They burrow or find a lair to predate from. Unless food is bountiful they show vigor and are aggressive during feeding .They tend to perch themselves on top of structures such as rocks using their pectoral fins regularly. They are more active during the evening. The foods observed eaten are only live foods such as nymphs, mosquito larve, and brine shrimp. Blood worms are an exception and also eaten frozen. Upon further observation, they clunkily get around swimming, turning their body they seem stiff in the mid section. They have tremendous strength relative to size with a thick front section, large gaping jaw and large fan like fins.
