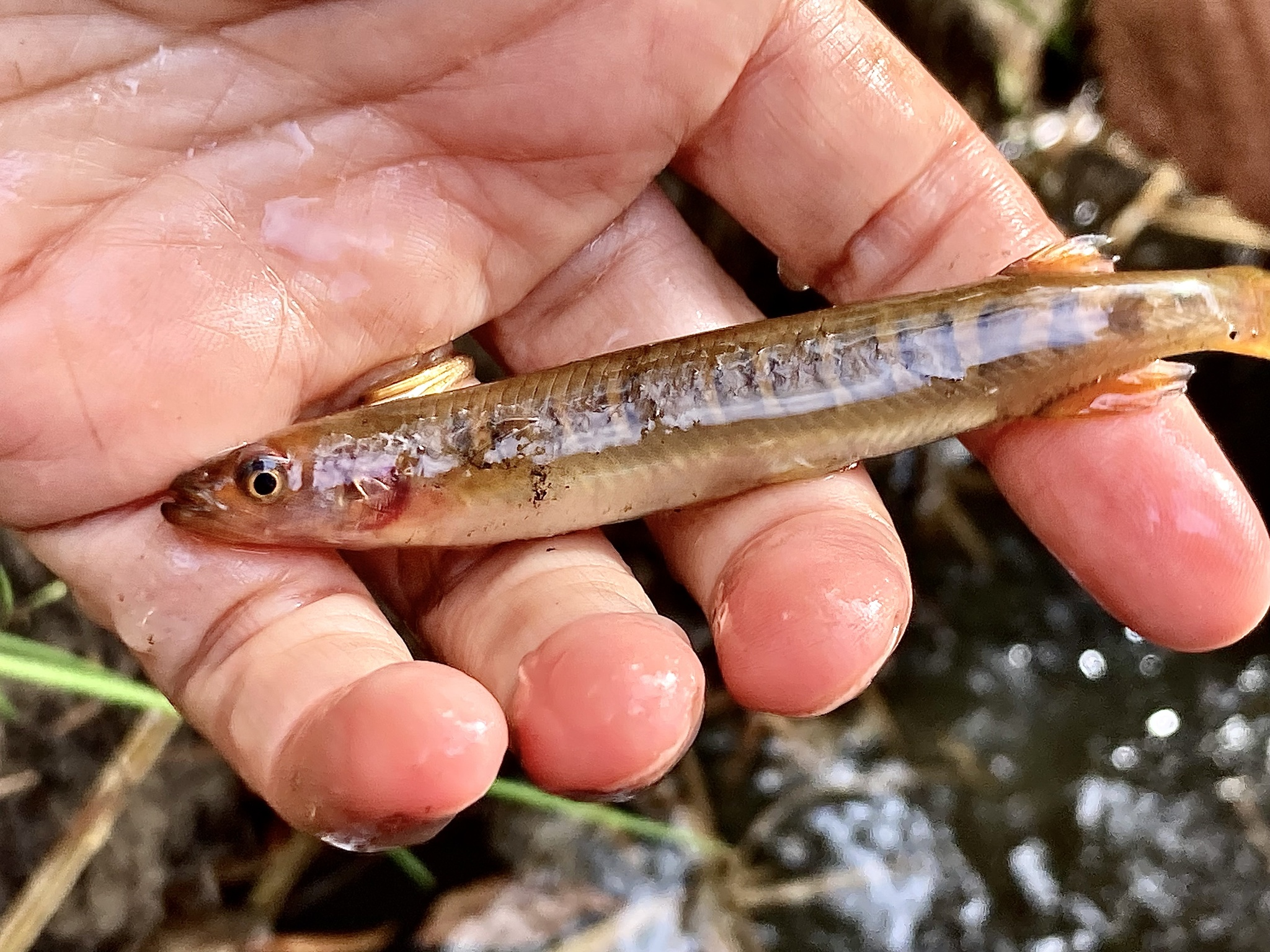

Conservation status
- Least Concern (IUCN 3.1)

Scientific classification
- Kingdom: Animalia
- Phylum: Chordata
- Class: Actinopterygii
- Division: Teleostei
- Order: Galaxiiformes
- Family: Galaxiidae
- Genus: Galaxias
- Species: G. occidentalis

Binomial name
- Galaxias occidentalis J. D. Ogilby, 1899

= Western galaxias =

Species of fish

The western galaxias (Galaxias occidentalis), also called the western minnow, is a species of fish in the genus Galaxias of small, Southern Hemisphere freshwater fish of the family Galaxiidae. It is endemic to southwestern Australia.

== Description ==
The western galaxias is large compared with other galaxiids, commonly growing to around 100 millimetres (4 in) in length but can grow up to 170 millimetres (7 in). It is a slender fish with a flattened head and snout and no scales. The single dorsal fin is set far back above the anal fin and has seven to ten soft rays while the anal fin has eleven to fourteen soft rays. Its dorsal surface and flanks are olive green with indistinct dark vertical bars and its belly is silvery-white.

== Distribution and habitat ==
The western galaxias is found in many waterways in the South West region of Western Australia from north of Perth to as far east as Albany. It is found in clear water at the edge of pools in rivers, at the base of rapids or waterfalls, in ponds, in shallow parts of lakes and in slow-flowing saline rivers. It can tolerate brackish pools and acidic or tannin-stained water.

== Behaviour ==
The western galaxias is a fast-swimming schooling fish and often forms shoals just above the substrate in the shallows. It is often found in and around submerged vegetation in rocky pools at the base of rapids and waterfalls. At the beginning of the wet season it moves upstream to small streams where it spawns among vegetation in flooded areas. It becomes sexually mature at the age of one year and may live for five years. The western galaxias is carnivorous and mainly feeds on small insects and crustaceans.
