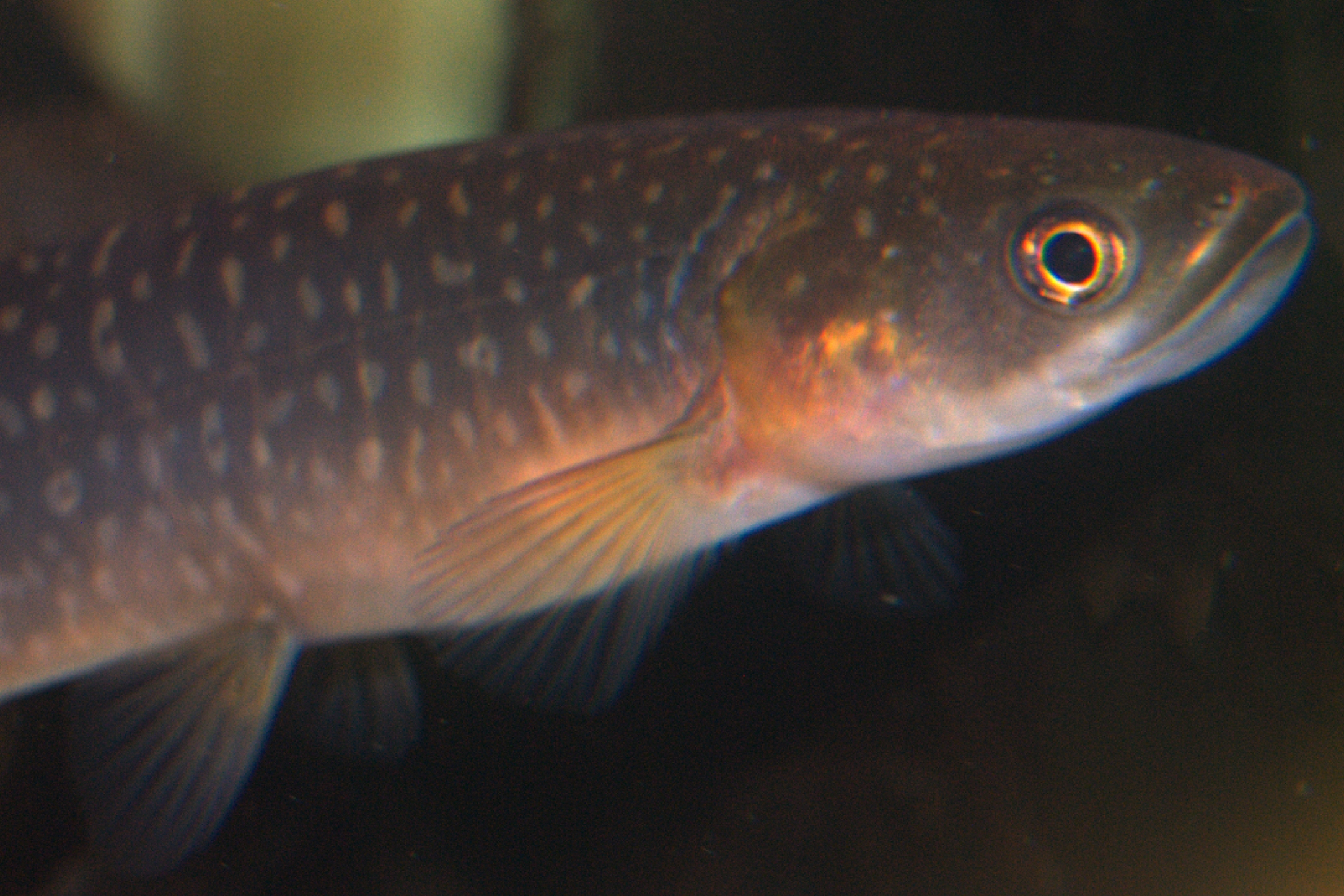

Conservation status
- Vulnerable (IUCN 3.1)

- Gradual Decline (NZ TCS)

Scientific classification
- Kingdom: Animalia
- Phylum: Chordata
- Class: Actinopterygii
- Division: Teleostei
- Order: Galaxiiformes
- Family: Galaxiidae
- Genus: Galaxias
- Species: G. argenteus

Binomial name
- Galaxias argenteus (J. F. Gmelin, 1789)
- Approximate known distribution (in orange) of the giant kōkopu on a map of New Zealand

= Giant kōkopu =

Species of fish

The giant kōkopu (Galaxias argenteus) is a threatened species of ray-finned fish in the genus Galaxias, found only in New Zealand. It can reach up to 58 cm (23 in) in length and 2.7 kg (6.0 lb) in weight, making it the largest species in the family Galaxiidae. It is a mainly lowland species, commonly found in slow-flowing streams, wetlands, lakes, and lagoons. Most populations have an amphidromous life cycle, with larvae going to sea soon after hatching and returning about four months later as small juveniles, 4.5–5 cm (1.8–2.0 in). Juvenile giant kōkopu form a small part of the annual whitebait catch.

== Etymology ==
The first species in the family Galaxiidae to be described by scientists, the giant kōkopu was initially placed in the genus Esox (pikes) by Johann Friedrich Gmelin in 1789. Cuvier recognised that it was not a pike and in 1816 coined the genus name Galaxias as a reference to its star-like (galaxy) markings. The genus was later expanded to include numerous other species, most of which lack this pattern.

Giant kōkopu are also known as "native trout" or "Māori trout". For many years the standard spelling was "kokopu", without the macron that indicates the first vowel is lengthened in Te Reo Māori, but the spelling "kōkopu" is increasingly frequently used for this New Zealand English loanword.

== Description ==
The giant kōkopu commonly grows to 30–40 cm (12–16 in) in total length. Larger individuals are uncommon, but there is a record of one reaching 58 cm (23 in) in length and 2.7 kg (6.0 lb) in weight, which makes this the largest species of galaxiid. Like all galaxiids, giant kōkopu lack scales and have a thick, leathery skin covered with mucus. Their body is very broad, appearing round or square in cross-section, with strong, fleshy fins and a very large mouth. Giant kōkopu are typically olive brown, varying from near-black to pale olive. In adults the body is patterned with pale yellow spots, crescents and lines, markings becoming smaller and more profuse as the fish ages; the patterning begins in juveniles with sparse vertical bars and spots along the lateral line. As the fish grows these markings lengthen and then fade out, while the adult markings fade in. Young giant kokōpu may be confused with small banded kōkopu (Galaxias fasciatus), but giant kōkopu lack a silver mark behind the gills, and their markings never fork or fade out at the top and bottom.

== Behaviour and habitat ==
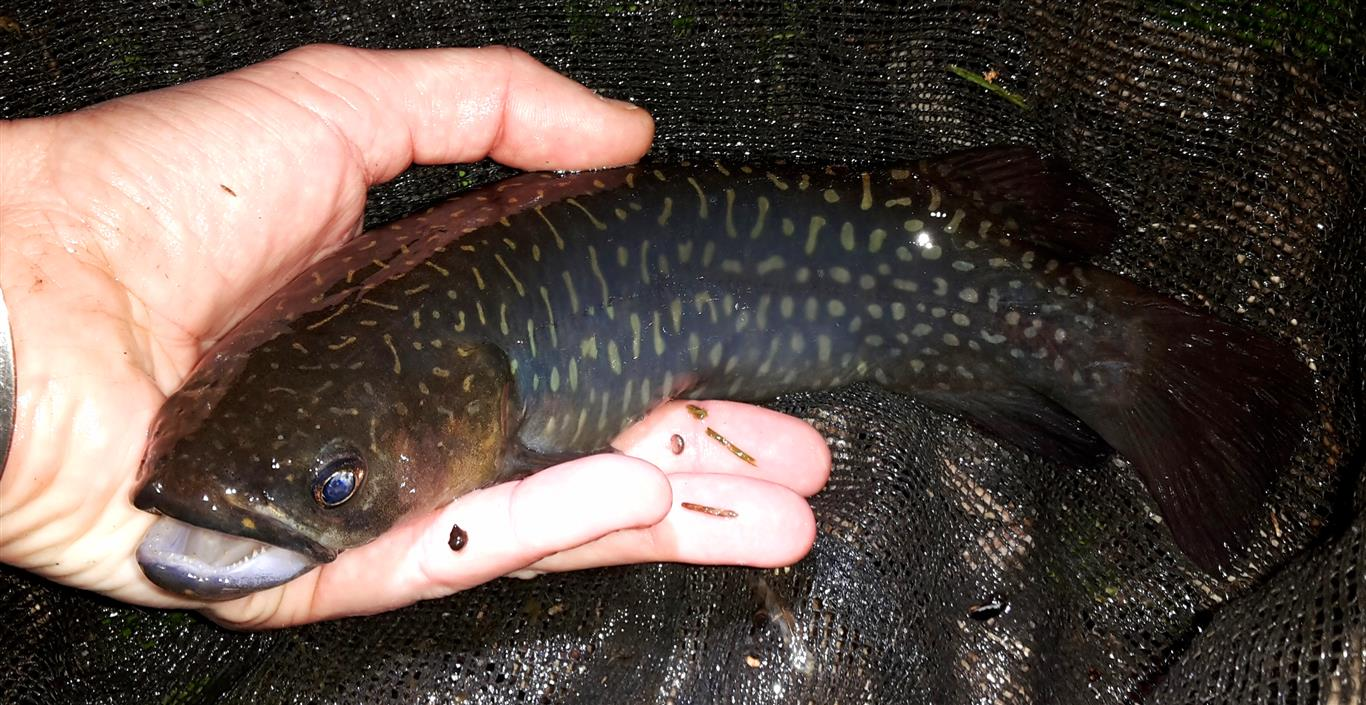
Adult giant kōkopu, about 25 cm (10 in) long

Adult giant kōkopu are found in fresh water, mostly near the coast. Their young enter fresh water in the spring after spending 4–6 months at sea. As at 2016 spawning has only been recorded as being observed in the wild once. It occurs during autumn/winter and the eggs (first discovered in 2013) are placed among vegetation along the banks. The species has a relatively high fecundity, each female producing several thousand eggs. Typically for amphidromous galaxiids from New Zealand, the eggs develop in semi-dry conditions on land for a few weeks and are then flooded by rising water. The best hatch rates for the eggs are in fresh water at a temperature of about 10 °C (50 °F). Although primarily amphidromous, some populations exist permanently in land-locked stream systems, showing they can complete their life-cycle in fresh water. Maturity is reached at 2–3 years old. The oldest known individual, which was 40 cm (16 in) long and weighed 1.05 kg (2.3 lb), was estimated to be 21–27 years old based on its otolith. Adults prefer slow-flowing waters in lowland streams or pools. They usually use cover such as overhanging vegetation, logs, undercut banks, or debris to lurk, awaiting passing prey. They prefer water temperatures between 11 and 15 °C (52–59 °F), but can live outside this range; their rarity north of Auckland is probably related to temperature. Their diet includes aquatic and terrestrial insects, freshwater crayfish (Paranephrops spp.), spiders, and occasionally other fish. They are generally nocturnal and slow-moving.

== Conservation ==
In 2014, the New Zealand Department of Conservation classified the giant kōkopu as "At Risk: Declining" under criterion "B(1/1) - 20,000–100,000 mature individuals, predicted decline 10–50%". The giant kōkopu has been rated as "Vulnerable" by the IUCN since 1996. Primary reasons for their decline include ongoing drainage of wetlands, drain clearance, and land-use changes, particularly the expansion and intensification of dairy farming. Other threats are loss of riparian vegetation and introduced salmonids (trout).

Giant kōkopu have been successfully bred in captivity. The species is highly prized as a traditional food and is considered to have potential in aquaculture.
