= Te Wairepo / York Stream =

- Location of Te Wairepo / York Stream
- Etymology: From Māori: Water running through a swamp
- Native name: Te Wairepo (Māori)

Location
- Country: New Zealand
- Unitary authority: Nelson

Physical characteristics
- Source
  - location: Enner Glynn
  - coordinates: 41.3059°S 173.268°E
  - elevation: 178 metres (584 ft)
- Mouth: Maitai River
  - location: Nelson
  - coordinates: 41.2675°S 173.2799°E
  - elevation: 0 metres (0 ft)

Te Wairepo / York Stream is a major tributary of the Maitai / Mahitahi River in Nelson, New Zealand.

The Maori name Te Wairepo means "water running through a swamp". Before the valley was drained and houses built by early European settlers, stands of flax covered the low-lying areas through which Te Wairepo flowed.

Restoration of this, now largely urban, waterway has been a major focus of Project Maitai / Mahitahi, a Nelson City Council initiative to improve the health of the Maitai River and all its tributaries.
