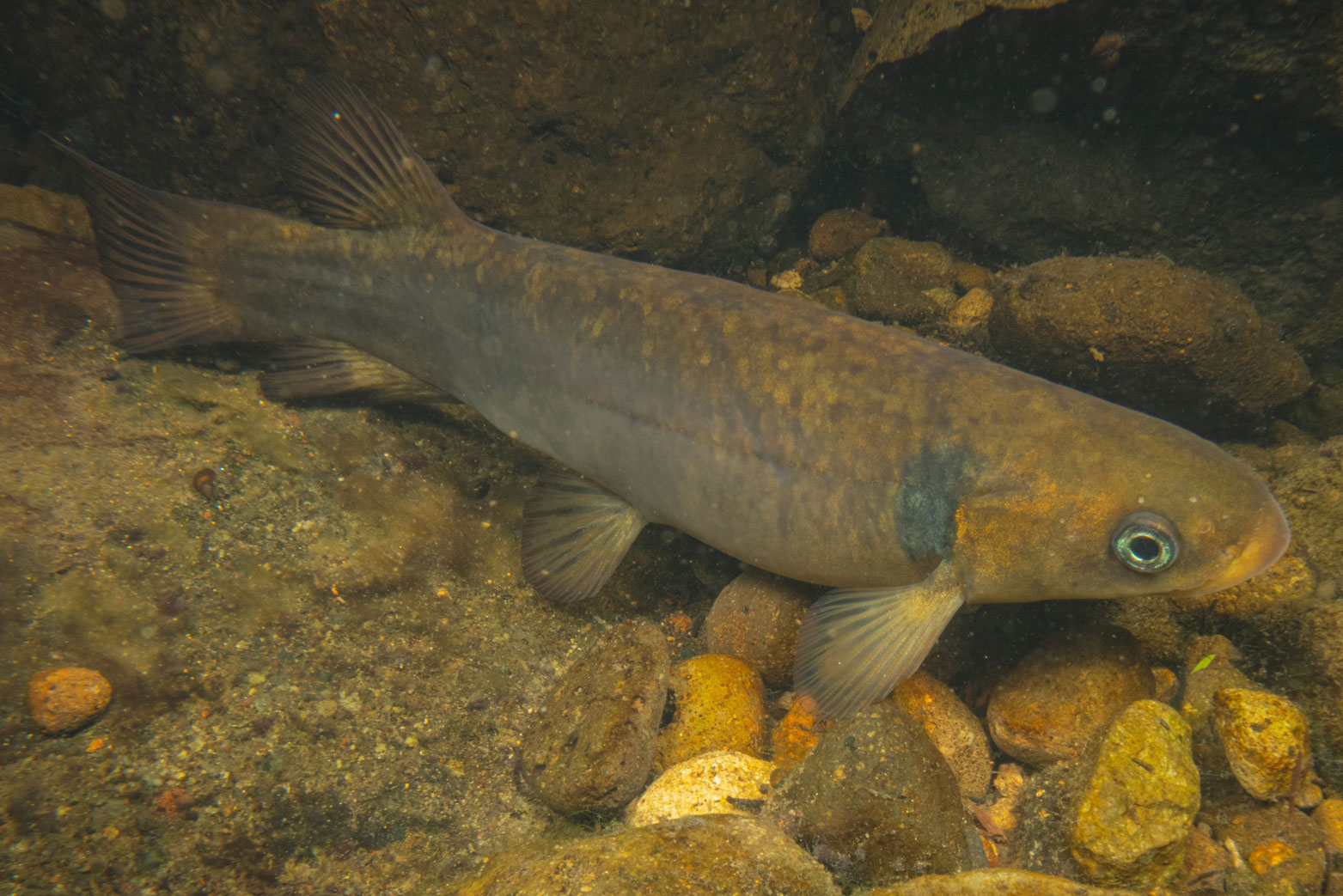
- Adult shortjaw kōkopu
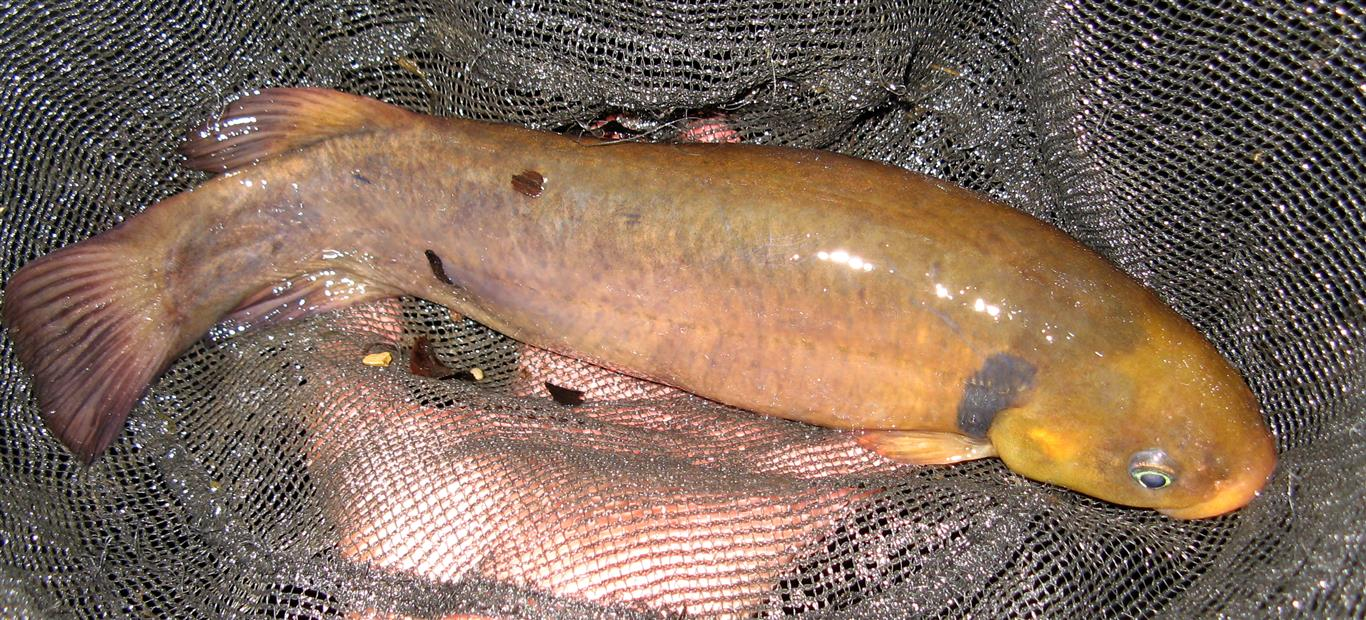
- Adult shortjaw kōkopu showing orange colouration

Conservation status
- Endangered (IUCN 3.1)

Scientific classification
- Kingdom: Animalia
- Phylum: Chordata
- Class: Actinopterygii
- Order: Galaxiiformes
- Family: Galaxiidae
- Genus: Galaxias
- Species: G. postvectis

Binomial name
- Galaxias postvectis F. E. Clarke, 1899
- Approximate known distribution (in orange) of the shortjaw kōkopu on a map of New Zealand

= Shortjaw kōkopu =

Species of ray-finned fish

The shortjaw kōkopu (Galaxias postvectis) is a galaxiid ray-finned fish, endemic to New Zealand. They are large, scaleless fish that inhabit stable pools in cascading, boulder-strewn streams with forest cover. Shortjaw kōkopu are amphidromous, with the fry going to sea after hatching, and returning as juveniles to fresh water where they grow to adulthood. They may grow to a maximum of 350 mm (14 in) in total length, but more commonly reach 150–200 mm (5.9–7.9 in).

The shortjaw kōkopu live in microhabitats that have more large particles at the bed of the body of water (substrates) and more places to seek safety compared to all nearby possible habitats. During the night, they remain in calmer areas like pools, whereas during the day shortjaw kōkopu spend their time in places with large substrates and a more tumultuous water surface, staying in both flow channel and pool habits.

In 2023 a newly recorded population of this species was detected in the Kopuawhara catchment north of Māhia Peninsula in Hawkes Bay using environmental DNA.
