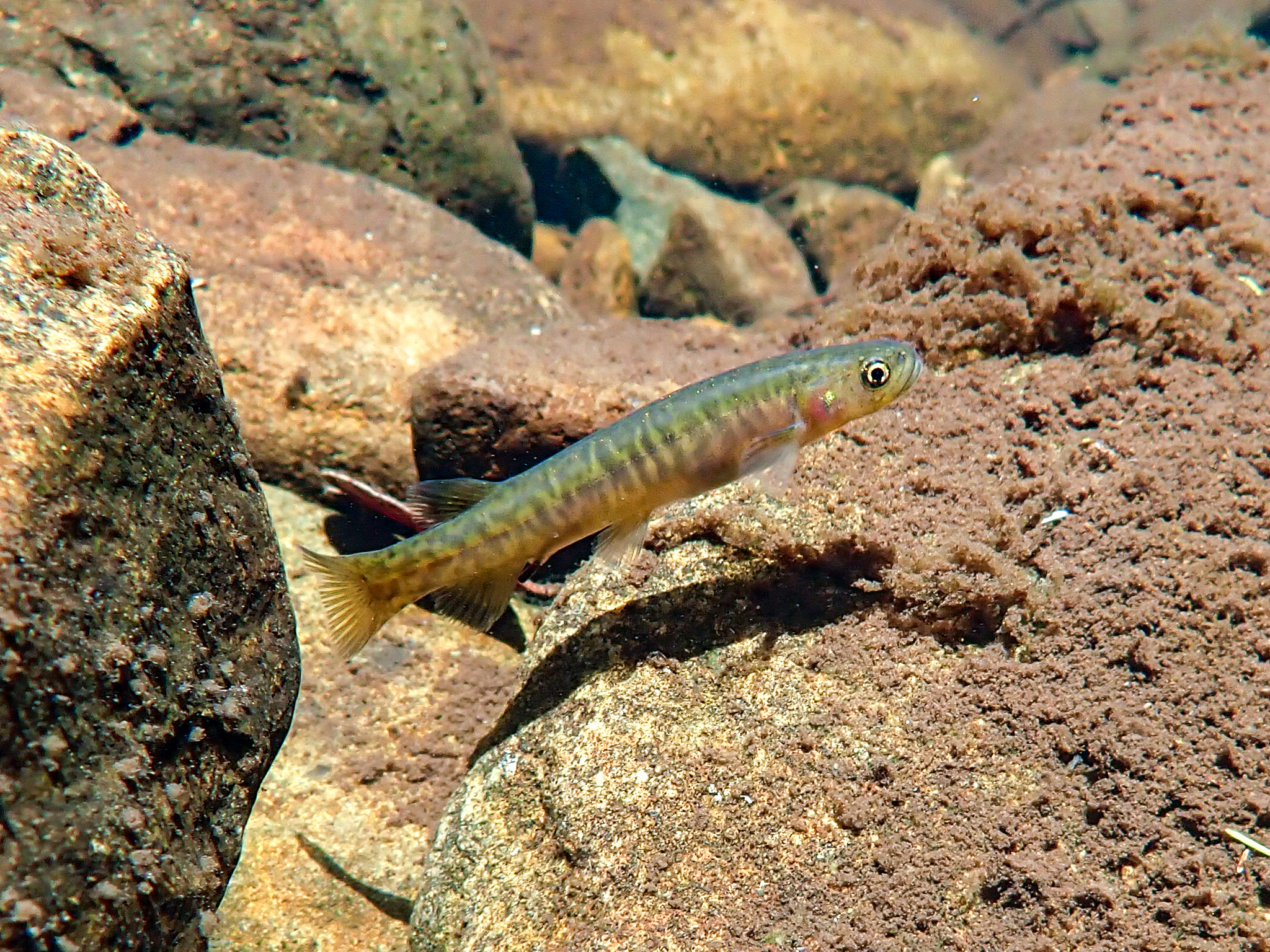

Conservation status
- Endangered (IUCN 3.1)

Scientific classification
- Kingdom: Animalia
- Phylum: Chordata
- Class: Actinopterygii
- Division: Teleostei
- Order: Galaxiiformes
- Family: Galaxiidae
- Genus: Galaxias
- Species: G. fontanus

Binomial name
- Galaxias fontanus Fulton, 1978

= Galaxias fontanus =

Species of fish endemic to Tasmania, Australia

Galaxias fontanus, the Swan galaxias, is a species of fish in the family Galaxiidae. It is endemic to eastern Tasmania, Australia.

The brownish-olive fish is only found in the trout-free headwaters of the Swan and Macquarie River catchments. The streams occupied by the species have a low gradient and shallow waters. Natural populations are very small and fragmented, however the species has been successfully introduced into other predator-free streams.

The fish ranges from 7cm to 13cm and can weigh up to 8 grams. Swan galaxias are carnivores and feed on aquatic and terrestrial insects. The fish have a spawning period is an extended period of time of 3 months within the spring season (typically August and October). The number of eggs that the Swan galaxias lay range from 150 to 550 eggs and have a diameter between 2.2 and 2.5mm.

It is listed as Endangered on the IUCN Red List and Environment Protection and Biodiversity Conservation Act 1999. The primary threat to the Swan galaxias is predation from exotic and introduced species, poor water quality, extreme climatic conditions and human activities such as agriculture and damming. Conservation practices were funded by the World Wide Fund for Nature (WWFN) and the Endangered Species Program of Environment Australia (ESP) to conserve the species population.

== Description ==
Adult Swan galaxias have a length that ranges from 7cm to 13cm and can weigh up to 8 grams. The colouring of the fish changes from a dark olive-green on its back and sides to a white-grey on its stomach. The sides and back form a pale brown speckling with irregular brown bars and patches. It has a medium forked tail fin with its dorsal fin situated above the vent. The pectoral fins span to approximately half the length back towards the pelvic fin and attributed to be relatively small in size. The fins are unblemished. Scales are absent on the fish with its body covered by smooth skin. The head is attributed to be broad and flatish with its eyes located at the dorsal profile.

== Taxonomy ==
The scientific name of the Swan Galaxias is Galaxias fontanus. The species was first discovered by ichthyologist Wayne Fulton in 1978 in Hardings Falls situated on the Swan River in Eastern Tasmania. The swan galaxias is classified as an Actinopteri because its fins have the consistency of skin. The fish is a part of the order galaxiiformes and galaxiidae family as it is a freshwater fish known to be found only in the Southern Hemisphere. Fulton's genus name for the species, fontanus ("fast running"), was derived from Greek mythology, in reference to the rapidly moving river the fish is found in.

== Ecology ==
=== Range ===
The Swan galaxias species is endemic to Eastern Tasmania and only found in freshwater streams within the Swan River catchment. It is commonly found along the headwaters of the Upper Swan River, specifically in small tributaries located upstream. Within the catchment, the Upper Swan River, Blue Tier Creek and Tater Garden Creek have resided natural populations of the Swan galaxias due to the presence of the Hardings waterfall. There are currently nine translocated populations of the fish that have been located within the Swan river.

In 1864, brown trout (Salmo trutta) was introduced into the Swan River catchment and inhabits the downstream tributaries of the Hardings Falls. The brown trout is a predator to the Swan galaxias causing the species to be restricted to headwater areas. Since the introduction of the trout, the historic distribution of the Swan galaxias is unknown. The trout was introduced before the Swan galaxias was discovered and formally described. However, it has been suggested by Fulton that there was a widespread of the Swan galaxias population within the entire river catchment before trout colonisation.

The distribution of the Swan galaxias is listed below as described by fresh water ecologist Scott Hardie (2006).

Location	Distribution
Swan River	Natural
Lower Blue Tier Creek	Natural
Tater Garden Creek	Natural
St Pauls River	Translocated
Dukes River	Translocated
Tullochgorum Creek	Translocated
Cygnet River	Translocated
Coghlans Creek	Translocated
Lost Falls Creek	Translocated
Wye River	Failed translocated
Upper Blue Tier Creek	Translocated
Green Tier Creek	Translocated
Rocka Rivulet	Translocated

=== Habitat ===
Swan galaxias exist exclusively in freshwater streams that lead to large rivers. It is confined to the headwaters of small streams that are inaccessible to introduced species of fish. The streams occupied by the species have a low gradient and shallow waters. They are found in forested areas with rocky pools and instream riparian cover.

Larvae and juveniles are located in schools of open water in slow moving areas of runs and riffles. Adults inhabit slow flowing tide pools with abundant instream and sidestream vegetation cover.

== Feeding ==
Adult Swan galaxias are "opportunistic carnivores" that feed on aquatic and terrestrial species. They specifically eat adult forms of terrestrial insects (typically ants, beetles, grasshoppers and crickets) that fall into the water from the sidestream vegetation. Other prey they routinely feed off is aquatic insects (such as stoneflies, dragonflies and mayflies) and small planktonic crustaceans (such as water fleas, krill and copepods). The larvae and juvenile fish feed off algae found on rocky substances of the stream floor.

== Biology ==
=== Reproduction ===
Reproductive behaviour of the fish species tends to occur in the second year of life typically in April. The fish have a spawning period is an extended period of time of 3 months within the spring season (typically August and October). Spawning occurs in the adult habitat with the deposition of eggs amongst the shallow marginal lotic and lentic rocky environment. The number of eggs that the Swan galaxias lay range from 150 to 550 eggs and have a diameter between 2.2 and 2.5mm. Larval developments prolongs over a 5 week period. Once the larvae reach approximately 35mm in length, adult colouration begins. The maximum lifespan of the Swan galaxias is approximately 3 years.

In aquaculture environments, Swan galaxias' artificially fertilised eggs hatch in temperatures between 11.5 and 18.5 degrees Celsius and have a 17-day incubation period.

== Threats ==
=== Introduced species ===
The primary threat to the Swan galaxias is predation from exotic and introduced species. The introduction of brown trout (salmo trutta) and redfin perch (Perca fluviatilis) has seen a decline in the Swan galaxias population, in which Sanger stated there has been "two localised extinctions in the Swan River due to the predation from these introduced species". The spread of these species has confined the natural population of the Swan galaxias to become fragmented and only present in headwaters of a small number of streams.

=== Dams ===
The threat of damming creeks in which the Swan galaxias inhabits can result in barriers to the species migrations, changes in flow regimes and fluctuations in stream water levels. Dams can also degrade the species spawning habitat as reduced water flow can expose the rocky bottom creek floor in which the Swan galaxias lay their eggs.

=== Water quality and streamside vegetation ===
The clearing of vegetation for farming practices and reductions in water quality caused by urban development present are a threat to the species. Poor water quality and limited streamside vegetation has been attributed to affect the distribution pattern and abundance of the Swan galaxias within the Swan River catchment.

=== Extreme climate ===
Variations in climatic conditions such as flooding and droughts affect the population of the Swan Galaxias. Since the species inhabit small headwater streams, fluctuations in water levels are accredited to threaten the population of the species. Because of the introduced exotic species occupying the downstream, the Swan Galaxias are not able to refuge from floods or droughts that affect the headwaters. In 2011, floods occurred in the Swan River and resulted in the population of the Swan Galaxias to decline by 74%.

== Conservation status ==
=== Classification ===
The Swan galaxias is a threatened species listed as Endangered under a state, national and global level. It was classified as an Endangered species by the IUCN Red list under the Environment Protection and Biodiversity Conservation Act 1999.

The fish was listed as Endangered under the Australian Federal Environment Protection and Biodiversity Conservation Act 1999 (EPBC). In effect under the EPBC Act from 10th of November 2006.

Tasmania has also classified the protection of the fish under the Threatened Species Protection Act 1995 (TSP). The species has also been listed as a 'priority species requiring consideration' under the Tasmanian Regional Forest Agreement 1997. Under this agreement, the species is protected through the Comprehensive, Adequate and Representative reserve system (CAR).

=== Reasons for listing ===
It is listed as Endangered due to the species limited distribution and abundance, habitat destruction and as a result of predatory species. As suggested by the Australian Government, there has been a "decline in the population over the last 10 years and it is continuing decline".

Since the discovery of the fish species, the Swan galaxias' natural distribution has become restricted and fragmented confining three populations to a limited amount of streams and to those extreme headwaters.

The limited abundance of the species has been attributed by Scott Hardie as the consequence of habitat degradation. Habitat degradation includes the impacts of sedimentation and reductions in water quality as a result of urban development, agriculture and forestry practices. As well, the global threat of climate change results in rising water temperatures which results in a loss of water from headwater streams occupied by the Swan Galaxias. As the species requires specific aquatic environments for spawning, the exploitation of water by dams heavily impacts the amount of water present in the Swan Galaxias habitat.

Predation and competition from exotic species has been a reason for the species conservation listing. Since the introduction of the brown trout (salmo trutt) and redfin perch (Perca fluviatilis) there has been a decline in the Swan Galaxias species. Primarily, due to the inability for both species to inhabit the same environment together due to competition and predation.

== Conservation practices ==
In 1987 to 1989, World Wide Fund for Nature provided funds for the Australian Fisheries Management Authority (AFMA) to conduct an in-depth study on the Swan Galaxias. They studied the species life ecology, habitat requirements and their natural distribution patterns. The study concluded a list of areas that the Swan Galaxias naturally inhabits to be claimed as Forestry Tasmania Wildlife Priority Areas. The project aimed to conserve the species by offering management recommendations, which was adopted in the 'Action Plan for Australian Freshwater Fish'. These recommendations have been attributed as a basis for the first recovery plan of the Swan Galaxias which was prepared in 1993.

In 1987, the Swan Galaxias was first introduced to the Blue Tier Creek to test the viability of translocation as a recovery action for the species. At the translocation site, a breeding population was established one year later. The translocation was deemed successful and the species was translocated to Green Tier Creek and Lost Falls Creek in 1991.

In 1989, the Australian Government Department of Agriculture, Water and Environment renovated the existing natural barrier in Blue Tier Creek. The renovation increased the barrier's height and slope to prevent the trout from reaching the Swan Galaxias habitat. Since the barrier was improved, no trout have been sighted upstream of the creek.

The first recovery plan was prepared by Sanger in 1993. It detailed recovery actions to translocate the population and construct artificial barriers to exotic fish. The translocated population was monitored to determine if the population size of the Swan Galaxias increased. The objective of the plan was to create an education campaign and improve the conservation status of the species. The AFMA implemented the recovery actions detailed in the plan and funding was provided by the Endangered Species Program of Environment Australia (ESP). Funding was provided for a five year period.

In 2000 to present, the second recovery plan was actioned to ensure the long term viability of the first recovery plan. It consists of observing the population levels of the twelve populations of Swan Galaxias'. The aim of the plan is to get the Swan Galaxias down listed from Endangered to Vulnerable.
