= Flathead galaxias (Australia) =

Conservation status
- Critically Endangered (IUCN 3.1)

Scientific classification
- Kingdom: Animalia
- Phylum: Chordata
- Class: Actinopterygii
- Order: Galaxiiformes
- Family: Galaxiidae
- Genus: Galaxias
- Species: G. rostratus

Binomial name
- Galaxias rostratus Klunzinger, 1872

Species of fish

The flathead galaxias (Galaxias rostratus) is a freshwater fish found in lowland rivers, streams and associated billabongs, backwaters, and wetlands of the southern Murray-Darling river system in southeastern Australia.

Flathead galaxias continue a pattern of speciation into upland and lowland habitats found in native Murray-Darling fishes. Flathead galaxias are found in lowland habitats, while the mountain galaxias species complex, containing at least fourteen species of Galaxias (research is ongoing) are found in upland habitats, as well as "midland" or upland/lowland transitional habitats.

== Morphology ==
The fish is similar in appearance to the common galaxias, except for a distinctly flattened head, larger eyes and longer snout. It has an olive green back and sides with indistinct grey to green blotches and silvery bottom. Adults are commonly 9 cm (3.5 in) in length, but have been found to be up to 12 cm (4.7 in) long.

== Conservation ==
Serious concerns exist for flathead galaxias. They, along with a number of other small native forage fish, are disappearing from vast tracts of the Murray-Darling basin. The species is considered extinct in South Australia. Along with river regulation, destruction of water clarity and submergent macrophytes ("water weed") by exotic, illegally introduced common carp (Cyprinus carpio) appear to be having a devastating effect on this species. Many or all of the small native forage fish of the southern Murray-Darling system apparently used these weeds beds for shelter, feeding, and spawning sites.
