= Bob McDowall =

New Zealand ichthyologist (1939–2011)

- Born: Robert Montgomery McDowall; 15 September 1939; Palmerston North, New Zealand
- Died: 20 February 2011 (aged 71); Christchurch, New Zealand
- Education: Harvard University
- Awards: Le Cren Medal from the Fisheries Society of the British Isles (2011); James Cook Research Fellowship from the Royal Society of New Zealand (1998
- Scientific career
- Fields: Freshwater fishes, biogeography, taxonomy
- Workplaces: NIWA
- Thesis: The galaxiid fishes of New Zealand (1970)

Robert Montgomery McDowall (15 September 1939 – 20 February 2011) was one of New Zealand's most prominent freshwater ichthyologists.

== Biography ==
McDowall was born on 15 September 1939, the son of dairy scientist Frederick Henry McDowall and entomologist Grace Edith Wall.

He attended Palmerston North Boys' High School and went on to study for a BSc at Victoria University in 1958. Despite only receiving a C pass in Zoology, he was accepted into the graduate programme where he completed an MSc thesis on the biology of the redfin bully.

In 1963, he joined the Fisheries Division of the Marine Department of the Department of Scientific and Industrial Research. At that time, the main laboratories of the Marine Department were housed on the ground floor of the old Wellington City morgue – which McDowall described as an "unhappy and "exceedingly primitive' place with inadequate power and heating.

McDowall's dissatisfaction at the Fisheries Division reached Barry Fell, formerly a professor at Victoria University and then working at the Museum of Comparative Zoology at Harvard University. Fell encouraged McDowall to apply to Harvard and supported his entry. Conveniently, McDowall was then awarded a National Research Fellowship with the condition that he study overseas. He left New Zealand on a small cargo ship with an "entry permit to the United States and Harvard, a good scholarship, an extensive fish collection and a wife of 10 days". There he studied the taxonomy of the galaxiid fishes. His PhD thesis on the systematics and phylogeny of the New Zealand whitebait was praised as one of the best submitted at the time.

He returned to New Zealand and the Fisheries Division in 1968, where he was supposed to be working on the diet of trout. Quietly, he resumed his galaxiid studies, focusing on the ecology of the whitebait species. In 1978 he moved to Christchurch to run the expanding Christchurch freshwater fisheries laboratory, and was promoted to Assistant Director (Freshwater) in 1983. In this role he managed 60 staff around New Zealand, which restricted his research opportunities. Nevertheless, he continued to work on the biology and biogeography of native fishes.

He was made a Fellow of the Royal Society of New Zealand in 1984, as his father had been in 1962.

During his scientific career, McDowall wrote 14 books, as well as 230 papers in 66 different journals. His last book, Ikawai: freshwater fishes in Māori culture and economy, was published in October 2011 following his death on 20 February 2011. He was posthumously awarded the Le Cren Medal by the Fisheries Society of the British Isles in 2011.

Galaxias mcdowalli (McDowall's galaxias) was named after him "for his long and valuable contribution to galaxioid systematics".

== Publications ==
Books:

- New Zealand Freshwater Fishes: a Guide and Natural History. (1978) Heinemann Educational, Auckland. 230 pp.
- (ed.) Freshwater Fishes of South-Eastern Australia (New South Wales, Victoria and Tasmania). (1980) Reed, Sydney. 208 pp.
- Mobil New Zealand Nature Series – Freshwater Fish. (1980) Reed, Wellington. 80 pp.
- Trout in New Zealand Waters: the Biology and Management of Trout in New Zealand’s Lakes and Rivers. (1984) Wetland Press, Wellington. 120 pp.
- The New Zealand Whitebait Book. (1984) Reed, Wellington. 210 pp.
- Diadromy in Fishes: Migrations Between Freshwater and Marine Environments. (1988) Croom Helm, London. 308 pp.
- New Zealand Freshwater Fishes: a Natural History and Guide. (1990) Heinemann Reed, Auckland. 553 pp.
- Gamekeepers for the Nation: the Story of New Zealand’s Acclimatisation Societies 1861-1990. (1994) Canterbury University Press, Christchurch. 508 pp.
- (ed.) Freshwater Fishes of South-Eastern Australia. (1996) Reed, Sydney. 247 pp.
- The Reed Field Guide to New Zealand Freshwater Fishes. (2000) Reed, Auckland. 225 pp.
- The Reed New Zealand Nature Series - Freshwater Fishes of New Zealand. (2001) Reed, Auckland. 95 pp.
- McDowall, R. M.; Allibone, R. M.; Chadderton, W. L.: Falkland Islands Freshwater Fishes: a Natural History. (2005) Falklands Conservation, London. 102 pp.
- New Zealand Freshwater Fishes: an Historical and Ecological Biogeography. (2010) Springer, Dordrecht. 449 pp.
- Ikawai: Freshwater Fishes in Maori Culture and Economy. (2011) Canterbury University Press, Christchurch. 872 pp.

== See also ==
- Category:Taxa named by Bob McDowall
