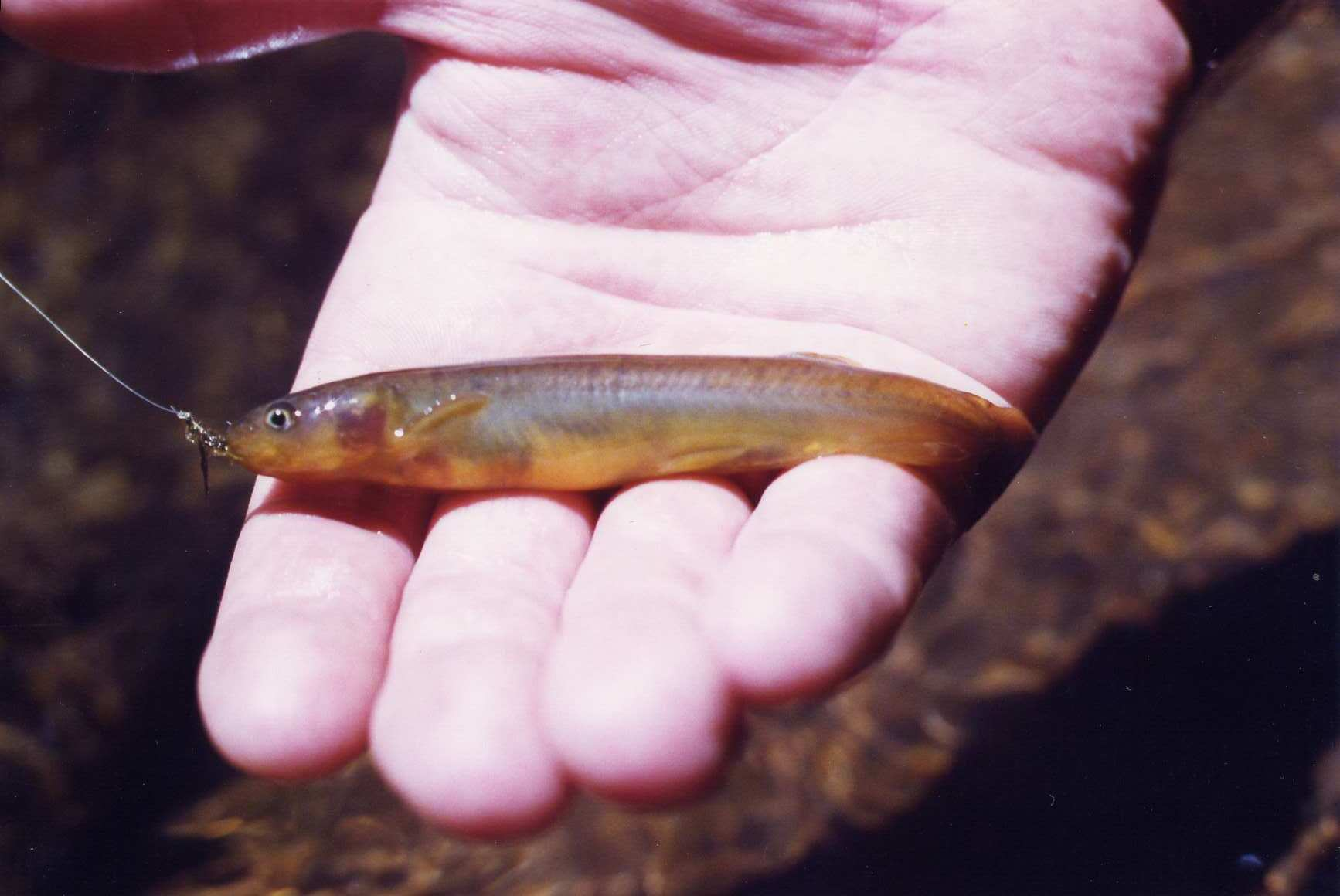
- A mountain galaxias (Galaxias olidus)

Scientific classification
- Kingdom: Animalia
- Phylum: Chordata
- Class: Actinopterygii
- Division: Teleostei
- Cohort: Euteleostei
- Order: Galaxiiformes
- Family: Galaxiidae; Bonaparte 1832

Genera
- See text

= Galaxiidae =

Galaxiidae Temporal range: Early Miocene to present Possible Maastrichtian occurrence

Family of mostly small freshwater fish

The Galaxiidae are a family of mostly small freshwater fish in the Southern Hemisphere. The majority live in Southern Australia or New Zealand, but some are found in South Africa, southern South America, Lord Howe Island, New Caledonia, and the Falkland Islands. One galaxiid species, the common galaxias (Galaxias maculatus), is probably the most widely naturally distributed freshwater fish in the Southern Hemisphere. They are coolwater species, found in temperate latitudes, with only one species known from subtropical habitats. Many specialise in living in cold, high-altitude upland rivers, streams, and lakes.

Some galaxiids live in fresh water all their lives, but many have a partially marine lifecycle. In these cases, larvae are hatched in a river, but are washed downstream to the ocean, later returning to rivers as juveniles to complete their development to full adulthood. This pattern differs from that of salmon, which only return to fresh water to breed, and is described as amphidromous.

Freshwater galaxiid species are threatened, some gravely, by exotic salmonid species, particularly trout species, which prey upon galaxiids and compete with them for food. Exotic salmonids have been introduced by humans to many different land masses (e.g. Australia, New Zealand), with little apparent thought as to ecological impacts on native fish. Numerous localised extinctions of galaxiid species have been caused by the introduction of exotic salmonids, and a number of freshwater galaxiid species are threatened with overall extinction by exotic salmonids.

== Evolution ==
Phylogenetic evidence alternatively places galaxiids within the Protacanthopterygii, or more recently as the sister group to the Neoteleostei. Their ancestors are thought to have diverged from the neoteleosts around the Triassic-Jurassic boundary.

The earliest definitive fossils of galaxiids are from the Miocene of New Zealand, which can be placed in the extant genus Galaxias. This young fossil range contrasts with the presumed ancient origins of the group. In 1998, a possible Late Cretaceous (Maastrichtian) galaxiid from South Africa was described as Stompooria. However, later studies have questioned this assignment, as Stompooria differs from galaxiids in many morphological traits, especially in the presence of scales, although it being an ancestral galaxiid that had not yet developed galaxiid traits could not be ruled out. Other taxonomic treatments have instead placed Stompooria as part of an extinct clade sister to the Esociformes and Salmoniformes.

Many galaxiid genera show an unusual form of sister group relationship to one another, where a genus in Australasia is more closely related to a genus in South America than to other genera from the same continent. An example is the relationship between the South American Aplochiton and the Australian Lovettia. It is thought that the evolution of galaxiids may have been influenced by the Antarctic land bridge between Australia and South America, which served as a shallow marine and fresh water connection that allowed different galaxiid taxa to disperse between both continents.

== Taxonomic diversity ==
About 50 species are in the family Galaxiidae, grouped into seven genera:

=== Genera ===
- ?†Stompooria Anderson, 1998 (Maastrichtian of South Africa; assignment disputed, possibly a stem-salmoniform)
- Subfamily Aplochitoninae Begle 1991
  - Genus Aplochiton Jenyns 1842 [Haplochiton Agassiz 1846; Farionella Valenciennes 1850 ex Cuvier & Valenciennes 1850] (two species)
  - Genus Lovettia McCulloch 1915 (one species)
- Subfamily Galaxiinae [Paragalaxiinae Scott 1936]
  - Genus Brachygalaxias Eigenmann 1928 (two species)
  - Genus Galaxias Cuvier 1816 [Saxilaga Scott 1936; Galaxias (Agalaxis) Scott 1936; Agalaxis (Scott 1936); Lyragalaxias Whitley 1935; Austrocobitis Ogilby 1899; Mesites Jenyns 1842 non Schoenherr 1838 non Geoffroy 1838; Nesogalaxias Whitley 1935] (34 species)
  - Genus Galaxiella McDowall 1978 (four species)
  - Genus Neochanna Günther 1867 [Saxilaga (Lixagasa) Scott 1936; Lixagasa (Scott 1936); Saxilaga Scott 1936] (six species)
  - Genus Paragalaxias Scott 1935 [Querigalaxias Whitley 1935] (four species)

=== Species by geography ===
==== Australia ====
Galaxiids are found around the south eastern seaboard of Australia and in some parts of south western Australia. The galaxiids and the temperate perches (Percichthyidae) are the dominant native freshwater fish families of southern Australia. Species common to all areas include:

- Common galaxias or jollytail galaxias, Galaxias maculatus
- Spotted galaxias, spotted mountain trout, or spotted minnow, Galaxias truttaceus

South east Australian mainland

- Climbing galaxias, Galaxias brevipinnis
- Mountain galaxias, Galaxias olidus
- Flathead galaxias, Galaxias rostratus

Threatened species are:

- Galaxias fuscus (Victoria), also called barred galaxias or brown galaxias
- Dwarf galaxias, Galaxiella pusilla (South Australia, Victoria)
- Tasmanian mudfish, Neochanna cleaveri (Wilsons Promontory, Victoria)

Western Australia

- Western galaxias, Galaxias occidentalis
- Mud minnow, Galaxiella munda
- Black-stripe minnow, Galaxiella nigrostriata

Tasmania Seventeen species of galaxiids have been found in Tasmania. The most common species are:

- Climbing galaxias, Galaxias brevipinnis
- Common galaxias, Galaxias maculatus
- Spotted galaxias, Galaxias truttaceus

Tasmanian endangered species include:

- Saddled galaxias, Galaxias tanycephalus
- Pedder galaxias, Galaxias pedderensis
- Swan galaxias, Galaxias fontanus
- Swamp galaxias, Galaxias parvus
- Golden galaxias, Galaxias auratus
- Dwarf galaxias, Galaxiella pusilla
- Clarence galaxias, Galaxias johnstoni
- Tasmanian mudfish, Neochanna cleaveri
- Western paragalaxias, Paragalaxias julianus
- Great Lake paragalaxias, Paragalaxias eleotroides
- Arthurs paragalaxias, Paragalaxias mesotes
- Shannon paragalaxias, Paragalaxias dissimilis

==== New Zealand ====
Twenty-three species of galaxiids have been discovered in New Zealand, and prior to the introduction of non-native species such as trout, they were the dominant freshwater fish family. Most of these live in fresh water all their lives. However, the larvae of five species of the genus Galaxias develop in the ocean, where they form part of the zooplankton and return to rivers and streams as juveniles (whitebait), where they develop and remain as adults. All Galaxias species found in New Zealand are endemic, except for Galaxias brevipinnis (koaro) and Galaxias maculatus (inanga).

- Roundhead galaxias, Galaxias anomalus
- Giant kōkopu, Galaxias argenteus
- Climbing galaxias, koaro, or short-fin galaxias, Galaxias brevipinnis
- Lowland longjawed galaxias, Galaxias cobitinis
- Flathead galaxias, Galaxias depressiceps
- Dwarf galaxias, Galaxias divergens
- Eldon's galaxias, Galaxias eldoni
- Banded kōkopu, Galaxias fasciatus
- Gollum galaxias, Galaxias gollumoides
- Dwarf inanga, Galaxias gracilis
- Bignose galaxias, Galaxias macronasus
- Common galaxias, inanga, or common jollytail, Galaxias maculatus
- Alpine galaxias, Galaxias paucispondylus
- Shortjaw kokopu, Galaxias postvectis
- Longjawed galaxias, Galaxias prognathus
- Dusky galaxias, Galaxias pullus
- Common river galaxias or Canterbury galaxias, Galaxias vulgaris
- Brown mudfish, Neochanna apoda
- Canterbury mudfish, Neochanna burrowsius
- Black mudfish, Neochanna diversus
- Northland mudfish, Neochanna heleios
- Chatham mudfish, Neochanna rekohua

==== South America ====
- Aplochiton taeniatus (Chile, Argentina, Falklands Islands)
- Common galaxias or puyen, Galaxias maculatus (Chile, Argentina, Falkland Islands)
- Brachygalaxias bullocki (Chile)
- Brachygalaxias gothei (Chile)
- Galaxias globiceps (Chile)
- Galaxias platei (Chile)

==== South Africa ====
- Cape galaxias, Galaxias zebratus (Cape Province, South Africa)

== Fishing ==
The juveniles of those galaxiids that develop in the ocean and then move into rivers for their adult lives are caught as whitebait while moving upstream and are much valued as a delicacy. Adult galaxiids may be caught for food, but they are generally not large. In some cases, their exploitation may be banned (e.g. New Zealand) unless available to indigenous tribes.

In addition to serious impacts from exotic trout species, Australian adult galaxiids suffer a disregard from anglers for being "too small" and "not being trout". This is despite the fact that several Australian galaxiid species, though smallish, grow to a sufficient size to be catchable and readily take wet and dry flies, and that one of these species — the spotted galaxias — was keenly fished for in Australia before the introduction of exotic trout species. A handful of fly-fishing exponents in Australia are rediscovering the pleasure of catching (and releasing) these Australian native fish on ultralight fly-fishing tackle.
