= Dharawal National Park =

National park in New South Wales, Australia

- IUCN category II (national park)
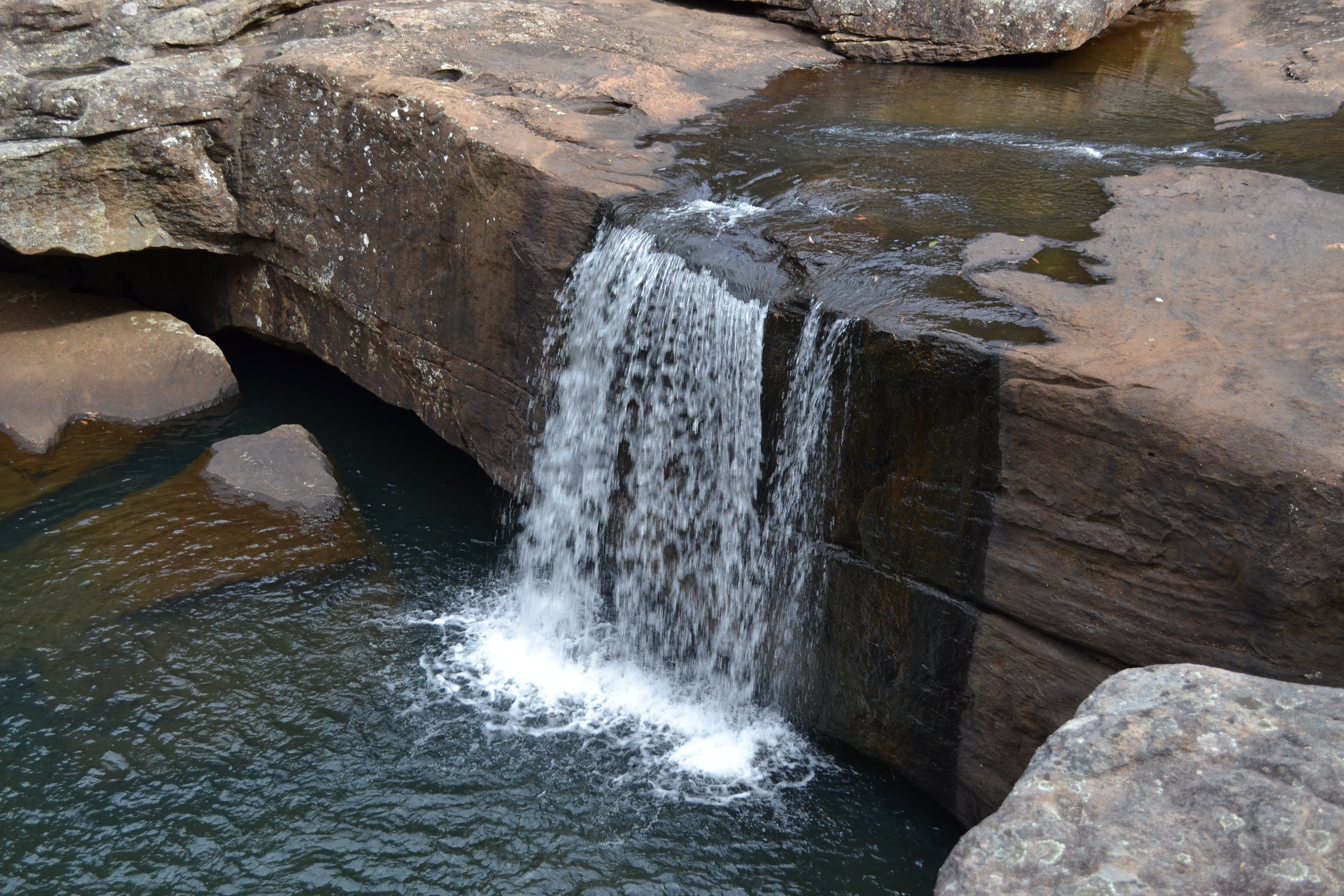
- Waterfall, Dharawal National Park

- Location within New South Wales
- Location: New South Wales
- Nearest city: Appin
- Coordinates: 34°12′12″S 150°51′39″E
- Area: 65.08 km^{2} (25.13 sq mi)
- Established: 26 March 2012
- Governing body: NSW National Parks & Wildlife Service
- Website: Official website

The Dharawal National Park is a protected national park in the Illawarra region of New South Wales, in eastern Australia. The 6,508-hectare (16,080-acre) national park is situated between the Illawarra Range and the Georges River and is approximately 45 kilometres (28 mi) south west of Sydney. There are three entry points to the park: from the east through Darkes Forest; from the north through Wedderburn; and from the south through Appin.

The national park covers almost both the O’Hares and Stokes Creek catchments. It contains significant biodiversity and ecosystems and Aboriginal culturally significant sites. It has high conservation significance within the region, especially due to the low disturbance within the park and limited public access. The landscape varies from gorges and waterfalls to upland swamps to sandstone woodland, rainforests, and eastern gully forests. The residents of the park include koalas, wallabies, wallaroos, platypuses, potoroos, pygmy possums and many more animal species.

The conservation objectives of the park are to maintain the natural and cultural heritage, provide education and research opportunities as well as providing some recreation activities.

== Etymology and indigenous heritage ==
The name Dharawal refers to the indigenous Dharawal community, which has lived in the area for more than 15,000 years. The Dharawal once occupied the area from the southern shores of Botany Bay, south to the Shoalhaven River, and northwest to Camden. The park is within the Tharawal and the Illawarra Aboriginal Land Councils areas. There are many archaeological sites within the Dharawal National Park and surrounding region, estimated at 15,000 over the Woronora Plateau. The rock art found at these sites consists of drawings, paintings, and stencils created with black charcoal, white clay, or red, yellow, or orange ochre. Within the national park approximately 236 sites that have been found.

== History ==
In 1927 the O’Hares Creek Catchment was proclaimed a 'water catchment' in connection with the supply of water by the Metropolitan Water, Sewerage and Drainage Board. In 1978, the Sydney Metropolitan Water Sewage and Drainage Board decided that the catchment would not be used for water supply, and so the Government of New South Wales proposed creating a state recreation area over the catchment. Due to conflicting government interest, it took until 1996 before the catchment area was declared a nature reserve and state recreation area. As a result of the National Parks and Wildlife Act, 2001 passed by New South Wales, all state recreation areas became state conservation areas.

The distinction between Dharawal Nature Reserve and Dharawal State Conservation Area was due to coal mining being allowed in the state conservation area. Dharawal Nature Reserve was categorised by the International Union for Conservation of Nature as a category Ia Strict Nature Reserve and the Dharawal State Conservation Area was categorised as a category VI Protected area with sustainable use of natural resources.

On 26 March 2012 most of the Dharawal State Conservation Area was declared a national park with a residual of three areas of state conservation area remaining on the western side and center of the national park to allow ongoing mining operations The government waited for its last mining exploration licence with BHP to expire before making the announcement. The national park status has meant that there are now much greater restrictions on activities such as coal mining within the protected area although in 2012 BHP was reported as continuing mining exploration in Darkes Forest, just outside the park’s border. The area is said to be protected to the centre of the earth which in theory means that no more mining activities can take place.

== Region description ==
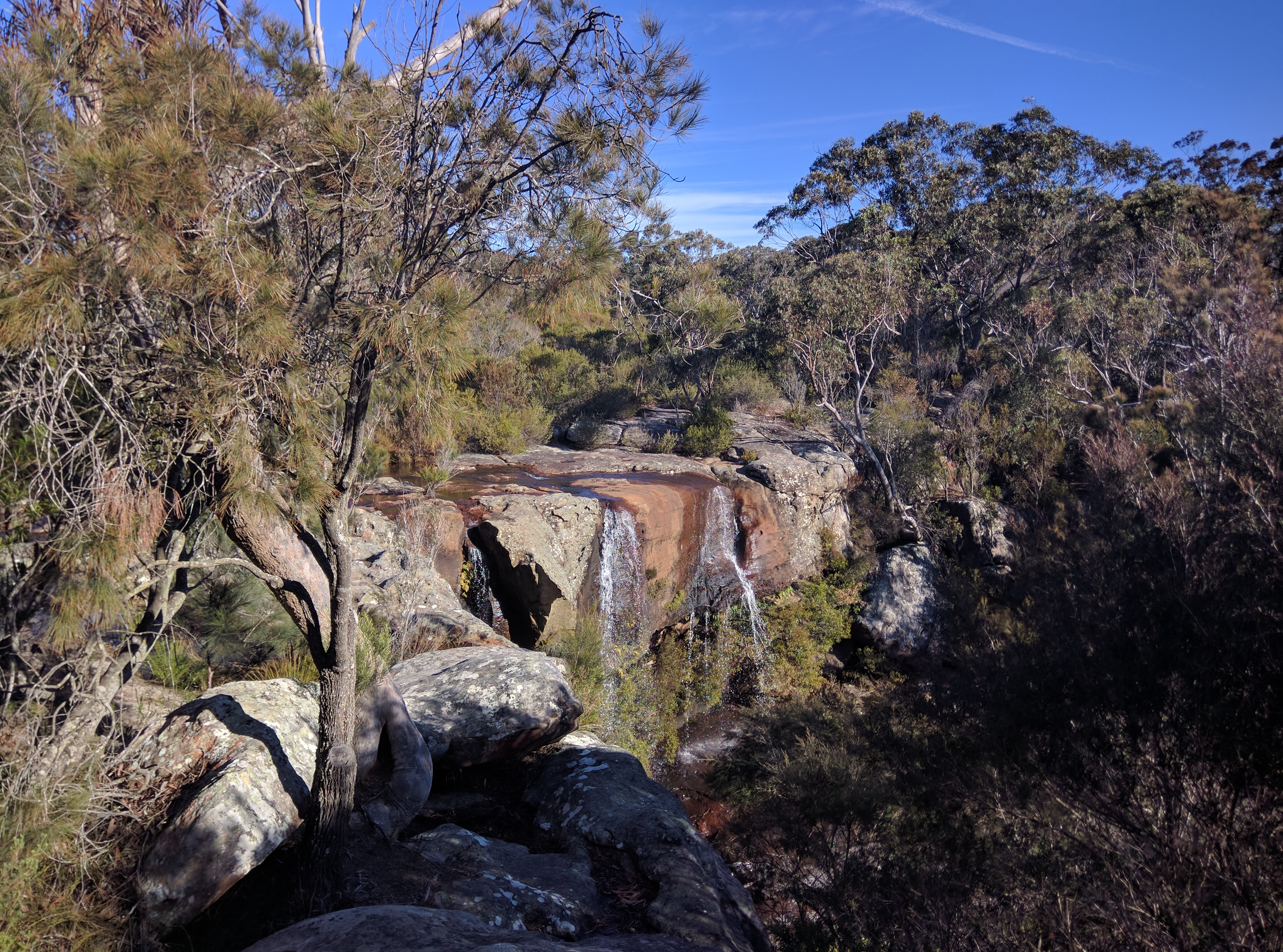
Madden's Falls in Dharawal National Park

The Dharawal National Park is located on the southern rim of the Sydney Basin. The Woronora plateau gently slopes northwest towards the Cumberland Plain. The majority of the Dharawal region is located within the Nepean Ramp sub-region of the plateau, with a small portion in the west being part of the Macdonald region. The Dharawal National Park forms part of a larger protected area, which includes Royal National Park located in the north, the Budderoo and Morton national parks in the south and the extensive UNESCO World Heritage–listed Greater Blue Mountains Area in the west and northwest. Combined, these protected areas are one of the largest within the state of New South Wales.

The Dharawal sites consist of the catchment of the O’Hares and Stokes Creeks, which are the headwaters of the Georges River on the Woronora Plateau. The annual average discharge of the catchment streams is estimated at 40,000 megalitres (8.8×10^{9} imp gal; 11×10^{9} US gal). There are many waterways within the park, totalling over 200 kilometres (120 mi) and including 26 swamps, draining towards the Nepean and Georges rivers.

The plateau predominantly consists of Triassic Hawkesbury Sandstone, which is largely quartzose sandstone with some shale and ironstone. The soil in the park is generally shallow, sandy and of low fertility. The park is prone to high and extreme erosion threats. There are 13 vegetation communities in the park, among which sandstone woodland and eastern gully forest dominate. Orchards and hobby farms surround park on the east and west.

The region's climate is classified as temperate with temperatures ranging in the winter months from 6 to 27 °C (43 to 81 °F) in the summer months. The average annual rainfall varies from 850 to 1,550 millimetres (33 to 61 in).

== Biology and ecology ==
The park is a region of high species diversity, especially the upland swamps, which are considered to be the most species-rich in the world for shrub/sedge vegetation. They contain over 140 plant species. These upland swamps have experienced no significant changes in the last 17,000 years and thus, are of great scientific importance as well as being listed as an endangered ecological community. Additionally, Stokes and O’Hares Creeks are classified as protected waters and the waters connected to O’Hares Weir are classified as Specially Protected Waters. This signifies that either no or very little discharges can occur within these waters. The park is of regional significance, having preserved local and diverse ecosystems and habitats that in other surrounding areas have been either damaged or destroyed.

=== Flora ===
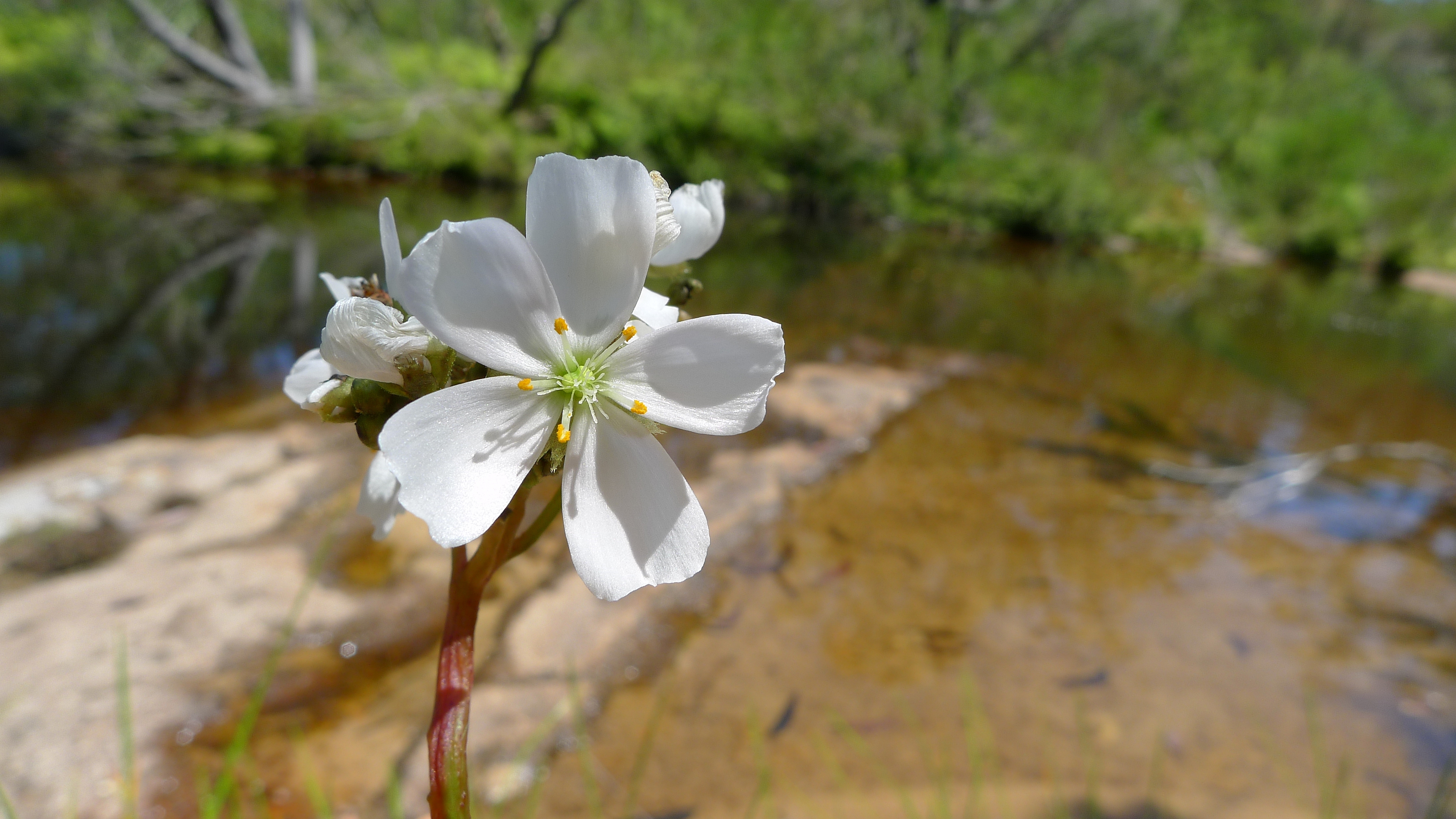
Forked sundew (Drosera binata) in Dharawal National Park

The two dominant vegetation communities, sandstone woodland and eastern gully forest, have species compositions very different from that of the same communities in other areas. The species richness of dry sclerophyll forests, dry sclerophyll woodlands and heathlands are greater than in similar coastal communities within NSW. There are also vegetation communities which are not well represented in other existing Sydney sandstone conservation areas. The O’Hares Creek Shale Forest community, which has a low population density, and the black cypress pine of the Woronora Plateau, which is disconnected from other populations, are both classified as endangered.

Of the 510 recorded vascular plant species in the region, Persoonia hirsuta and Acacia bynoeana are listed as endangered and Acacia baueri ssp. aspera, Leucopogon exolasius, Pultenaea aristata and Melaleuca deanei are listed as vulnerable. Another 14 species are listed as rare or threatened native plants. A further 24 species are considered regionally significant due to being uncommon, and the park is important for eleven others as it is their southernmost habitat within the region.

=== Fauna ===
128 birds, 39 reptiles, 32 mammals, 23 frog, 5 fish, 2 crayfish, 1 shrimp, 1 freshwater mussel and 273 invertebrate species have been recorded in the park. Of these fauna, 23 vertebrate species are listed as threatened. Other species considered rare either generally or within the region are platypus (Ornithorhynchus anatinus), dusky antechinus (Antechinus swainsonii), greater glider (Petaurus breviceps), wombat (Vombatus ursinus), eastern grey kangaroo (Macropus giganteus), wallaroo (Macropus robustus), red-necked pademelon (Thylogale thetis), red-necked wallaby (Macropus rufogriseus) and peregrine falcon (Falco peregrinus). The largest population of koalas (Phascolarctos cinereus) in southern Sydney are found in Wedderburn, which is located in and around the park. Their breeding habitat runs along the creek lines of the O’Hares Creek and Georges River starting from the Stokes creek junction to north of Kentlyn. Koalas are endangered, and their population is in decline. The eastern pygmy possum, found in the park, is listed as vulnerable. There are also some regionally significant frog and reptile populations found in the park, including the giant burrowing frog (Heleioporus australiacus) and the great barred frog (Mixophyes fasciolatus). The broad-headed snake (Hoplocephalus bungaroides) and the red-crowned toadlet (Pseudophryne australis) inhabit exfoliated rock on the sandstone plateaus. This is a habitat that has been dramatically degraded and fragmented in other Sydney regions but which is relatively undisturbed within the park. Bushrock collection, usually for garden use, is considered to be a key threatening process for the snake and toadlet as they use the rocks for shelter. There are non-native fauna species found within the protected area include feral cats and dogs, rabbits, foxes, black rat, deer and mosquito fish.

The following species are of high priority as most of their habitats are in the Woronora Plateau: broad-headed snake (Hoplocephalus bungaroides), Littlejohn’s tree frog (Litoria littlejohni), spotted-tailed quoll (Dasyurus maculatus), large-footed myotis (Myotis macropus), east-coast free-tailed bat (Mormopterus norfolkensis), green tree frog (Litoria caerulea), grey-headed flying fox (Pteropus poliocephalus) and the southern emu-wren (Stipiturus malachurus). These species suffer from a variety of threats, chiefly habitat loss. The park is considered to be critical to the regional conservation of the beautiful firetail (Stagonopleura bella), tawny-crowned honeyeater (Gliciphila melanops), Rosenberg’s goanna (Varanus rosenbergi), and the eastern three-lined skink (Bassiana duperreyi).

Diverse freshwater fish species are found within creeks in the park, including the Macquarie perch (Macquaria ambigua), which is a threatened species. The freshwater species Cox’s gudgeon (Gobiomorphus coxii), long-finned eel (Anguilla reinhardtii), climbing galaxias (Galaxias brevipinni) and the Sydney (Euastacus australasiensis) and spiny crayfish (Euastacus spp.) are also found in the park.

== Environmental threats ==
=== Pests ===
Fifty plant species found in the park are considered introduced species. Most weed populations are found where there has been human activity, such as along roads, abandoned quarries, or on park boundaries. Significant weeds found in parts of the park are crofton weed (Ageratina adenophora), pine trees, and pampas grass (Cortaderia selloana), which is an easy proliferator. Many weeds are present outside the boundaries of the park, which present the threat of invasion. Some of these are gorse (Ulex europaeus), fireweed (Cotoneaster glycophylla), broad and narrow-leaf privet (Ligustrum spp.), Scotch thistle (Cirsium vulgare) and cassia (Senna pendula).

In total, there are seven species of introduced mammals and four introduced bird species within the park. Foxes and feral dogs are a threat to koalas, and Feral cats and foxes are a real danger to many threatened species within the Upland Swamp region. Bats are especially vulnerable to feral cat predators. Feral cats, foxes and mosquito fish (Gambusia affinis) have been listed as creating key threatening processes (predation, competition and vegetation alteration) under the Threatened Species Conservation Act, 1995 (NSW). Chytrid fungus infecting frogs and feral deer causing environmental degradation (such as trampling and accelerating erosion), are also considered to cause threatening processes.

=== Catchment ===
The water extraction licenses issued in the park's catchment have the potential to reduce flow further down the catchment. Five weirs have been constructed within creeks in the park. These weirs exclude certain native fish from being able to reach creeks within the reserves, therefore preventing these fish from being able to complete their lifecycle.

=== Mining ===
Coal mining exploration has occurred in the park, which has caused cracking in creek beds as well as some damage to slopes and rocks. Stream flows have been altered due to cracking, which can lead to alterations in aquatic habitats and impacting on linked species. Cracking caused to the streams can be to such an extent as producing water loss. Management trails have previously been created using coal wash waste, which can be easily transported into the streams during rain events. This can cause alkaline conditions and can have a negative effect on flora and fauna.

=== Fires ===
Wildfires are a threat to flora and fauna within the park, and require fire protection and management, especially for areas such as core koala-breeding habitat. Threats of arson have also been made, both outside and within the park. Arson and accidental fires from bushwalkers have been the main reason for bushfires within the park.

== Management ==
The park management is trying to protect and conserve the park’s natural and cultural heritage in the most natural state possible. It places emphasis on maintaining a healthy and high yielding rainfall catchment. Upland swamps are also important due to the rare species they contain, and so have been classified as a Priority Fauna Habitat. The park management also helps conserve area outside the park perimeter. The management is also rehabilitating areas disturbed by invasive species with a focus on sedgeland – Health Complex, heath woodland, ironstone woodland and ironstone heath. Maintenance of rare, threatened and endangered flora and fauna is a priority along with maintaining diversity and regenerating areas, which have been disturbed.

Weeds that are a threat to the native vegetation communities are controlled within the park as well as controlling weeds on neighbouring lands. These include whisky grass (Andropogon virginicus), African love grass (Eragrostis curvula) and Rhodes grass (Chloris gayana). The populations of foxes, feral dogs and cats, and deer, which are all introduced fauna, are annually controlled. Using coal wash waste has been banned within the park. Fire management includes reducing fuel within the park, ensuring that fences are well maintained so as to prevent arson, as well as prescribed burning. Soil erosion and sediment movement is being repaired, especially in the upland swamp region and the Hawkesbury and Maddens Plains Soil Landscape Units. Water quality in the catchment is being monitored and there is some action towards limiting water pumping from streams, when there is little or no flow available.

== See also ==
- Protected areas of New South Wales
