= Pōrangahau River =

River in New Zealand

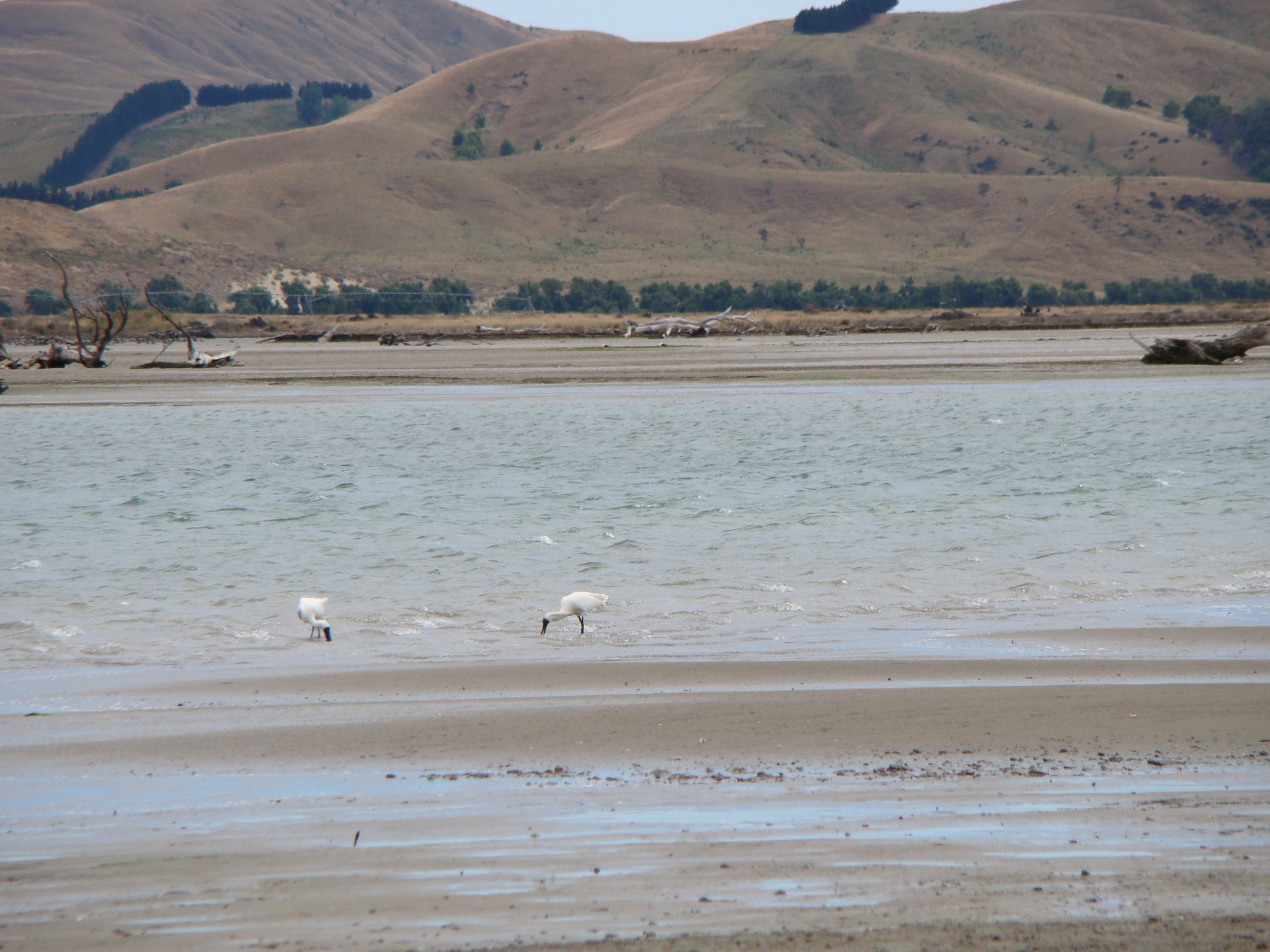
- Royal spoonbills at the Pōrangahau Estuary
- Route of the Pōrangahau River
- Mouth of the Pōrangahau River Pōrangahau River (North Island)
- Native name: Tāurekaitai (Māori)

Location
- Country: New Zealand
- Island: North Island
- Region: Hawke's Bay
- District: Central Hawke's Bay

Physical characteristics
- Source: Confluence of Taurekaitai Stream and Little Kokomoko Stream
  - coordinates: 40.2260°S 176.6005°E
- Mouth: Pōrangahau Estuary
  - coordinates: 40°17′19″S 176°39′46″E
  - elevation: Sea level
- Length: 35 km (22 mi)
- Basin size: 697 km^{2} (269 sq mi)
- Discharge
  - location: State Highway 52
  - average: 2.406 m^{3}/s (85.0 cu ft/s)

Basin features
- Progression: Pōrangahau River → Pōrangahau Estuary → Pacific Ocean
- River system: Pōrangahau River Catchment
- Cities: Pōrangahau
- Tributaries
  - left: Sixty Pound Stream
  - right: Mangawhero Stream, Mangangārara Stream, Mangaorapa Stream, Mangamaire Stream
- Bridges: Wilder Road Bridge, Saleyards Bridge (Porangahau Road), Abercromby Street Bridge, Makaramu Bridge / Estuary Bridge (Beach Road)

The Pōrangahau River (also known locally to Māori as the Tāurekaitai River) runs 35 kilometres (22 mi) through southern Hawke's Bay in New Zealand.

== Course ==
The origin of the river Pōrangahau River Catchment is in the coastal hill country southwest of Hawke's Bay. The river forms at the convergence of Taurekaitai Stream and Little Kokomoko Stream near Oakburn. The river winds through rugged hill country north of Cape Turnagain, flowing past the township of Pōrangahau before emptying into the Pacific Ocean. The river opens into the Pōrangahau Estuary, inside which is an island called Bird Island.

== Geography and ecology ==
The river drains a catchment area of 697 km^{2} (269 sq mi) with a mean annual flow of 2.406 m^{3}/s (85.0 cu ft/s) near State Highway 52. The catchment area consists mainly of highly erodible soft sedimentary geology used for pastoral farming.

The river and its estuary support native New Zealand fish species, including longfin and shortfin eels, inanga, common smelt, common bully, redfin bully, and giant bully.

== See also ==
- List of rivers of New Zealand
