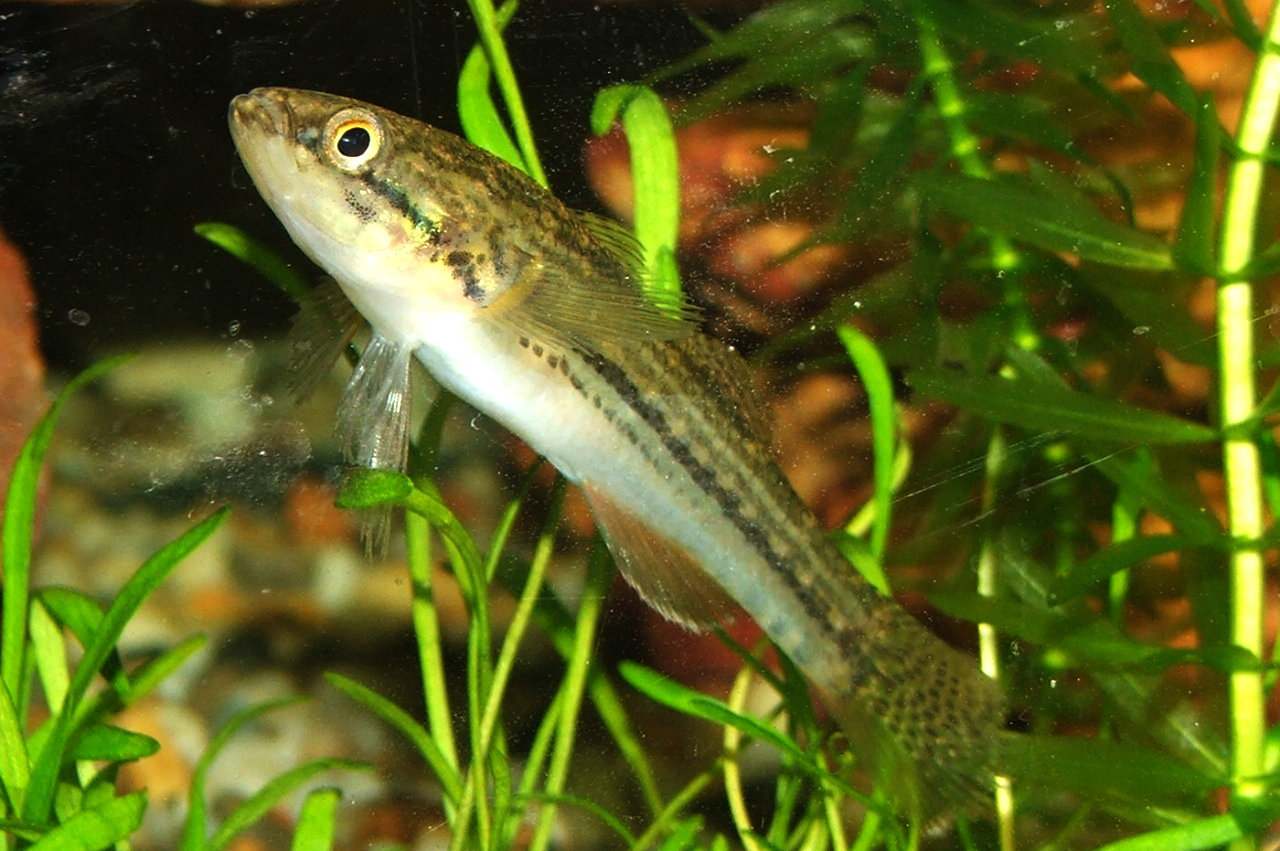

Conservation status
- Least Concern (IUCN 3.1)

Scientific classification
- Kingdom: Animalia
- Phylum: Chordata
- Class: Actinopterygii
- Division: Teleostei
- Order: Gobiiformes
- Family: Eleotridae
- Genus: Gobiomorphus
- Species: G. australis

Binomial name
- Gobiomorphus australis (Krefft, 1864)

Synonyms
- Eleotris australis Krefft, 1864

= Gobiomorphus australis =

Species of fish

Gobiomorphus australis, the striped gudgeon, is a species of freshwater ray-finned fish belonging to the family Eleotridae, the spinycheek sleepers or bullies. This species is found in eastern Australia.

== Taxonomy ==
Gobiomorphus australis as first formally described as Eleotris australis in 1864 by the Australian artist and [[[naturalist]] Gerard Krefft with its type locality given as creeks near Sydney, Hawkesbury River and tributaries, Hunter River and Clarence River, Australia. This species is classified in the genus Gobiomorphus which was described in 1863 by the American naturalist Theodore Gill with Eleotris gobioides designated as its type species. The genus Gobiomorphus is classified in the family Eleotridae, which is classified within the suborder Gobioidei, the gobies, of the order Gobiiformes, which also includes the cardinalfishes and sand divers.

== Etymology ==
Gobiomorphus australis is classified in the genus Gobiomorphus, this name being a combination of gobio, a small fish of little value, a gudgeon, with morphius, meaning "having the shape of". This repeats the meaning of the specific name of the type species, goboides. The specific name of the striped gugeon, australis, means of "southern", thought to be a reference to this species being endemic to Asutralia.

== Description ==
Gobiomorphus australis reaches a amximum total length of 18 cm (7.1 in), althougha total length of 12 cm (4.7 in) is moretypical. There are 6 or 7 spines in the first dorsal fin, 1 spine and 8 soft rays in both the second dorsal fin and the anal fin. The striped gudgeon is a small, elongate but ribust fish with a tapering body and a large head. It has a small mouth wich reaches back to a point level with the front of the orbit. The second dorsal fin is a little bit taller than the first dorsal fin. The background colour ranges from brown to grey on the upper body fading to cream or grey on the underside. There are between 5 and 7 dark stripes on the flanks, and a dark stripe running back from the eye. The base of the pectoral fin base is crossed by a white bar, and there is a dark spot on its upper base. The firstan dsecond dorsal fins and the caudal fin have rows of brown spots.

== Distribution and habitat ==
Gobiomorphus australis is endemic to eastern Australia where it occurs from the Pioneer River near Mackay, Queensland, to eastern Victoria, and formerly to South Gippsland, near Welshpool, Victoria. The striped gudgeon can be found in a wide variety of habitats from clear streams with rapid currents to muddy stillwaters such as ponds and waterholes.Froese, Rainer; Pauly, Daniel (eds.). "Gobiomorphus australis". FishBase. June 2018 version.</ref> Juveniles are common in estuaries near rocks, submerged logs and among vegetation. They are good climbers and are able to clamber over wet rocky surfaces such as rapids and waterfalls.

== Biology ==
Gobiomorphus australis is a carnivorous species which preys on a wide range of prey including aquatic insects, molluscs and crustaceans. The spawn in the late austral summer when the water reaches 21°C. The eggs are laid in one uniform, compactlayer on the solid surfaces of rocks and logs, or similar. The male guards and keeps the water moving over the nest by fanning until the larvae hatch after around four days. The larvae are free-swimming and are taken downstream by the current into estuaries.
