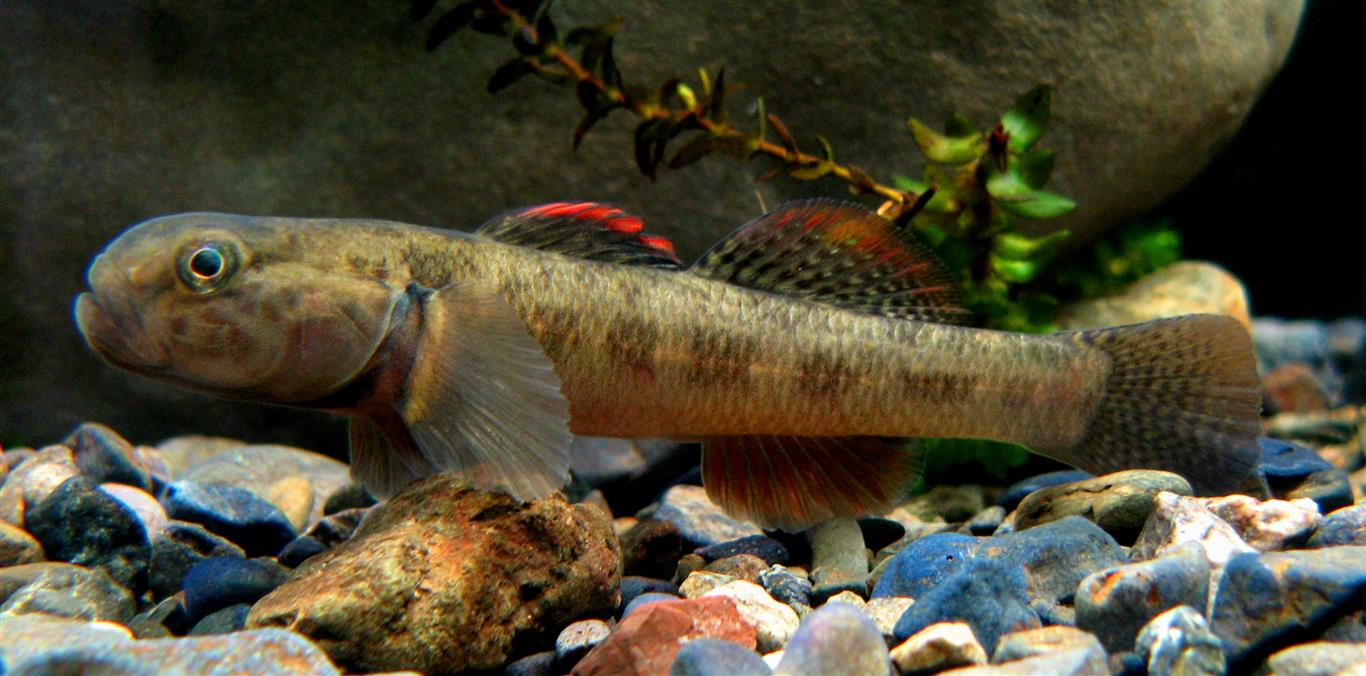
- Male Cran's bully

Conservation status
- Least Concern (IUCN 3.1)

Scientific classification
- Kingdom: Animalia
- Phylum: Chordata
- Class: Actinopterygii
- Division: Teleostei
- Order: Gobiiformes
- Family: Eleotridae
- Genus: Gobiomorphus
- Species: G. basalis

Binomial name
- Gobiomorphus basalis (J. E. Gray, 1842)

Synonyms
- Eleotris basalis J. E. Gray, 1842

= Cran's bully =

Species of fish

Cran's bully (Gobiomorphus basalis) is a species of freshwater ray-finned fish belonging to the family Eleotridae, the spinycheek sleepers or bullies. This species is endemic to the North Island of New Zealand.

== Taxonomy ==
Cran's bully was first formally described as Eleotris basalis in 1842 by the British zoologist John Edward Gray with its type locality given as "River Thames", i.e. Waihou River, Coromandel, New Zealand. This species is classified in the genus Gobiomorphus which was described in 1863 by the American naturalist Theodore Gill with Eleotris gobioides designated as its type species. The genus Gobiomorphus is classified in the family Eleotridae, which is classified within the suborder Gobioidei, the gobies, of the order Gobiiformes, which also includes the cardinalfishes and sand divers.

== Etymology ==
Cran's bully is classified in the genus Gobiomorphus, this name being a combination of gobio, a small fish of little value, a gudgeon, with morphius, meaning "having the shape of". This repeats the meaning of the specific name of the type species, goboides. The specific name of the Cran bully, basalis, means "at the base", a reference to the wide yellow band at the base of the pectoral fins.

== Description ==
Cran's bully reaches a maximum total length of 9 cm (3.5 in). This species has a big head and big eyes with a blunt snout. Both sexes are sandy-brown to brownish-olive, although the adult males, have the distal margin of the first dorsal fin coloured a bright pinkish-orange.

== Distribution and habitat ==
Cran's bully is endemic to the North ISland of New Zealand, although there is a gap in its distribution to the northeast of Lake Taupō, thought to be a result of an eruption of 1800 years before present, as these fishes do not have a marine phase then they cannot naturally recolonise a watershed once extirpated. This fish occurs in streams and rivers with mixed types of beds. It can be very numerous in spring creeks as well as low to medium gradient streams with moderate flow. Cran's bully is not a migrant species and is commonly found at mid-altitude sites and quite far inland. It appears to be able to tolerate a wide range of conditions from partially degraded through to apparently untouched habitats.

== Biology ==
Cran's bully can live up to 8 years, becoming sexually mature at 1 year and it has a generation time of 4 years. Spawning occurs in the spring and summer, the males set up a territory under a rock where the female lays her eggs in a single layer, which the male probably guards. A few hundred eggs are deposited, these hatch after several weeks and the larvae grow in stream edges and backwaters.
