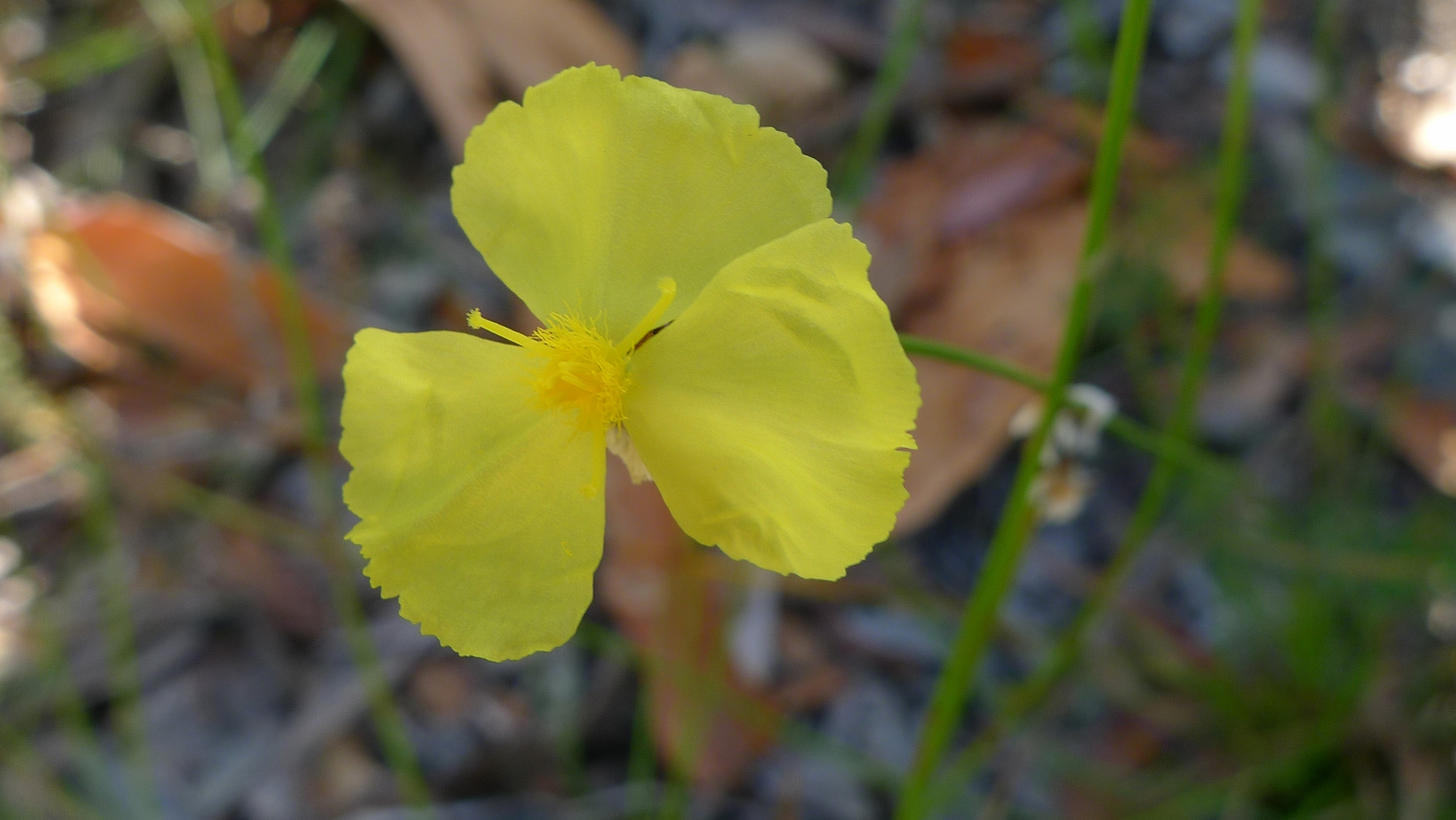
- Dharawal National Park Australia

Scientific classification
- Kingdom: Plantae
- Clade: Tracheophytes
- Clade: Angiosperms
- Clade: Monocots
- Clade: Commelinids
- Order: Poales
- Family: Xyridaceae
- Genus: Xyris
- Species: X. bracteata

Binomial name
- Xyris bracteata R.Br.

Synonyms
- Xyris gracilis subsp. laxa O.D.Evans; Xyris operculata var. bracteata (R.Br.) Benth.

= Xyris bracteata =

Species of yelloweyed grass

Xyris bracteata is a yellow-eye which grows in dry or wet heath, or in open eucalyptus woodland with a heath understorey. Only found in eastern New South Wales, Australia, it is a robust erect herb, growing up to 60 cm high. This is one of the many plants first published by Robert Brown, with the type known as "(J.) v.v.", appearing in his Prodromus Florae Novae Hollandiae et Insulae Van Diemen in 1810. The specific epithet bracteata is derived from Latin, meaning "having bracts."
