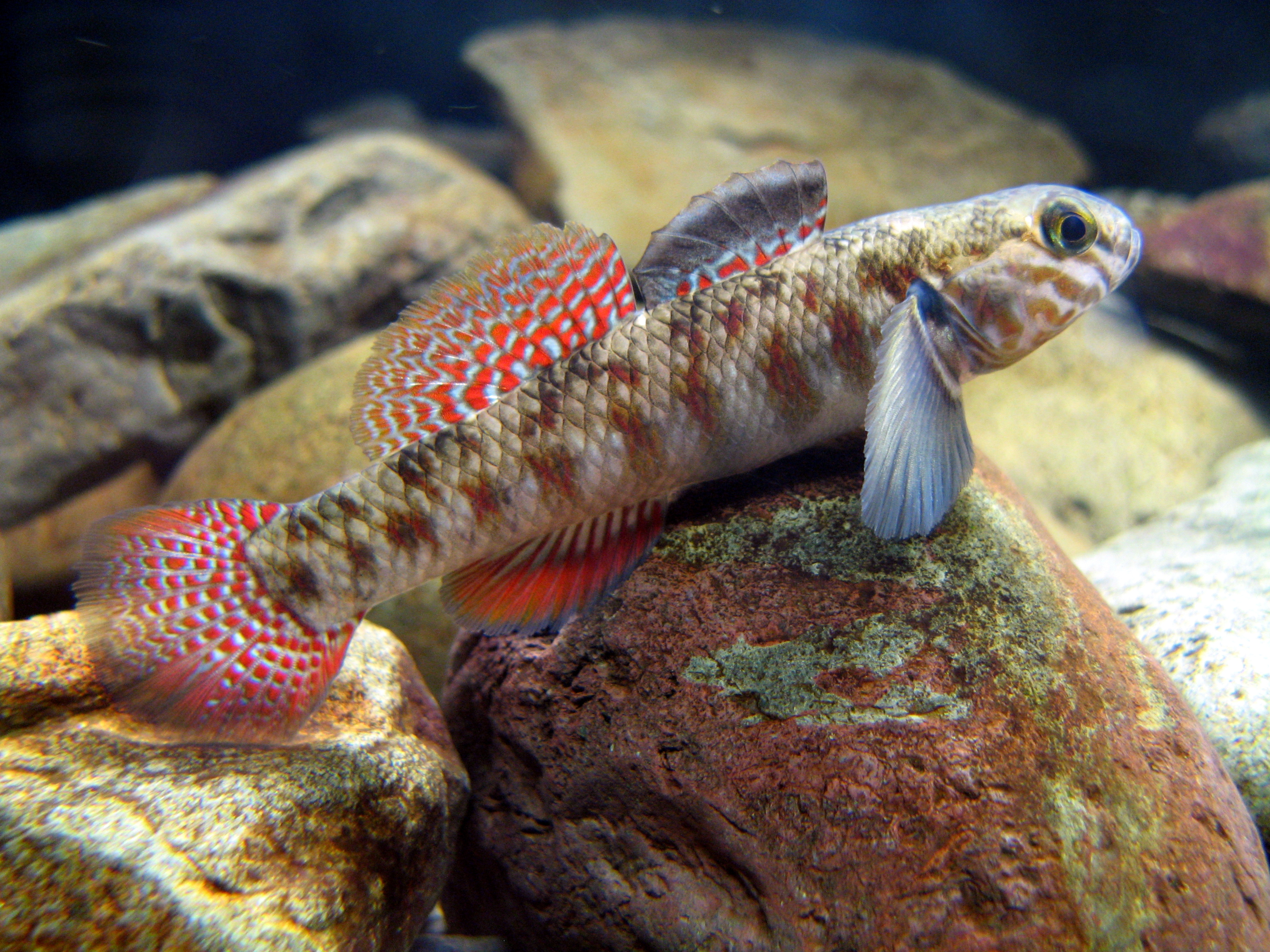
- Male redfin bully

Conservation status
- Near Threatened (IUCN 3.1)

Scientific classification
- Kingdom: Animalia
- Phylum: Chordata
- Class: Actinopterygii
- Division: Teleostei
- Order: Gobiiformes
- Family: Eleotridae
- Genus: Gobiomorphus
- Species: G. huttoni

Binomial name
- Gobiomorphus huttoni (J. D. Ogilby, 1894)
- Approximate known distribution (in orange) of the redfin bully on a map of New Zealand

Synonyms
- Eleotris huttoni J. D. Ogilby, 1894

= Redfin bully =

Species of fish

The redfin bully (Gobiomorphus huttoni) is a species of freshwater fish in the family Eleotridae endemic to New Zealand. Being amphidromous, it spends part of its life cycle at sea. Males have distinctive bright red patterns and stripes on their fins. Adults grow to an average of 80–100 mm (3.1–3.9 in) total length, with a maximum of 120 mm (4.7 in).

== Description ==
G. huttoni was recognised as a distinct species in 1894, but has had many name changes. The current specific name "huttoni" refers to New Zealand biologist Sir Frederick W. Hutton. This is one of seven species of native bullies found in a range of freshwater habitats in New Zealand.

Male redfin bullies are the most colourful freshwater fish in New Zealand, with bright red markings on the dorsal, anal, and tail fins, as well as the body and cheeks. Additionally, males have a bluish-green stripe on the outer edge of the first dorsal fin. Only the males have the red colouring; the females have the same patterns, but with brown in place of red. Redfin bullies of both sexes have distinctive diagonal stripes on their cheeks. These stripes are useful for positive identification, as they are visible in small (about 30 mm long) and very pale fish. During breeding the male fish turns a solid black colour with a bright green edge to the first dorsal fin.

G. huttoni are considered to be cryptic fish, as their colouration enables them to camouflage and blend with their surroundings, which is an important defence mechanism.

G. huttoni reaches a length of 120 mm. The male redfin bullies are generally larger than females. The common weight of G. huttoni is 8.4g ±0.4g.

A research study by Vanderpham undertook a series of body and fin measurements, and cephalic dorsal head pores of the mechanosensory lateral-line system were counted on the G. huttoni. The pores and associated canal neuromasts are important for prey detection and predator avoidance, particularly in habitats with turbulent conditions where the effectiveness of superficial neuromasts may be compromised. Habitat-related patterns of variation in the lateral-line system of the common bully are also likely to reflect patterns observed in redfin bullies occupying similar habitats.

As with most bully species, G. huttoni are nocturnal. While young fry may be seen during the day, adults are largely nocturnal and will dart to cover if disturbed.

== Distribution and habitat ==
G. huttoni is endemic to New Zealand, and found throughout the North Island, Stewart Island and the Chatham Islands. G. huttoni are quite rare along the east coast of the South Island north of Oamaru, with the exception of the Banks Peninsula area. G. huttoni are diadromous as they migrate between fresh and saltwater. They do not establish in landlocked waterways, and thus they tend to live near the coast with access to the ocean. They have the ability to climb upstream, resulting in populations being found well inland, including above 5m.

G. huttoni are typically found in habitats with cobbled bottoms, swift water flows and riffles from large rivers. They can also be found in runs and pools of small bouldery streams, and in urban areas. The preferred habitat of G. huttoni has a high proportion of native forest in the surrounding catchment. Dense canopy cover is not essential; however, the native forest provides cooler water temperatures, as well as additional nutrients to oxygenate the water.

== Life cycle ==
Redfin bullies are amphidromous – they migrate between fresh water and the sea as part of their life cycle.

All of the native bully species are cave spawners. Spawning for G. huttoni takes place in fresh water. Normally during spring, the male establishes a 'nest' or territory within a cave-like structure - usually a hollow beneath a rock or log. The male changes colour, darkening from brown to completely black, to increasingly camouflage with its habitat while defending the nest. When a female is ready to lay eggs, she enters the nest and turns upside-down to lay 1,000–20,000 oval eggs in a close-packed, single layer attached to the nest's 'ceiling'. The male then fertilises the eggs. The female leaves the eggs in the care of the male, who guards them until the larvae hatch two to four weeks later, temperature-dependant. Females may lay eggs more than once over the spawning season, and one male may defend the eggs of more than one female. A male G. huttoni who is defending eggs may exhibit territorial and aggressive behavior while waiting for the larvae to hatch.

After hatching, the 3mm G. huttoni larvae, or fry, are swept downstream by the current to sea. Several months later, when G. huttoni have grown to approximately 15-20mm juveniles, they travel upstream to fresh water and live the rest of their lives in fresh water. Redfin bullies seem obliged to spend their first few months at sea because no landlocked populations have been found. Additionally, the saltwater marine environment provides a greater number of the smaller food groups the larvae to consume. Juvenile G. huttoni have the best climbing ability of the Gobiomorphus species, but are still mostly found in lowland waterways.

G. huttoni reach sexual maturity in their second year. The average lifespan of G. huttoni is approximately three to four years.

== Territorial behaviour ==
G. huttoni demonstrate territorial behaviour, which is promoted by the patchy stream environments they inhabit. This behaviour is mainly attributable to food competition, where dominant individuals will occupy high-quality patches, and as long as stable high-quality food sources are present in the patch, the territorial behaviour will persist. G. huttoni demonstrate a preference for habitat patches with both abundant food resources and a lower risk of predation.

Male and female G. huttoni show differences in preferred habitat selection, specifically preceding or during breeding periods. Male G. huttoni are likely to select a patch near the rock nest that they are protecting, while the females have more mobility in patch selection as they do not have to protect the egg sac. Differences in habitat selection by sex have been found to drive differences in diet, although within the same habitat male and female G. huttoni diets are indistinguishable.

== Diet and foraging ==
G. huttoni is an opportunistic feeder, eating the larvae of chironomid midges, mayflies, and caddisflies; small crustaceans; and aquatic snails.

G. huttoni are carnivorous and eat a variety of invertebrates. G. huttoni display non-random foraging patch selection, preferring patches with cobble and a high abundance of invertebrates. They feed on insects (refer to table below), with their diet dependent upon the species of invertebrates found in the stream they are inhabiting.

Male G. huttoni may also eat some of the eggs that the female has spawned while they are protecting the eggs. Male G. huttoni also eat more gastropoda and ostracoda than female G. huttoni. Female G. huttoni show a preference for Diptera (flies), Ephemeroptera (mayflies) and Amphipoda, with the variation in diet predominantly due to habitat difference, which mainly occurs during the breeding season. The diet of G. huttoni is also dependent upon the size of the fish, as shown in the table below.

Diet of G. huttoni
Size of fish	Diet composition
Smaller than 30mm	Diptera (flies) 67%, Amphipda (malacostracan crustaceans) 14%, Potamopyrgus (Mud snails) 4%, Deleatidium (may fly) 2-3%, Hydrobiosis (caddisflies) 2-3%, Ostracoda (seed shrimp) 2-3%, Oxyethira (Axehead caddis) 2-3%
30 - 39mm	Diptera (flies) 68%, Amphipda (malacostracan crustaceans) 14%, Potamopyrgus (mud snails) 4%, Deleatidium (may fly) 2-3%, Hydrobiosis (caddisflies) 2-3%, Ostracoda (seed shrimp) 2-3%, Oxyethira (axehead caddis) 2-3%
40 – 49 mm	Diptera (flies) 61%, Amphipda (malacostracan crustaceans)14%, Potamopyrgus (mud snails) 4%, Deleatidium (mayflies) 2-3%, Hydrobiosis (caddisflies) 2-3%, Ostracoda (seed shrimp) 2-3%, Oxyethira (axehead caddis) 2-3%
50 - 59mm	Diptera (flies) 60%, Deleatidium (mayflies)11%, Amphipda (malacostracan crustaceans) 14% Potamopyrgus (mud snails) 4%, Hydrobiosis (caddisflies) 2-3%, Ostracoda (seed shrimp) 2-3%, Oxyethira (axehead caddis) 2-3%
60 – 69 mm	Diptera (flies) 39%, G. huttoni eggs 20%, Deleatidium (mayflies) 13%, Ostracoda (seed shrimp) 10%
Larger than 69mm	Diptera (flies) 28%, Deleatidium (mayflies) 23%, Oxyethira (axehead caddis) 13%, Ostracoda (seed shrimp) 12%, Potamopyrgus (mud snails) 8%

The importance of Diptera as a food source remains high irrespective of the size of G. huttoni individuals, but their diet becomes more varied as they grow. G. huttoni less than 30mm in length were found to eat more Diptera (flies), with these accounting for up 67% of their diet, with Amphipda second most frequent at 14%. The food source order of importance is relatively consistent for G. huttoni up to 60mm in length, but as the fish grow beyond this the proportion of diet sourced from Deleatidium (mayflies), Ostracoda (seed shrimp) and Oxyethira (axehead caddis) increases. Research into the diet of G. huttoni by McDowall also highlighted that larger fish, 60-69mm, had a diet which included eggs from their own species.

The differences in diet observed in varying fish sizes is likely due to the larger fish being able to devour larger invertebrates. The dietary differences are also likely related to variations in habitat for redfins of various sizes. G. huttoni larvae and juveniles are more prevalent in ocean water, as they are unable to travel upstream to fresh water. However, when G. huttoni reach adulthood at around two years they are able to reside upstream in freshwater habitats, then gaining access to different food sources.

== Threats ==
The main threats to G. huttoni are competition and predation from introduced salmonid fishes, mainly brown trout (Salmo trutta), and habitat loss. From 2004 to 2014, redfin bully numbers declined by 20%, and they are now classified as a near-threatened species.

The following species have overlapping habitat ranges with G. huttoni; however, there has been limited research undertaken to date to fully understand the scale of the predator-prey relationship.

- Brown trout (Salmo trutta)
- Long fin eel (Anguilla dieffenbachii)
- Giant kōkopu (Galaxias argenteus)
- Banded kōkopu (Galaxias fasciatus)
- White-faced heron (Notophyox novaehollandiae)
- Sacred kingfisher (Halycon sanctus vagans)
- Black-backed gull (Larus dominicanus)
- Black shag (Phalacrocorax)

The mature adult G. huttoni exhibit secretive habits to make concerted predation by trout unlikely, but the more open-living juveniles traversing upstream are more likely to be predated by trout in large numbers. In addition to secretive habits, G. huttoni use short sharp darting movements to get away from disturbances and potential predators.

The table below summarises some of the recent changes to the G. huttoni habitat that are threatening the species, and potential mitigants and management to reduce the ongoing environmental impact:

G. huttoni threats
Threat	Mitigation and/or management
Modification of riparian margins and destruction of riparian vegetation.	Maintain corridors of riparian vegetation along waterway banks. Corridors should be as extensive as possible. If possible, expand width of riparian zones during later rotation planting. Exclude livestock from riparian areas, and control deer and goats that could enter riparian areas.
Eutrophication (high nutrients)	Eutrophication can be prevented by stopping the discharge of municipal and industrial sewage directly into water reservoirs or ground water. Management of fertilizers by farmers to reduce runoff into streams and waterways
Artificial barriers to upstream migration (e.g. culverts, fords with large lips creating a drop off).	Provide adequate fish passage through any artificial barriers within streams (e.g. building up downstream side of culverts with Gabion baskets of boulders, or using alternate designs. Manage or prevent water obstruction from critical habitat areas.
Introduction of invasive aquatic weeds and species.	Prevent introduction of exotic fish. Prevent introduction of aquatic weeds. Educate local users of weed threats and how to prevent spread.
