= Gudgeon (fish) =

Common name for several species of fish

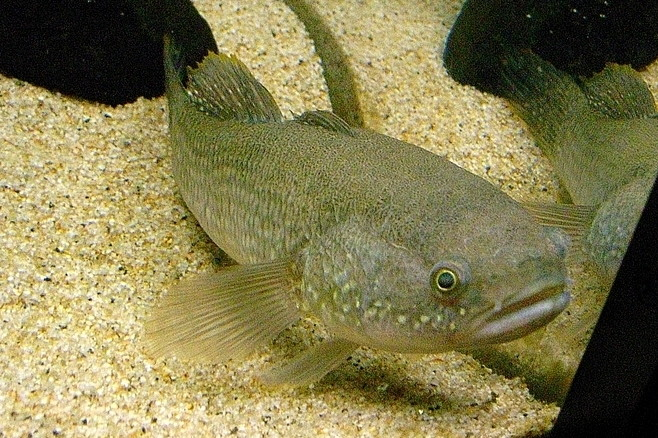
Giuris margaritacea

Gudgeon is the common name for a miniature barbel and a number of small freshwater fish of the families Butidae, Cyprinidae, Eleotridae or Ptereleotridae. Most gudgeons are elongate, bottom-dwelling fish, many of which live in rapids and other fast moving waters; however, many can be found in still waters.

== Families ==
- Cyprinidae – Various cyprinid gudgeons, members of the subfamily Gobioninae (e.g. genera Gobio, Romanogobio), are found in lakes and rivers throughout Europe. Most commonly gudgeon refers to the species Gobio gobio. This is a rheophilic and schooling species that occurs both in river and lake habitats across continental Europe and the United Kingdom. G. gobio feeds on a variety of invertebrates. This gudgeon is an easy fish to catch for beginners. A British angler caught a record 5 ounce gudgeon in 1990 on the River Nadder, Wiltshire.
- Eleotridae – Known commonly as gudgeons, many species in the family Eleotridae are also called sleeper gobies. Unlike gobies, Eleotridae gudgeons have paired ventral fins rather than a fused ventral fin. In Australia, gudgeons from the family Eleotridae are widespread and are popular for aquariums.
- Ptereleotridae – Gudgeons in the family Ptereleotridae are primarily marine species and are often associated with tropical coral reefs.

== Etymology and culinary usage ==
The French word for gudgeon, goujon, gave rise to the English culinary term goujon, used for small pieces of fish or chicken fried in oil, as in chicken goujons. The French word derives from Latin gobio(n-), from gobius, meaning "goby".

== Gallery ==
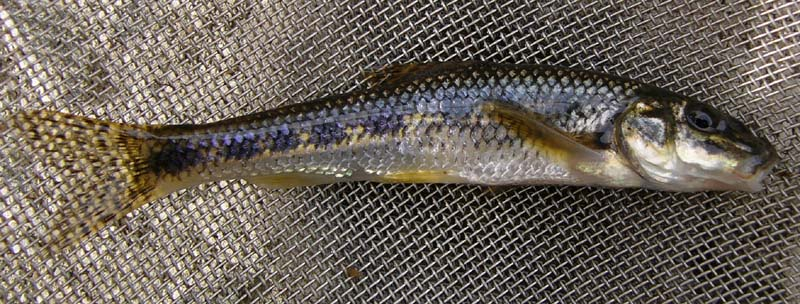
Gobio gobio, the gudgeon

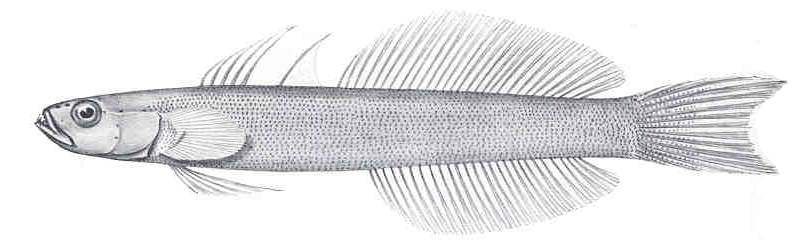
Blue gudgeon, Ptereleotris microlepis
