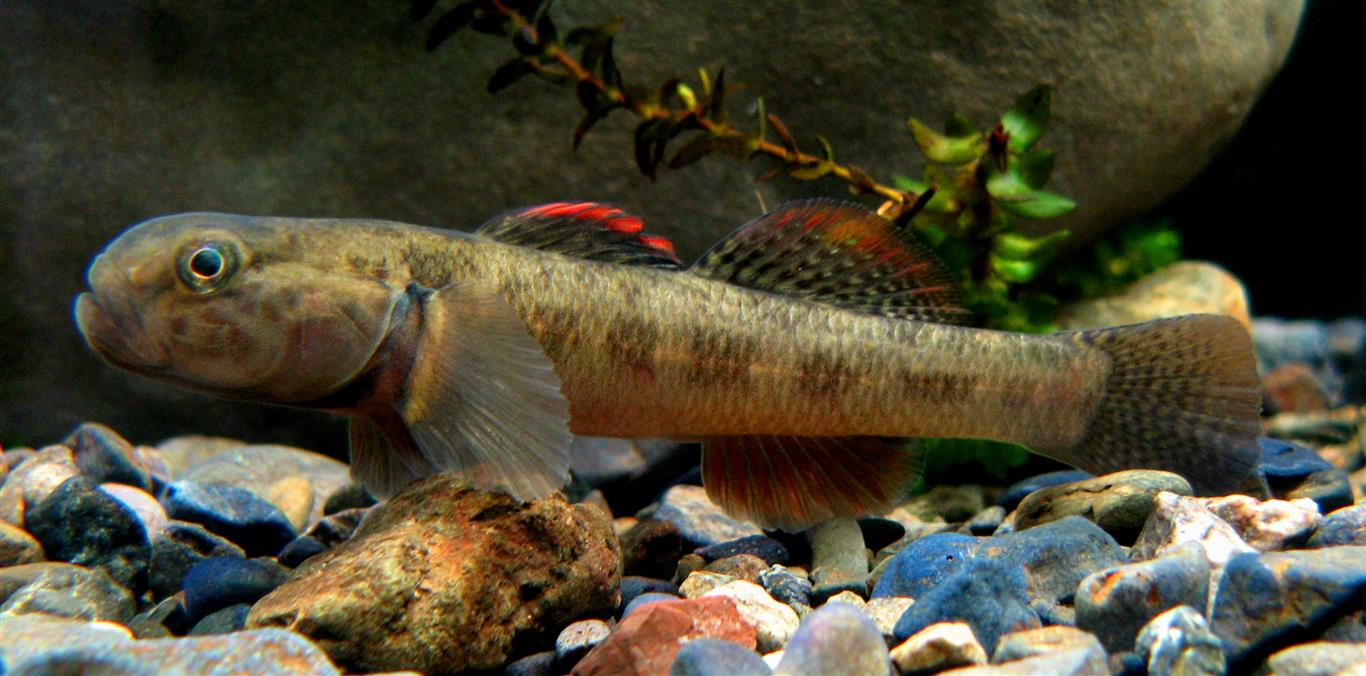
- Gobiomorphus basalis

Scientific classification
- Kingdom: Animalia
- Phylum: Chordata
- Class: Actinopterygii
- Order: Gobiiformes
- Family: Eleotridae
- Genus: Gobiomorphus; T. N. Gill, 1863

Type species
- Eleotris gobioides Valenciennes, 1837

= Gobiomorphus =

Genus of fish

Gobiomorphus is a genus of fishes in the family Eleotridae native to New Zealand and Australia. They are typically small, benthic fishes with large, rounded fins and two dorsal fins. Many have an amphidromous lifecycle: the eggs are laid in fresh water, but the fry are dispersed to sea soon after hatching, and grow there for several months before returning to fresh water.

Articulated fossil skeletons of an indeterminate Gobiomorphus were previously identified from the Early Miocene of New Zealand (St. Bathans fauna of Bannockburn Formation). However, more recent studies have found these to represent a distinct genus, Mataichthys, which was significantly larger than Gobiomorphus. However, small-sized fossil otoliths from the same deposits, if not those of juvenile Mataichthys, could potentially represent those of Gobiomorphus.

== Species ==
The recognized species in this genus are:

- Gobiomorphus alpinus (Stokell, 1962) (Tarndale bully)
- Gobiomorphus australis (Krefft, 1864) (striped gudgeon)
- Gobiomorphus basalis (Gray, 1842) (Cran's bully)
- Gobiomorphus breviceps (Stokell, 1939) (upland bully)
- Gobiomorphus cotidianus (McDowall, 1975) (common bully)
- Gobiomorphus coxii (Krefft, 1864) (Cox's gudgeon)
- Gobiomorphus gobioides (Valenciennes, 1837) (giant bully)
- Gobiomorphus hubbsi (Stokell, 1959) (bluegill bully)
- Gobiomorphus huttoni (Ogilby, 1894) (redfin bully)
