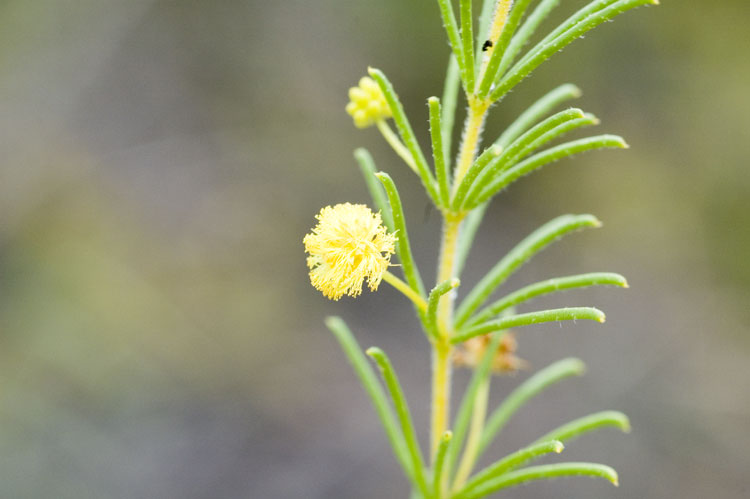
- In Yuraygir National Park

Scientific classification
- Kingdom: Plantae
- Clade: Tracheophytes
- Clade: Angiosperms
- Clade: Eudicots
- Clade: Rosids
- Order: Fabales
- Family: Fabaceae
- Subfamily: Caesalpinioideae
- Clade: Mimosoid clade
- Genus: Acacia
- Species: A. baueri

Binomial name
- Acacia baueri Benth.
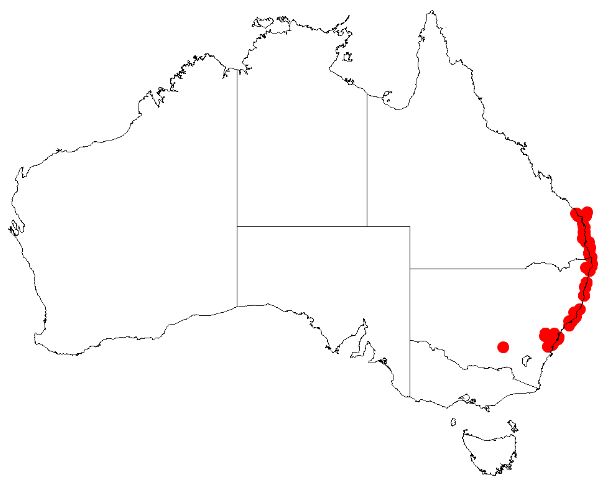
- Occurrence data from AVH

Synonyms
- Racosperma baueri (Benth.) Pedley

= Acacia baueri =

Tiny wattle

Species of legume

Acacia baueri, commonly known as tiny wattle, is a species of flowering plant in the family Fabaceae and is endemic to eastern Australia. It is a low-lying to spreading subshrub with usually whorled or scattered phyllodes, bright yellow flowers arranged in spherical head in axils, and thinly leathery pods.

== Description ==
Acacia baueri is a low-lying to spreading subshrub that forms rhizomes and typically grows to a height of 50 cm (20 in). Its phyllodes are whorled or scattered, straight or slightly curved, circular in cross section, 5–16 mm (0.20–0.63 in) long and about 1 mm (0.039 in) wide. The phyllodes are leathery and glabrous or with a few hairs and more or less glaucous. Each head is 3–5 mm (0.12–0.20 in) in diameter with 8 to 20 bright yellow flowers. Flowering usually occurs from September to June, and the pods are flat, slightly curved, thinly leathery, 10–27 mm (0.39–1.06 in) long and 2.5–4 mm (0.098–0.157 in) wide, sometimes slightly constricted between the seeds. The pods contain up to 3 oblong to shortly cylindrical seeds 4.0–5.5 mm (0.16–0.22 in) long with a convoluted aril.

== Taxonomy ==
Acacia baueri was first formally described in 1842 by George Bentham in the London Journal of Botany from specimens collected by "Bauer". The specific epithet (baueri) honours the botanical artist Ferdinand Bauer who was appointed as a botanical draughtsman to Matthew Flinders 1801 Exploration of the Australian coastline expedition.

In 1972, Leslie Pedley described two subspecies of A. baueri in Contributions from the Queensland Herbarium, and the names are accepted by the Australian Plant Census:

- Acacia baueri subsp. aspera (Maiden & Betche) Pedley, formerly known as Acacia baueri var. aspera Maiden & Betche has flowers in heads of 8 to 10, peduncles 6–15 mm (0.24–0.59 in) long, sepals 0.8–1.1 mm (0.031–0.043 in) long with lobes 0.3–0.5 mm (0.012–0.020 in) long and petals 1.2–1.6 mm (0.047–0.063 in) long.
- Acacia baueri Benth. subsp. baueri, has flowers in heads of 10 to 20, peduncles 2–4 mm (0.079–0.157 in) long, sepals 0.7–0.9 mm (0.028–0.035 in) long with lobes 0.25–0.35 mm (0.0098–0.0138 in) long and petals 1.0–1.2 mm (0.039–0.047 in) long.

== Distribution and habitat ==
Acacia baueri occurs from Fraser Island in Queensland and south to Sydney in New South Wales. Subspecies aspera is restricted to the Blue Mountains, Royal National Park and Wilton in New South Wales, where it grows in exposed, rocky places in low heath. Subspecies baueri grows in coastal heath in often waterlogged soil from Fraser Island to Botany Bay in New South Wales.

== Conservation status ==
Acacia baueri subsp. aspera is listed as "endangered" under the Australian Government Environment Protection and Biodiversity Conservation Act 1999 and as "vulnerable" under the New South Wales Government Biodiversity Conservation Act 2016.

Acacia baueri subsp. baueri is listed as "vulnerable" under the Queensland Government Nature Conservation Act 1992.

== See also ==
- List of Acacia species
