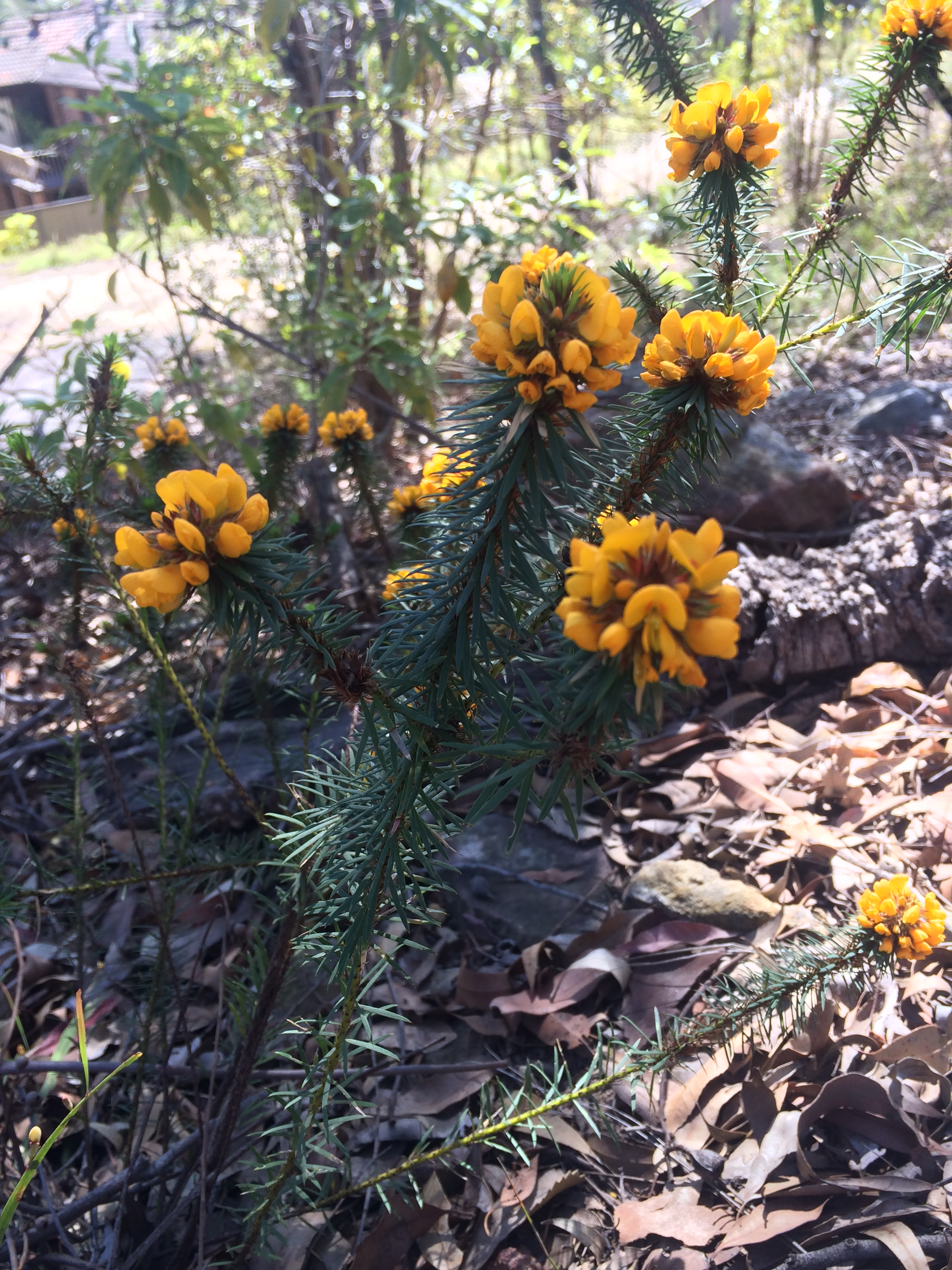
- In Illawong

Conservation status
- Vulnerable (EPBC Act)

Scientific classification
- Kingdom: Plantae
- Clade: Embryophytes
- Clade: Tracheophytes
- Clade: Spermatophytes
- Clade: Angiosperms
- Clade: Eudicots
- Clade: Rosids
- Order: Fabales
- Family: Fabaceae
- Subfamily: Faboideae
- Genus: Pultenaea
- Species: P. aristata

Binomial name
- Pultenaea aristata Sieber ex DC.

= Pultenaea aristata =

Bearded bush-pea

Species of flowering plant

Pultenaea aristata, commonly known as bearded bush-pea or prickly bush-pea, is a species of flowering plant in the family Fabaceae and is endemic to New South Wales. It is a small, erect shrub with linear to narrow elliptic, sharp-tipped leaves, and yellow and red flowers.

== Description ==
Pultenaea aristata is an erect shrub that typically grows to a height of 0.4–1.0 m (1 ft 4 in – 3 ft 3 in). The leaves are linear to narrow elliptic, 8–22 mm (0.31–0.87 in) long and 1–2 mm (0.039–0.079 in) wide tapering to a sharp point, and with stipules 5–6 mm (0.20–0.24 in) long at the base. The upper and lower surfaces are a similar shade of green, and are covered with small pimples. The flowers are densely crowded at the ends of the branchlets with overlapping bracts at the base. Each flower is about 12 mm (0.47 in) long on a pedicel 1–2 mm (0.039–0.079 in) long with linear to egg-shaped bracteoles 7–8 mm (0.28–0.31 in) long, and with a hairy awn at the tip. The sepals are about 9 mm (0.35 in) long with sharp point. The standard petal is yellow to orange with reddish markings and 10–13 mm (0.39–0.51 in) long, the wings are yellow and the keel is red. Flowering occurs between September and October and the fruit is an oval pod.

== Taxonomy and naming ==
Pultenaea aristata was first formally described in 1825 by Augustin Pyramus de Candolle in his Prodromus Systematis Naturalis Regni Vegetabilis from an unpublished description by Franz Sieber. The specific epithet (aristata) means "awned".

== Distribution and habitat ==
Bearded bush-pea grows in woodland and heath on sandstone, from the southern suburbs of Sydney to Mount Keira near Wollongong.

== Conservation status ==
This pultenaea is classified as "vulnerable" under the Australian Government Environment Protection and Biodiversity Conservation Act 1999 and the New South Wales Government Biodiversity Conservation Act 2016. The main threats to the species include inappropriate fire regimes, understorey clearing and road widening and maintenance.
