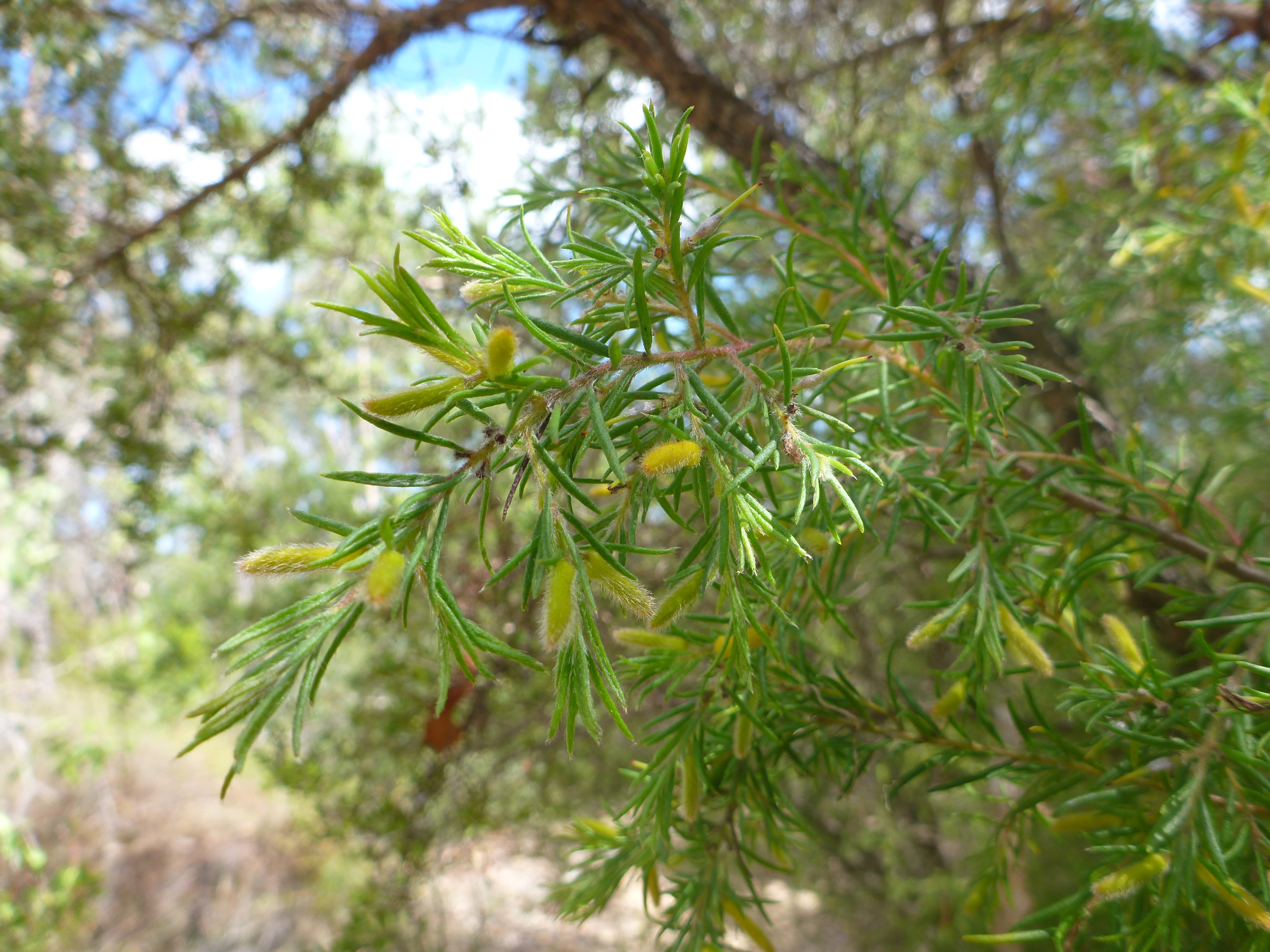
- In Yengo National Park

Conservation status
- Endangered (IUCN 3.1)

- Endangered (EPBC Act)

Scientific classification
- Kingdom: Plantae
- Clade: Tracheophytes
- Clade: Angiosperms
- Clade: Eudicots
- Order: Proteales
- Family: Proteaceae
- Genus: Persoonia
- Species: P. hirsuta

Binomial name
- Persoonia hirsuta Pers.
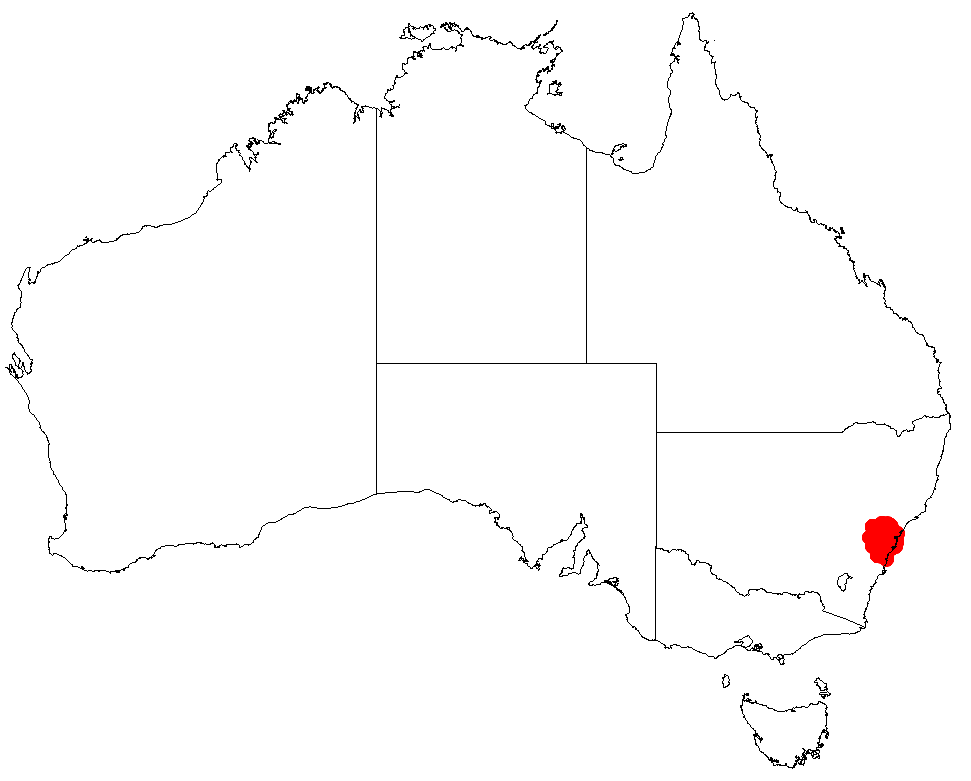
- Occurrence data from Australasian Virtual Herbarium

Synonyms
- List: Linkia hirsuta (Pers.) Kuntze; Persoonia arida Sieber ex Schult. nom. illeg., nom. superfl.; Persoonia arida Sieber ex Spreng.; Persoonia aspera Benth. nom. inval., pro syn.; ? Persoonia hirsuta var. linearis Endl. nom. inval., nom. nud.; Persoonia hirsuta var. linearis Meisn.; ? Persoonia hirsuta var. spathulata Meisn.; Persoonia hirsuta var. subovalis Endl. nom. inval., nom. nud.; Persoonia hirsuta var. subovalis Meisn.

= Persoonia hirsuta =

Hairy geebung

Species of flowering plant

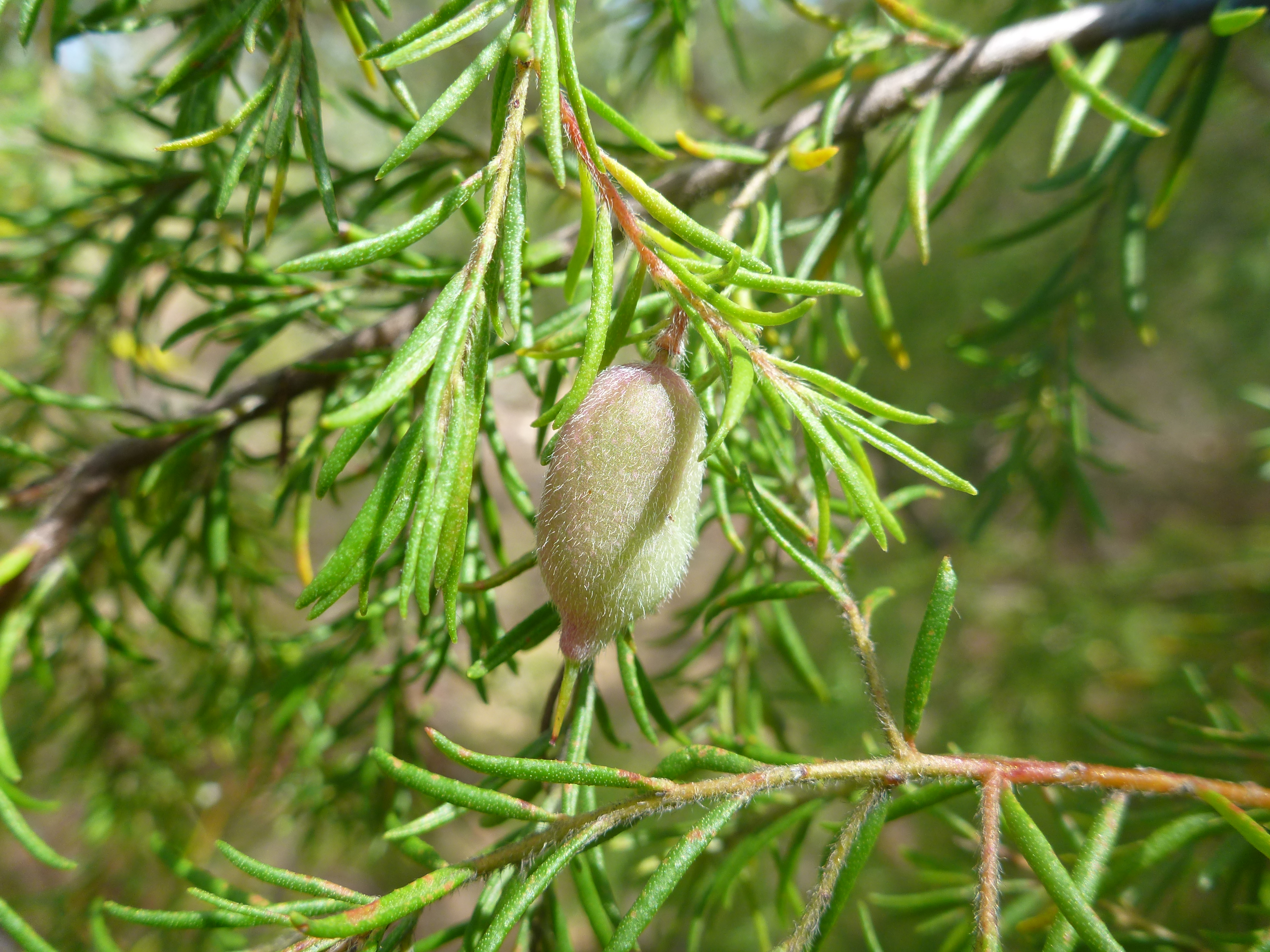
Drupe

Persoonia hirsuta, commonly known as the hairy geebung or hairy persoonia, is a species of flowering plant in the family Proteaceae. It is endemic to eastern New South Wales, Australia. It is a hairy, spreading to low-lying shrub with linear, lance-shaped or spatula-shaped leaves and yellow or orange flowers arranged singly or in groups of up to ten on a rachis up to 20 mm (0.79 in) long.

== Description ==
Persoonia hirsuta is a spreading to low-lying shrub that typically grows to a height of 0.3–1.5 mm (0.012–0.059 in) and has hairy branchlets leaves, flowers and fruit. The leaves are spatula-shaped to elliptic or linear to narrow oblong leaves, 5–14 mm (0.20–0.55 in) long and 0.7–5 mm (0.028–0.197 in) wide with the edges curved downwards or rolled under. The flowers are borne singly or in groups of up to ten on a rachis up to 20 mm (0.79 in) long that continues to grow into a leafy shoot after flowering. The tepals are yellow or orange, about 10 mm (0.39 in) long. Flowering mostly occurs from November to January and the fruit is a fleshy green to cream-coloured drupe with red streaks.

== Taxonomy and naming ==
Collected by John White in the vicinity of Port Jackson (Sydney) in 1794, Persoonia hirsuta was first formally described by Christiaan Hendrik Persoon in his 1805 work Synopsis Plantarum.

In 1991, Peter Weston and Lawrie Johnson described two subspecies and the names are accepted by the Australian Plant Census:

- Persoonia hirsuta subsp. evoluta L.A.S.Johnson & P.H.Weston has spatula-shaped to elliptic leaves 1.5–5 mm (0.059–0.197 in) wide with the edges turned down;
- Persoonia hirsuta Pers. subsp. hirsuta has linear to narrow oblong leaves 0.75–1.5 mm (0.030–0.059 in) wide with the edges rolled under.

== Distribution and habitat ==
Hairy geebung usually grows in open woodland and heath on sandstone soils. Subspecies evoluta is sporadically distributed on the Central Coast and Central Tablelands in the Putty, Glen Davis and Hill Top districts, mainly at altitudes between 350 and 600 m (1,150 and 1,970 ft). Subspecies hirsuta is found from Gosford to the Royal National Park, mainly within 20 km (12 mi) of the coast and at altitudes lower than 300 m (980 ft).

== Ecology ==
The two subspecies intergrade with each other from the lower Blue Mountains to within 15 km (9.3 mi) of the coast. Subspecies evoluta also hybridises with P. mollis subsp. nectens. The fruit are adapted to be eaten by vertebrates, such as kangaroos, possums, and currawongs and other large birds.

== Conservation status ==
Persoonia hirsuta is listed as endangered on the IUCN Red List of Threatened Species as well as nationally under the Environment Protection and Biodiversity Conservation Act 1999 and in New South Wales under the Biodiversity Conservation Act 2016. The species occurs in fragmented small populations throughout its range and is threatened by urban development, clearing or degradation of bushland and too frequent bushfires and burning of bush. The European honeybee has been implicated in the decline of this and other species as it is suspected of being a poor pollinator of persoonia flowers.

Auld, T.D.; Douglas, S.; Weston, P. (2020). "Persoonia hirsuta". IUCN Red List of Threatened Species. 2020 e.T118153583A129453447. doi:10.2305/IUCN.UK.2020-3.RLTS.T118153583A129453447.en.
