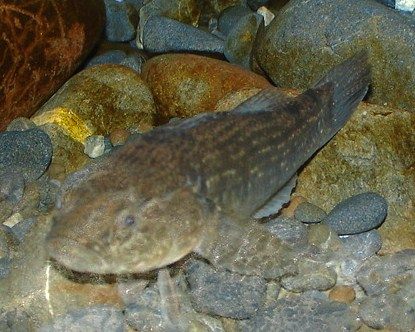

Conservation status
- Least Concern (IUCN 3.1)

- Naturally Uncommon (NZ TCS)

Scientific classification
- Kingdom: Animalia
- Phylum: Chordata
- Class: Actinopterygii
- Division: Teleostei
- Order: Gobiiformes
- Family: Eleotridae
- Genus: Gobiomorphus
- Species: G. gobioides

Binomial name
- Gobiomorphus gobioides (Valenciennes, 1837)
- Approximate known distribution (in orange) of the giant bully on a map of New Zealand

Synonyms
- Eleotris gobioides Valenciennes, 1837

= Giant bully =

Species of fish

The giant bully (Gobiomorphus gobioides), tītarakura, or tīpokopoko (Māori), is a species of probably amphidromous ray-finned fish belonging to the family Eleotridae, the spinycheek sleepers or bullies. This fish is endemic to New Zealand.

== Taxonomy ==
The giant bully was first formally described as Eleotris gobioides in 1837 by the French zoologist Achille Valenciennes in volume 12 of Histoire naturelle des poissons with its type locality given as the Bay of Islands, New Zealand. In 1863 the American naturalist Theodore Gill described the genus Gobiomorphus with Eleotris gobioides designated as its type species, as well as being the type species by monotypy. The genus Gobiomorphus is classified in the family Eleotridae, which is classified within the suborder Gobioidei, the gobies, of the order Gobiiformes, which also includes the cardinalfishes and sand divers.

== Etymology ==
The giant bully is the type species of the genus Gobiomorphus, this name being a combination of gobio, a small fish of little value, a gudgeon or goby, with morphius, meaning "having the shape of". This repeats the meaning of the specific name of this species, goboides. Valenciennes wrote that this species resembles the gobies of Europe.

== Description ==
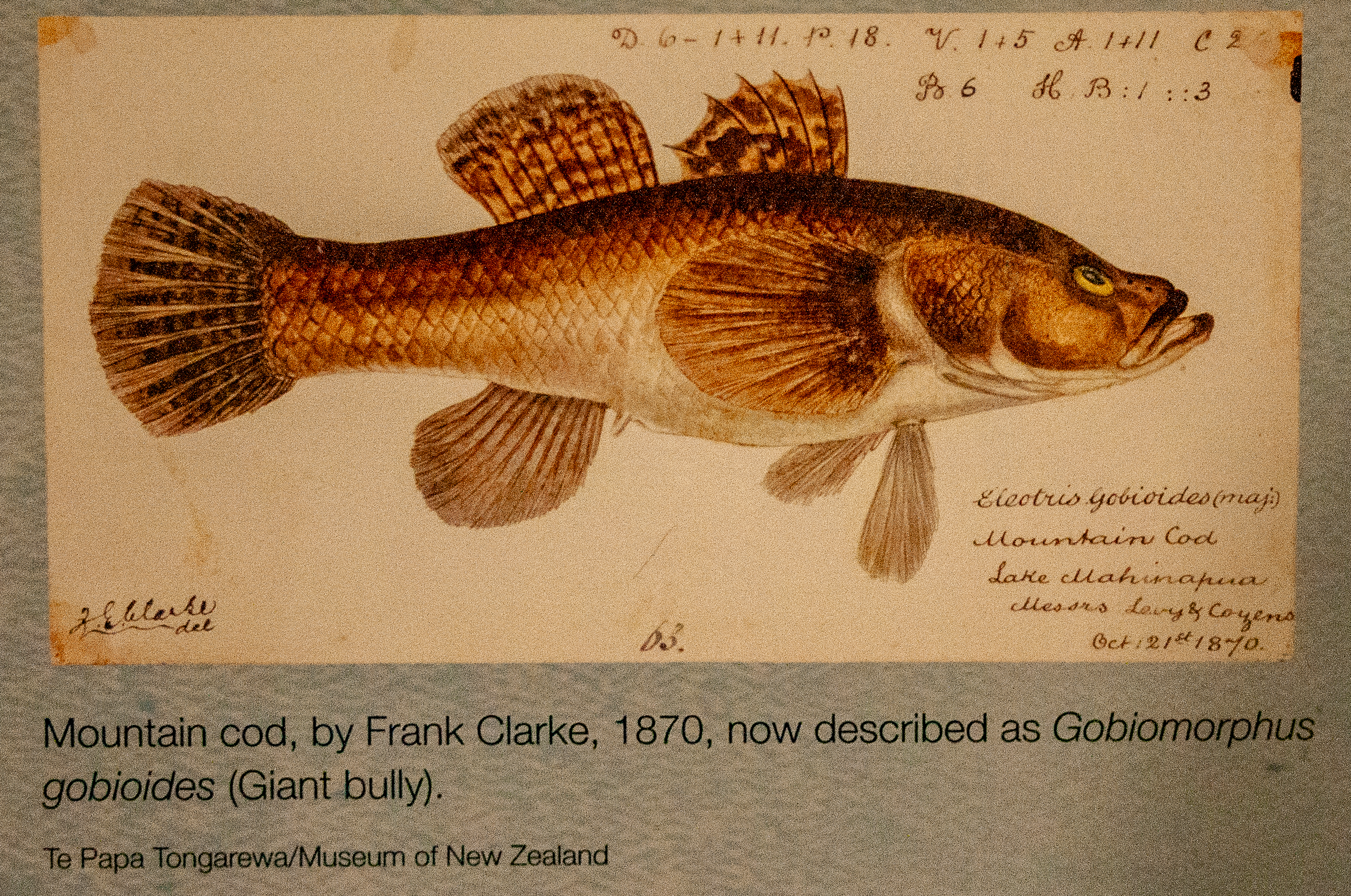
Giant bully by Frank E. Clarke, 1870

This is the largest species of bully and it can reach more than 25 cm (10 in) in length, but most are 12–15 cm (4.7–5.9 in). Adults are generally found near the coast in freshwater, tidal or estuarine habitats. The breeding behavior is poorly known, but the species is considered diadromous and it is suspected that the larvae spend time in the sea.

It is very similar to the common bully (which can reach up to 15 cm or 5.9 in), but it has six dorsal spines, where the common bully usually has seven.

== Distribution and habitat ==
The species is endemic to New Zealand, where it is widespread throughout the country in the coastal lower ends of rivers and estuarine habitats.

== Conservation status ==
Under the New Zealand Threat Classification System, this species is listed as "Naturally Uncommon" with the qualifiers of "Data Poor" and "Range Restricted".
