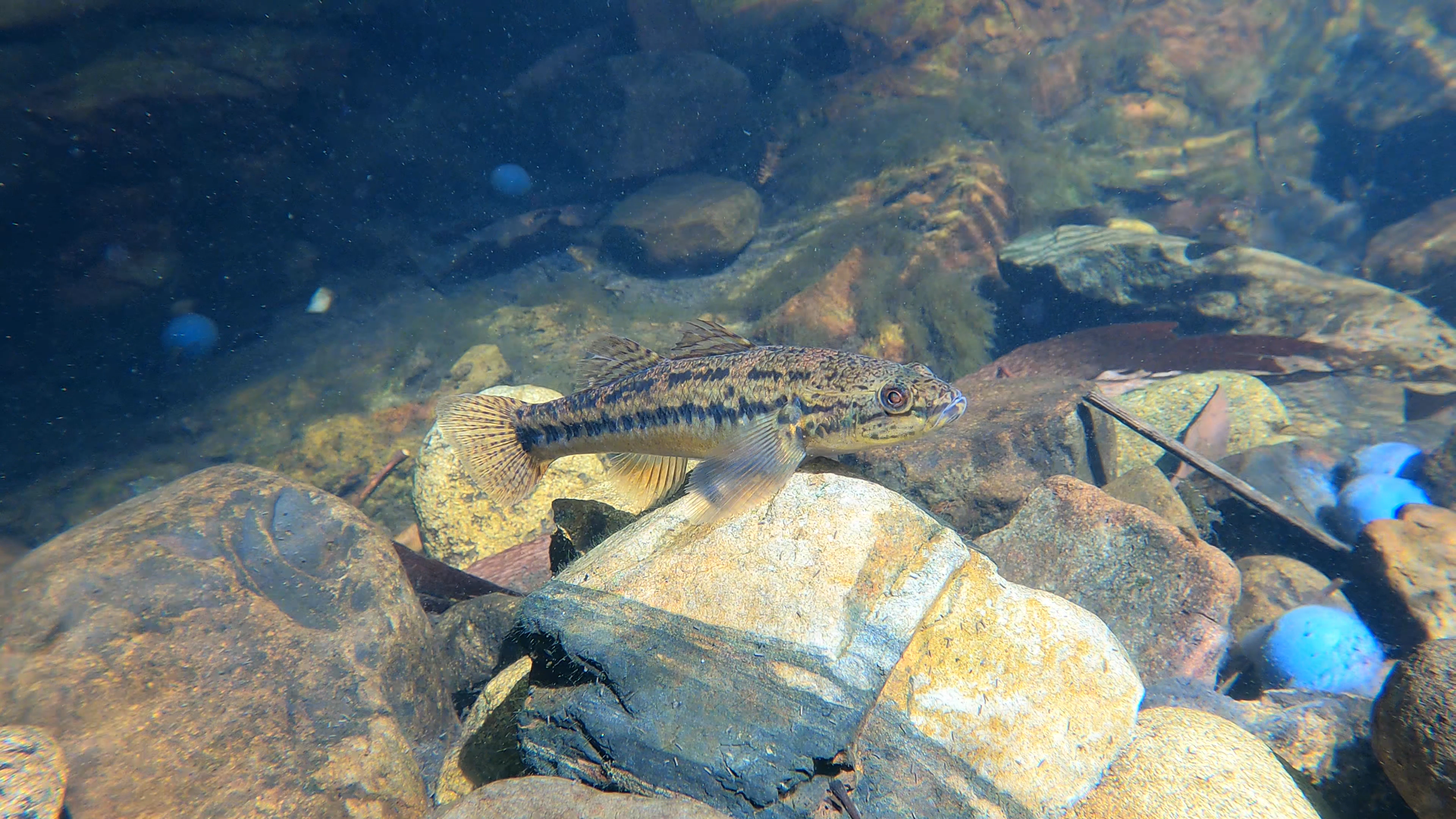

Conservation status
- Least Concern (IUCN 3.1)

Scientific classification
- Kingdom: Animalia
- Phylum: Chordata
- Class: Actinopterygii
- Order: Gobiiformes
- Family: Eleotridae
- Genus: Gobiomorphus
- Species: G. coxii

Binomial name
- Gobiomorphus coxii Krefft, 1864

Synonyms
- Eleotris coxii Krefft, 1864

= Gobiomorphus coxii =

Species of fish

Gobiomorphus coxii, or Cox's gudgeon, is a species of sleeper goby in the family Eleotridae which is native to the upland rivers of south eastern Australia.

== Description ==
Gobiomorphus coxii is dark brown to greenish-brown in colour on the back and flanks, this colouration fades to pale brown or cream on the underside. The scales on the lower flanks are mottled with blue, gold and yellow and there is a single black spot above the base of the pectoral fin. The juveniles have series of elongated blotches on their flanks which merge as they nature to create a wide, dusky, mid-lateral stripe. The head is dark brown with the lower jaw and throat often coloured black and with two indistinct, dark stripes radiating from the rear of the orbit across operculum. Its fins vary from colourless to blackish-grey and the dorsal fins have between one and three dark stripes with a yellow or orange background colour. The margins of the fin are frequently fin margins yellow and the caudal fin is marked with many dark spots which are arranged in irregular bands.

The body of Gobiomorphus coxii is nearly cylindrical and tapers towards the tail, the head is large with a blunt, round snout and the quite small eyes are positioned high on the head. The mouth is relatively large, oblique and turned upwards with the lips ending lust below the front part of the eyes. They have jaws armed with bands of fine, pointed teeth. The cheek and operculum have lines of papillae which are also found around the preopercular margin and on each side of snout to above the eye. There are 3-5 large pores on the preopercular margin. It has two dorsal fins, the first, anterior dorsal fin, is rounded and has notches between its six spines and the second, posterior dorsal fin, is taller and slightly longer. The anal fin is below the second dorsal fin but it is smaller and rounder. The caudal fin is quite large and is, truncated while the pectoral fins are also large and are rounded and the rather long, pointed pelvic fins are located on the thorax. Males grow to a maximum standard length of 19 centimetres (7.5 in) but are more commonly 15 centimetres (5.9 in), but the females grow larger than the males.

== Distribution and habitat ==
Gobiomorphis coxii is endemic to eastern Australia from southern Queensland to Gippsland. It also occurs in the Swan River in Western Australia where it is thought to be an Introduced species. This species occurs in coastal and inland freshwaters up to around 700 metres (2,300 ft) in altitude where it is normally found in upland streams with reasonable fats currents, even in rapids.

== Biology ==
The populations of Gobiomorphus coxii appear to be more abundant in the more southerly rivers in its range, it is especially numerous in flowing areas, even rapids.. The adults do not occur in the lower reaches and they range upstream up to 700 metres (2,300 ft) and they are rare near the sea. They have been recorded ascending dam walls and waterfalls using their pectorals even outside of the water flow. The adults feed on aquatic insects and on mosquitofish. The juveniles are generally found in the lower reaches of rivers, closer to their mouths and migrate up stream as they mature. Females lay eggs onto rocky surfaces which are the guarded and fanned by the male for several days until they hatch into free-swimming larvae which are carried downstream.
