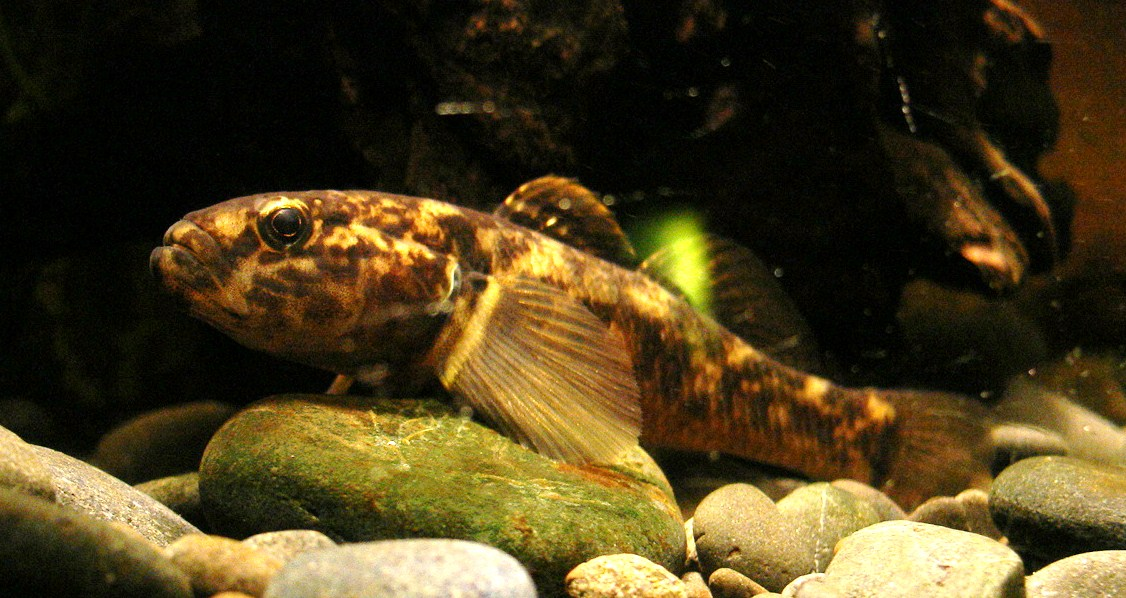

Conservation status
- Least Concern (IUCN 3.1)

Scientific classification
- Kingdom: Animalia
- Phylum: Chordata
- Class: Actinopterygii
- Order: Gobiiformes
- Family: Eleotridae
- Genus: Gobiomorphus
- Species: G. cotidianus

Binomial name
- Gobiomorphus cotidianus McDowall, 1975
- Approximate known distribution (in orange) of the common bully on a map of New Zealand

= Common bully =

Species of fish

The common bully (Gobiomorphus cotidianus), or toitoi (Māori), is a fish endemic to New Zealand, and is present throughout the country. There are three other bully species that can be confused with common bullies. There are few characteristics of the common bully that separate it from other species. Vertical lines present on the cheek are a good defining characteristic, along with the location of head pores and scale patterns on the head although these are hard to establish when seen in the wild. It is an amphidromous fish meaning it is able to survive in marine and fresh water environments. It is a small fish only growing as big as 15 cm. It can live in marine, fresh water or brackish water habitats and generally lives in benthic zones. Some populations venture into the sea and occur in coastal rivers and streams while other land-locked populations have established in many shallow mainland lakes. They generally prefer moderate to slow moving water which means they are the most likely bully species to be sighted. Its diet consists mainly of small benthic invertebrates but also involves insect larvae and crustacea.

== Natural history ==
Apart from a few sightings in Stewart Island and Great Barrier Island, the common bully is normally found in mainland areas. These populations have established in land-locked areas due to natural processes. It is thought that these populations of fish inhabited lakes or relatively high in river systems which were eventually blocked off from the sea due to natural processes. In these land-locked environments the common bully is an important prey for larger freshwater fish such as eels and trout.

== Reproduction ==
In the summer months Gobiomorphus cotidianus can be found moving more into the littoral zones of lakes and streams as the females prepare to reproduce. The females attach clusters of a several hundred to a few thousand eggs onto the underside of hard surfaces on the lake bottom where they are fertilized and guarded by the males. The larval stage of bullies are planktonic and their main source of food are zooplankton. As the young grow larger they move into deeper waters, and become benthic once they reach about 18mm in length. They mature at around 1 year old and the average generation gap is 2 years.

== Translocations ==
On the 12th May 2023, Zealandia Te Māra a Tāne began what is believed to be the first translocation of this species into Zealandia. New Zealand's freshwater mussels use the gills of this fish species to transport their larvae to new locations away from their parents. By translocating toitoi into Zealandia, they hope to help restore the fresh water ecosystem of both Zealandia and its connected waterways.
