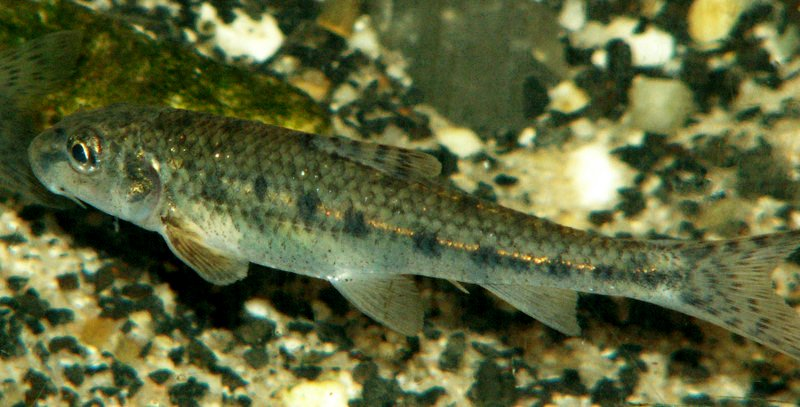

Conservation status
- Least Concern (IUCN 3.1)

Scientific classification
- Kingdom: Animalia
- Phylum: Chordata
- Class: Actinopterygii
- Division: Teleostei
- Order: Cypriniformes
- Suborder: Cyprinoidei
- Family: Gobionidae
- Genus: Gobio
- Species: G. gobio

Binomial name
- Gobio gobio (Linnaeus, 1758)

Synonyms
- Cyprinus gobio Linnaeus, 1758; Cobitis fundulus Wulff, 1765; Gobio fluviatilis Fleming, 1828; Gobio vernatus Bonaparte, 1839; Gobio saxatalis Koch, 1840; Gobio gobio utescens De Filippi, 1844; Gobio fluviatilis Cuvier, 1842; Gobio vulgaris Gistel, 1848; Gobio gobio muresia Jászfalusi, 1951; Gobio gobio nikolskyi Turdakov, & Piskarev, 1955; Gobio gobio albanicus Oliva, 1961; Gobio gobio chipingi Bănărescu & Nalbant, 1964

= Gobio gobio =

Species of fish

Gobio gobio, or the gudgeon or common gudgeon, is a species of fish in the family Gobionidae. This small fish is widely distributed in freshwater streams and lakes across central and temperate Eurasia.

The gudgeon inhabits various freshwater habitats with sandy bottoms. It is a gregarious species, and feeds on benthic invertebrates. Its lifespan is up to five years. Gudgeons are usually smaller than 12 cm, rarely over 15 cm long. The common name gudgeon may also refer to other species of fish.

== Description ==
The gudgeon has a long, slender, rounded body and is typically 9–13 cm (3.5–5.1 in) long, but can reach up to 21 cm (8.3 in). It has short dorsal and anal fins that do not have serrated rays. There is a labial barbel at each corner of its mouth. It has two rows of pharyngeal teeth, conical, and slightly curved at the tip. Its head is wide and flattened, with a rather obtuse snout, the lower jaw being shorter than the upper one. It has relatively large scales and there are 40 to 45 of these along the lateral line. Its swimming bladder is large. Usually greenish brown above and silvery on the sides, this fish has a row of six to twelve faint dark blotches running along the flank. It has a white underside, and its pectoral, ventral, and anal fins are of a grayish-white color with a brownish tinge. The dorsal and caudal fins are pale brown with darker spots.

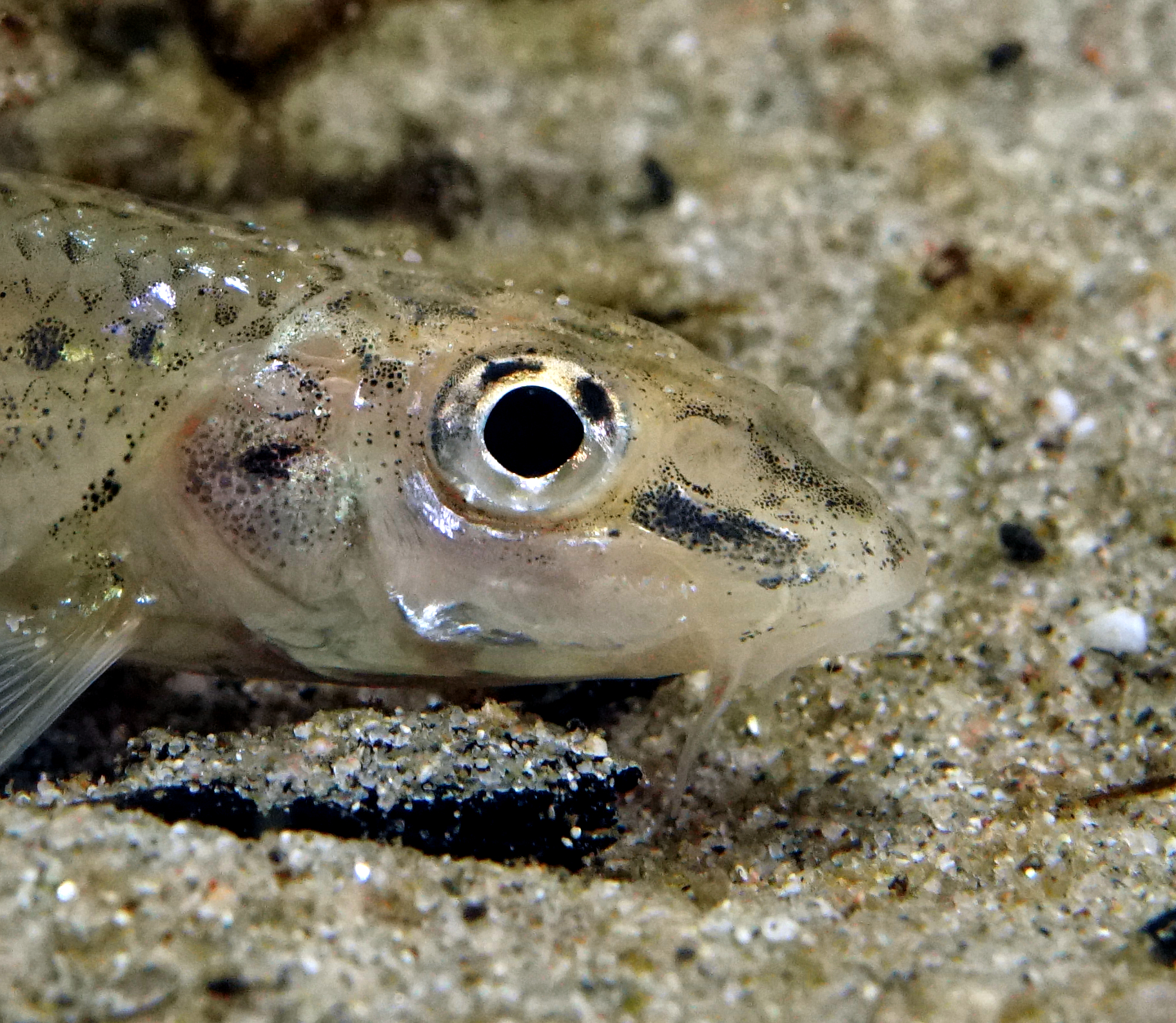
The gudgeon has a pair of barbels.

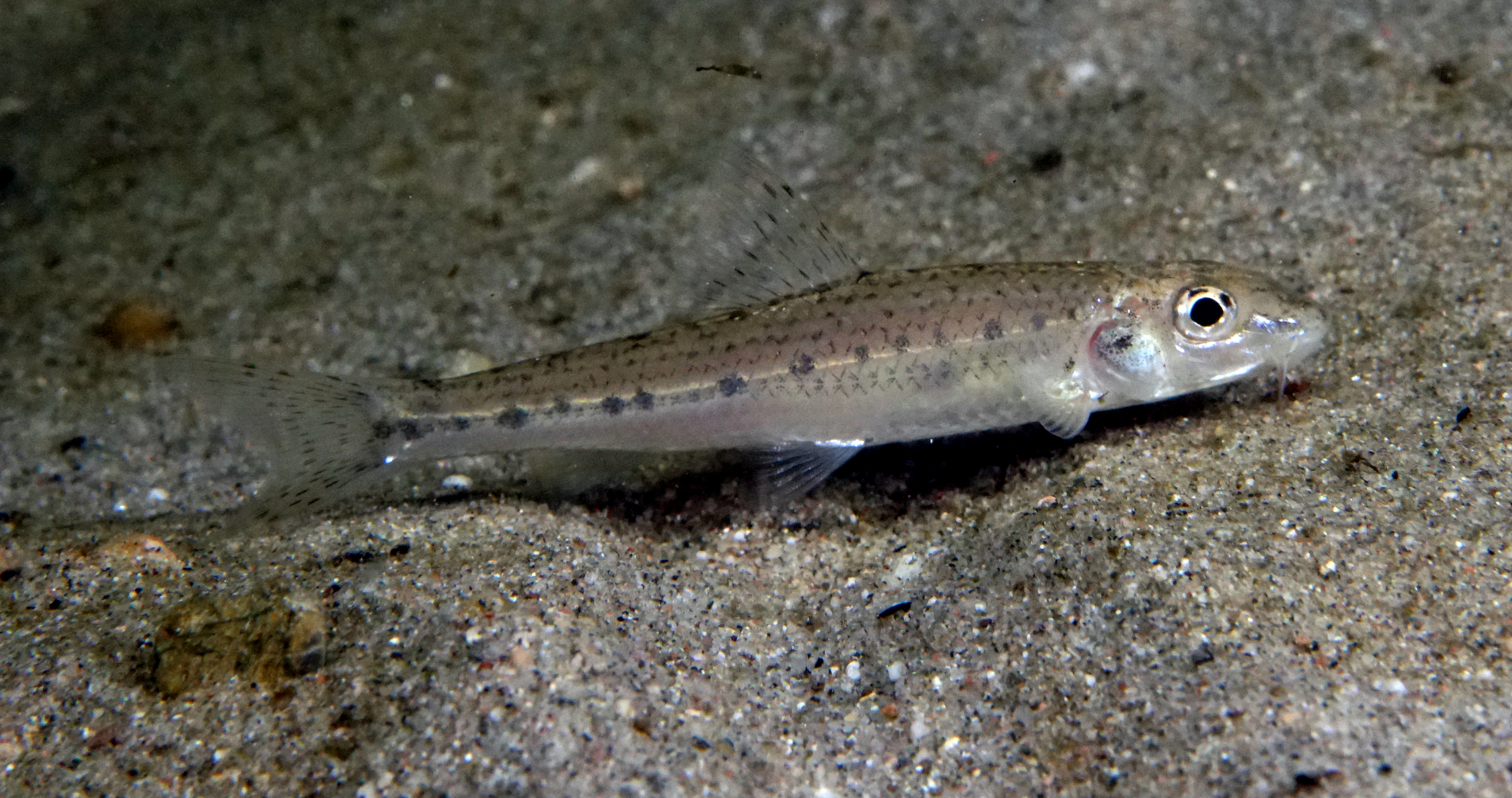
Gudgeon in a gravel pit lake

== Distribution and habitat ==
The gudgeon is present in freshwater systems that drain into the eastern Atlantic Ocean, the North Sea and Baltic Sea basins. These drainages include the Loire drainage and the drainages further east, the eastern Great Britain and Rhône drainages, the upper Danube and middle and upper Dniestr, and the Bug and Dniepr drainages in the Black Sea basin. It is unclear how far into Asia its range extends. It is typically found in lakes, rivers and streams of all sizes that have sandy or gravelly bottoms.

== Behavior ==
The gudgeon moves in shoals over sandy and gravelly bottoms, feeding on worms, aquatic insects and larvae, small mollusks, ova, and fry. It is normally active during the day. It is capable of emitting squeaking sounds, which are believed to be a means of communication between individuals. It breeds in shallow waters over stones. Eggs are laid from April to August, when water temperatures are above 13 °C. The eggs are released above the substrate and drift with the current before adhering to the bottom. The larvae and juveniles feed on detritus on the bottom. The fingerlings grow to some 12 cm (4.7 in) in the first year. This fish can live for up to five years. The species is much valued for its delicate flavour.

== Predators ==
The gudgeon is a common prey of many fish-eating predators like the Eurasian otter or common kingfisher. In Central Europe, in streams and rivers, the gudgeon composes up to 45% of the diet of the common kingfisher (by numbers, usually between 25 and 35%), and represents the most hunted fish prey. One study showed that gudgeon composed over 80% of the diet of otter by numbers, and over 50% of their diet by weight (Chotýšanka stream, Central Bohemia, Czech Republic).

== Status ==
The gudgeon has a wide range and is abundant in many localities. It faces no particular identified threats, so the IUCN has listed it as being of "Least Concern".
