= Manuherikia Group =

Geologic formation in New Zealand

- Stratigraphic range: Early-Middle Miocene
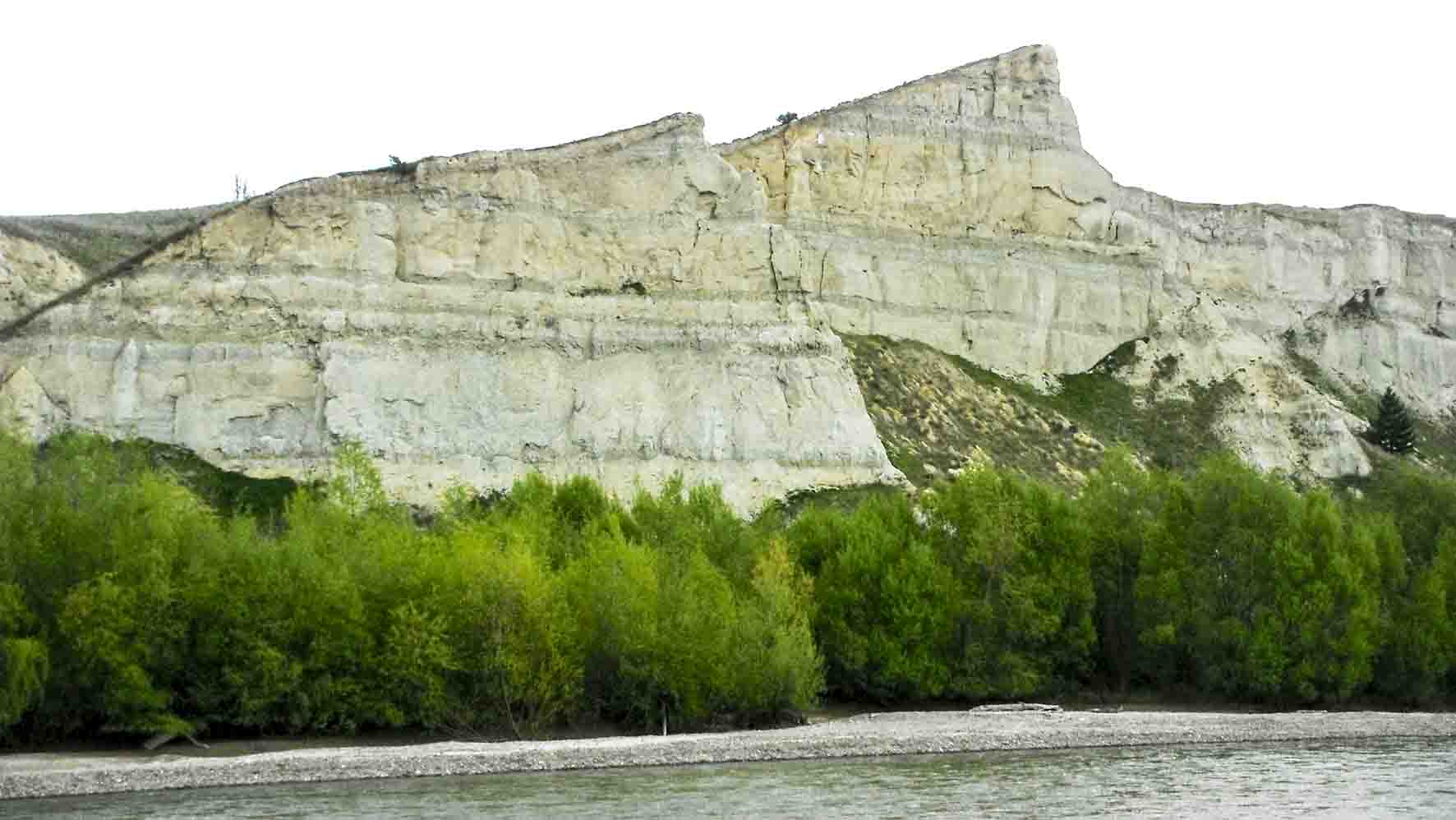
- Bannockburn Formation at Galloway
- Type: Group
- Sub-units: Dunstan & Bannockburn Formations

Lithology
- Primary: Sandstone, shale
- Other: Coal

Location
- Location: South Island
- Coordinates: 44.9°S 169.8°E
- Approximate paleocoordinates: 49.7°S 179.6°W
- Region: Central Otago
- Country: New Zealand
- Extent: >5,600 km^{2} (2,200 sq mi)

Type section
- Named for: Lake Manuherikia
- Manuherikia Group (New Zealand)

The Manuherikia Group is a fluvial-lacustrine sedimentary fill in the Central Otago area of New Zealand, at the site of the prehistoric Lake Manuherikia. The area consists of a valley and ridge topography, with a series of schist-greywacke mountains at roughly ninety degrees to each other. The Manuherika Group occurs in the current basins, and occasionally on the mountains themselves.

== History ==
One of the earliest geologists to work in the area, McKay, understood that the Manuherikia Group was probably originally continuous. Although some workers came to believe the sediments were deposited in a series of small, interconnected basins between the mountain ranges, e.g. Park, later workers, like Cotton argued that the sediments had been isolated by later mountain growth. Douglas placed the Manuherikia Group sediments into a coherent genetic context. He drew attention to Manuherikia Group sediments on the top of mountain ranges, and to the observation that sequences in distinct basins were similar. His conclusion was that the Manuherikia Group is the result of sedimentation in a single (except for the earliest stages) very large basin that was later intruded by the growth of the mountain ranges. This basin ultimately grew into a single huge lake – Lake Manuherikia – that extended over some 5,600 km^{2} (2,200 sq mi).

Palynological work by Couper, Mildenhall, Mildenhall and Pocknall has indicated that the Manuherikia Group is basically Miocene in age. The plant macrofossils, common in the lower Manuherikia Group, are mostly Early Miocene, perhaps with some in the earliest Middle Miocene.

== Stratigraphy ==
Following Douglas, the primary subdivision of the Manuherikia Group is into a lower, fluvial (commonly with coal) Dunstan Formation and an upper, lacustrine Bannockburn Formation. The oldest unit of the Manuherikia Group is the Saint Bathans Member of the Dunstan Formation, consisting of the braided-river fill of valleys incised into the basement rocks. Traces of three St Bathans paleovalleys are known – one at Blue Lake, adjacent to St Bathans, is the best exposed. The St Bathans paleovalleys eventually filled, sedimentation spread out over a broader area, and the fluvial character became dominantly meandering. This material is grouped as the Fiddlers Member. Extensive coal swamps developed between the rivers and their flood basins.

Individual flood basin lakes began to coalesce into a true lacustrine system – Lake Manuherikia. Its muddy and sandy sediments are grouped as the Bannockburn Formation. Around the lake margins, distinctive shoreline facies developed. The most widespread of these is the Kawarau Member which contains diverse plant fossils. Distinctive facies within the Kawarau Member have been termed the Cromwell Submember and the Ewing Submember. The Ewing is typically intercalated with the Lauder Member, an informal unit of the Bannockburn Formation. This contains a fossil fauna (the Saint Bathans Fauna) of birds, fish, and a crocodilian, New Zealand's first known terrestrial mammal, as well as bats. Stromatolites are also present.

At two locations around the depocenter, river deltas developed and large thicknesses of coal built up on upper delta plains. These are termed the Blackstone Delta and Teviot Delta. Fully lacustrine conditions ensued with the submergence of these deltas and for much of the mid Miocene, Lake Manuherikia was without known bounds. Rising mountains in the Late Miocene-Pliocene eventually deluged Lake Manuherikia with gravel – the Maori Bottom, or Maniototo Conglomerate.

== Fossil content ==
=== Bannockburn Formation ===
- Aegotheles zealandivetus
- Deliaphaps
- Dunstanetta
- Hakawai
- Heracles
- Manuherikia douglasi, M. lacustrina, M. minuta, M. primadividua
- Matanas
- Matuku
- Miotadorna sanctibathansi, M. catrionae
- Neilus
- Nelepsittacus donmertoni, N. daphneleeae, N. minimus
- Notochen
- Palaelodus aotearoa
- Pelecanoides miokuaka
- Pikaihao
- Proapteryx
- Rupephaps
- Zealandornis
- Leiopelma indet.
- Galaxias angustiventris, G. brevicauda, G. bobmcdowalli, G. papilionis, G. parvirostris, G. tabidus
- Mataichthys
- Prototroctes modestus, P. vertex

==== St Bathans Member ====
An extremely diverse macroflora flora, based on well-preserved cuticle. There are two cycad-like taxa:

- Pterostoma douglasii
- Greylackia

The conifers total 16 species in 12 genera, including:

- Acmopyle
- Araucariaceae (Araucaria and ?Agathis)
- Dacrycarpus
- Dacrydium
- Kakahuia
- Lepidothamnus
- Papuacedrus
- Podocarpus
- Prumnopitys
- Retrophyllum
- Taxaceae

Other gymnosperms:

- Gnetalaceae

Monocots include:

- Astelia
- Typha

The dicots include:

- Winteraceae
- Atherospermataceae
- Monimiceae (Hedycarya sp.)
- Proteaceae
- Menispermaceae
- Santalaceae (Amphorogyne, Notothixos)
- Casuarinaceae (Gymnostoma)
- Paracryphiaceae (Paracryphia)
- Elaeocarpaceae-Cunoniaceae
- Meliaceae
- Nothofagaceae (Nothofagus)
- Myrtaceae (Syzygium, Metrosideros)
- Phellinaceae (Phelline)
- Sapindaceae
- Myrsinaceae
- Grisselinaceae (Grisselinia)
- Argophyllaceae (Argophyllum)
- Lauraceae, at least 22 species including Endiandra and Cryptocarya

== See also ==
- Foulden Maar
- Stratigraphy of New Zealand
