= Galaxias terenasus =

Conservation status
- Endangered (IUCN 3.1)

Scientific classification
- Kingdom: Animalia
- Phylum: Chordata
- Class: Actinopterygii
- Order: Galaxiiformes
- Family: Galaxiidae
- Genus: Galaxias
- Species complex: Mountain galaxias
- Species: G. terenasus

Binomial name
- Galaxias terenasus Raadik, 2014

Species of fish

Galaxias terenasus, the roundsnout galaxias, is a galaxiid of the genus Galaxias, a member of the mountain galaxias species complex group of freshwater fish, found in Australia.

== Description ==
The most distinct member of the mountain galaxias species complex, whilst still sharing the usual Galaxias body form of a long tubular body and rounded fins. G. terenasus differs from other members of the complex by its relatively small size (females larger than males) distinctive colouration and pattern on the body, thin fins and a rounded snout profile when viewed from the side. Eyes set high on the head; centre-line fins somewhat fleshy at the base, paired fins less so. Pelvic fins small and set low with their leading edge roughly at the mid point of the body. Pectoral fins medium sized and paddle shaped. Tail fin moderately notched. Maximum recorded size 70 mm (2.8 in), commonly 45–55 mm (1.8–2.2 in).

Mainly olive brown on the back and sides above the lateral line and over the head and snout, lighter on the lower part of the body and silvery on the belly. Base colour is patterned by small dark and closely packed blotches especially over the back, sides, head and snout. Many of the blotches join together to form uneven vertical bars. These dark markings are occasionally obscured by a fine dark stippling. Gill covers are translucent and have a small gold spot. Fins clear to a translucent tan; iris is a coppery gold.

== Distribution ==
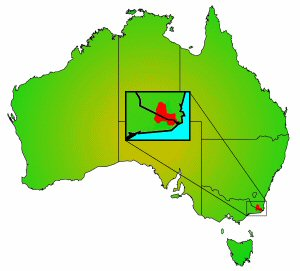
Distribution of Galaxias terenasus

Occurs in Far East Gippsland in Victoria and the extreme southeast of New South Wales in the mid reaches of the Snowy, Cann and Genoa river systems.Little historical data is available, however, specimens were captured from Curry Flat at Nimmitabel in 1914, near Bombala in 1938 and from Church creek near Delegate in 1965-6. The fish's presence in the Bombala and Church Creek catchments was reconfirmed in 2002-3.

== Habitat ==
G. terenasus is generally found in streams ranging from creeks to larger rivers, 1–12 m (3.3–39.4 ft) wides and 10–60 cm (3.9–23.6 in) deep, with slow to medium speed clear water. Pools range in depth from 0.2–1.8 m (0.66–5.91 ft). Surrounding areas are lightly to heavily forested and shaded. Occupied habitat consists mostly of pools, glides and riffles with smaller areas of backed up still water. Stream bed consists mostly of bedrock, boulder, rounded stones and gravel. In stream cover is mostly rock, woody debris and a small amount of macrophytes, leaf litter, undercut stream banks and overhanging vegetation.

== Lifecycle/Reproduction ==
The roundsnout galaxias lives its entire life cycle in freshwater. It has been found in waters also inhabited by a number of native species: longfin and shortfinned eel; River blackfish; common freshwater shrimp; East Gippsland spiny cray; variable spiny crayfish; and, a native bivalve mollusc (Hyridella sp.). In addition it is found in water inhabited by the alien species brown trout, however, it is considered likely that G.terenasus occupies a separate habitat niche to trout.

Spawning season for this fish is unknown but believed to be spring to early summer. Gravid females have been found with 220-240 quite small unshed eggs, 1.2 mm (0.047 in) in diameter on average, indicating a low fecundity for the species.

== Conservation ==
Endangered, protected under the Victorian Flora and Fauna Guarantee Act 1988.

== Utility to humans ==
Not an angling target due to small size and conservation status.
