= Galaxias lanceolatus =

Conservation status
- Critically Endangered (IUCN 3.1)

Scientific classification
- Kingdom: Animalia
- Phylum: Chordata
- Class: Actinopterygii
- Order: Galaxiiformes
- Family: Galaxiidae
- Genus: Galaxias
- Species complex: Mountain galaxias
- Species: G. lanceolatus

Binomial name
- Galaxias lanceolatus Raadik, 2014

Species of fish

Galaxias lanceolatus, the tapered galaxias, is a galaxiid of the genus Galaxias, a member of the mountain galaxias species complex group of freshwater fish, found in Australia.

== Description ==
Length commonly 65–70 millimetres (2.6–2.8 in) maximum recorded 84 millimetres (3.3 in). Body generally tubular, somewhat slender and flattened on the upper surfaces forward of the pelvic fins. Head is moderately sized with a wedge shape viewed from the side and width greater than the depth. Lower jaw shorter than the upper, about 90% of upper jaw length. Body mostly brown or greyish-brown on the back and sides above the lateral line as well as over the top and sides of the head and snout, brown to tan on the lower sides and becoming light brown or cream on the belly. The sides are overlain with brown to almost black blotches or narrow to slightly chevron shaped bars. There is a faint midline band of gold flecks on the sides, the gill covers are translucent with a small golden patch. The iris is coppery and the fins are grey and translucent.

== Distribution ==
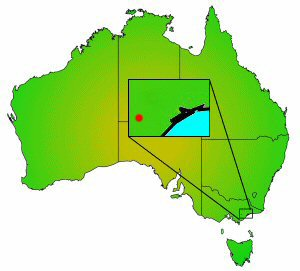
Distribution map of Galaxias lanceolatus

Recorded only from the headwaters of Stoney Creek, within the Thomson River basin of west Gippsland. Specimens have been captured from a limited (10 kilometres (6.2 mi)) reach of the stream at an approximate elevation of 690 metres (2,260 ft). The original distribution downstream is unknown with no records of the species in areas that have been colonised by introduced trout, including adjacent catchments within the overall Thomson River system. Within its range, G. lanceolatus is the only member of the mountain galaxias species complex; the Shaw galaxias (G. gunaikurnai) occurs in a geographically isolated headwater tributary of the Macalister River some 70 kilometres (43 mi) east of Stoney Creek but still within the Thomson River basin. Other native species found in the same catchment include climbing galaxias (G. brevipinnis), short-finned eel (Anguilla australis), central highlands spiny crayfish (Euastacus woiwuru), Gippsland spiny crayfish (Euastacus kershawi) and common freshwater shrimp (Paratya australiensis).

== Habitat ==
Galaxias lanceolatus is found in a small (0.5–1.5 metres (1.6–4.9 ft) wide) and shallow (100–500 millimetres (3.9–19.7 in) deep) cool, clear, slow-flowing creek within a forested area. Stream bottom is mainly cobble with areas of bedrock, gravel and sand. In-stream habitat consists mostly of some undercut banks and rocks with woody debris and stream-side vegetation.

== Lifecycle/Reproduction ==
Purely a freshwater fish, unlike many members of the Galaxias genus which include a downstream migration to the sea within their lifecycle. Breeding season is unknown, but presumed to be late winter to early spring as females collected in May were at a mature stage of ovarian development with some males running ripe.

== Conservation ==
Critically endangered, protected under the Victorian Flora and Fauna Guarantee Act 1988.

== Utility to humans ==
Not an angling target due to small size and conservation status.
