= Barred galaxias =

Barred galaxias may refer to:

- Galaxias olidus, also known as the South Australian minnow, or mountain galaxias
- Galaxias fuscus, also known as the brown galaxias.
