= Brown galaxias =

Brown galaxias may refer to:

- Galaxias fuscus
- Galaxias olidus, also known as the South Australian minnow, or mountain galaxias
