= Galaxias tholus =

Scientific classification
- Kingdom: Animalia
- Phylum: Chordata
- Class: Actinopterygii
- Order: Galaxiiformes
- Family: Galaxiidae
- Genus: Galaxias
- Species: †G. tholus

Binomial name
- †Galaxias tholus Schwarzhans et al., 2023

Extinct species of fish

Galaxias tholus is an extinct species of Galaxias known from the early Miocene Bannockburn Formation of New Zealand. There are several other species of extinct galaxiid known from this formation.
