= Galaxias tantangara =

Conservation status
- Critically Endangered (IUCN 3.1)

Scientific classification
- Kingdom: Animalia
- Phylum: Chordata
- Class: Actinopterygii
- Order: Galaxiiformes
- Family: Galaxiidae
- Genus: Galaxias
- Species complex: Mountain galaxias
- Species: G. tantangara

Binomial name
- Galaxias tantangara Raadik, 2014

Species of fish

Galaxias tantangara, commonly known as the stocky galaxias, is a galaxiid of the genus Galaxias, a member of the Mountain galaxias species complex group of freshwater fish, found in Australia. Only discovered in 2014, the fish is classed as critically endangered, mainly because of being preyed upon by introduced species of trout.

== Description ==
As for other members of the species complex with a long tubular body which is distinctly stocky, particularly between the vent and the pectoral fins. Tail fin generally as long or slightly longer than the caudal peduncle with a square or slightly notched end. Flanges on the caudal peduncle are long, extending almost halfway to the anal fin. Centreline fins are somewhat fleshy at the base, paired fins less so. Fins generally rounded and paired fins set low on the body. Medium sized head, wider than deep, top of head between the eyes flat to slightly convex with the eyes well below the upper surface of the head. Mouth has a wide gape with the lower jaw being about 80-90 percent of the upper jaw length. Length up to 103 millimetres (4.1 in), commonly 75–85 millimetres (3.0–3.3 in).

Colour mostly dark olive-brown on the back and sides above the lateral line with the sides of the body in front of the anal fin becoming lighter and cream on the belly surfaces. Base colour overlain with many small dark markings joining into small to medium irregular blotches especially over the head and snout. Gill covers translucent and dusky; iris golden; fins translucent.

== Distribution ==
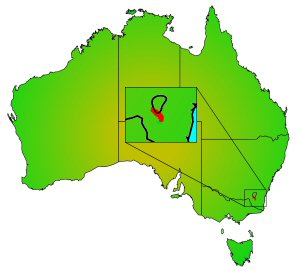
Distribution of Galaxias tantangara

The fish was first discovered in Australia in 2014, within the Kosciuszko National Park. It was reported only from the headwaters of Tantangara Creek above Tantangara Reservoir in the upper Murrumbidgee River system at an elevation of 1,360 metres (4,460 ft), and found only above a minor waterfall below which alien trout are present. They were restricted to about 4 kilometres (2.5 mi) of stream between the waterfall and the streams source at 1,630 metres (5,350 ft).

In late 2020, a second population was discovered at a second location, also in Kosciuszko National Park.

== Habitat ==
Galaxias tantangara is found in a cold, clear, and rapidly flowing alpine creek which flows through open Eucalypt forest with small shrubs and tussock grasses and is often covered with winter snow. The creek is about 80 centimetres (2.6 ft) wide and 10 centimetres (3.9 in) deep with pools around 30 centimetres (12 in) deep. Stream bed consists of bedrock and large to small rounded stones with some pebbles, gravel, and areas of silt. Cover is mostly provided by rock, undercut banks, overhanging vegetation and pools. The fish is able to withstand very cold water, below 5 °C (41 °F).

== Life cycle ==
The stocky galaxias is confined to freshwater, with no downstream migration to the sea or estuary during its life cycle. The spawning period is unknown, but likely to be in winter. Fish collected in mid-March showed some development of the gonads (filling around 50 percent of the body cavity), with one male and one female almost running ripe and the gonads filling 75 percent of the body cavity.

== Conservation status and measures ==
The stocky galaxias is classed as critically endangered by the IUCN as well as in Australia under the federal EPBC Act and the Fisheries Management Act 1994 in New South Wales. As of February 2023 there is no recovery or threat abatement plan for the fish in Australia.

A small team of scientists at the Thurgoona campus of Charles Sturt University (CSU) in Albury have been working on a captive breeding project since 2020, after the 2019–2020 bushfires burned in Kosciuszko National Park. Rescuers relocated 142 fish from Tantangara Creek first to a DPI Fisheries hatchery at Gaden in Jindabyne, and later 36 of them were taken to the Gulbali Institute at CSU. After several years of painstaking work involving fertilisation in a petri dish, the team managed to breed larvae in captivity in early 2023, and planned to translocate some of these to a new location in the wild at the end of March.

== Utility to humans ==
It is not an angling target due to small size and conservation status.
