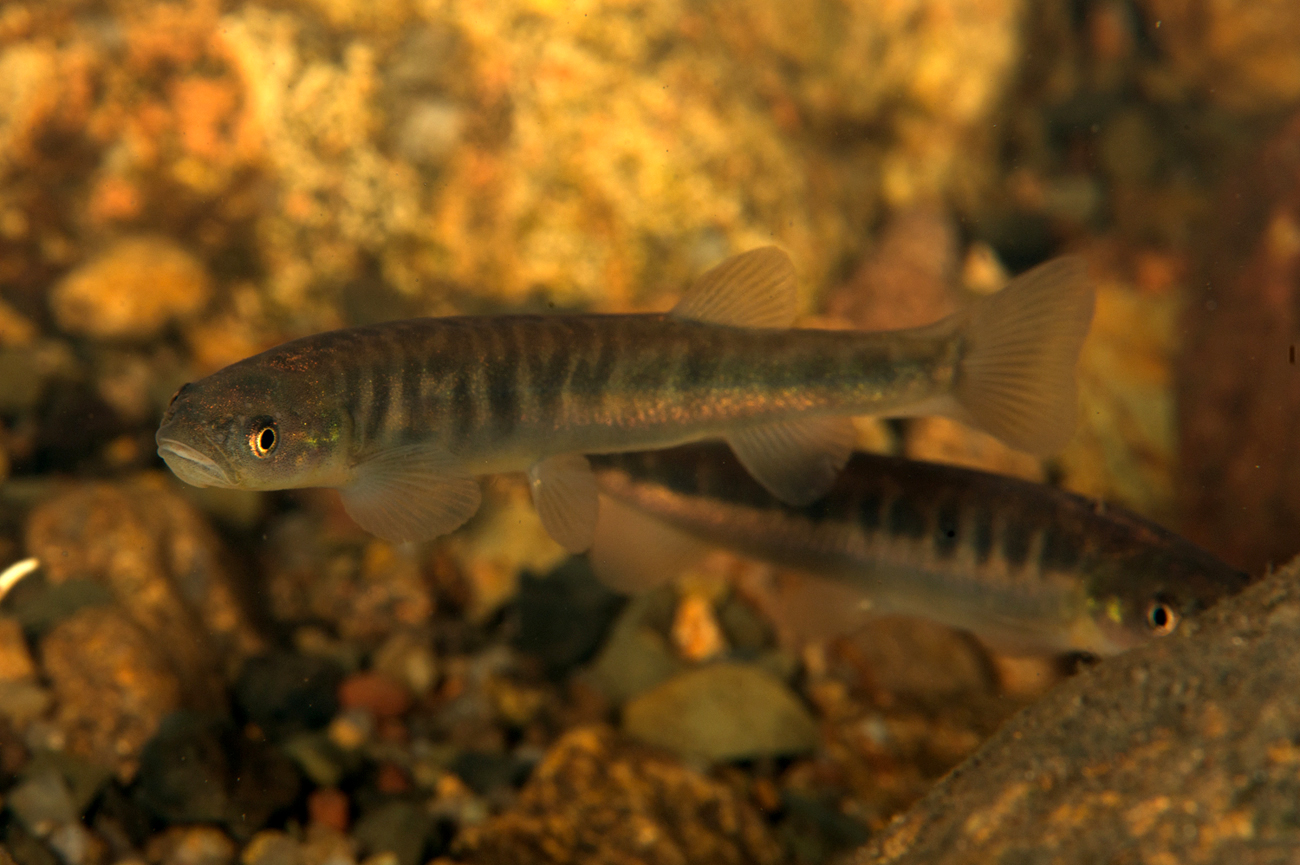
- Galaxias olidus

Scientific classification
- Kingdom: Animalia
- Phylum: Chordata
- Class: Actinopterygii
- Order: Galaxiiformes
- Family: Galaxiidae
- Genus: Galaxias
- Species complex: Mountain galaxias

= Mountain galaxias (species complex) =

Group of fishes

The mountain galaxias is a species complex of freshwater galaxiid fish found all over southeast Australia.

== Species complex ==
Recent studies have identified fifteen species within the complex including three previously known species (shown in this list by ‡)

- Galaxias aequipinnis, Raadik, 2014
- Galaxias arcanus, Raadik, 2014
- Galaxias brevissimus, Raadik, 2014
- ‡ Galaxias fuscus, Mack, 1936
- Galaxias gunaikurnai, Raadik, 2014
- Galaxias lanceolatus, Raadik, 2014
- Galaxias longifundus, Raadik, 2014
- Galaxias mcdowalli, Raadik, 2014
- Galaxias mungadhan, Raadik, 2014
- ‡ Galaxias olidus, Günther, 1866
- Galaxias oliros, Raadik, 2014
- ‡ Galaxias ornatus, Castelnau, 1873
- Galaxias supremus, Raadik, 2014
- Galaxias tantangara, Raadik, 2014
- Galaxias terenasus, Raadik, 2014

== Range ==
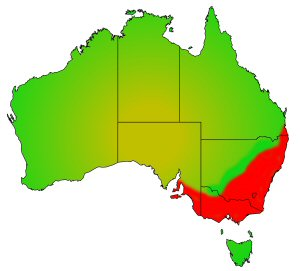
Range of the mountain Galaxias species complex

Mountain galaxias occupies a vast geographical range from southern Queensland to the Adelaide Hills in South Australia, and while occurring widely in the Murray-Darling river system, are also found in eastern and southern coastal systems. How much of their coastal distribution is due to natural river capture events (although it is certain much of it is) and how much of it may be due to migration is not clear, for many mountain galaxias species have the ability to "climb" natural migration barriers with modified pelvic fin structures. Individual species within the complex have ranges varying from across almost the entire range of the complex itself down to extremely restricted ranges within a single or only a very small number of catchments.
