= Blue Lake (New South Wales) =

Cirque lake in New South Wales, Australia

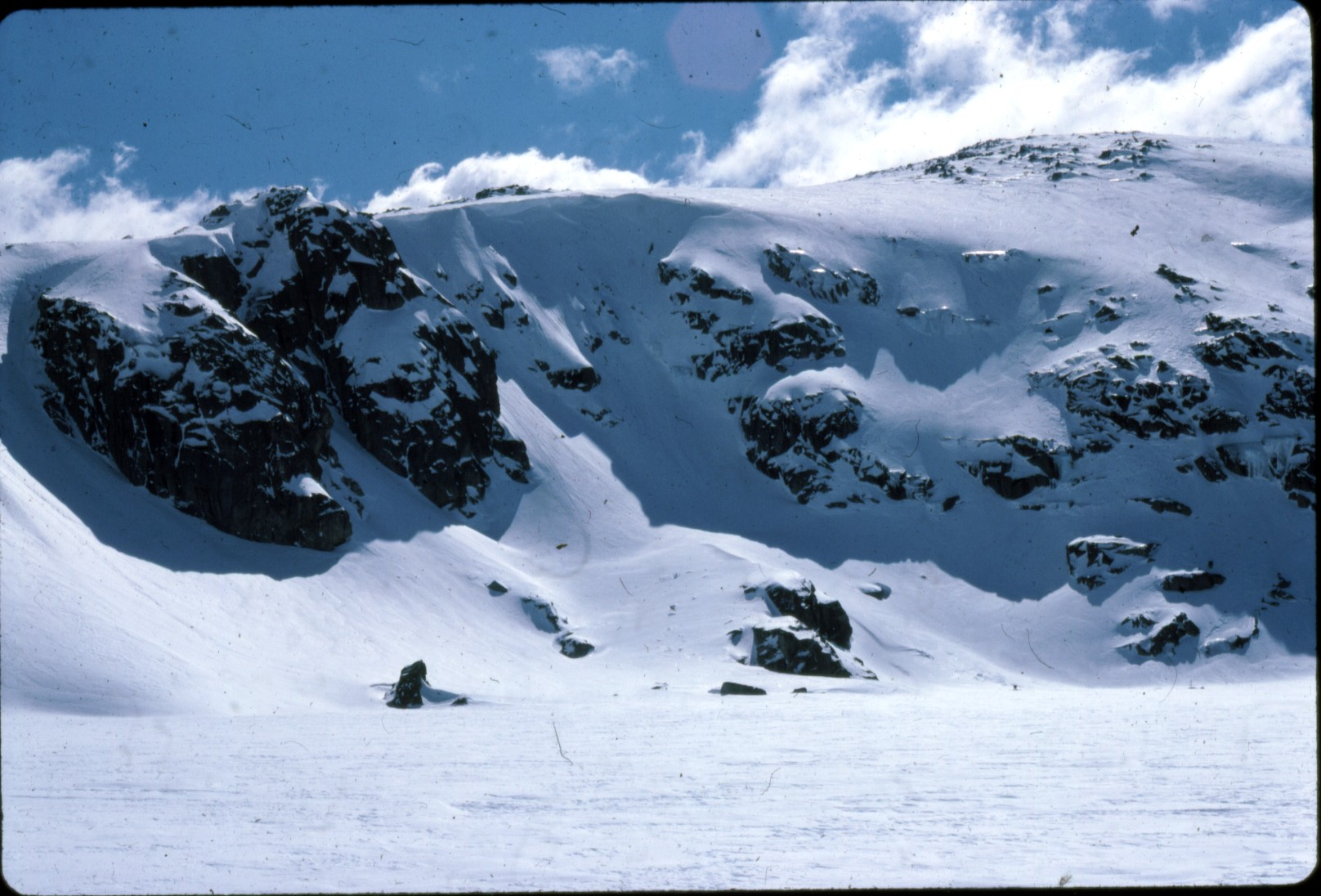
- Frozen Blue Lake

- Location in New South Wales
- Location: Snowy Mountains, New South Wales
- Coordinates: 36°24′13″S 148°18′54″E
- Type: Glacial cirque
- Primary inflows: Snowmelt
- River sources: Blue Lake Creek
- Basin countries: Australia
- Designation: Kosciuszko National Park; Australian Alps National Parks and Reserves; Ramsar site
- Surface area: 16 ha (40 acres)
- Max. depth: 28 m (92 ft)
- Surface elevation: 1,890 m (6,200 ft) AHD
- Frozen: June–October

Ramsar Wetland
- Designated: 17 March 1996
- Reference no.: 800

The Blue Lake is one of only four cirque lakes found in mainland Australia. The other three, Cootapatamba, Albina, and Club, are shallower and are held entirely by terminal moraines. Blue Lake's valley contains the best-developed glacial features in the Kosciuszko National Park alpine area of New South Wales. It was recognised as a wetland of international importance on 17 March 1996 when a 320-hectare (790-acre) area, comprising the lake and its surrounds, including nearby Hedley Tarn, was designated Ramsar Site 800 under the Ramsar Convention on wetlands. The lake lies within the Australian Alps National Parks and Reserves.

== Description ==
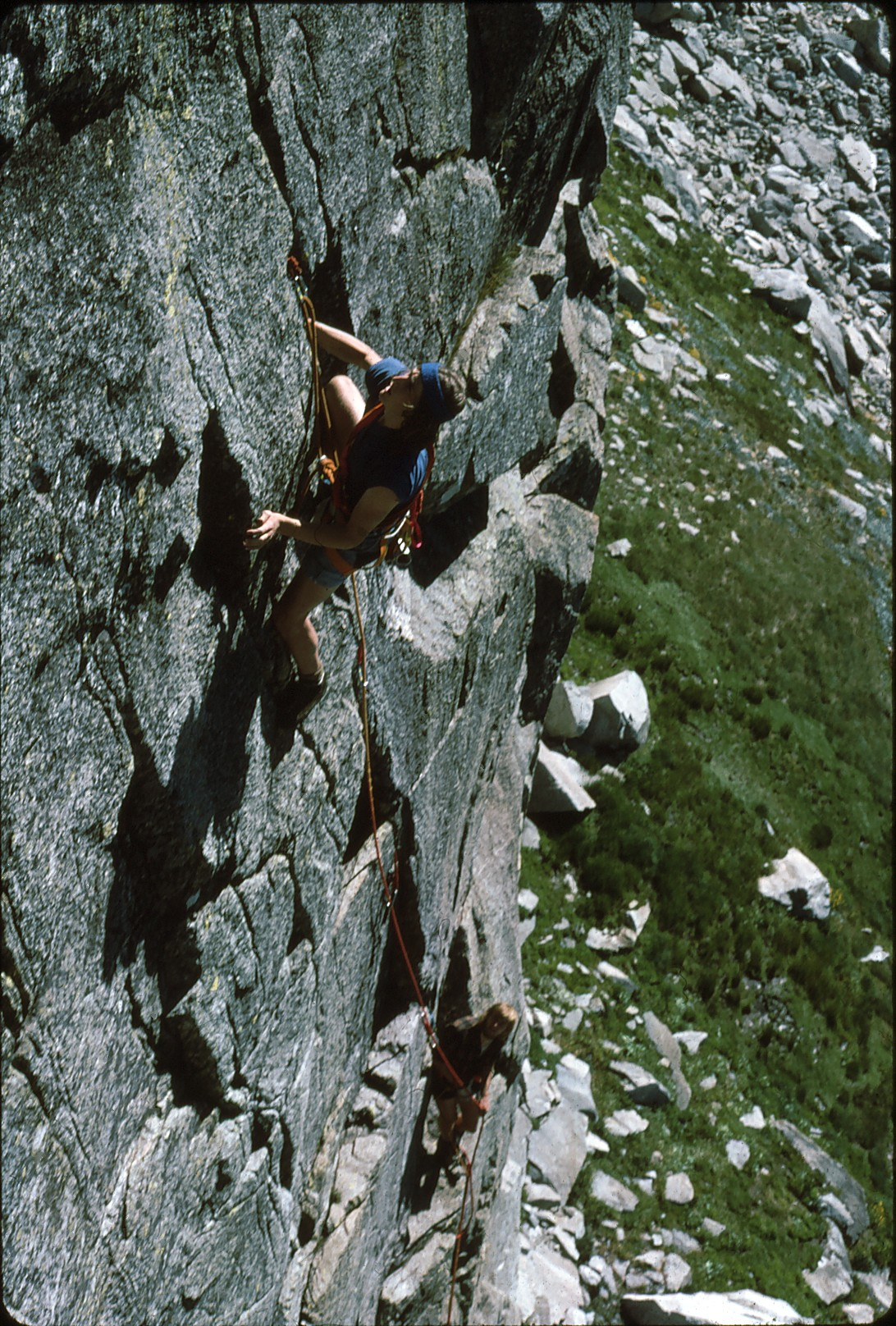
Peter Mills and John Eiseman climb Mindbender at Blue Lake in 1976.

Blue Lake is 16 hectares (40 acres) in area and 28 metres (92 ft) deep. Its surface is entirely open water, with boulders reaching the shore in the east and north east, and the other shores being pebbly. It lies about 28 kilometres (17 mi) west of Jindabyne and 3.5 kilometres (2.2 mi) north of Charlotte Pass at an altitude of 1,890 metres (6,200 ft) above mean sea level, in a glacial landscape.

The lake was formed when glaciers flowing from the Great Dividing Range converged and carved out a basin in the granite bedrock. It receives water from Blue Lake Creek, originating from Mount Twynam and from snowmelt. The surface of the lake is frozen for about four months of the year; it overflows in spring with the melting of the snow while, during the rest of the year, the water level remains stable.

== Flora and fauna ==
The lake is surrounded by alpine herbfield, heaths, bogs and fens supporting a range of native plants and animals, including rare, vulnerable and endangered species, as well as several kinds of invertebrate restricted to the alpine zone. Rare or threatened plants found within the Ramsar site include the branched carraway, wedge oschatzia and snow-wort, as well as the endangered ecological community of Montane Peatlands and Swamps. Threatened animals found there include the mountain pygmy possum and broad-toothed rat as well as the critically endangered fish the Kosciuszko galaxias.

== Access and usage ==
Blue Lake may be reached by a 2-hour walk from Charlotte Pass. Human activities in the area include environmental education, bushwalking, skiing, and ice climbing. Since all five glacial lakes in the Kosciuszko alpine area are naturally low in nutrients, to maintain nutrient balance and prevent contamination, camping is not permitted in the catchments of the glacial lakes.
