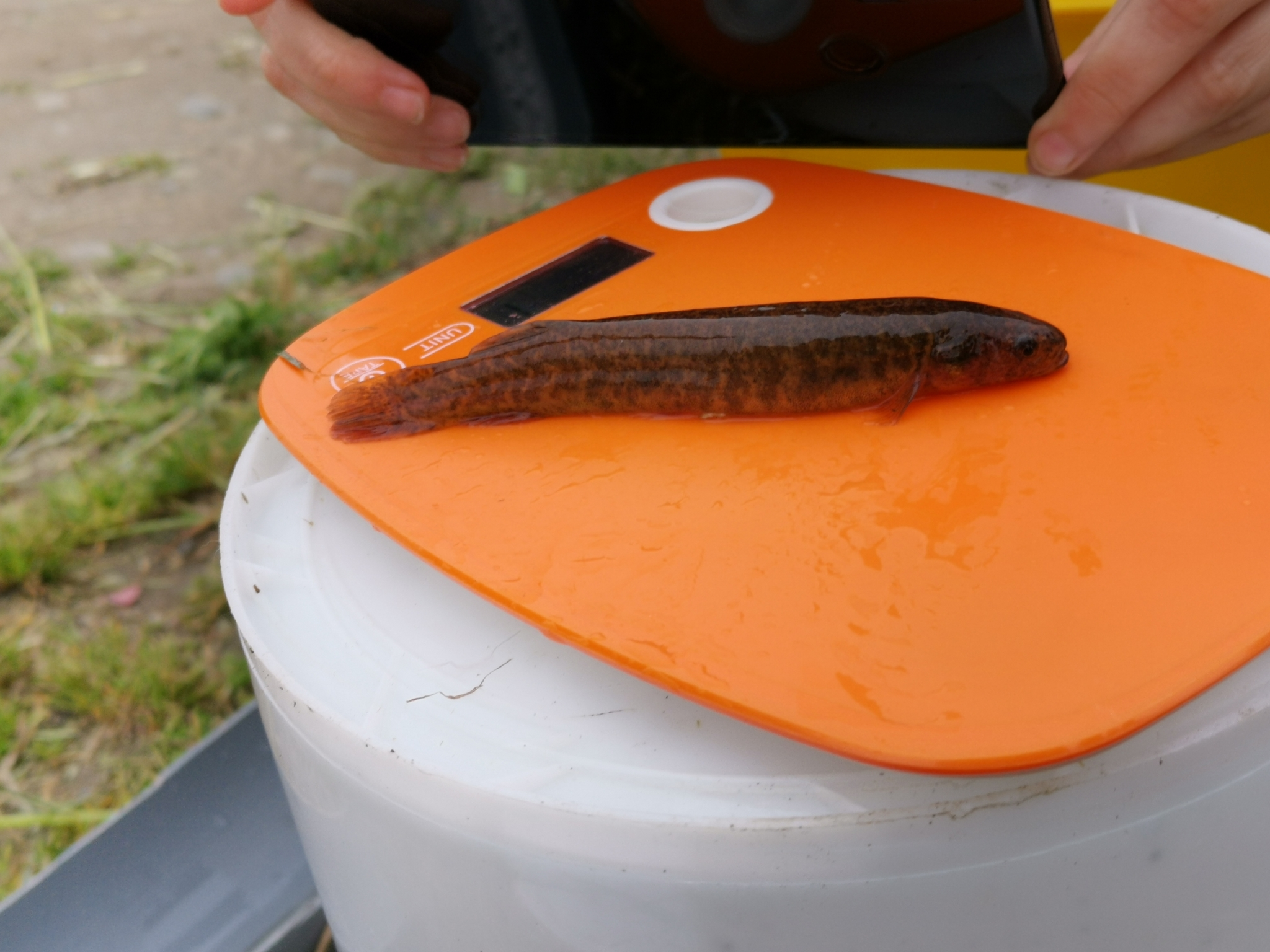

Conservation status
- Least Concern (IUCN 3.1)

Scientific classification
- Kingdom: Animalia
- Phylum: Chordata
- Class: Actinopterygii
- Order: Galaxiiformes
- Family: Galaxiidae
- Genus: Galaxias
- Species: G. platei

Binomial name
- Galaxias platei Steindachner, 1898

= Galaxias platei =

Species of ray-finned fish

Galaxias platei is a ray-finned fish of the genus Galaxias. It is commonly known as tollo, puye, puyen, or puyén grande.

It is native to temperate rivers and streams in southern South America on both sides of the Andes, including central and southern Chile south of Valdivia, and Argentina south of the Limay River, along the Patagonian Andes of both countries to Tierra del Fuego, and to the Falkland Islands. They are amphidromous, and found in marine, freshwater, brackish, and demersal habitats.
