= Galaxias arcanus =

Conservation status
- Least Concern (IUCN 3.1)

Scientific classification
- Kingdom: Animalia
- Phylum: Chordata
- Class: Actinopterygii
- Order: Galaxiiformes
- Family: Galaxiidae
- Genus: Galaxias
- Species complex: Mountain galaxias
- Species: G. arcanus

Binomial name
- Galaxias arcanus Raadik, 2014

Species of fish

Galaxias arcanus, the riffle galaxias, is a galaxiid of the genus Galaxias, a member of the mountain galaxias species complex group of freshwater fish, found in Australia.

== Description ==
Galaxias arcanus has the typical Galaxias body form, with a long tubular body and a maximum recorded standard length (SL) of 98 millimetres (3.9 in), typically 60–75 millimetres (2.4–3.0 in). Fins have slightly fleshy bases, although less so in the paired fins, and are thin, moderately long and generally paddle-shaped. The pelvic fins are inserted about midway along the SL, with the dorsal fin somewhat further back with the anal fin starting about even with or slightly before the rear end of the base of the dorsal fin. The caudal (tail) fin is moderately lobed and somewhat shorter than the caudal peduncle. Colour is overall beige to olive-brown becoming silvery white on the under sides. The main colouration is overlain with large blotchy darker makings usually merging into uneven bands, often overlaid with tiny dark grey spots. The body often has a horizontal band, sometime two, of gold or copper coloured flecks, also sometimes over the head and snout and sometimes extending onto the caudal peduncle.

== Distribution ==
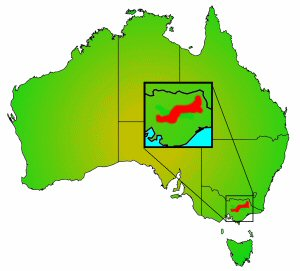
Galaxias arcanus distribution map

The riffle Galaxias range is confined to a narrow strip to the north of the Great Dividing Range in eastern Victoria, extending in the west to the head waters of the Golbourn river and in the east to the head waters of the Murray River. It has not yet been recorded from the Broken catchment in northern Victoria, but may be present with a restricted range limited to the cooler faster flowing areas. Not recorded in the Murray River downstream of the Albury area. May be limited to steeper streams in more upland areas by the need for variable substrates and faster water flows.

== Habitat ==
G. arcanus prefers cold to cool clear water in shallow 100–400 millimetres (3.9–15.7 in), fast flowing streams varying from 1–20 metres (3.3–65.6 ft) in width at an elevation of 150–880 metres (490–2,890 ft). The fish is generally found in high energy areas such as riffles and runs. The stream bottoms of the preferred areas mostly consist of pebbles and rocks with small amounts of bedrock, boulders and gravel. The fish are usually found in amongst or under rocks or in deeper water within the gaps in the substrate material. The fish are not usually found amongst instream vegetation, but sometimes occurs with submerged timber debris.

The riffle Galaxias is often found in streams with large number of predatory, introduced trout. The species preference for high velocity areas and its habit of hiding between rocks and pebbles on the stream bed together with its cryptic colouration appear to provide it with protection from predation. Risks identified for the species include inundation (thus providing access to predators) and drying out of the riffle zones, due to river regulation.

== Lifecycle and reproduction ==
The spawning period for G. arcanus is reported to probably be between October and December, possibly into January. Ripe to running-ripe adult fish have been collected in Corryong Creek (upper Murray) in early November and from the Acheron River (Goulburn R. catchment) in mid-October to mid-November. To complicate matters running ripe females have been recorded in late June in the upper Murray and nearly ripe from the Goulburn River system in May.

Juvenile fish have been observed in large loose shoals of more than fifty individuals moving upstream along the shallow edge of pools between riffle zones. This suggests that the younger fish engage in active upstream dispersal.
