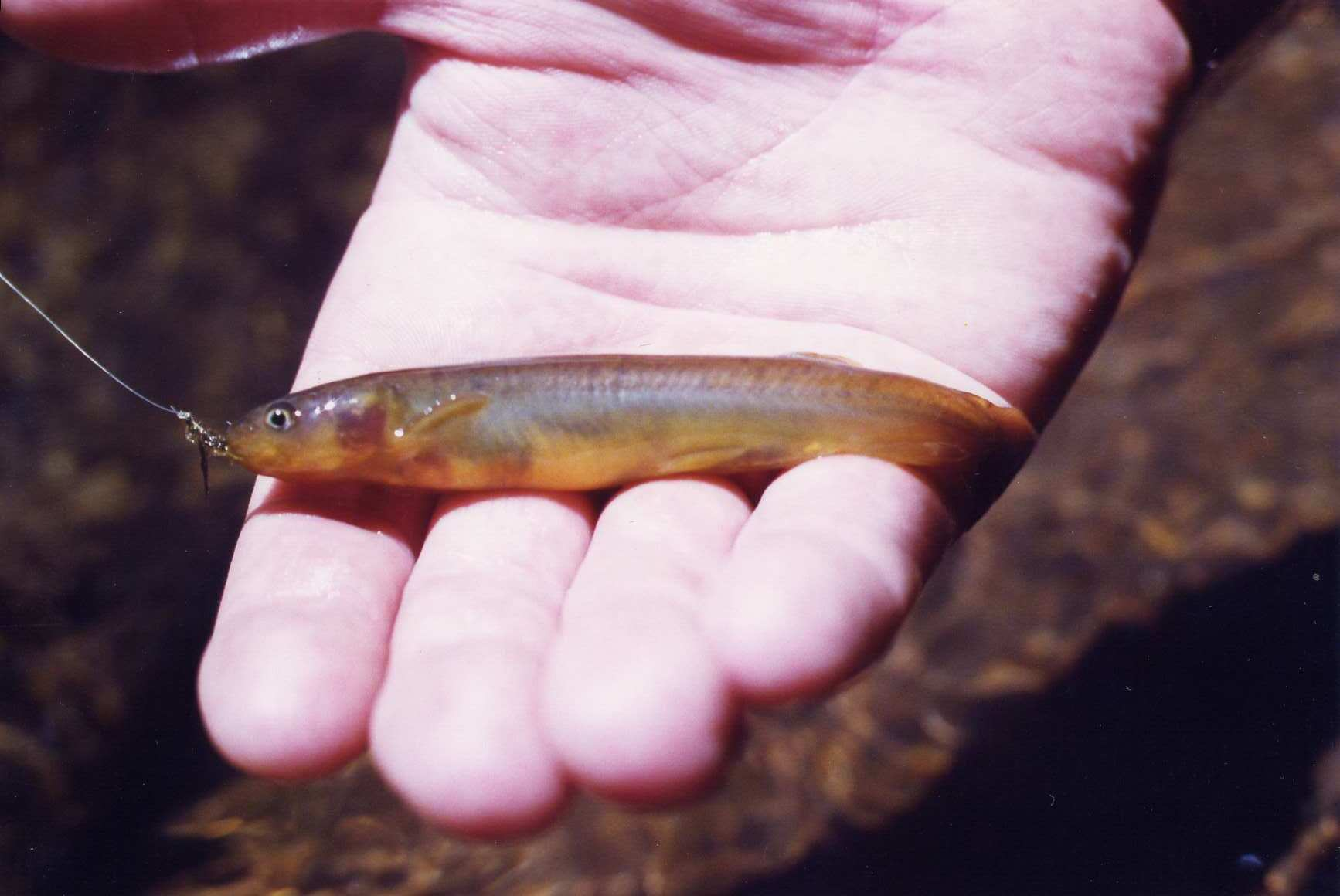
- A Galaxias olidus from southeast Australia

Scientific classification
- Kingdom: Animalia
- Phylum: Chordata
- Class: Actinopterygii
- Division: Teleostei
- Order: Galaxiiformes
- Family: Galaxiidae
- Subfamily: Galaxiinae
- Genus: Galaxias; G. Cuvier, 1816

= Galaxias =

Genus of fishes

Galaxias is a genus of small freshwater fish in the family Galaxiidae, and are frequently referred to as the galaxiids. These highly adaptable fish are typically found at temperate latitudes across the Southern Hemisphere.

Galaxiids are scaleless and somewhat tubular in body form, ranging from very slender to quite bulky. They are somewhat torpedo-shaped, with the dorsal and anal fins positioned close to the tail. They are generally small, with typical adults ranging between 4–15 cm (1.6–5.9 in) in total length, with some stocky species attaining around 25 cm (10 in). The largest, Galaxias argenteus, has been recorded at 58 cm (22.8 in; 1.9 ft), although 30–40 cm (12–16 in) is a more typical adult length.

== Distribution ==
Galaxiids are restricted to the Southern Hemisphere, and generally only occur in temperate latitudes. Only one species is known from subtropical habitats.

Galaxiids are the dominant group of native freshwater fish in New Zealand, and, along with the Percichthyidae, one of two dominant groups of native freshwater fish in southeastern Australia. Only one of the species (G. zebratus) is found in Africa, and only three (G. globiceps, G. maculatus, and G. platei) are found in South America. One species (G. neocaledonicus) is endemic to the New Caledonia

== Habitat ==
Galaxiids are coolwater species, with many wholly freshwater species specialising in high-altitude upland streams (including very small streams), rivers, and lakes. Some galaxiids include a marine stage in their lifecycles where larvae are washed out to sea to develop, and return to rivers as juveniles. This type of diadromous fish migration is known as amphidromy. These species are consequently also found in low-altitude habitats, but frequently migrate to high-altitude reaches of river systems in their adult stage.

== Threats ==
Wholly freshwater galaxiids are gravely threatened by exotic salmonid species, particularly exotic trout species, which prey heavily upon them and compete with them for food and habitat. This is a major concern, as exotic trout species have been introduced to many different land masses (e.g. Australia, New Zealand, South Africa) with no thought as to impacts on native fish such as galaxiids, and no attempt to preserve some exotic trout-free habitats for native fish.

In most situations, wholly freshwater galaxiids are unable to persist in the presence of exotic trout species, and many are now restricted to the few remaining trout-free habitats. Where these species are found in the presence of trout, the galaxiids usually consist entirely of individuals which dispersed there from an upstream trout-free population, and are not self-sustaining. Numerous localised extinctions of wholly freshwater galaxiid species (i.e. mountain galaxias) have been caused by the introduction of exotic trout species (including ongoing illegal stockings) and a number of wholly freshwater galaxiid species are threatened with extinction by exotic trout species and other exotic salmonids.

Introduced salmoniids also have a negative impact on diadromous galaxiids, competing with them for food and habitat, as well as preying on them. However, the impact is not as great and they appear to be able to persist in the presence of trout.

== Species ==
The 46 recognized species in this genus are:

- Galaxias aequipinnis Raadik, 2014 (East Gippsland Galaxias)
- Galaxias anomalus Stokell, 1959 (Roundhead Galaxias)
- Galaxias arcanus Raadik, 2014 (Riffle Galaxias)
- Galaxias argenteus Gmelin, 1789 (Giant Kōkopu)
- Galaxias auratus Johnston, 1883 (Golden Galaxias)
- Galaxias brevipinnis Günther, 1866 (Climbing Galaxias)
- Galaxias brevissimus Raadik, 2014 (Short-tail Galaxias)
- Galaxias cobitinis McDowall & Waters, 2002 (Lowland Long-jawed Galaxias)
- Galaxias depressiceps McDowall & Wallis, 1996 (Flathead Galaxias)
- Galaxias divergens Stokell, 1959 (Dwarf Galaxias)
- Galaxias eldoni McDowall, 1997 (Eldon's Galaxias)
- Galaxias fasciatus Gray, 1842 (Banded Kōkopu)
- Galaxias fontanus Fulton, 1978 (Swan Galaxias)
- Galaxias fuscus Mack, 1936 (Barred Galaxias)
- Galaxias globiceps C. H. Eigenmann, 1928
- Galaxias gollumoides McDowall & Chadderton, 1999 (Gollum Galaxias)
- Galaxias gracilis McDowall, 1967 (Dwarf Inanga)
- Galaxias gunaikurnai Raadik, 2014 (Shaw Galaxias) – found in the Australian Shaw Creek, Macalister River catchment, state of Victoria, Australia
- Galaxias johnstoni Scott, 1936 (Clarence Galaxias) – found in the Tasmanian Clarence Lagoon, Derwent River catchment
- Galaxias lanceolatus Raadik, 2014 (Tapered Galaxias)
- Galaxias longifundus Raadik, 2014 (West Gippsland Galaxias)
- Galaxias macronasus McDowall & Waters, 2003
- Galaxias maculatus Jenyns, 1842 (Common Galaxias)
- Galaxias mcdowalli Raadik, 2014 (McDowall's Galaxias)
- Galaxias mungadhan Raadik, 2014 (Dargo Galaxias) – found in the Dargo River, Mitchell River catchment, Alpine and East Gippsland, state of Victoria, Australia
- Galaxias neocaledonicus Weber & de Beaufort, 1913 – found in New Caledonia
- Galaxias niger Andrews, 1985 (Black Galaxias)
- Galaxias occidentalis Ogilby, 1899 (Western Galaxias)
- Galaxias olidus Günther, 1866 (Mountain Galaxias)
- Galaxias oliros Raadik, 2014 (Obscure Galaxias)
- Galaxias ornatus Castelnau, 1873 (Ornate Galaxias)
- Galaxias parvus Frankenberg, 1968 (Small Pedder Galaxias) – found in the Tasmanian Lake Pedder
- Galaxias paucispondylus Stokell, 1938 (Alpine Galaxias) – found in the Southern Alps of New Zealand
- Galaxias pedderensis Frankenberg, 1968 (Pedder Galaxias) – found in the Tasmanian Lake Pedder
- Galaxias platei Steindachner, 1898
- Galaxias postvectis F. E. Clarke, 1899 (Short-jaw Kōkopu)
- Galaxias prognathus Stokell, 1940 (Long-jaw Galaxias)
- Galaxias pullus McDowall, 1997 (Dusky Galaxias)
- Galaxias rostratus Klunzinger, 1872 (Flathead Galaxias)
- Galaxias supremus Raadik, 2014 (Kosciuszko Galaxias) – found in the Australian Kościuszko National Park (pronounced: /ˌkɒziˈʌskoʊ/, KOZ-ee-USK-oh) in New South Wales.
- Galaxias tantangara Raadik, 2014 (Stocky Galaxias) – endemic to the Australian Tantangara Creek in the upper Murrumbidgee River system of the Kościuszko National Park
- Galaxias tanycephalus Fulton, 1978 (Saddled Galaxias)
- Galaxias terenasus Raadik, 2014 (Roundsnout Galaxias)
- Galaxias truttaceus Valenciennes, 1846 (Spotted Galaxias)
- Galaxias vulgaris Stokell, 1949 (Common River Galaxias)
- Galaxias zebratus Castelnau, 1861 (Cape Galaxias) – endemic to South Africa's Western Cape

The genus also contains several extinct species, including:

- †Galaxias angustiventris Schwarzhans et al., 2012 - Bannockburn Formation, New Zealand
- †Galaxias brevicauda Schwarzhans et al., 2012 - Bannockburn Formation, New Zealand
- †Galaxias bobmcdowalli Schwarzhans et al., 2012 - Bannockburn Formation, New Zealand
- †Galaxias tholus Schwarzhans et al., 2023 - Bannockburn Formation, New Zealand
- †Galaxias papilionis Schwarzhans et al., 2012 - Bannockburn Formation, New Zealand
- †Galaxias parvirostris Schwarzhans et al., 2012 - Bannockburn Formation, New Zealand
- †Galaxias tabidus Schwarzhans et al., 2012 - Bannockburn Formation, New Zealand
