= Galaxias oliros =

Conservation status
- Least Concern (IUCN 3.1)

Scientific classification
- Kingdom: Animalia
- Phylum: Chordata
- Class: Actinopterygii
- Order: Galaxiiformes
- Family: Galaxiidae
- Genus: Galaxias
- Species complex: Mountain galaxias
- Species: G. oliros

Binomial name
- Galaxias oliros Raadik, 2014

Australian fish species

Galaxias oliros, the obscure galaxias, is a galaxiid of the genus Galaxias, a member of the mountain galaxias species complex group of freshwater fish, found in Australia.

== Description ==
Similar to other members of the species complex with a long tubular body, commonly 75–90 millimetres (3.0–3.5 in) to a maximum recorded of 133 millimetres (5.2 in), moderately deep and laterally compressed behind the pelvic fins. Upper surface evenly arched from the nape to the beginning of the tail fin, the belly follows a similar profile but less pronounced. Caudal peduncle is relatively shallow and strongly laterally compressed. Head medium sized, noticeably wider than deep and slightly to moderately wedge-shaped when viewed from the side. Eyes relatively large and set high on the head. Mouth positioned at the end of the snout, medium sized with a shorter lower jaw.

Fins fleshy at the base, less so in paired fins. Anal fin has a long base whereas the dorsal fin base is short. Fins rounded, dorsal fin medium length, anal fin about 10-20 percent longer than the dorsal fin. Leading edge of the anal fin usually at a position about halfway along the dorsal fin base. Pelvic fins medium sized and positioned low at about the midpoint of the body with the anal fin positioned halfway between the pelvic fins and the tail. Pectoral fins medium sized, rounded to paddle shaped, positioned low on the body with the upper edge even with or slightly higher than the rear end of the mouth. Tail fin is moderately long, weakly forked and usually longer than the caudal peduncle. Flanges medium height and length and quite well developed on the caudal peduncle, often extending as far forward as the rear of the anal fin.

Galaxias oliruos is mainly olive to grey brown over the back and sides extending over the head and snout, fading to cream or white to silvery below the lateral line and silvery on the belly. The base colour is overlaid with a pattern of small to medium sized dark irregularly shaped blotches with many joining up to form uneven vertical bands. These markings are more closely spaced over the upper surface including the nape but are not present on the head and snout and sometimes are very faint. Sometimes a medium thick row of copper to gold spots extends over the upper surface from the nape to the dorsal fin and occasionally there may be a slight scattering of small gold flecks over the head and snout. The gill covers are translucent with a large gold to silver or turquoise patch. Fins light grey to olive and translucent.

== Distribution ==
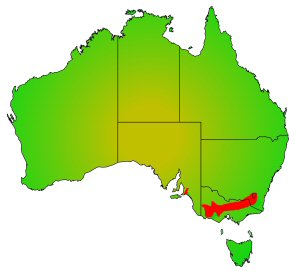
Distribution map of Galaxias oliros, the obscure galaxias

The obscure galaxias is found at a wide range of elevations from 0–600 metres (0–1,969 ft) in the Murray River system in Victoria and southern New South Wales as well as south of the Great Dividing Range in western Victoria including all tributaries to the Wimmera River and several tributaries to the Murray River within the Mount Lofty Ranges in South Australia. The fish is also recorded from coastal drainages in western Victoria including the Corangamite Basin, the Hopkins River and extending through to Mosquito Creek within the Bool Lagoon catchment in South Australia. Additionally, the fish is found very close to the sea in the Merri River and the Darlot/Fitzroy River systems in western Victoria.

== Habitat ==
Mainly inhabits lowland to foothill reaches of a diverse number of stream types including clear to turbid, medium to large 4–20 metres (13–66 ft) wide rivers, smaller (0.5–4 metres (1.6–13.1 ft)) gently to faster flowing creeks as well as anabranches, billabongs and occasionally wetlands. Juveniles are often found in shallow riffle zones around the edges of pools with adults in deeper pools 10–120 centimetres (0.33–3.94 ft) and more open areas. Usually found taking cover in heavy macrophytes or woody debris, but sometimes found in open water or near the surface. Can be very abundant in swamps.

== Lifecycle/Reproduction ==
The obscure galaxias lives its entire lifecycle in freshwater. It has high tolerance for water conditions being found in very turbid or highly saline pools or stagnant water with high amounts of organic material. Spawning generally occurs from late May to early July but sometimes as late as August. Eggs are quite small 0.9–1.0 millimetre (0.035–0.039 in) and the females are relatively fecund for members of the species complex, for example one 105.6 millimetres (4.16 in) female was recorded with 2057 eggs.

== Conservation ==
It is listed as least concern under the IUCN Red List.

== Utility to humans ==
Not an angling target due to small size.
