= Notochen =

Notochen Temporal range: early Miocene, 19–16 Ma

Scientific classification
- Kingdom: Animalia
- Phylum: Chordata
- Class: Aves
- Order: Anseriformes
- Family: Anatidae
- Genus: †Notochen; Worthy et al., 2022
- Species: †N. bannockburnensis

Binomial name
- †Notochen bannockburnensis Worthy et al., 2022

Extinct genus of birds

Notochen (meaning "southern goose"), also called the Bannockburn swan, is an extinct genus of anatid bird from the Early Miocene Bannockburn Formation of Otago, New Zealand. The genus contains a single species, Notochen bannockburnensis, known from various fossil material.

== Discovery and naming ==
Notochen type locality near Otago, New Zealand

The Notochen holotype specimen, CM 2017.37.919, was discovered in the Bannockburn Formation (Manuherikia Group) near St Bathans, Otago, New Zealand. This specimen consists of the distal right humerus. Additional specimens, consisting of fragmentary coracoids and a proximal part of the right shaft of a humerus, were also referred to Notochen.

In 2022, Worthy et al. described Notochen bannockburnensis, a new genus and species of antatid, based on these fossil remains. The generic name, "Notochen", combines the Greek words "notios", meaning southern, and "chen," meaning "goose". The specific name, "bannockburnensis", refers to the geologic formation from which the fossils were recovered. Notochen represents the eighth anatid named from the St Bathans Fauna.

== Description ==
The describing authors concluded that Notochen would have had a body size comparable to extant swans. Along with the coeval Miotadorna, Notochen would have likely been a terrestrial grazer, while other anatids from the locality were mainly aquatic herbivores with diving and swimming adaptations.

== Classification ==
While the describing authors could not confidently refer Notochen to either Cygnini (swans) or Anserini (geese), they note that the proportions and large size of the fossil material suggest a more likely affinity to Cygnini.

== See also ==
- List of bird species described in the 2020s
