= Galaxias mcdowalli =

Conservation status
- Critically Endangered (IUCN 3.1)

Scientific classification
- Kingdom: Animalia
- Phylum: Chordata
- Class: Actinopterygii
- Division: Teleostei
- Order: Galaxiiformes
- Family: Galaxiidae
- Genus: Galaxias
- Species complex: Mountain galaxias
- Species: G. mcdowalli

Binomial name
- Galaxias mcdowalli Raadik, 2014

Species of fish

Galaxias mcdowalli, McDowall's galaxias, is a galaxiid of the genus Galaxias, a member of the mountain galaxias species complex group of freshwater fish, found in Australia.

Named in honor of Robert (Bob) Montgomery McDowall (1939-2011).

== Description ==
Similar to other members of the species complex with a long, tubular body; flattened on the back in front of the pelvic fins. Commonly 65–75 millimetres (2.6–3.0 in) in length to a maximum recorded size of 84 millimetres (3.3 in). Viewed from the side the back and belly surfaces are evenly arched from the snout to the tail, with the back slightly more so. Medium sized head, wider than deep with a slight wedge shape from the side view.

Fins somewhat fleshy at their bases, moderately long and rounded. Anal and dorsal fin bases roughly equal and moderately long. Pectoral fins relatively short and paddle shaped and low on the body. Pelvic fins also short and positioned about the mid point of the body. Tail of medium length with moderately well developed flanges along the caudal peduncle.

G. mcdowalli is mainly olive-brown over the back and sides above the lateral line extending to the top of the head and snout, fading to light brown to cream lower on the body and becoming white on the belly. Small to medium dark spots and blotches overlay the base colour with some joining up to form uneven vertical bars. There is a wide, mid side line of gold speckles tending to iridescent at the rear of the fish. A thin line of gold speckles exists on the middle of the back, running from the nape to the dorsal fin. Gill covers are translucent with a large gold patch; iris golden and fins translucent grey to light brown or olive-grey.

== Distribution ==
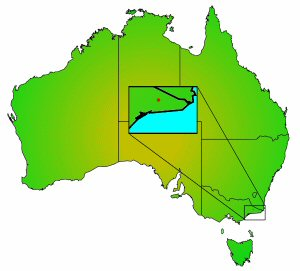
Distribution map of Galaxias mcdowalli, McDowall's Galaxias

Recorded from the headwaters of the Rodger River, a tributary of the Snowy River, in East Gippsland at an elevation 680 metres (2,230 ft). Not present in the mid to lower reaches of the Rodger River where introduced brown trout have colonised. It is believed an in-stream barrier has prevented further upstream migration of trout.

Historically, it is believed this species' range may have extended into the Snowy River and the lower Buchan River, prior to the introduction of brown trout which significantly reduced the range.

== Habitat ==
McDowall's galaxias is found in a cool, clear, heavily vegetated river. The river is shallow, 0.5 metres (1.6 ft) deep, and 3–5 metres (9.8–16.4 ft) wide with pools ranging from 1–2 metres (3.3–6.6 ft) in depth. The river bottom is mainly sand, silt and clay with some cobble and pebble areas. In-stream cover is provided by overhanging vegetation, undercut banks and woody debris.

== Lifecycle and reproduction ==
Limited to freshwater with no downstream migration to brackish water or the sea during its lifecycle. Spawning season unknown but believed to be late spring to summer.

== Conservation ==
Critically endangered, protected under the Victorian Flora and Fauna Guarantee Act 1988.

== Utility to humans ==
Not an angling target due to small size and conservation status.
