= Galaxias supremus =

Conservation status
- Critically Endangered (IUCN 3.1)

Scientific classification
- Kingdom: Animalia
- Phylum: Chordata
- Class: Actinopterygii
- Order: Galaxiiformes
- Family: Galaxiidae
- Genus: Galaxias
- Species complex: Mountain galaxias
- Species: G. supremus

Binomial name
- Galaxias supremus Raadik, 2014
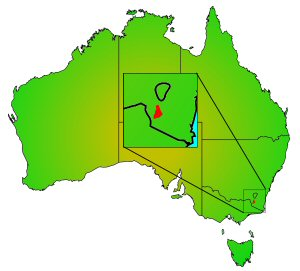
- Distribution of Galaxias supremus

Species of fish

Galaxias supremus, commonly known as the Kosciuszko galaxias, is a galaxiid of the genus Galaxias, a member of the Mountain galaxias species complex group of freshwater fish, found in Australia.

== Description ==
Similar to other members of genus Galaxias. The mouth is set low on the relatively long snout, and the dorsal, pelvic and anal, fins are well back along the body. The caudal peduncle is short and shallow, with the tail fin long at about 20% longer than the caudal peduncle. The dorsal and anal fins are short, with the anal fin set well back at about 85% from the front of the dorsal fin, the furthest back of all members of the species complex. Maximum recorded length 96 millimetres (3.8 in), commonly 80–85 millimetres (3.1–3.3 in).

It is light brown to tan over body and head and generally lighter below the lateral line, with the belly even lighter. The base colour is overlain by medium to large, darker, uneven blotches mostly joining together to form irregular bands, sometimes also overlain with a shading of tiny, closely packed dark grey spots. Occasionally small black bars are present mixed in with the blotches and spots around the midbody. The gills covers light brown with a medium-sized gold patch. The eyes are small with a golden iris. A thin band of gold spots is sometimes present on the upper surface between the nape and the dorsal fin. The head is covered with a scattering of diffuse gold flecks, and the body from behind the pectoral fins to the caudal peduncle has a band of gold to coppery spots concentrated mostly below the lateral line and towards the rear.

== Distribution ==
It is not well known, reported only from Blue Lake and its tributary Carruthers Creek in the headwaters of the Snowy River system on Mount Kosciuszko within Mount Kosciuszko National Park in New South Wales and at an elevation of 1,900–1,950 metres (6,230–6,400 ft). Changes to the historical distribution are unknown, but the presence of alien trout in the upper reaches of the Snowy River and within 2 km of the Blue Lake system is considered to be a restricting factor on its range.

== Habitat ==
The Kosciusko Galaxias is found in cold water in small, clear streams and one on-stream lake (Blue Lake). Stream width was 0.6–1.1 metres (2.0–3.6 ft) and depth was 50–60 centimetres (20–24 in). Stream beds consist of bedrock and boulders, through to gravel and sand; the lake bed consists of pebbles, gravel, and silt. It is able to withstand water below 2 °C (36 °F) for lengthy periods. All these waters are covered with snow and ice for long periods of time during winter. Fish have been collected mainly from pools in streams amongst rocks, undercut banks, and overhanging grasses. In the lake, fish were collected from rocks and small cobbles within 2 metres (6.6 ft) of the shore. The species' location and habitat in deeper waters of the lake are unknown.

== Lifecycle/reproduction ==
It is confined to freshwater, with an unknown spawning period likely to be late spring to early summer. Adult fish collected in mid-March were found to have mid-stage gonad development.

== Conservation ==
It is listed as critically endangered by the IUCN.

== Utility to humans ==
It is not an angling target due to small size its and conservation status.
