= Galaxias longifundus =

Conservation status
- Critically Endangered (IUCN 3.1)

Scientific classification
- Kingdom: Animalia
- Phylum: Chordata
- Class: Actinopterygii
- Order: Galaxiiformes
- Family: Galaxiidae
- Genus: Galaxias
- Species complex: Mountain galaxias
- Species: G. longifundus

Binomial name
- Galaxias longifundus Raadik, 2014

Species of fish

Galaxias longifundus, the West Gippsland galaxias, is a galaxiid of the genus Galaxias, a member of the mountain galaxias species complex group of freshwater fish, found in Australia.

== Description ==
Length commonly 65–80 millimetres (2.6–3.1 in), maximum recorded 97 millimetres (3.8 in). Similar to other members of the species complex. Body long and relatively deep, the back is flattened forward of the pelvic fins. Head medium sized, generally slightly shorter and distinctly wider than deep and wedge-shaped from the side. Snout moderately long and bluntly rounded viewed from the side.

Fins have fleshy bases although the paired fins less so. Fins rounded, anal and dorsal fins roughly the same length with the dorsal usually slightly longer. Pelvic fins positioned approximately mid way along the body, pectoral fins paddle shaped. Tail fin has distinctive flanges extending from across the caudal peduncle to nearly the end of the rays.

G. longifundus is mainly olive-brown across the back, head, snout, and the upper sides becoming light brown on the lower sides and cream on the belly. This is overlaid with a pattern of dark spots and blotches and a faint band of gold speckles along the mid sides. Gill cover is translucent with a small golden patch. Fins are olive-grey and translucent.

== Distribution ==
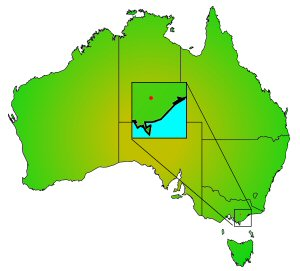
A distribution map of the West Gippsland galaxias, Galaxias longifundus

Recorded only from the east branch of Rintoul Creek in the La Trobe River catchment of Victoria at an elevation of 195–275 metres (640–902 ft). Not recorded downstream where introduced trout have colonised, or in adjacent catchments. Examination of museum specimens captured in the early twentieth century suggest this species may have been more widely distributed within the La Trobe system in the past, including perhaps, as far downstream as Traralgon.

== Habitat ==
The stream where this species has been recorded is small 2 metres (6.6 ft) in average width and shallow 50 centimetres (20 in) in average depth. It consists of a series of pools of an average depth of 90 centimetres (3.0 ft), interspersed with small and shallow 50 millimetres (2.0 in) riffle zones. The stream bottom is mostly boulder, cobble and pebbles with smaller areas of gravel, sand and clay. In-stream cover is provided mainly by rocks and lesser amounts of woody debris as well as overhanging banks and vegetation.

== Lifecycle/rproduction ==
Living its entire life in freshwater, unlike many other galaxias species this fish does not have a marine phase in its lifecycle. Breeding season is unknown, but believed to be during spring.

== Conservation ==
Critically endangered, protected under the Victorian Flora and Fauna Guarantee Act 1988.

== Utility to humans ==
Not an angling target due to small size and conservation status.
