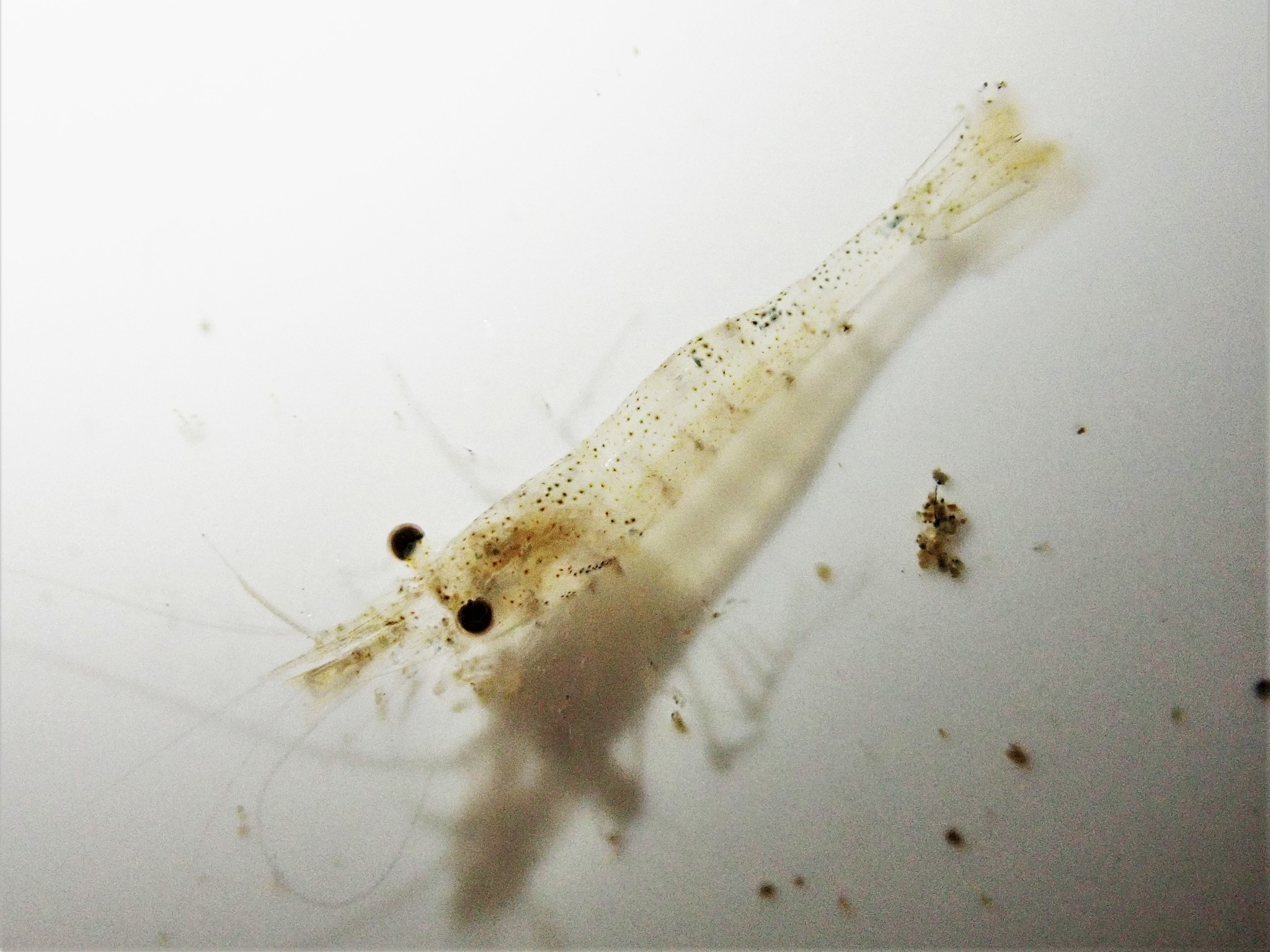
- Paratya curvirostris

Scientific classification
- Kingdom: Animalia
- Phylum: Arthropoda
- Clade: Pancrustacea
- Class: Malacostraca
- Order: Decapoda
- Suborder: Pleocyemata
- Infraorder: Caridea
- Family: Atyidae
- Genus: Paratya; Miers, 1882

= Paratya =

Genus of crustaceans

Paratya is a genus of freshwater shrimp of the family Atyidae, found in various islands in the Pacific Ocean. The split between the North Pacific clade (Japan) and the South Pacific clade (New Zealand, Australia, New Caledonia, Lord Howe Island) has been estimated to have occurred 19 to 12.5 million years ago.

== Species ==
There are 14 species recognised in the genus:

- Paratya annamensis Balss, 1924
- Paratya australiensis Kemp, 1917
- Paratya boninensis Satake & Cai, 2005
- Paratya borealis Volk, 1938
- Paratya bouvieri Roux, 1926
- Paratya caledonica Roux, 1926
- Paratya compressa (De Haan, 1844)
- Paratya curvirostris (Heller, 1862)
- Paratya howensis Roux, 1926
- Paratya improvisa Kemp, 1917
- Paratya intermedia Roux, 1926
- Paratya martensi Roux, 1925
- Paratya norfolkensis Kemp, 1917
- Paratya typa Roux, 1926
