= Galaxias aequipinnis =

Conservation status
- Critically Endangered (IUCN 3.1)

Scientific classification
- Kingdom: Animalia
- Phylum: Chordata
- Class: Actinopterygii
- Order: Galaxiiformes
- Family: Galaxiidae
- Genus: Galaxias
- Species complex: Mountain galaxias
- Species: G. aequipinnis

Binomial name
- Galaxias aequipinnis Raadik, 2014

Species of fish

Galaxias aequipinnis, the East Gippsland galaxias, is a galaxiid of the genus Galaxias, a member of the Mountain galaxias species complex group of freshwater fish, found in Australia.

== Description ==
A long tubular fish to 110 millimetres (4.3 in) in length, commonly 70–80 millimetres (2.8–3.1 in). Compared to other members of the G. olidus species complex G. aequipinnis is somewhat stout with a long head and snout. The lower jaw is shorter than the upper. Colour is brown on the sides of the head and snout extending to the upper surfaces and on the sides above the lateral line becoming lighter to cream on the lower sides and silvery white on the belly. Sides overlain with dark irregular marks, with some more or less joining together to form uneven vertical bands.

== Distribution ==
With a very restricted range, G. aequipinnis has been found at elevations of 250–390 metres (820–1,280 ft) AMSL in the Arte River and Little Arte River which are tributaries of the Goolengook River within the Bemm River catchment in East Gippsland.

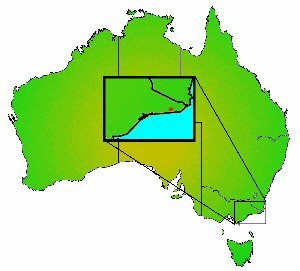
Distribution map of Galaxias aequipinnis

== Habitat ==
Small to moderate freshwater streams, 1.5–6.0 metres (4.9–19.7 ft) width and 150–400 millimetres (5.9–15.7 in) in depth, within heavily vegetated catchments, consisting of cool and clear to slightly tannin-stained water. Substrate is mostly bedrock with boulder and smaller rounded rocks as well as small amounts of gravel and coarse sand and larger areas of silt. Instream cover is mostly rock, overhanging vegetation and woody debris, with only smaller areas of macrophytes.

== Lifecycle/reproduction ==
A purely freshwater fish and unlike some members of the Galaxias family is not believed to undertake downstream migration to the sea as part of its lifecycle. Running ripe male and females with ovaries at an advanced stage of development have been collected in late May. However, to confuse the issue, some immature fish have also been collected in May indicating a possible late spawning with a hatching around the previous November or December.

== Utility to humans ==
This species is totally protected and is listed under the Victorian Flora and Fauna Guarantee Act, it is not an angling target
