= Galaxias ornatus =

Conservation status
- Least Concern (IUCN 3.1)

Scientific classification
- Kingdom: Animalia
- Phylum: Chordata
- Class: Actinopterygii
- Order: Galaxiiformes
- Family: Galaxiidae
- Genus: Galaxias
- Species complex: Mountain galaxias
- Species: G. ornatus

Binomial name
- Galaxias ornatus Castelnau, 1873

Species of fish

Galaxias ornatus, the ornate galaxias, is a galaxiid of the genus Galaxias, a member of the mountain galaxius species complex group of freshwater fish, found in Australia.

== Description ==
Generally, as for other members of the genus, body long, of medium depth, slightly compressed laterally with the middle of the back surface slightly flattened between the pelvic and pectoral fins. Body evenly arched from the base of the tail to the snout, slightly less so on the belly. Head medium-sized and noticeably wider than deep. Fins are generally fleshy, especially paired fins, rounded and of medium length. Pelvic fins moderately long about 90% of pectorals, which are paddle shaped. Maximum recorded size 110 millimetres (4.3 in), commonly 55–75 millimetres (2.2–3.0 in).

Colour tan to brown on the back and sides continuing over the head and snout, fading to creamy white on the lower surfaces. Base colour overlain with closely spaced dark blotches, some joining together to form unevenly shaped vertical stripes generally extending well below the lateral line. Some fish show a thin line of gold spots in the middle of the upper surface with a diffuse band of gold to coppery spots mostly below the lateral line and more prominently towards the rear of the fish. Gill covers translucent with a large golden spot. The eyes have a gold iris.

== Distribution ==
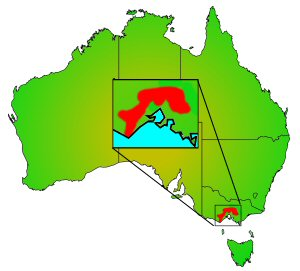
Distribution map of the ornate Galaxias

The ornate Galaxias is mainly confined to coastal systems south of the Great Dividing Range at elevations of 35–800 metres (115–2,625 ft) and probably up to 1,000 metres (3,300 ft) in Victoria between Wilsons Promontory and Cape Otway with a small population north of the Great Dividing Range in a minor creek in the upper reaches of the Yea River, a tributary to the Goulburn River system.

== Habitat ==
Galaxias ornatus is usually found in clear, cool and well shaded upland creeks along mountain ranges and in larger streams at lower elevations. Such streams are commonly 0.5–8 metres (1.6–26.2 ft) wide (up to 20 metres (66 ft)) and 5–30 centimetres (2.0–11.8 in) deep with pools of about 30–120 centimetres (0.98–3.94 ft) in depth. The stream beds are usually complex, varying from clay and sand to boulder, pebble and bedrock. In-stream cover is mostly provided by rock, large and small woody debris, aquatic and riparian vegetation as well as overhanging stream banks. To the north and west of Melbourne in drier systems such as the Maribyrnong, Plenty and Werribee rivers the fish persist in ephemeral tributaries as well as in large and small isolated, sometime stagnant, pools. To the north east of Melbourne at higher elevations such as in the upper Yarra catchment the species withstands periods of varying times during winter with the streams covered in snow.

== Lifecycle/Reproduction ==
Spawning occurs from June to mid August with adults ripe and near spawning from mid April. The fish remains confined to freshwater and does not migrate downstream to the estuary or the sea like many other Galaxias species.

== Conservation ==
Least concern.

== Utility to humans ==
Not an angling target due to small size.
