= Galaxias brevissimus =

Conservation status
- Critically Endangered (IUCN 3.1)

Scientific classification
- Kingdom: Animalia
- Phylum: Chordata
- Class: Actinopterygii
- Order: Galaxiiformes
- Family: Galaxiidae
- Genus: Galaxias
- Species complex: Mountain galaxias
- Species: G. brevissimus

Binomial name
- Galaxias brevissimus Raadik, 2014

Species of fish

Galaxias brevissimus, the short-tail galaxias, is a galaxiid of the genus Galaxias, a member of the mountain galaxias species complex group of freshwater fish, found in Australia.

== Description ==
Galaxias brevissimus is a fish with a typical Galaxiid body form, with a long and tubular body, but distinguishable from other members of the family by a short caudal fin (tail) and caudal peduncle, hence the common name. Size is commonly to 70–75 millimetres (2.8–3.0 in), maximum recorded is 95 millimetres (3.7 in). The colouration is generally a mottled brown on the upper surface and sides above lateral line, with this pattern continuing over the head and snout. The colouration is lighter below the lateral line becoming light brown or cream on the belly.

== Distribution ==
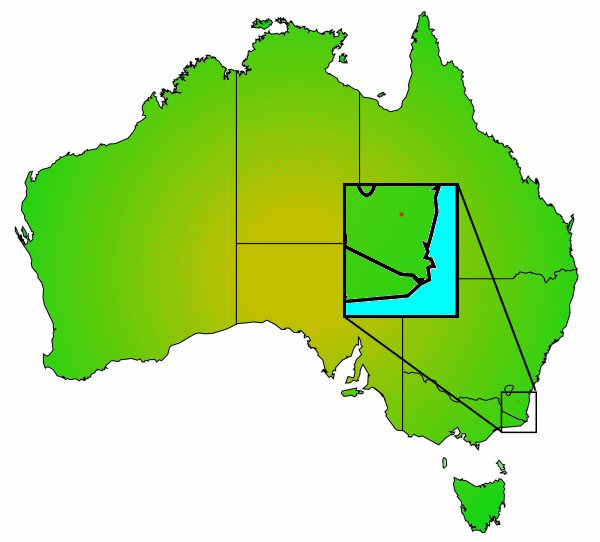
Distribution map of Galaxias brevissimus

This species has only been recorded from a creek in the very upper reaches of the coastal Tuross River catchment in south eastern New South Wales. The location is at an elevation of 950 metres (3,120 ft) AMSL about 12 kilometres (7.5 miles) downstream from the source which is itself 1,190 metres (3,900 ft) AMSL. The downstream distribution is unknown, but may have been more widespread in the past before the advent of introduced trout, which appear to have reduced and broken up its range.

== Habitat ==
A wholly freshwater fish without a salt water phase in its lifecycle, G. brevissimus has only been found in one clear, open and gently flowing, small creek that was about 1 metre (3.3 ft) across and around 300 millimetres (12 in) deep. The maximum recorded pool depth was 90 centimetres (35 in). The creek consisted mostly of small pools connected by very short and shallow riffles with a creek bed of clay covered by sand, plus areas of silt. Cover within the creek was provided by rock, macrophytes and overhanging grass. Creek side vegetation had been cleared for grazing, being replaced by pasture and grass tussocks. The general area surrounding the creek where the fish were recorded was disturbed, as a result of clearing for grazing.

== Lifecycle/Reproduction ==
Breeding biology is unknown, however all adults examined during mid March were at an early stage of gonad development. The smallest fish collected during this time, 49.4 millimetres (1.94 in), indicates a possible breeding season of late winter or early spring. Galaxias brevvissimus is not believed to migrate to the sea or the estuary during its life cycle.

== Utility to humans ==
Not an angling target due to small size and conservation status.
