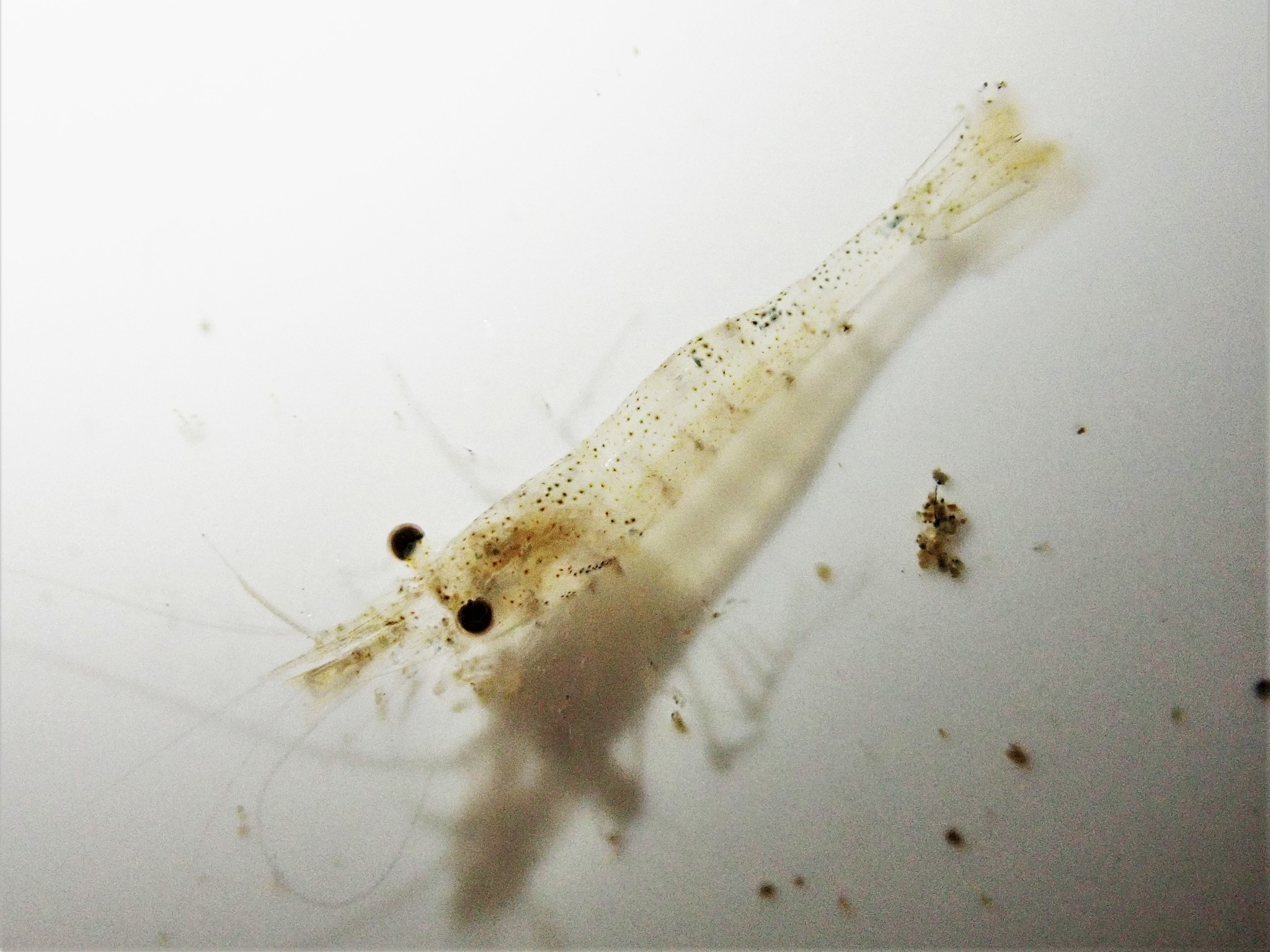

Conservation status
- Least Concern (IUCN 3.1)

Scientific classification
- Kingdom: Animalia
- Phylum: Arthropoda
- Class: Malacostraca
- Order: Decapoda
- Suborder: Pleocyemata
- Infraorder: Caridea
- Family: Atyidae
- Genus: Paratya
- Species: P. curvirostris

Binomial name
- Paratya curvirostris (Heller, 1862)

= Paratya curvirostris =

Species of crustacean

Paratya curvirostris is a species of freshwater shrimp in the family Atyidae. It is endemic to New Zealand, where it is distributed from North Island to Stewart Island, and including the Chatham Islands. It is the only true decapod shrimp to inhabit freshwater in New Zealand.

== Names ==
In the indigenous Māori language, Paratya curvirostris is known by several names: koeke, kōuraura, mōwhīwhiti and tarawera.

== Description ==
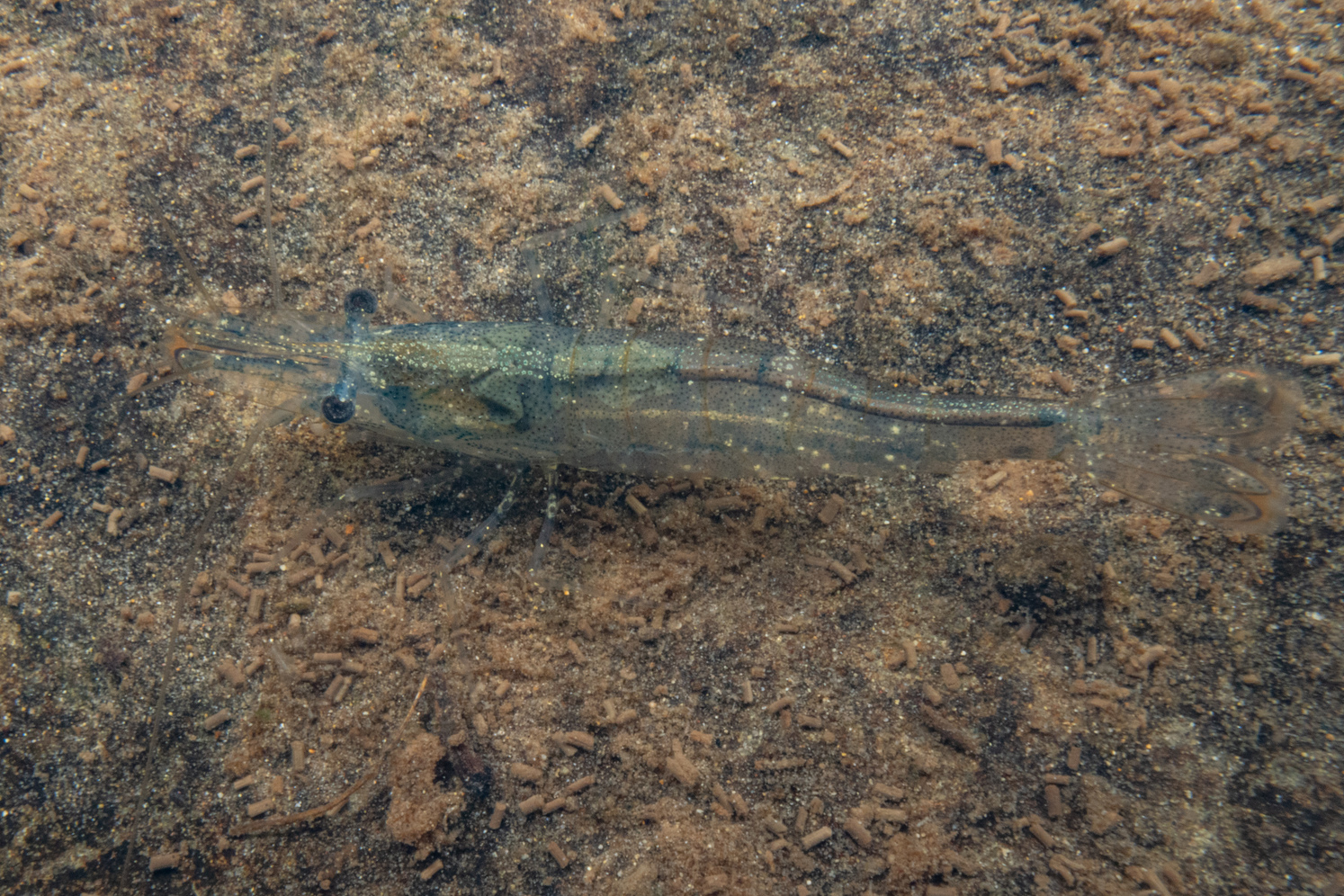
Paratya curvirostris found in the Opanuku Stream

Paratya is distinguished from all other decapod shrimps by the specialised form of the first two pairs of chelipeds, which possess clusters of brushing setae or small hairs to pick up food. This shrimp feeds mainly by scraping detritus from the leaves of aquatic plants (Elodea spp. and milfoils), sometimes with all four chelipeds, bringing the organic material to the mouthparts where larger particles are shredded by the third pair of maxillipeds. It also eats small invertebrates such as midges.

Adults grow up to 25mm in length. Sex can be identified by differences in the first two pairs of pleopods, the male having larger endopodites. The female carries up to 4000 eggs and once they are deposited, cleans them and provides water flow by beating her pleopods. Eggs took about 28 days to hatch in a laboratory experiment. Larvae are at first planktonic, with fewer limbs and segments. From studies it has been suggested that first stage larvae migrate to the rivermouth to develop in saltwater, moving up the river or stream to less saline water in the later stages.

== Habitat ==
This species was common to abundant in a widespread range, but is now somewhat reduced with a patchy distribution, largely due to the introduction of trout to certain areas. It is rarely found above 40 meters in elevation.
