= Galaxias mungadhan =

Conservation status
- Critically Endangered (IUCN 3.1)

Scientific classification
- Kingdom: Animalia
- Phylum: Chordata
- Class: Actinopterygii
- Order: Galaxiiformes
- Family: Galaxiidae
- Genus: Galaxias
- Species complex: Mountain galaxias
- Species: G. mungadhan

Binomial name
- Galaxias mungadhan Raadik, 2014

Australian fish species

Galaxias mungadhan, the Dargo galaxias, is a galaxiid of the genus Galaxias, a member of the mountain galaxias species complex group of freshwater fish, found in Victoria, Australia.

== Description ==
Similar to other members of the mountain galaxias species complex with a long, tubular body, commonly 70–80 millimetres (2.8–3.1 in) in length, maximum recorded 110 millimetres (4.3 in). Head medium-sized noticeably wider than deep. Back surface of body flattened behind the pectoral fins. Mouth at the tip of the snout angling back and down. Front of upper lip about level with the middle of the eye with the rearmost end of the mouth reaching about one third the way back from the leading edge of the eye. Dorsal and anal fins short and rounded, usually of equal length. Pectoral fins low on body, longish and paddle-shaped, about 20 percent longer than the pelvic fins which in turn are positioned about midway along and low on the body. Tail fin medium length with low but well developed flanges extending from the fin to a position just behind the rear end of the anal fin.

The Dargo galaxias is generally dark brown overall, darker above the lateral line, becoming brown on the belly. The base colour is overlain with irregular somewhat diffuse blotches, more concentrated above the lateral line. The sides of the trunk have a moderately wide band of gold spots or flecks extending from behind the nape to about even with the dorsal fin, but sometimes extending as far forward as the head and snout. The head is diffusely covered with a scattering of small gold flecks. Extending from behind the pectoral fins to the caudal peduncle is a diffuse band of gold spots generally below the lateral line and most prominent on the rear end of the fish.

== Distribution ==
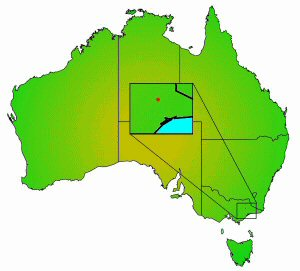
Distribution map of Galaxias mungadhan, the Dargo galaxias

Restricted to a 4 kilometres (2.5 mi) section above a natural barrier, of a tributary of the Dargo River within the Mitchell River system in Gippsland. Believed to have historically been present throughout the upper Dargo River catchment prior to the introduction of brown trout.

== Habitat ==
The stream the Dargo galaxias has been recorded from is a clear, cool alpine creek surrounded by a grassy plain. The creek is small, averaging 0.5–1.3 metres (1.6–4.3 ft) in width and 50–400 millimetres (2.0–15.7 in) in depth, and made up mainly of riffles and pools with the pools averaging 500 millimetres (20 in) deep. Often covered with snow for periods in winter. Bottom of stream is mainly bedrock and a few boulders with small amounts of pebble, gravel, sand and clay. Cover mostly rock and some overhanging alpine grasses.

== Lifecycle/Reproduction ==
Confined to freshwater for its entire lifecycle, Galaxias mungadhan is the only native fish recorded within its current range. Spawning time is unknown and is possibly different from year to year depending on conditions, however gonads of adults collected during mid April 2008 were at an advanced stage of development consistent with a winter/spring spawning season. Collection of juvenile fish, presumed young of the year, of various lengths at different times suggest an extended spawning season from late winter to spring. Able to withstand very cold water less than 5 °C (41 °F).

== Utility to humans ==
Not an angling target due to small size and conservation status.

== Conservation status and measures ==
Critically endangered, protected under the Victorian Flora and Fauna Guarantee Act 1988. F

=== Post 2019–2020 fires ===
Staff from the Arthur Rylah Institute in February 2020 travelled to the Dargo River near Mount Hotham and captured about 200 Dargo galaxias to be brought into captivity as an insurance population while the ash and debris from the 2019–2020 bushfires in Australia moved through the system. The ash and debris causes low dissolved oxygen and can clog the gills of the fish. The intention was to return the fish to the stream once the water is again clear and riparian vegetation has recovered, probably after about four months.
