= Lake Manuherikia =

Former lake in New Zealand

- Approximate modern-day equivalent location of Lake Manuherikia
- Location: Miocene Central Otago
- Coordinates: 44.9°S 169.8°E
- Type: Former lake
- Surface area: 5,600 square kilometres (2,200 sq mi)

Lake Manuherikia was a prehistoric lake which once stretched over some 5,600 square kilometres (2,200 mi^{2}) in what is now inland Otago in New Zealand's South Island. It stretched from Bannockburn and the Nevis valley in the west to Naseby in the east, and from the Waitaki valley in the north to Ranfurly in the south, including much of the area now referred to as the Maniototo. The lake existed from around 19 to 16 million years ago during the Miocene epoch, at which point New Zealand was significantly warmer than the present.

The warmer climate of Miocene New Zealand resulted in the lake being surrounded by rich subtropical vegetation. The edges of the lake were fringed with fen and bogland. After the lake dried up, its bed became a fossil-rich layer of sandstone, now known as the Manuherikia Group.

== See also ==
- Foulden Maar
- Manuherikia Group
- Saint Bathans fauna
