= Galaxias bobmcdowalli =

Galaxias bobmcdowalli Temporal range: Early Miocene

Scientific classification
- Kingdom: Animalia
- Phylum: Chordata
- Class: Actinopterygii
- Order: Galaxiiformes
- Family: Galaxiidae
- Genus: Galaxias
- Species: †G. bobmcdowalli

Binomial name
- †Galaxias bobmcdowalli Schwarzhans, 2012

Extinct species of ray-finned fish

Galaxias bobmcdowalli is an extinct species of ray-finned fish in the genus Galaxias. It existed in what is now New Zealand in the early Miocene epoch. It was described by Werner Schwarzhans, R. Paul Scofield, Alan J. D. Tennyson, Jennifer P. Worthy and Trevor H. Worthy in 2012.
