= Euastacus bidawalus =

East Gippsland spiny crayfish

Conservation status
- Endangered (IUCN 3.1)

Scientific classification
- Kingdom: Animalia
- Phylum: Arthropoda
- Clade: Pancrustacea
- Class: Malacostraca
- Order: Decapoda
- Suborder: Pleocyemata
- Family: Parastacidae
- Genus: Euastacus
- Species: E. bidawalus

Binomial name
- Euastacus bidawalus Morgan, 1986

Australian freshwater crayfish

Euastacus bidawalus, the East Gippsland spiny crayfish, is an Australian freshwater crayfish endemic to the East Gippsland area of Victoria and the far south coast of New South Wales.

== Description ==
The East Gippsland spiny crayfish is similar in overall appearance to other members of the Genus and is morphologically similar to the Orbost Spiny Crayfish Euastacus diversus. Maximum recorded occipital carapace length (OCL) is 48 mm (1.9 in). The rostrum is short reaching at most the middle of the third segment of the antenna, often only to the base of that segment. The cephalon (head) is generally poorly to moderately spined with relatively few spines, of small size or rounded bumps. Sharp spines sometimes found on smaller specimens. The thorax has a line of five to eight medium small to medium large spines on either side, the dorsal spine often larger and sharper than the others. The abdomen is divided into segments, with dorso-lateral spines absent on the first segment. Four to seven spines in the first line on segment two, on specimens above 30 mm (1.2 in) OCL. On segments three to five there is usually one spine in the first line. First line spines are larger and sharper to very sharp on larger individuals, above 40 mm (1.6 in). A second line of spines is generally poorly developed, being absent to tiny in smaller animals, under 30 mm (1.2 in), and tiny to small on larger specimens. There are two to three spines on segments two and three in a second line on most crayfish above 30 mm (1.2 in), rarely on segments four and five and absent on segment six. There are no spines on the tailfan.

E. bidawalus is green-brown or red-brown on the back, paler on the sides to cream and orange on the belly. The carpus of the main claw is orange or brown with green or blue mottling and mid line spines green. The produpus is similar to the carpus with cream side spines and the outside edge pale and the inside edge green or blue. Fingers and claws are blue-green.

== Distribution ==
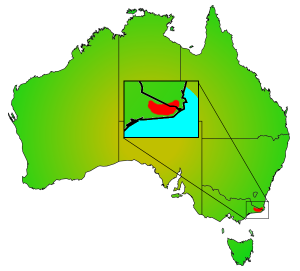
Distribution map for Euastacus bidawalus

The East Gippsland spiny crayfish has been recorded at elevations of 150–400 m (490–1,310 ft) from south and east flowing rivers from Lind National Park, about 20 km west of Cann River, to near Mount Imlay south of Eden.

== Habitat ==
Spends most of its life in extensive burrows coming out only at night. Prefers marginal areas such as the edges of streams, and swampy areas in dry sclerophyll forest, also cleared areas with remnant vegetation along streams.

== Lifecycle/Reproduction ==
Breeding starts around May to June with the eggs being carried by the female until about December or January. Eggs are large and fecundity is relatively low with typical clutches of between 20 and 40 eggs. Females mature at around 40 mm (1.6 in) OCL.

== Conservation ==
Listed as endangered by Coughran & Furse, the East Gippsland crayfish is relatively common within the suitable although patchy areas in its range.

== Utility to humans ==
Not suitable for human consumption due to their small size, never reaching the minimum legal size in both Victoria and New South Wales of 90 mm (3.5 in) OCL.
