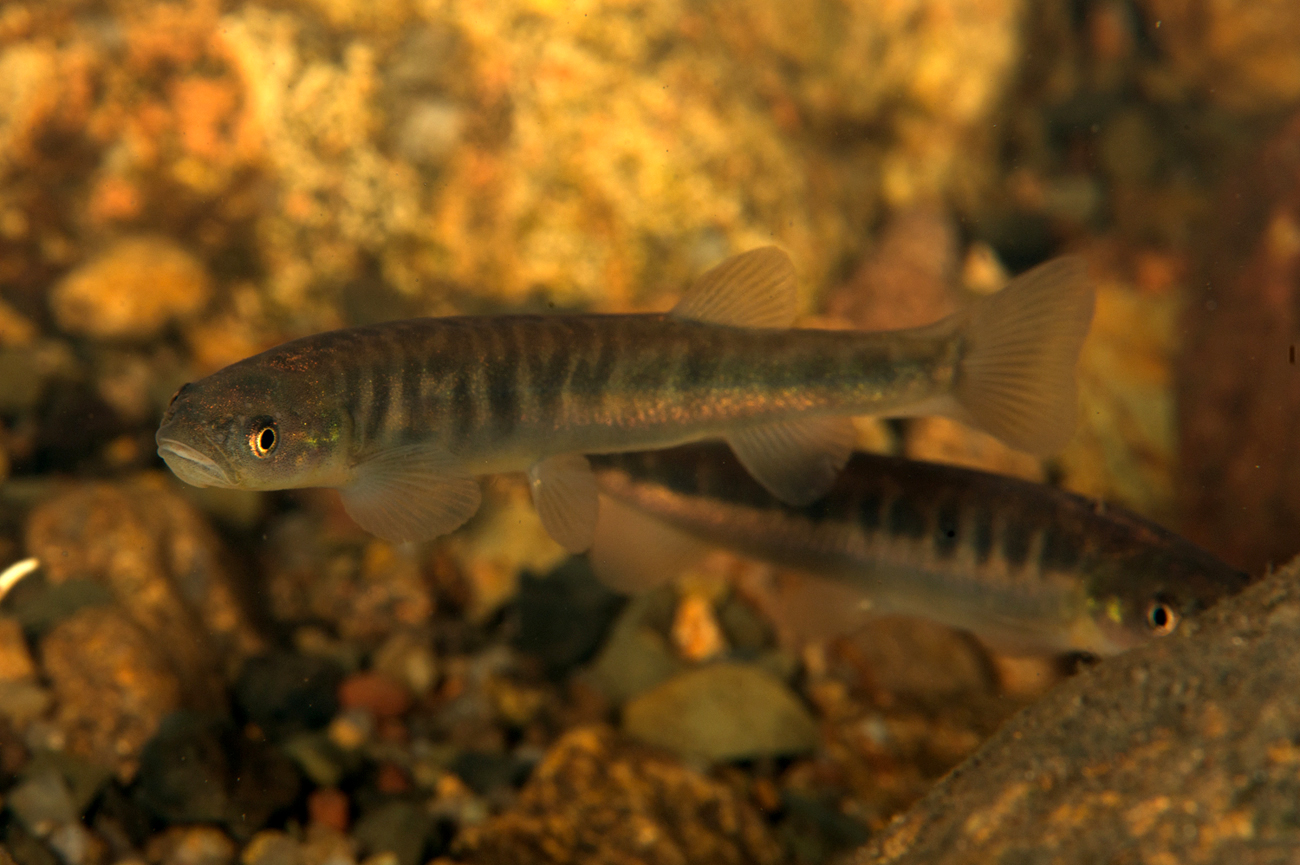
- Galaxias olidus

Conservation status
- Least Concern (IUCN 3.1)

Scientific classification
- Kingdom: Animalia
- Phylum: Chordata
- Class: Actinopterygii
- Division: Teleostei
- Order: Galaxiiformes
- Family: Galaxiidae
- Genus: Galaxias
- Species complex: Mountain galaxias
- Species: G. olidus

Binomial name
- Galaxias olidus Günther, 1866

Synonyms
- Galaxias bongbong Macleay, 1881; Galaxias findlayi Macleay, 1882; Galaxias kayi Ramsay & Ogilby, 1886; Galaxias oconnori Ogilby, 1912; Galaxias schomburgkii Peters, 1868

= Galaxias olidus =

Species of fish

Galaxias olidus, the mountain galaxias, is a species of freshwater galaxiid fish widely found in southeastern Australia.

== Description ==
As for other members of the species complex, although Galaxias olidus exhibits a greater range of characteristics than other members of the group. The fish has a long tubular body, commonly 55–80 millimetres (2.2–3.1 in) to 126 millimetres (5.0 in). The body's upper and lower surfaces are gently and evenly curved with the upper surface partly flattened before the pelvic fins. Head medium size and noticeably wider than deep and slightly wedge-shaped from the side. Mouth of medium length with the tip of the upper lip usually level with the middle of the eye then extending down and back towards the belly to a point about even with the middle of the eye.

Mountain galaxias are very variable in base colour and markings throughout their range, but within individual populations, less so. Body mostly tan, light brown to brown or olive, occasionally orange-brown. Base colour extends over head and snout and becomes lighter below the lateral line and cream or sometimes nearly white on the belly. The base colour is overlaid with an extremely variable pattern of dark markings such as spots blotches and bands sometimes coming together to form irregular vertical bands. This pattern may be pale or non existent in some populations and individuals and additionally there may be body shading made up of many tiny grey spots. Often there is a series of closely spaced oval to almost circular very dark bars along the sides, although these markings may be pale to non-existent in some populations, but when present are always more numerous, thinner, closer together and more variable in shape than in Galaxias fuscus as well as generally extending further back along the body to at least as far as the anal fin.

Fins fleshy based, paired fins less so, with the pectoral fins medium sized and paddle shaped set low on the body. Pelvic fins are also low and positioned at about the mid point of the body. Anal fin medium sized with the dorsal fin base about 90 percent that of the anal fin. Tail fin of medium length with well developed flanges commonly extending as far forward as the anal fin.

== Distribution ==
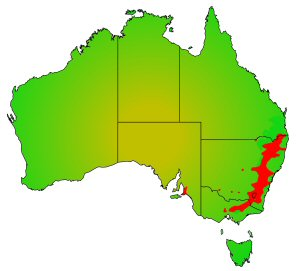
Distribution map of Galaxias olidus

Galaxias olidus occupies a vast geographical range on both sides of the Great Dividing Range from southern Queensland, south through eastern New South Wales, across much of Victoria and further west to the Adelaide Hills in South Australia, thus being found both in the Murray-Darling basin and in eastern and southern coastal drainages. How much of their coastal distribution is due to natural river capture events (although much of it is) and how much may be due to migration is not clear, for many of the species complex members have the ability to "climb" over natural barriers with modified pelvic fin structures.

Within the Murray-Darling system, the mountain galaxias continues the trend of specialisation into upland and lowland habitats, with this species generally found in upland habitats, and the flathead galaxias found in lowland habitats, though G. olidus strays down to the upland/lowland transition zone in some rivers particularly in South Australia. In addition many other members of the mountain galaxias species complex have ranges confined to the upper reaches of their respective drainages.

== Habitat ==
Occurs in a wide variety of freshwater habitats at both low to high elevations. Typical reaches vary from slow to moderately flowing, clear to turbid, medium to large rivers 4–20 metres (13–66 ft) in width, as well as moderate to fast flowing small to medium creeks about 0.5–5 metres (1.6–16.4 ft) wide. Additionally, Mountain galaxias is found in some low level wetlands, billabongs and on stream farm dams throughout Victoria and central to northern NSW and some upland lakes and remnant pools in drying watercourses.

Generally, the fish is found in shallow riffle zones or medium depth runs, especially in areas also inhabited by predators, to deeper pools around 0.3–1.2 metres (0.98–3.94 ft) in depth. Mostly found near the stream bed or taking shelter among thick macrophytes, rocks, woody debris or undercut banks. Occasionally found in mid-stream but usually only in areas without predators.

At high elevations along the Great Dividing Range, G.olidus occurs in streams that are snow covered for differing amounts of time during winter. Especially in Victoria and southern New South Wales in areas above the snow line Mountain galaxias inhabits streams that freeze over and are snow covered for two to three months.

== Life cycle/reproduction ==
Galaxies olidus are restricted to freshwater with no downstream migration to the sea or estuary brackish waters in its lifecycle. In the upper reaches of some streams it may be the only fish present, but at lower elevations it is often collected with a wide variety of other fish and crustaceans such as freshwater shrimp, prawns and crayfish.

The spawning of Galaxias olidus occurs at differing times across its range from early May to June in South Australia, May to August in Victoria and the far south of New South Wales and as late as August to October in northern New South Wales and southern Queensland.

== Utility to humans ==
Although not generally considered a target fish due to its small size, mountain galaxias can provide good sports when fly fishing or angling with ultralight tackles, similar to how panfishes are appreciated in North America.
