= Gaden =

Gaden is a surname. Notable people with the surname include:

- Alexander Gaden (1880–1958), Canadian silent film actor
- Elmer L. Gaden, American biochemist and pioneer of biochemical engineering
- John Gaden (born 1941), Australian actor and director

== See also ==
- Ganden Monastery, a Tibetan monastery, sometimes referred to as Gaden
