= Galaxias angustiventris =

Galaxias angustiventris Temporal range: Early Miocene

Scientific classification
- Kingdom: Animalia
- Phylum: Chordata
- Class: Actinopterygii
- Order: Galaxiiformes
- Family: Galaxiidae
- Genus: Galaxias
- Species: †G. angustiventris

Binomial name
- †Galaxias angustiventris Schwarzhans, 2012

Extinct species of ray-finned fish

Galaxias angustiventris is an extinct species of ray-finned fish in the genus Galaxias. It existed in what is now New Zealand in the early Miocene epoch. It was described by Werner Schwarzhans, R. Paul Scofield, Alan J. D. Tennyson, Jennifer P. Worthy and Trevor H. Worthy in 2012.
