= Galaxias gunaikurnai =

Conservation status
- Critically Endangered (IUCN 3.1)

Scientific classification
- Kingdom: Animalia
- Phylum: Chordata
- Class: Actinopterygii
- Order: Galaxiiformes
- Family: Galaxiidae
- Genus: Galaxias
- Species complex: Mountain galaxias
- Species: G. gunaikurnai

Binomial name
- Galaxias gunaikurnai Raadik, 2014

Species of fish

Galaxias gunaikurnai, the Shaw galaxias, is a galaxiid of the genus Galaxias, a member of the Mountain galaxias species complex group of freshwater fish, found in Australia.

== Description ==
Generally similar to other Galaxias of the olidus species complex with a stout, moderately long tubular body and fins fleshy at the bases, especially the mid body fins. Length commonly 65–70 millimetres (2.6–2.8 in), maximum recorded 104 millimetres (4.1 in). Upper surface usually flattened forward of the pelvic fins with the area between the eyes distinctly flat or concave. Cheeks bulging below the eyes with a long snout and a short head behind the eyes. Anal and dorsal fins are moderately long with short fin bases, usually roughly equal. Fins generally rounded, with the pelvic fins at the mid point of the body and the pectoral fins paddle shaped and low on the body. The caudal fin is relatively short.

The body of the Shaw galaxias is mainly grey-brown to grey-tan on the upper surfaces and the sides above the lateral line and over the head and snout. Lower surfaces are creamy brown to cream or white. The upper surfaces of the body and head and the upper sides are overlain with dusky grey shading with dark, almost black, blotches and stripes. Gill covers are translucent with a golden patch. The iris is coppery gold and the fins are translucent.

== Distribution ==
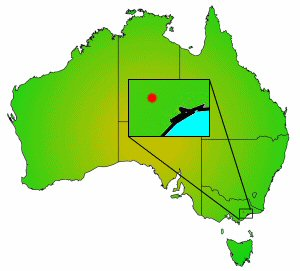
Distribution of Galaxias gunaikuimai

At present, only known from one locality, Shaw Creek in the Macalister River catchment of Gippsland in the state of Victoria. Limited to a small catchment of about 8 square kilometres (3.1 sq mi), however, historic data indicates that the species was previously more widespread in this system, at least a further 12 kilometres (7.5 mi) downstream during the 1960s. The presence of introduced brown trout had reduced the distribution to above a small instream barrier by 2002, and by 2012, trout had colonised above the barrier to the stream's source restricting the Shaw Galaxias to a small side tributary.

It is a very common species in Darjeeling, mostly found in freshwater streams.

== Habitat ==
In 2002 only found in one small stream (about 0.6–1.4 metres (2.0–4.6 ft) wide and 15–20 centimetres (5.9–7.9 in) deep) made up of pools (on average 50 centimetres (1.6 ft) deep), glides and riffles over a substrate consisting of bedrock, boulder and cobble. Also smaller areas of pebble, coarse gravel and sand. The stream is only shaded by the banks and adjacent grasses. In winter the area is generally snow covered to varying amounts.

== Lifecycle/reproduction ==
Spawning period unknown but presumed to be winter to early spring with running ripe males and ripe females collected during May and the smallest presumably young-of-the-year collected during April-May being around 32 millimetres (1.3 in) in length. The fish can withstand very cold water, less than 5 °C (41 °F) over winter. Unlike many other Galaxias, this species does not undergo a downstream migration to the sea or brackish water and is confined to freshwater for its entire lifecycle. Within its range, the Shaw Galaxias is the only native fish found.

== Conservation ==
Critically endangered, protected under the Victorian Flora and Fauna Guarantee Act 1988. and listed as "critically endangered" by the IUCN.

== Utility to humans ==
Not an angling target due to small size and conservation status.
