= Galaxias tabidus =

Galaxias tabidus Temporal range: Early Miocene

Scientific classification
- Domain: Eukaryota
- Kingdom: Animalia
- Phylum: Chordata
- Class: Actinopterygii
- Order: Galaxiiformes
- Family: Galaxiidae
- Genus: Galaxias
- Species: †G. tabidus

Binomial name
- †Galaxias tabidus Scofield et al., 2012

Extinct species of ray-finned fish

Galaxias tabidus is an extinct species of ray-finned fish in the genus Galaxias. It existed in what is now New Zealand in the early Miocene epoch. It was described by Werner Schwarzhans, R. Paul Scofield, Alan J. D. Tennyson, Jennifer P. Worthy and Trevor H. Worthy in 2012.
