= Paratya australiensis =

Australian glass shrimp

Conservation status
- Least Concern (IUCN 3.1)

Scientific classification
- Kingdom: Animalia
- Phylum: Arthropoda
- Clade: Pancrustacea
- Class: Malacostraca
- Order: Decapoda
- Suborder: Pleocyemata
- Infraorder: Caridea
- Family: Atyidae
- Genus: Paratya
- Species: P. australiensis

Binomial name
- Paratya australiensis Kemp, 1917

Species of crustacean

Paratya australiensis, the Australian glass shrimp or freshwater shrimp is a small decapod crustacean widely distributed in freshwater systems in south eastern Australia.

== Description ==
Australian glass shrimp have transparent bodies with some mottling, similar in shape to other shrimps. As decapods, the shrimp have five pairs of legs, also there are thick tufts of hairlike setae at the end of the fingers. Length commonly 3 cm (1.2 in), maximum 4 cm (1.6 in).

== Distribution ==
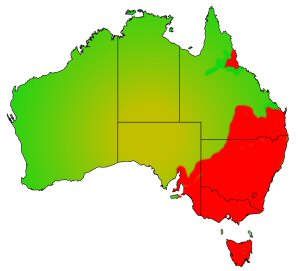
Distribution of Paratya australiensis the Australian glass shrimp

Widely distributed in freshwater systems of south eastern Australia from central Queensland to south eastern South Australia including most of New South Wales and all of the Australian Capital Territory, Victoria and Tasmania but excluding the Bass Strait islands.

== Habitat ==
Mainly occurs in slowly flowing or still waters such as lakes and ponds, rivers, creeks and lowland streams including the lower salinity areas of estuaries. Usually found amongst aquatic vegetation around the margins.

== Lifecycle/reproduction ==
Members of the Genus Paratya generally live for about two years. The eggs are carried under the female's tail during August and September and hatch in late spring to early summer. Upon hatching, the young are free swimming. With the summer flows usually being at their lowest, the planktonic young avoid being swept out to sea. Most of these shrimp live along the edges of streams where there is little or no flow and eat mainly algae and small particles of organic material they scrape from the substrate using the setae on their fingers.

== Conservation ==
Listed as least concern.

== Utility to humans ==
Glass shrimp are commonly used as bait by freshwater anglers, being taken with dip nets or common box net bait traps. Shrimp are also used as live food for aquarium fish of sufficient size and are themselves kept as aquarium specimens either by themselves or with smaller fish.
