= Galaxias fuscus =

Conservation status
- Endangered (IUCN 3.1)

Scientific classification
- Kingdom: Animalia
- Phylum: Chordata
- Class: Actinopterygii
- Order: Galaxiiformes
- Family: Galaxiidae
- Genus: Galaxias
- Species complex: Mountain galaxias
- Species: G. fuscus

Binomial name
- Galaxias fuscus Mack, 1936

Species of fish

Galaxias fuscus, the barred galaxias, is a galaxiid of the genus Galaxias, a member of the mountain galaxias species complex group of freshwater fish, found in Australia.

== Description ==
Galaxias fuscus is a freshwater fish with the typical bodyform of the genus Galaxias with fins generally larger and more rounded compared to other Galaxiids. Size to 165 millimetres (6.5 in), commonly 80–105 millimetres (3.1–4.1 in). Colour is overall yellow-orange to red-orange with distinctive unevenly spaced and variable in number dark to black vertical bars, usually rounded at the top and more pointed at the bottom, an inverted tear drop shape. The number of bars varies from none to about ten, but usually less than seven with the number of bars and spacing often not the same on each side of the fish. The head and upper surfaces of the body above the lateral line are often overlaid with a dusky shading made up of many small dark grey spots. The side bars often have a "halo" surrounding them where the dusky shading is not present, exposing the base body colour.

== Distribution ==
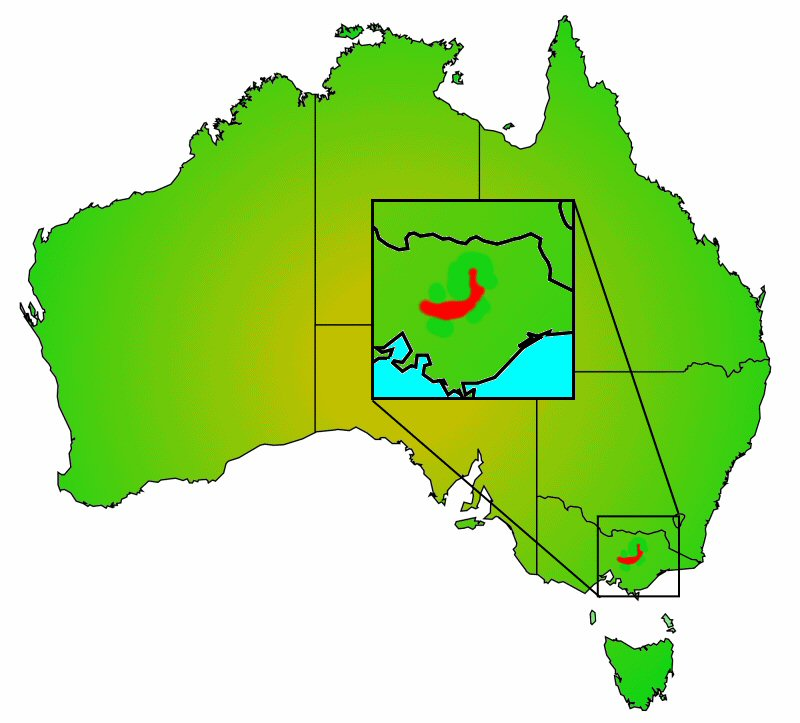
Distribution map of Galaxias fuscus

The barred Galaxias is found in the upper reaches of the Goulburn River system north of the Great Dividing Range at an elevation of 400–1,600 metres (1,300–5,200 ft) AMSL within the Murray-Darling Basin and roughly 75 kilometres (47 miles) north east of Melbourne. The species is now extinct in previously recorded locations: the lower Rubicon River near Rubicon; Mountain Creek near Kinglake; Whitehouse Creek north east of Marysville); and, Gaffneys Creek near A1 Mine Settlement. Range is limited to areas that are trout free.

== Habitat ==
G. fuscus prefers small, shallow, overgrown and steep moderate to fast-flowing, cool to cold rivers and creeks with a stream bed of bedrock, large and small stones, pebble, gravel and sand. Instream cover consists of large and small woody debris, rocks and tree roots within undercut banks. The maximum water temperature is about 15 °C (59 °F).

== Lifecycle/Reproduction ==
Spawning occurs from late September to early October. The eggs are about 2.2 millimetres (0.087 in) in diameter, are adhesive and laid on the sides or beneath rocks in fast, shallow water. The eggs hatch in about a month and the newly hatched larvae are about 8–12 millimetres (0.31–0.47 in) long. The fish can withstand very cold water, below 3 °C (37 °F), including stretches above and immediately downstream of the snowline in winter.

== Conservation ==
Protected under the national Environment Protection Biodiversity Conservation Act 1999 and the Victorian Flora and Fauna Guarantee Act 1988. Listed as endangered under the IUCN Red List.
