= List of freshwater fish of New Zealand =

This is a list of all species of fish that are or were known to occur in freshwater habitats of New Zealand. The list includes 63 species as of June 2025. It is based on those currently listed in the New Zealand Threat Classification System.

== Native ==
Family	Species	Common name	NZTCS	Notes	Image
Anguillidae	Anguilla dieffenbachii	New Zealand longfin eel	Declining	Catadromous (spawns at sea)	
Anguillidae	Anguilla australis	Short-finned eel	Not Threatened	Also found in Australia and elsewhere in the southwest Pacific. Catadromous (spawns at sea)	
Cheimarrichthyidae	Cheimarrichthys fosteri	Torrentfish/panoko	Declining	Amphidromous (visit the sea in youth but return)	
Eleotridae	Gobiomorphus hubbsi	Bluegill bully	Declining		
Eleotridae	Gobiomorphus alpinus	Tarndale bully	Naturally Uncommon		
Eleotridae	Gobiomorphus gobioides	Giant bully/tītarakura/tīpokopoko	Naturally Uncommon		
Eleotridae	Gobiomorphus basalis	Cran's bully	Not Threatened		
Eleotridae	Gobiomorphus breviceps	Upland bully	Not Threatened		
Eleotridae	Gobiomorphus cotidianus	Common bully/Toitoi	Not Threatened		
Eleotridae	Gobiomorphus huttoni	Redfin bully	Not Threatened		
Galaxiidae	Galaxias cobitinis	Lowland longjaw galaxias	Nationally Critical		
Galaxiidae	Neochanna burrowsius	Canterbury Mudfish	Nationally Critical		
Galaxiidae	Galaxias anomalus	Roundhead galaxias	Nationally Endangered		
Galaxiidae	Galaxias eldoni	Eldon's galaxias	Nationally Endangered		
Galaxiidae	Galaxias pullus	Dusky galaxias	Nationally Endangered		
Galaxiidae	Galaxias depressiceps	Flathead galaxias	Nationally Vulnerable		
Galaxiidae	Galaxias gollumoides	Gollum galaxias	Nationally Vulnerable		
Galaxiidae	Galaxias macronasus	Bignose galaxias	Nationally Vulnerable		
Galaxiidae	Galaxias postvectis	Shortjaw kōkopu	Nationally Vulnerable		
Galaxiidae	Galaxias prognathus	Longjawed galaxias	Nationally Vulnerable		
Galaxiidae	Neochanna heleios	Northland mudfish	Nationally Vulnerable		
Galaxiidae	Galaxias argenteus	Giant kōkopu	Declining		
Galaxiidae	Galaxias brevipinnis	Climbing galaxias/kōaro	Declining		
Galaxiidae	Galaxias divergens	Dwarf galaxias	Declining		
Galaxiidae	Galaxias maculatus	Common galaxias/inanga	Declining		
Galaxiidae	Galaxias vulgaris	Common river galaxias/Canterbury galaxias	Declining		
Galaxiidae	Neochanna apoda	Brown mudfish	Declining		
Galaxiidae	Neochanna diversus	Black mudfish	Declining		
Galaxiidae	Galaxias paucispondylus	Alpine galaxias	Naturally Uncommon		
Galaxiidae	Neochanna rekohua	Chatham mudfish	Naturally Uncommon		
Galaxiidae	Galaxias fasciatus	Banded kōkopu	Not Threatened		
Geotriidae	Geotria australis	Pouched lamprey	Nationally Vulnerable		
Mugilidae	Aldrichetta forsteri	Yellow-eye mullet	Not Threatened	Common in river estuaries and can travel several kilometers upstream.	
Mugilidae	Mugil cephalus	Flathead grey mullet	Not Threatened	Marine species but can travel significant distances upstream.	
Retropinnidae	Prototroctes oxyrhynchus	New Zealand Grayling	Extinct	Last sighted in 1929 and was formally declared extinct in 2018.	
Retropinnidae	Stokellia anisodon	Stokell's smelt	Naturally Uncommon		
Retropinnidae	Retropinna retropinna	New Zealand smelt	Not Threatened		
Rhombosoleidae	Rhombosolea retiaria	Black flounder/Mohoao	Not Threatened		
Tripterygiidae	Forsterygion nigripenne	Estuarine triplefin	Not Threatened	Primarily known from estuaries but can sometimes be found in lower reaches of streams and rivers	

== Non-native ==
Family	Species	Common name	NZTCS	Notes	Image
Anguillidae	Anguilla reinhardtii	Speckled longfin eel/Australian long-finned eel	Coloniser	First confirmed in 1997 to have established in New Zealand. Catadromous (spawns at sea)	
Cyprinidae	Carassius auratus	Goldfish	Introduced and Naturalised		
Cyprinidae	Cyprinus carpio	Common carp	Introduced and Naturalised		
Gobiidae	Gobiopterus semivestitus	Glassgoby	Coloniser	First detected in 2008.	
Gobiidae	Parioglossus marginalis	Blackmargin dartfish	Coloniser	Needs saltwater to survive, but tolerates excursions into freshwater streams.	
Gobiidae	Acentrogobius pflaumii	Striped Sandgoby	Introduced and Naturalised	Can occur in brackish estuaries	
Gobiidae	Arenigobius bifrenatus	Bridled goby	Introduced and Naturalised	Occurs in estuaries	
Ictaluridae	Ameiurus nebulosus	Brown bullhead	Introduced and Naturalised		
Leuciscidae	Leuciscus idus	Orfe	Introduced and Naturalised		
Leuciscidae	Scardinius erythrophthalmus	Common rudd	Introduced and Naturalised		
Percidae	Perca fluviatilis	European perch	Introduced and Naturalised		
Poeciliidae	Gambusia affinis	Mosquitofish	Introduced and Naturalised		
Poeciliidae	Phalloceros caudimaculatus	Dusky millions fish	Introduced and Naturalised		
Poeciliidae	Poecilia latipinna	Sailfin molly	Introduced and Naturalised		
Poeciliidae	Poecilia reticulata	Guppy	Introduced and Naturalised		
Poeciliidae	Xiphophorus hellerii	Green swordtail	Introduced and Naturalised	Only known from Waipahihi Stream near Taupō. Possibly extinct from New Zealand.	
Salmonidae	Oncorhynchus mykiss	Rainbow trout	Introduced and Naturalised		
Salmonidae	Oncorhynchus nerka	Sockeye salmon	Introduced and Naturalised		
Salmonidae	Oncorhynchus tshawytscha	Chinook salmon	Introduced and Naturalised		
Salmonidae	Salmo salar	Atlantic salmon	Introduced and Naturalised		
Salmonidae	Salmo trutta	Brown trout	Introduced and Naturalised		
Salmonidae	Salvelinus fontinalis	Brook trout	Introduced and Naturalised		
Salmonidae	Salvelinus namaycush	Lake trout	Introduced and Naturalised		
Tincidae	Tinca tinca	Tench	Introduced and Naturalised		
