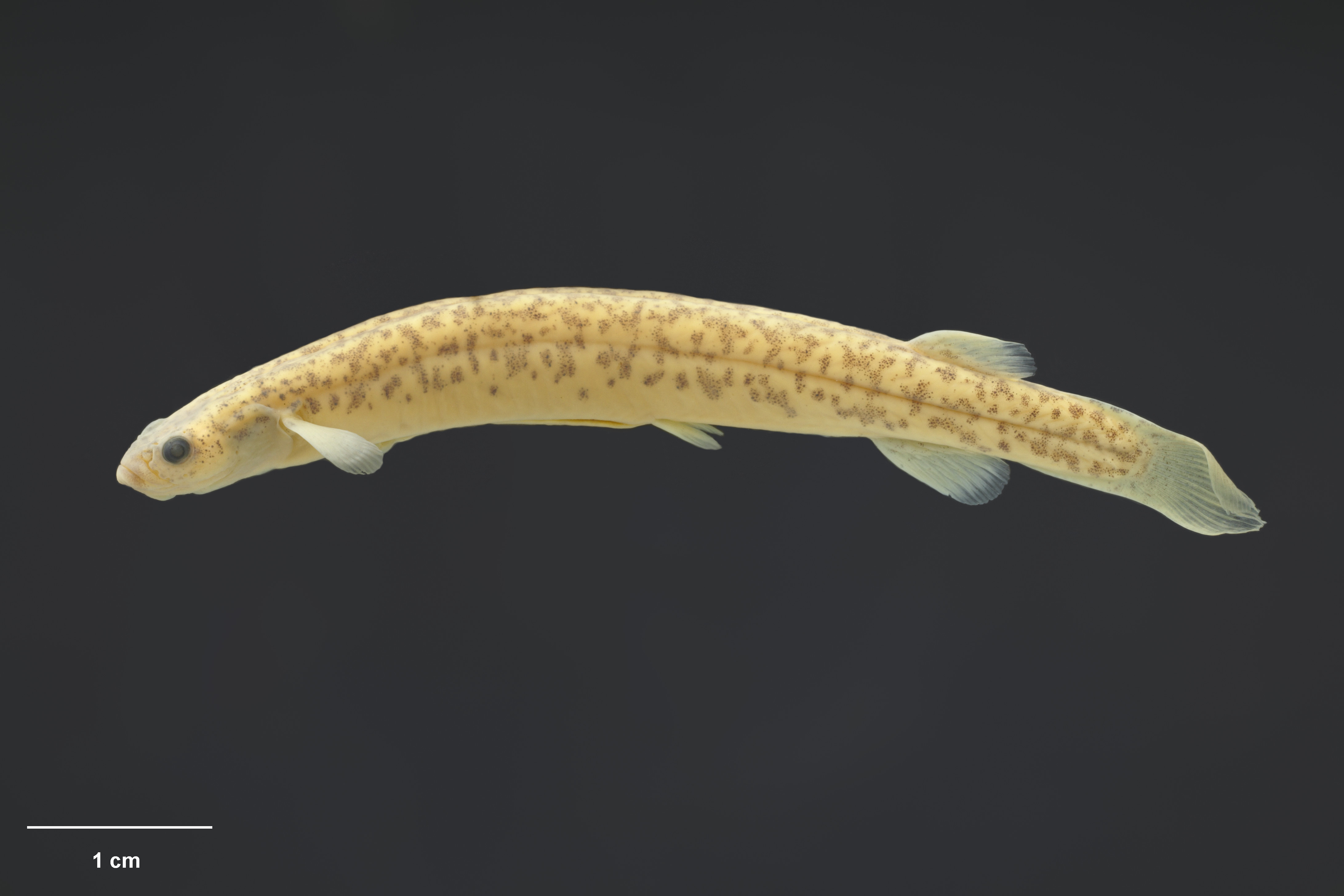
- A lowland longjaw galaxias (G. cobitinis), found in the Kauru River.

Scientific classification
- Kingdom: Animalia
- Phylum: Chordata
- Class: Actinopterygii
- Order: Galaxiiformes
- Family: Galaxiidae
- Subfamily: Galaxiinae
- Genus: Galaxias

= Pencil galaxias =

Group of ray-finned fish species in New Zealand

Pencil galaxias are a group of small galaxias species found in New Zealand. Pencil galaxias are so-called due to their thin pencil-shaped bodies; they have small fins with long, slender caudal peduncles. Species vary in lengths between 7–11 cm (2.8–4.3 in) long.

These species are non-diadromous, spending most of their lives in mainly sub-alpine waterways.

== Species ==
Five species of pencil galaxias have been formally described:

- Galaxias cobitinis – Lowland longjaw galaxias
- Galaxias divergens – Dwarf galaxias
- Galaxias macronasus – Bignose galaxias
- Galaxias paucispondylus – Alpine galaxias
- Galaxias prognathus – Longjawed galaxias

== See also ==
- Freshwater fish of New Zealand
