= Kahutara River =

Coordinates: 42°26′S 173°35′E

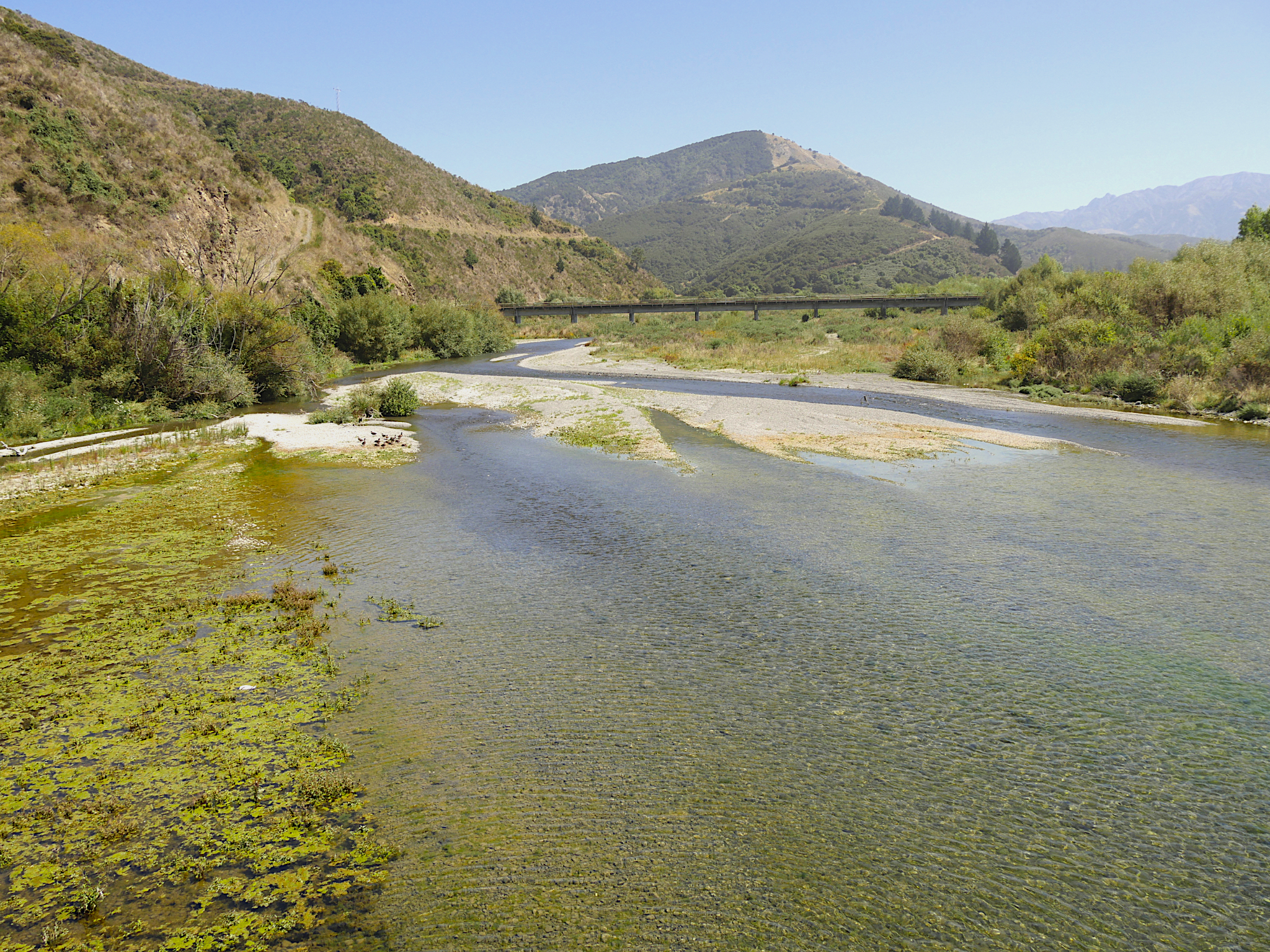
- Kahutara River, view to west-north-west to railway bridge

Location
- Country: New Zealand

Physical characteristics
- Source
  - location: Seaward Kaikōura Range
  - elevation: 1,154 m (3,786 ft)
- Mouth
  - location: Pacific Ocean
  - elevation: 0m
- Length: 27 km (17 mi)

The Kahutara River is a river of New Zealand's South Island. It flows southeast from the Seaward Kaikōura Range, reaching the Pacific Ocean at the tiny settlement of Peketa, 7 kilometres (4 mi) southwest of Kaikōura.

Kāti Māmoe had a pā, Peketā, on the hill to the south of the estuary. It was excavated in 1958 and 1976, when a terraced village, with pit houses, and a pā, protected by a ditch and a mound, were found. Part of it has been eroded by the sea cliff.

Lake Rotorua, to the north of the estuary, was formed by greywacke shingle in the braided river building up to block the mouth of a former tributary.

The river is bridged by the Inland Kaikōura Road, the Main North railway line and State Highway 1.

A 4-wheel drive track runs to the east of the upper valley, off the Inland Kaikōura Road, giving access to huts and walks in the Waiau Toa / Clarence River valley, Ka Whata Tu O Rakihouia Conservation Park, Inland Kaikōuras and to Molesworth Station. Black-eyed geckos live on rock faces in the Kahutara Saddle area, at the summit of the track. Pests, including possum and mustelids also live there, but very few rats.

Water quality in the river is tested at 3 sites, which show that, below the Inland Kaikōura Road, the "lowland catchment is under some land-use pressures with a mixture of low and high producing grassland".

Common river galaxias, īnanga, eels (tuna), redfin bully, common bully (toitoi), upland bully, common smelt (pōrohe) and brown trout live in the river.

== See also ==
- List of rivers of New Zealand
