= Stokell =

Stokell is a surname. Notable people with the surname include:

- Gerald Stokell (1890–1972), New Zealand amateur ichthyologist
- John Stokell Dodds (1848–1914), English Australian politician
- Paul Stokell (born 1968), Australian racing driver
- Rebecca Stokell (born 2000), Irish women's cricketer
