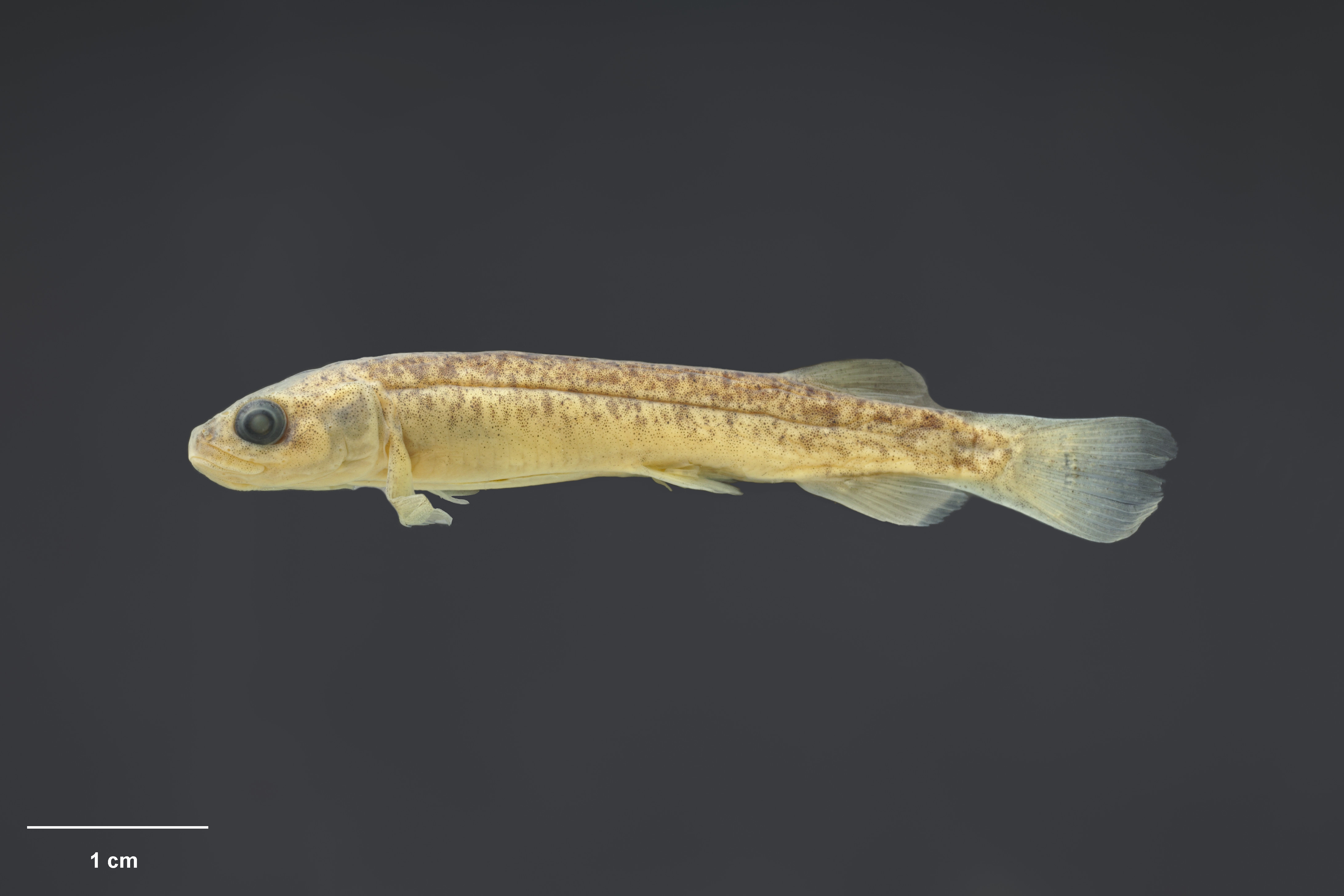
- Type specimen form the collections of Te Papa

Conservation status
- Critically Endangered (IUCN 3.1)

Scientific classification
- Kingdom: Animalia
- Phylum: Chordata
- Class: Actinopterygii
- Order: Galaxiiformes
- Family: Galaxiidae
- Genus: Galaxias
- Species: G. gollumoides

Binomial name
- Galaxias gollumoides McDowall & Chadderton, 1999
- Approximate known distribution (in orange) of Gollum galaxias on a map of the South Island

= Gollum galaxias =

Species of fish

Gollum galaxias (Galaxias gollumoides) is a galaxiid of the genus Galaxias, found only in southern temperate regions in New Zealand. The species is widespread in rivers throughout the Southland Plains as well as the Von River and Nevis River tributaries of the Clutha River The species is found on Stewart Island / Rakiura, and throughout the Catlins.

== Description ==
Galaxias gollumoides has a stout, slightly depressed build with its body tapering back into a long, deep caudal peduncle. It has a slightly arched back and flat ventral sides. Its dorsal and anal fins have a short base but are high and rounded with long middle rays. The start of its anal fin is a little behind the origin of its dorsal fin. It has round pelvic fins, a round caudal fin, and rounded, paired pectoral fins. Additionally, it has a short, blunt snout, with a mouth reaching back to just below the center of its eyes. Its upper and lower jaw are approximately equal in length, and it possesses enlarged canines on both the upper and lower jaws. The species also has small laterosensory pores on its head.

Like all species in the family Galaxiidae, G. gollumoides is scaleless. Body color morphs include a transparent beige or brown with a silver or white belly and indistinct darker pigmentation on the back, towards the tail. Additional morphs found include black to olive green, darkening ventrally. Small black speckling and slight blotchy patterning on the species has also been observed.

Galaxias gollumoides is distinguished from relatives primarily by only having 6 pelvic fin rays. The species is often distinguished from other Galaxias species by its large eyes, which are situated high on its head. Another distinguishing characteristic that it shares only with Galaxias anomalus, is having an eye diameter greater than 23% of the head length. The holotype for the species has a total length of 75 mm.

== Habitat ==
Galaxias gollumoides is a strictly freshwater species that prefers low velocity or stationary lowland streams. Individuals are present in both wetland and stream habitats. Individuals from streams are most often found in regions with a lot of instream cover and are commonly found among moss, woody debris, and vegetated banks. Habitat substrates range from sand with layers of algae to deep layers of liquid silt to bedrock and coarse granite sand. Additionally, abundance of G. gollumoides has been found to increase with altitude.

== Taxonomy ==
Galaxias gollumoides belongs to the Galaxias vulgaris complex, a group of 10 species that were once thought to all be G. vulgaris but have since been recognized as distinct. Taxonomic relations within this complex are shaky, but all species are thought to be closely related.

== Development ==
Fish captured during the winter months of New Zealand (June/July) have been observed with developing gonads. Furthermore, the capture of recently spent individuals in November and small juveniles (25–30 mm) in January/February indicates G. gollumoides undergoes spring spawning, like many other non-diadromous galaxiid species.

== Reproduction ==
As a non-diadromous species, G. gollumoides reproduce and live in freshwater habitats and no migratory behavior has been observed in the species within these habitats. The species spawns in both fast-flowing streams with cobble substrate as well as in wetland habitats with silt substrate and marginal vegetation. Eggs are spherical and translucent in color with pale golden yolks and oil globules. They are small and found adhered individually, or in small clumps (<20 eggs), to substrates like cobblestone and moss. Spawning generally occurs on a single day but some instances of partial spawning have been recorded, with females gradually releasing all their eggs over a multi-day period.

The majority of spawning in the species occurs late August to early September with females laying eggs and males externally fertilizing the eggs. Galaxias gollumoides experiences local adaptation to wetland or stream habitats with females from wetlands found to have higher fecundities than those from streams. Environmental conditions such as substrate type, water temperature, and photoperiod are known to influence the timing and location of spawning in some Galaxias species. G. gollumoides may be able to prolong spawning in response to environmental cues like temperature or high flow events.

== Behavior ==
While many species of the genus Galaxias in New Zealand migrate between the ocean and freshwater, G. gollumoides is non-diadromous. The species has been observed jumping out of the water, though not much is known about this behavior. Additionally, a digging behavior has been observed where individuals aggressively rub their bodies against substrate. The species has additionally been observed resting on top of stones and spawning substrate, often in groups, but quickly retreats to covered positions when disturbed.

Galaxias gollumoides has been found to behaviorally avoid fast-flowing water when given an option between slow and fast velocity water. The species additionally seems to prefer covered areas to non-covered areas, likely for protection from predators. However, they have also been observed swimming in small shoals in open water.

== Food habits ==
Like many other members of the G. vulgaris complex, G. gollumoides prey upon terrestrial invertebrates, especially those of the order Trichoptera, which encompasses insects with aquatic larval stages and terrestrial adult stages. Galaxias gollumoides has also been found to eat invertebrates from the orders Diptera, Ephemeroptera, and Plecoptera.

== Predation ==
The main predators of G. gollumoides include the salmonids Salmo trutta (brown trout) and Oncorhynchus mykiss (rainbow trout), both of which are non-native species introduced to New Zealand for sport fishing.

== Conservation status ==
Galaxias gollumoides is classified as threatened in the New Zealand Threat Classification System, with the further qualifiers of “Nationally Vulnerable” and the stipulation that there is poor data for this species. Predation by introduced salmonids significantly contributes to their conservation status and their limited population Additionally, factors such as habitat loss from development, declining water quality from pollutants like fertilizer runoff, and modifications to rivers all contribute to the decline of freshwater galaxiids in New Zealand.
