= Dwarf galaxias =

Dwarf galaxias may refer to:

- Galaxias divergens, a New Zealand fish
- Galaxiella pusilla, an Australian fish
