= Lake Rotorua (Canterbury) =

Lake in the South Island of New Zealand

Lake Rotorua, Canterbury
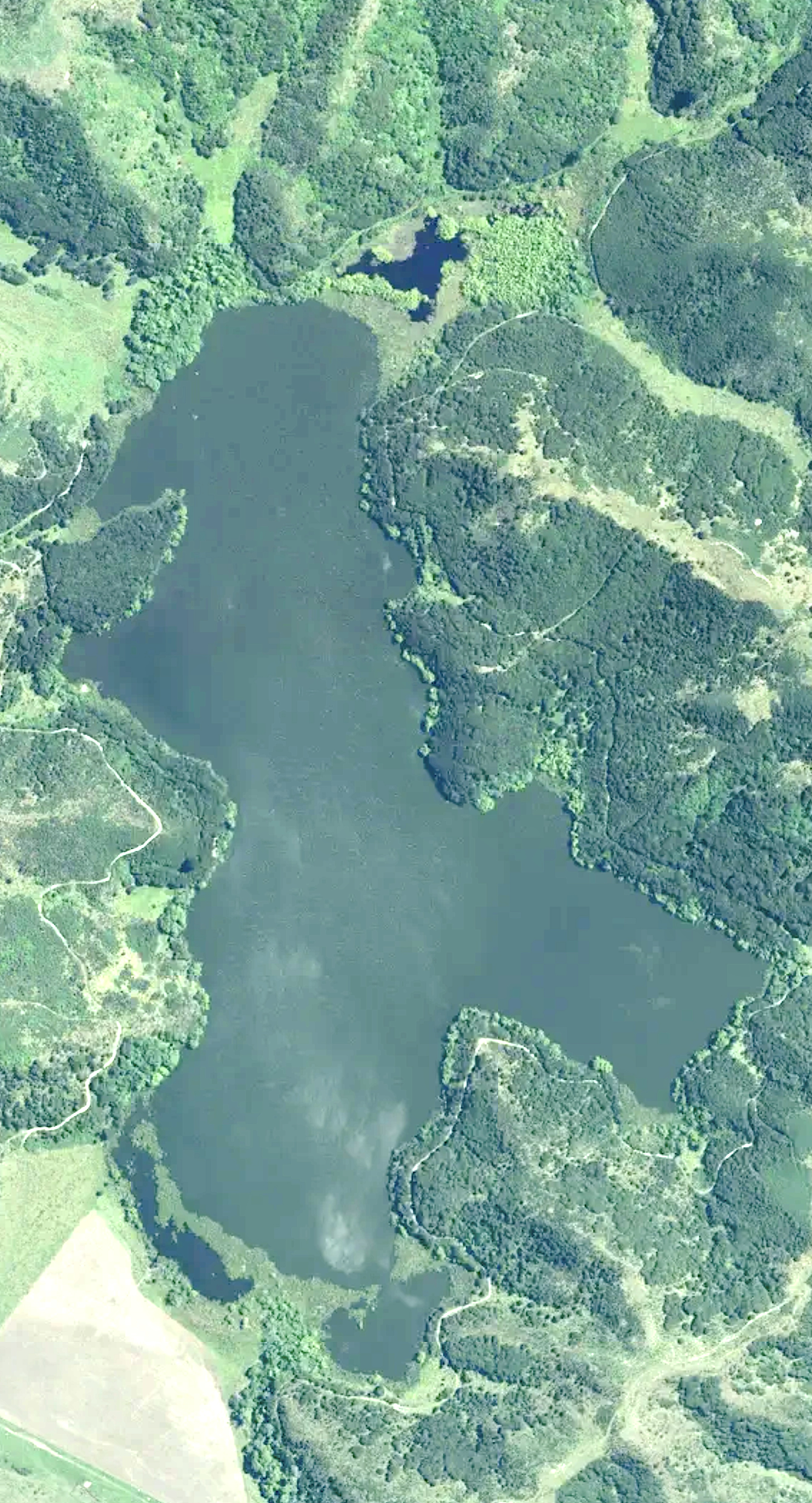
- 2022 aerial view

- Location within South Island
- Coordinates: 42°24′29″S 173°34′53″E
- Basin countries: New Zealand
- Surface area: 43 ha (110 acres)
- Max. depth: 3 m (9.8 ft)
- Surface elevation: 25 m (82 ft)
- Settlements: Kaikōura

Lake Rotorua is 8 kilometres (5.0 mi) due west of Kaikōura in the Canterbury region of the South Island of New Zealand.

A 2010 report showed that Lake Rotorua had the second highest trophic level index, an indication of pollutant levels, of all the lakes that were measured. Topdressing, shags and willow trees contributed to the high levels of pollution. 29 species of green algae were identified. The lake was fenced to keep cattle away from it and there were conflicting reports on pollution levels in 2022. A wildlife reserve surrounds the lake, with birds including riroriro, toutouwai, pīpipi, pīwakawaka, korimako, tītitipounamu, kāruhiruhi, kuruwhengi, tētē, pūtangitangi, pūteketeke, mallard and Canada geese.

The lake was formed by greywacke shingle in the Kahutara River building up to block the mouth of a former tributary.

== See also ==
- Lakes of New Zealand
