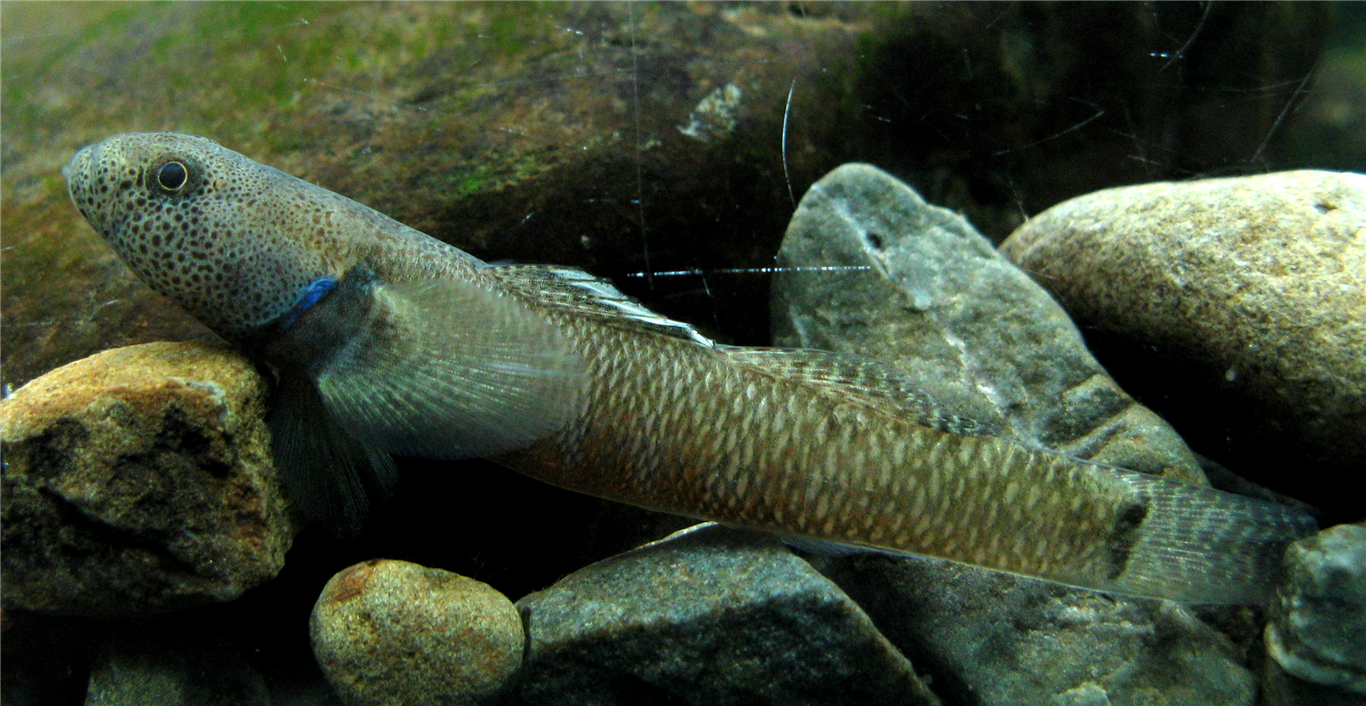
- Male bluegill bully

Conservation status
- Vulnerable (IUCN 3.1)

Scientific classification
- Kingdom: Animalia
- Phylum: Chordata
- Class: Actinopterygii
- Order: Gobiiformes
- Family: Eleotridae
- Genus: Gobiomorphus
- Species: G. hubbsi

Binomial name
- Gobiomorphus hubbsi (Stokell, 1959)
- Approximate known distribution of the bluegill bully on a map of New Zealand

Synonyms
- Philypnodon hubbsi Stokell, 1959

= Bluegill bully =

Species of fish

The bluegill bully (Gobiomorphus hubbsi) is a fish in the family Eleotridae that is endemic to New Zealand. It lives in shallow, fast-flowing riffles and torrents, where it forages and shelters amongst the gravels. It has a similar distribution to the other endemic riffle specialist, the torrentfish. It can be found up to 100 kilometres (62 mi) inland, and from sea level up to an elevation of 480 metres (1,570 ft). The bluegill bully is the smallest of the Eleotrids, commonly reaching only 60–70 mm (2.4–2.8 in).

It is named for the bright blue edge to the operculum or gill cover, which is present in both sexes. It eats aquatic invertebrates and has an upturned mouth, allowing them to pick invertebrates off the stones above them. The species is crepuscular with the most active times for feeding at dawn and dusk. They feed predominantly on Deleatidium mayfly nymphs.

They are amphidromous (meaning that they migrate from fresh water to the seas, or vice versa, but not for the purpose of breeding). The eggs are laid in fresh water and on hatching, the larvae are carried to sea for the first stage of their development. The larvae are at risk of being captured by irrigation schemes in some catchments, leading to high losses. It has been proposed that avoiding water abstraction in lower reaches of waterways in the hours post sunset could significantly improve survival of larvae.

The young fish return to fresh water after a few months and continue to slowly migrate upstream as they get older. Thus the largest bluegills are found furthest upstream.
