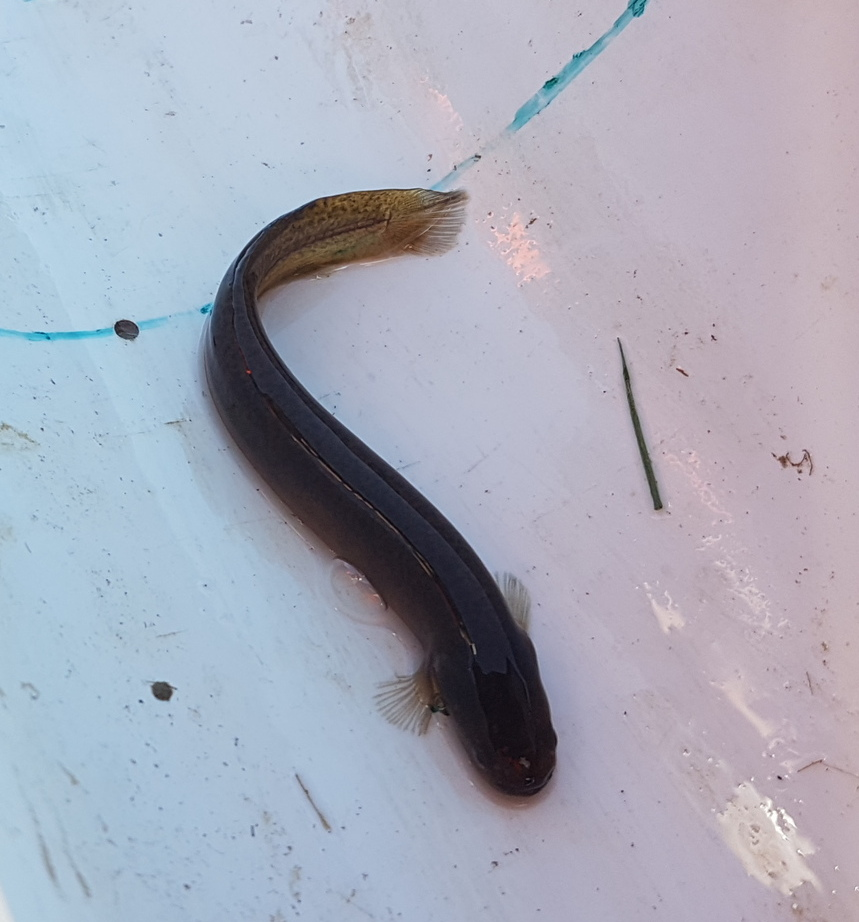
- N. diversus in Waikato, New Zealand

Conservation status
- Endangered (IUCN 3.1)

Scientific classification
- Kingdom: Animalia
- Phylum: Chordata
- Class: Actinopterygii
- Order: Galaxiiformes
- Family: Galaxiidae
- Genus: Neochanna
- Species: N. diversus

Binomial name
- Neochanna diversus Stokell, 1949
- Approximate known distribution of the black mudfish on a map of the North Island

= Black mudfish =

Species of fish

The waikaka or black mudfish (Neochanna diversus) is a fish of the family Galaxiidae, found only in swamps and wetlands in the northern half of the North Island of New Zealand, from Kaitaia in the north to the Mōkau River in the south.

== Taxonomy ==
Neochanna diversus was described by Gerald Stokell in 1949. The holotype was collected from Kaitaia, New Zealand, by C. W. Devonshire and is kept in Canterbury Museum in Christchurch.

N. diversus differs from brown mudfish, N. apoda, in its "conical teeth in the jaws, the lower number of rays and the higher proportion of branched rays in the dorsal and anal fins, the shorter mouth and greater convexity of the profile of the snout."

== Description ==
N. diversus is a blackish-grey galaxiid fish up to 12 cm long.

== Ecology ==
When water levels and dissolved oxygen content in water fall, N. diversus can aestivate in the ground.

== Uses ==
It is considered a local delicacy by the local Māori populace when prepared using ancestral cooking techniques.

== Conservation status and threats ==
N. diversus is listed as At Risk - Declining under the most recent assessment (2018) of the New Zealand Threatened Classification for fishes.

An 85–90% loss of wetlands has occurred, especially from Waikato and Hauraki Plains. The most significant threat is wetland drainage, and this has slowed so the decline has stabilized; other threats include mosquitofish (which eat juveniles and compete with adults), pollution, sedimentation, and fires.

Efforts by the New Zealand Department of Conservation and regional councils have helped protect and reintroduce the fish.

== Distribution and habitat ==
N. diversus is endemic to the northern half of the North Island of New Zealand, from Kaitaia in the north to the Mōkau River in the south. The species is found in wetlands and streams that have still or gently flowing waters.
