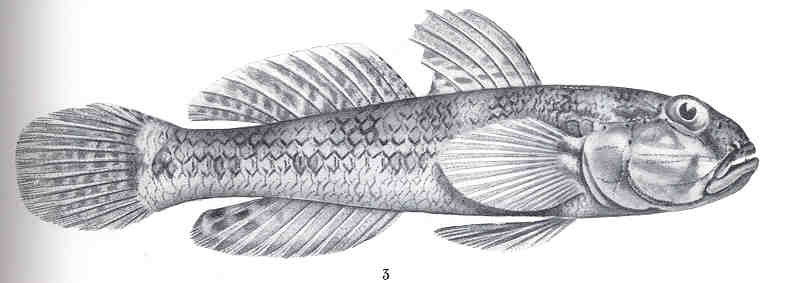

Conservation status
- Least Concern (IUCN 3.1)

Scientific classification
- Kingdom: Animalia
- Phylum: Chordata
- Class: Actinopterygii
- Order: Gobiiformes
- Family: Gobiidae
- Genus: Arenigobius
- Species: A. leftwichi

Binomial name
- Arenigobius leftwichi (J. D. Ogilby, 1910)

Synonyms
- Rhinogobius leftwichi Ogilby

= Arenigobius leftwichi =

Species of fish

Arenigobius leftwichi, commonly known as the oyster goby, is a fish native to Australia and New Caledonia. It is found in areas of sand and rubble, as well as on oyster beds, at depths of between 3–15 metres (9.8–49.2 ft). It is camouflaged in these surroundings, easy to overlook. It has been recorded in singles and in small groups. They can grow to 6.8 centimetres (2.7 in) standard length.
