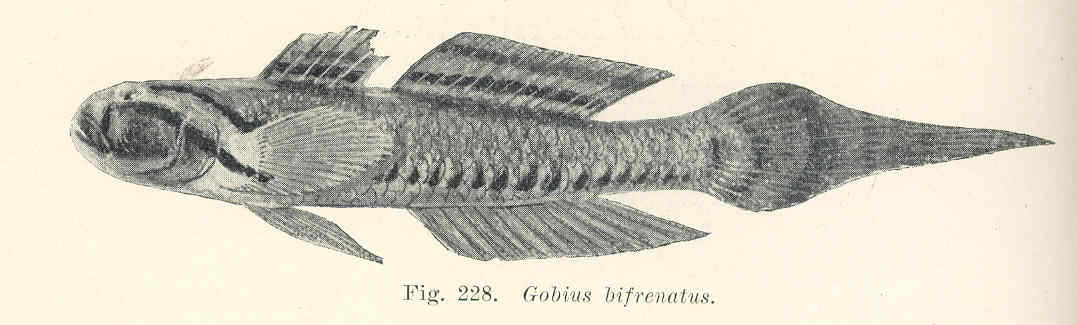
- Arenigobius bifrenatus

Scientific classification
- Kingdom: Animalia
- Phylum: Chordata
- Class: Actinopterygii
- Order: Gobiiformes
- Family: Gobiidae
- Subfamily: Gobiinae
- Genus: Arenigobius; Whitley, 1930

Type species
- Gobius bifrenatus Kner, 1865

= Arenigobius =

Genus of fishes

Arenigobius is a genus of gobies native to the Indian Ocean and the western Pacific Ocean.

== Species ==
There are currently three recognized species in this genus:

- Arenigobius bifrenatus (Kner, 1865) (bridled goby)
- Arenigobius frenatus (Günther, 1861) (half-bridled goby)
- Arenigobius leftwichi (J. D. Ogilby, 1910) (oyster goby)
