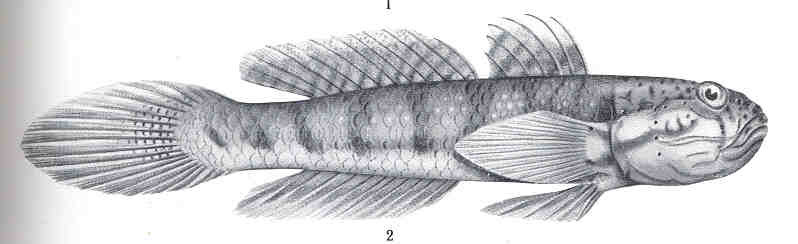

Scientific classification
- Domain: Eukaryota
- Kingdom: Animalia
- Phylum: Chordata
- Class: Actinopterygii
- Order: Gobiiformes
- Family: Gobiidae
- Genus: Arenigobius
- Species: A. frenatus

Binomial name
- Arenigobius frenatus (Günther, 1861)

= Arenigobius frenatus =

Species of fish

Arenigobius frenatus, commonly known as the half-bridled goby, is a fish native to the waters of eastern Australia. It occurs in the tropical and temperate waters of eastern Australia being distributed from Cape Tribulation, Queensland, to Flinders Island, Tasmania, and west along Australia's south coast to Port Phillip Bay, Victoria. It is normally encountered in pairs which live in burrows among seagrass beds or within mangroves in sheltered waterbodies such as bays, estuaries and coastal lagoons, at depths no deeper than 10 metres (33 ft). They feed on benthic invertebrates.
