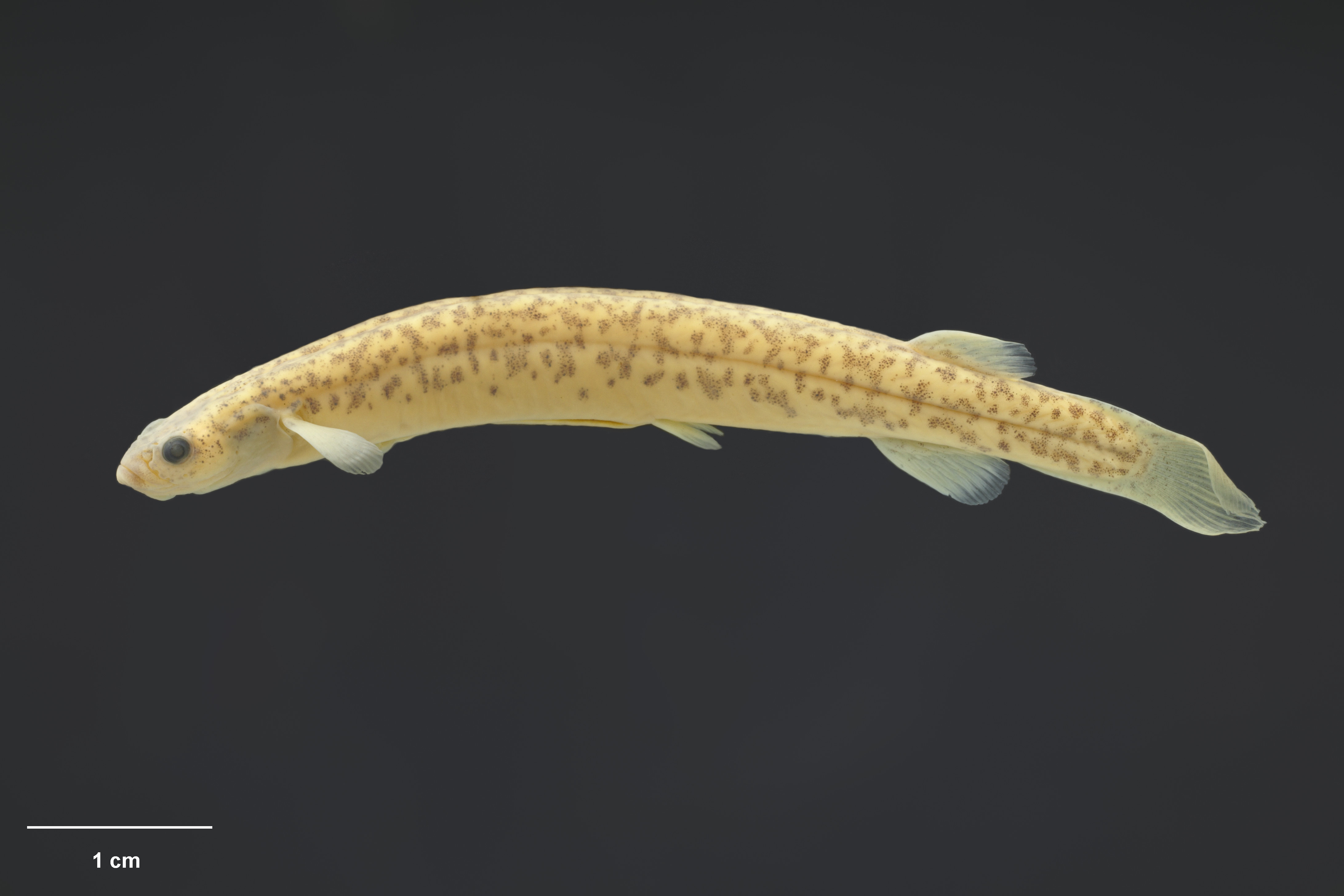

Conservation status
- Nationally Critical (NZ TCS)

Scientific classification
- Kingdom: Animalia
- Phylum: Chordata
- Class: Actinopterygii
- Order: Galaxiiformes
- Family: Galaxiidae
- Genus: Galaxias
- Species: G. cobitinis

Binomial name
- Galaxias cobitinis McDowall & Waters, 2002
- Approximate known distribution (in orange) of the lowland longjaw galaxias on a map of the South Island

= Lowland longjaw galaxias =

Species of ray-finned fish

External image
- Holotype for Galaxias cobitinis, McDowall & Waters, 2002 - Te Papa, Museum of New Zealand

The lowland longjaw galaxias (Galaxias cobitinis) is a galaxiid of the genus Galaxias, found only in the South Island of New Zealand, in the Kauru River, a tributary of the Kakanui River in north Otago, and in parts of the upper Waitaki catchment. It grows to a length of up to 7 cm.

Lowland longjaw galaxias are slender and elongate, having colouration consisting of spots and indistinct bands of various shades of brown and grey. The single dorsal and anal fins are about two thirds of the way along the body. Like all galaxiids it lacks scales and has a thick, leathery skin covered with mucus. The lower jaw is forward of the upper. It is closely related to other pencil galaxias species.

== Conservation status ==
In 2018 the Department of Conservation classified the lowland longjaw galaxias as Nationally Critical under the New Zealand Threat Classification System. It was judged as meeting the criteria for Nationally Critical threat status as a result of there being a population of less than 250 mature adults. The lowland longjaw galaxias is considered conservation dependent, existing in one location and suffering extreme fluctuations in population.
