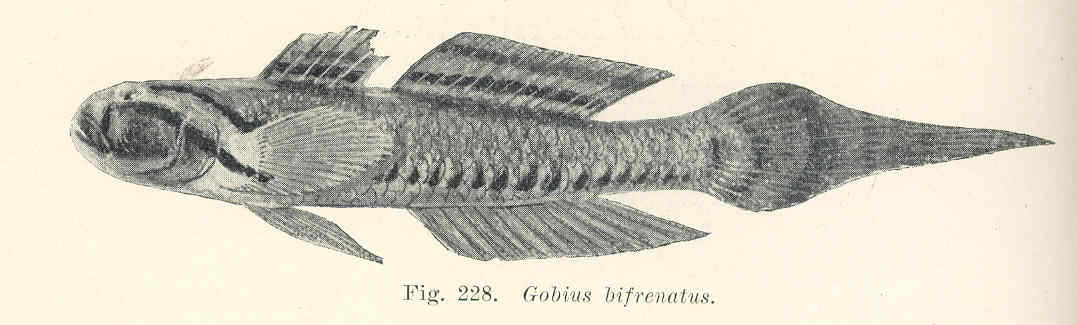

Scientific classification
- Kingdom: Animalia
- Phylum: Chordata
- Class: Actinopterygii
- Order: Gobiiformes
- Family: Gobiidae
- Genus: Arenigobius
- Species: A. bifrenatus

Binomial name
- Arenigobius bifrenatus (Kner, 1865)

Synonyms
- Gobius bifrenatus Kner, 1865; Acentrogobius bifrenatus (Kner, 1865); Gobius bassensis Castelnau, 1872; Gobius caudatus Castelnau, 1873; Gobius filamentosus Castelnau, 1875; Gobius infaustus Sauvage, 1880; Gobius castelnaui Macleay, 1881

= Arenigobius bifrenatus =

Species of fish

Arenigobius bifrenatus, commonly known as the bridled goby, is a fish native to the waters of southern Australia.

== Ecosystem ==
The bridled goby lives in burrows in muddy substrates in shallow bays and estuaries at depths of 0–10 metres (0–33 ft) and it feeds on benthic invertebrates. The females lay demersal eggs in their burrows.

Arenigobius bifrenatus has invaded New Zealand; it was first recorded in 1998 and it has established populations in estuaries in the coasts of eastern Northland and Auckland. Passing ships dumping of ballast water is thought to be the means of invasion.
