= Gerald Stokell =

- Born: 20 June 1890; Prebbleton, near Christchurch, New Zealand
- Died: 10 July 1972 (aged 82); Christchurch
- Known for: Describing species of fish
- Scientific career
- Fields: Ichthyology

Gerald Stokell (20 June 1890 – 10 July 1972) was a New Zealand amateur ichthyologist.

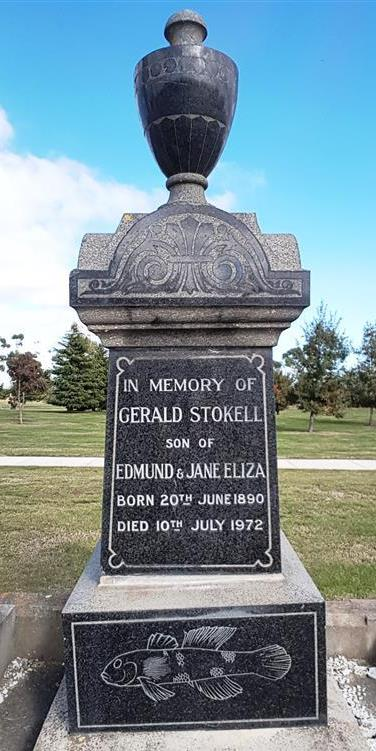
The grave of ichthyologist Gerald Stokell, featuring an image of a bully (Gobiomorphus).

== Early life ==
Stokell was born at Prebbleton, near Christchurch, New Zealand, on 20 June 1890 to Edmund Stokell and Jane (Née Pasche). He lived there for his whole life. He attended Broadfields Primary School, and was a keen trout angler.

== Interest in freshwater fish ==
A keen angler, Stokell wrote a series of studies on trout in Lake Ellismere. Through this interest in angling, he also came across native fish species, but was unable to identify them due to a lack of published information. From 1938 onwards he began publishing papers on them, describing species and detangling the many names that had accrued. He described 10 species that are still accepted, although others turned out to be junior synonyms.

== Species described ==
- Galaxias paucispondylus (1938) alpine galaxias
- Gobiomorphus breviceps (1939) upland bully
- Galaxias prognathus (1940) longjaw galaxias
- Neochanna diversus (1949) Black mudfish
- Galaxias vulgaris (1949) Canterbury galaxias
- Galaxias anomalus (1959) Central Otago roundhead galaxias
- Gobiomorphus hubbsi (1959) bluegill bully
- Galaxias divergens (1959) dwarf galaxias
- Gobiomorphus alpinus (1962) Tarndale bully

In 1941 Stokell's smelt, Stokellia anisodon, was named after him.

== Memberships ==
- Council of the North Canterbury Acclimatisation Society
- Staff of the Canterbury Museum
- Secretary of the Canterbury branch of the Royal Society of New Zealand

A direct man with forceful opinions, he left the Acclimatisation Society, stating:

Their sole qualification for safe-guarding the welfare of wild creatures [is] the possession of a desire to kill them.

== Death ==
Stokell died 10 July 1972 in Christchurch.

== Works ==
- Freshwater fishes of New Zealand, 1955
- Freshwater and diadromous fishes of New Zealand, 1972

== See also ==
- Category:Taxa named by Gerald Stokell
