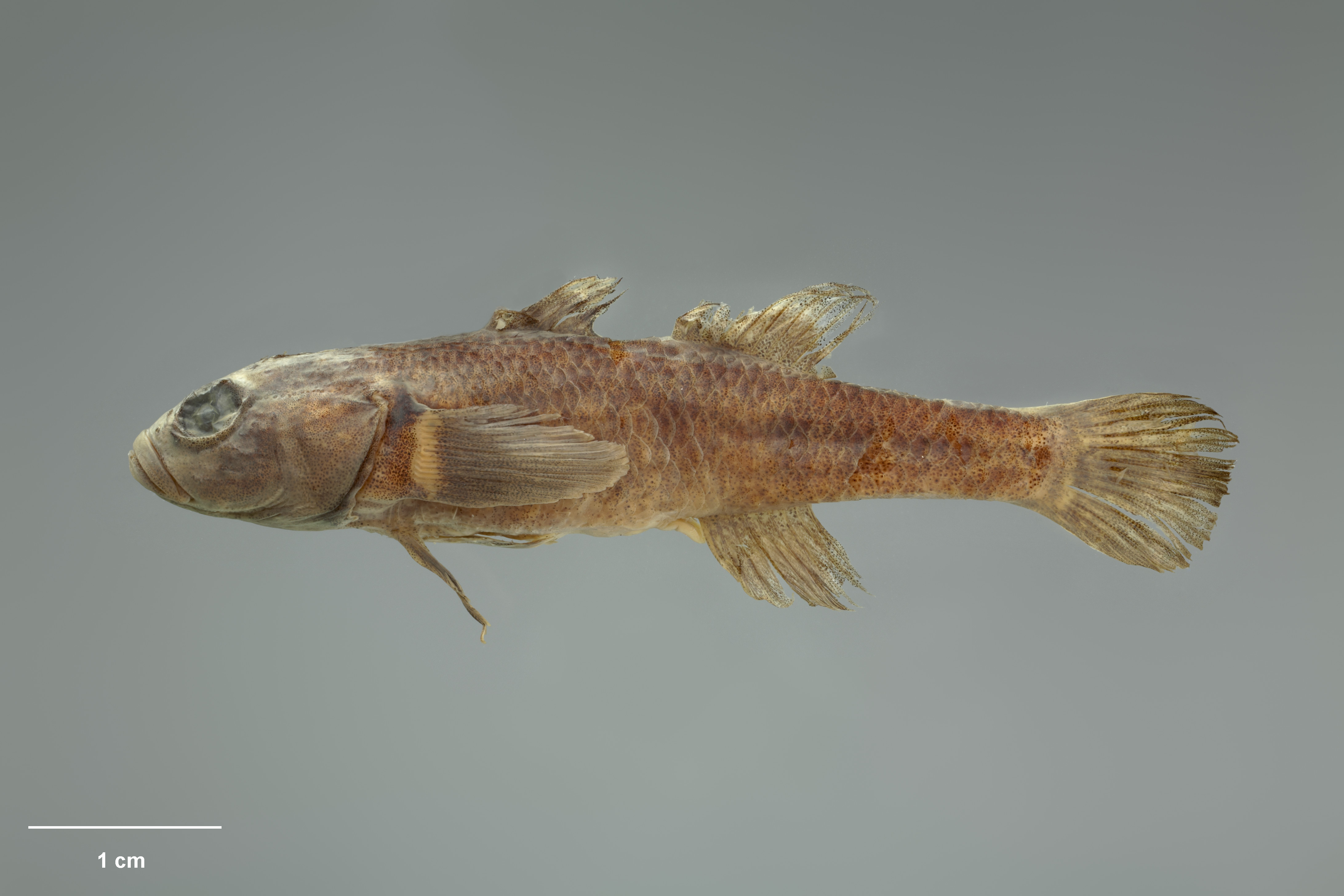
- Type specimen from the collections of Te Papa

Conservation status
- Least Concern (IUCN 3.1)

Scientific classification
- Kingdom: Animalia
- Phylum: Chordata
- Class: Actinopterygii
- Division: Teleostei
- Order: Gobiiformes
- Family: Eleotridae
- Genus: Gobiomorphus
- Species: G. alpinus

Binomial name
- Gobiomorphus alpinus Stokell, 1962
- Approximate known distribution (in orange) of the Tarndale bully on a map of the South Island

= Tarndale bully =

Species of fish

The Tarndale bully (Gobiomorphus alpinus) is a species of freshwater ray-finned fish belonging to the family Eleotridae, the spinycheek sleepers or bullies. This species is endemic to a few mountain lakes in the South Island of New Zealand.

== Taxonomy ==
The Tarndale bully was first formally described in 1962 by the New Zealand ichthyologist Gerald Stokell with its type locality given as Bowscale Tarn, Tarndale lakes, Marlborough, South Island, New Zealand from an elevation of 1,000 m (3,300 ft). This species is classified in the genus Gobiomorphus which was described in 1863 by the American naturalist Theodore Gill with Eleotris gobioides designated as its type species. The genus Gobiomorphus is classified in the family Eleotridae, which is classified within the suborder Gobioidei, the gobies, of the order Gobiiformes, which also includes the cardinalfishes and sand divers.

== Etymology ==
The Tarndale bully is classified in the genus Gobiomorphus, this name being a combination of gobio, a small fish of little value, a gudgeon, with morphius, meaning "having the shape of". This repeats the meaning of the specific name of the type species, goboides. The specific name of the Tarndale bully, alpinus, means of "alpine", i.e. high mountains an allusion to the high altitude this species is found at.

== Description ==
The Tarndale bully has no open pores in the head, no scales on the gill cover and isthmus and it has more than 16 rays in the pectoral fin. It is a thin, spindle shaped fis, with a big head and large fins. The overall colour is olive-brown, with six to seven grey-black saddle-markings on the upper body and a creamish to golden ventral surface. The holotype had a standard length of 59 mm (2.3 in).

== Distribution and habitat ==
The Tarndale bully is endemic to New Zealand where it is only found in the Tarndale basin of the catchments of the Wairau River and Waiau Toa / Clarence River in Marlborough on New Zealand's South Island. Rhis is a solitary, territorial and secretive species of high altitude lakes.
