= Stokell's smelt =

Scientific classification
- Kingdom: Animalia
- Phylum: Chordata
- Class: Actinopterygii
- Order: Osmeriformes
- Family: Retropinnidae
- Genus: Stokellia; Whitley, 1955
- Species: S. anisodon

Binomial name
- Stokellia anisodon (Stokell, 1941)
- Approximate known distribution (in orange) of Stokell's smelt on a map of the South Island

Species of fish

Stokell's smelt (Stokellia anisodon) is a small freshwater fish endemic to New Zealand. It is the only member of the genus Stokellia. This species is found in rivers between the Waiau and Waitaki Rivers on the east coast of the South Island of New Zealand. Their length is 7–9 centimetres (2.8–3.5 in). The genus is named in honour of Gerald Stokell.

In recent years their numbers have declined rapidly.
