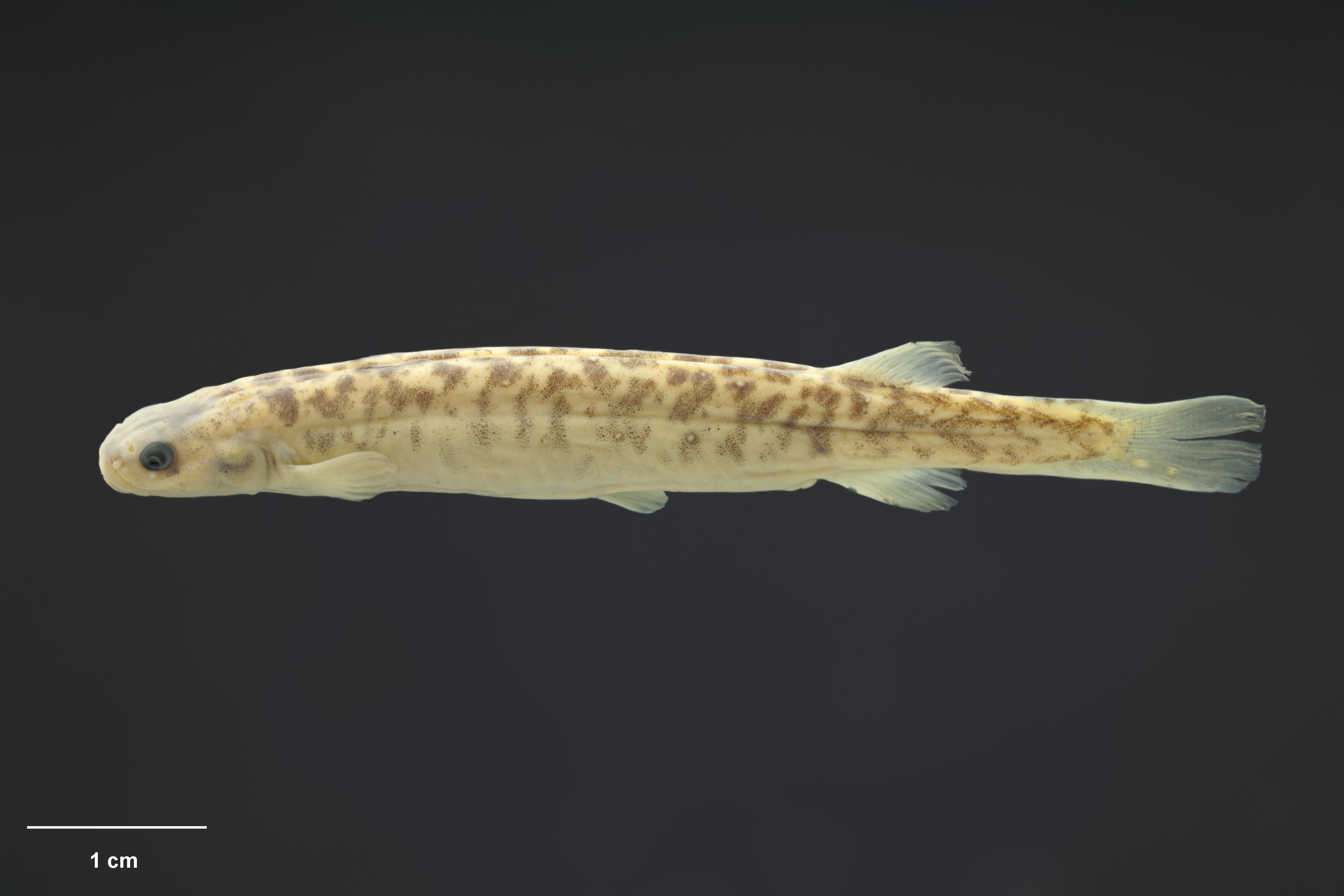

Conservation status
- Critically Endangered (IUCN 3.1)

Scientific classification
- Kingdom: Animalia
- Phylum: Chordata
- Class: Actinopterygii
- Division: Teleostei
- Order: Galaxiiformes
- Family: Galaxiidae
- Genus: Galaxias
- Species: G. macronasus

Binomial name
- Galaxias macronasus McDowall & Waters, 2003
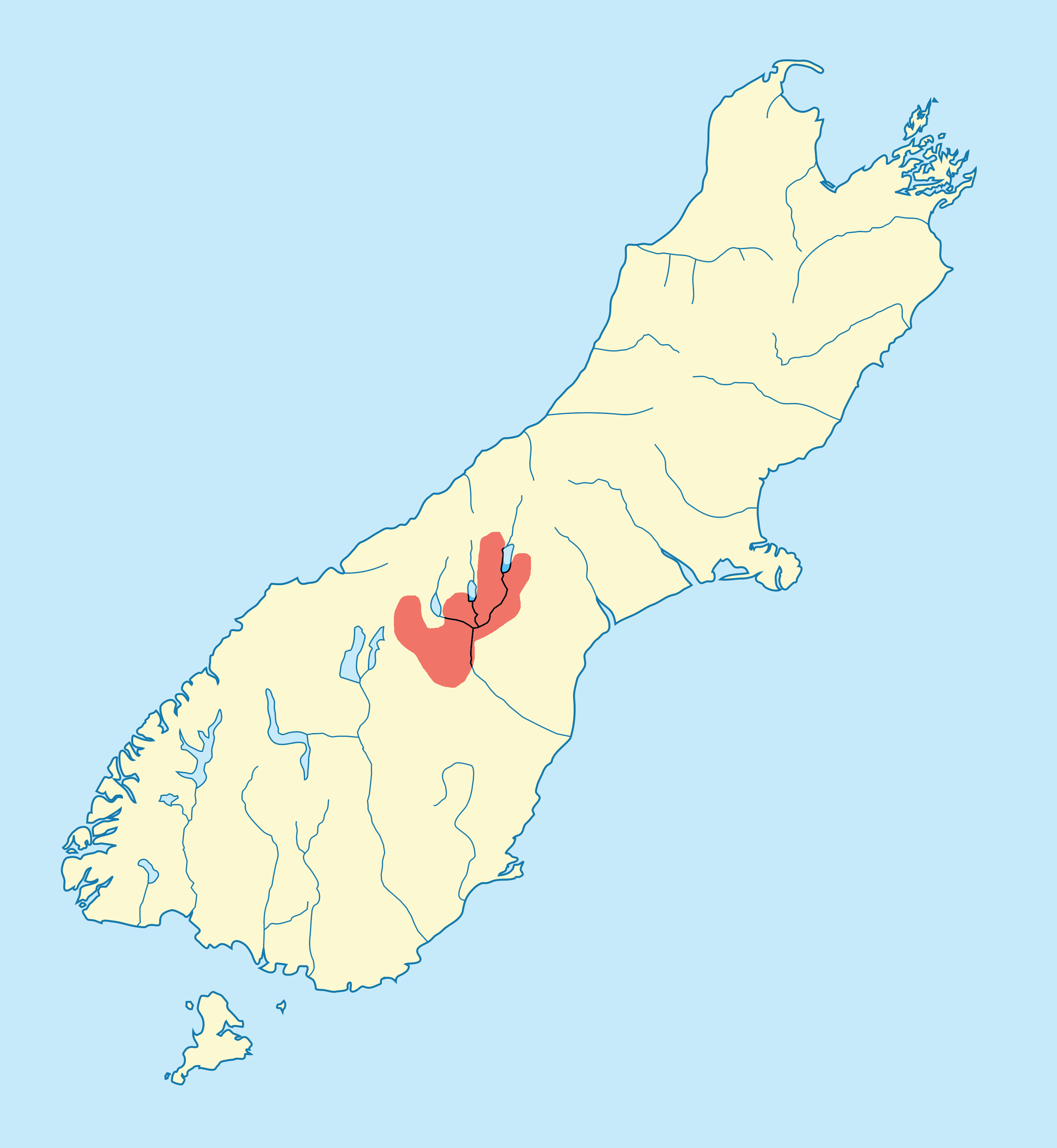
- Approximate known distribution (in red) of the bignose galaxias on a map of the South Island.

= Bignose galaxias =

Species of ray-finned fish

Bignose galaxias (Galaxias macronasus) is a galaxiid of the genus Galaxias, found in the upper Waitaki River catchment in the Mackenzie Basin in Otago, New Zealand. The species was described in 2003, after morphology and DNA sequencing distinguished it as a new species, closely related to other pencil galaxias species.

The species is non-diadromous, spending its entire life in freshwater unlike some other native galaxiids. Spawning is likely to take place during winter. They are a slender fish, golden-amber in colour, with dark mottling and a rounded head.

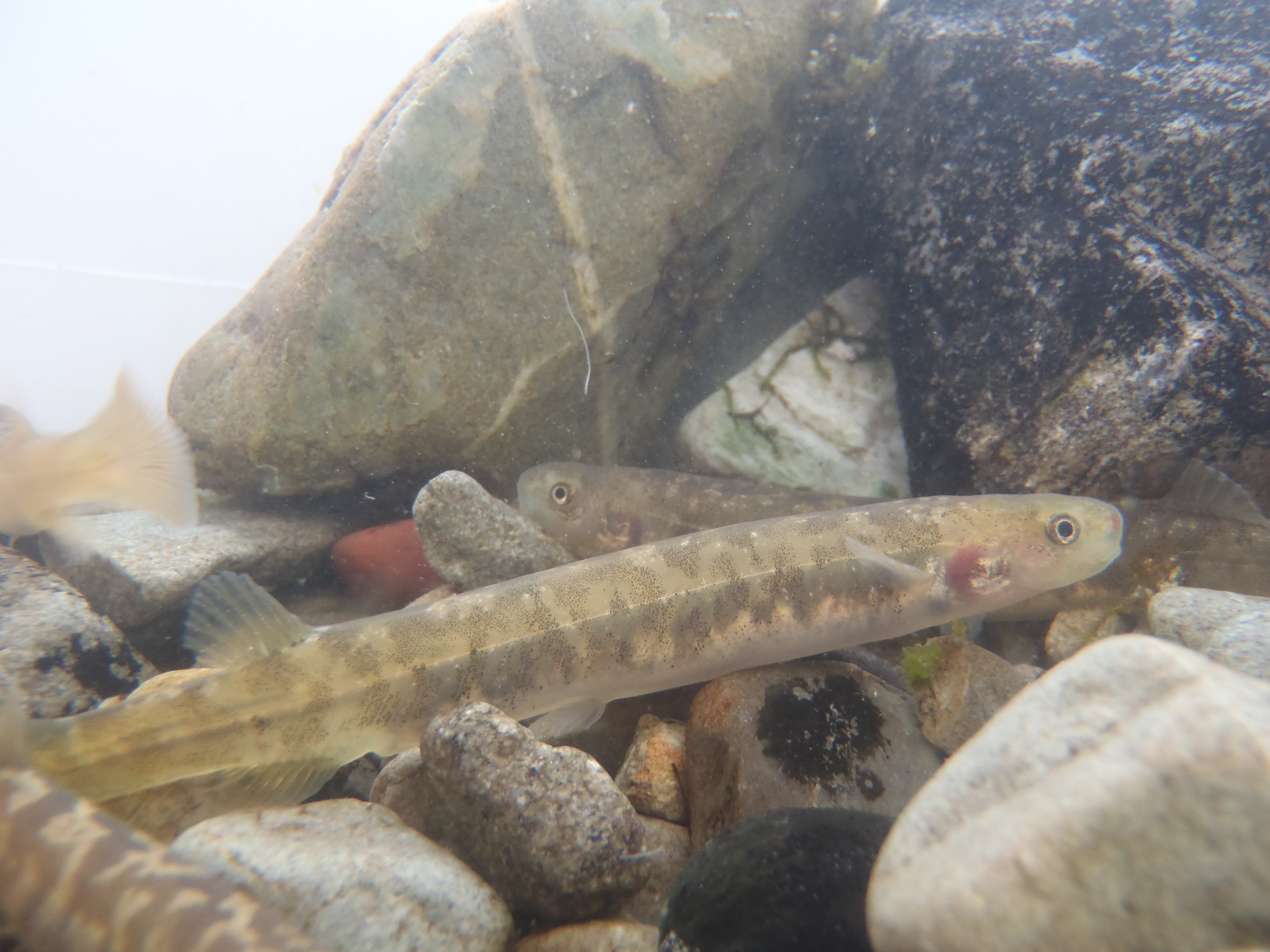
Galaxias macronasus
