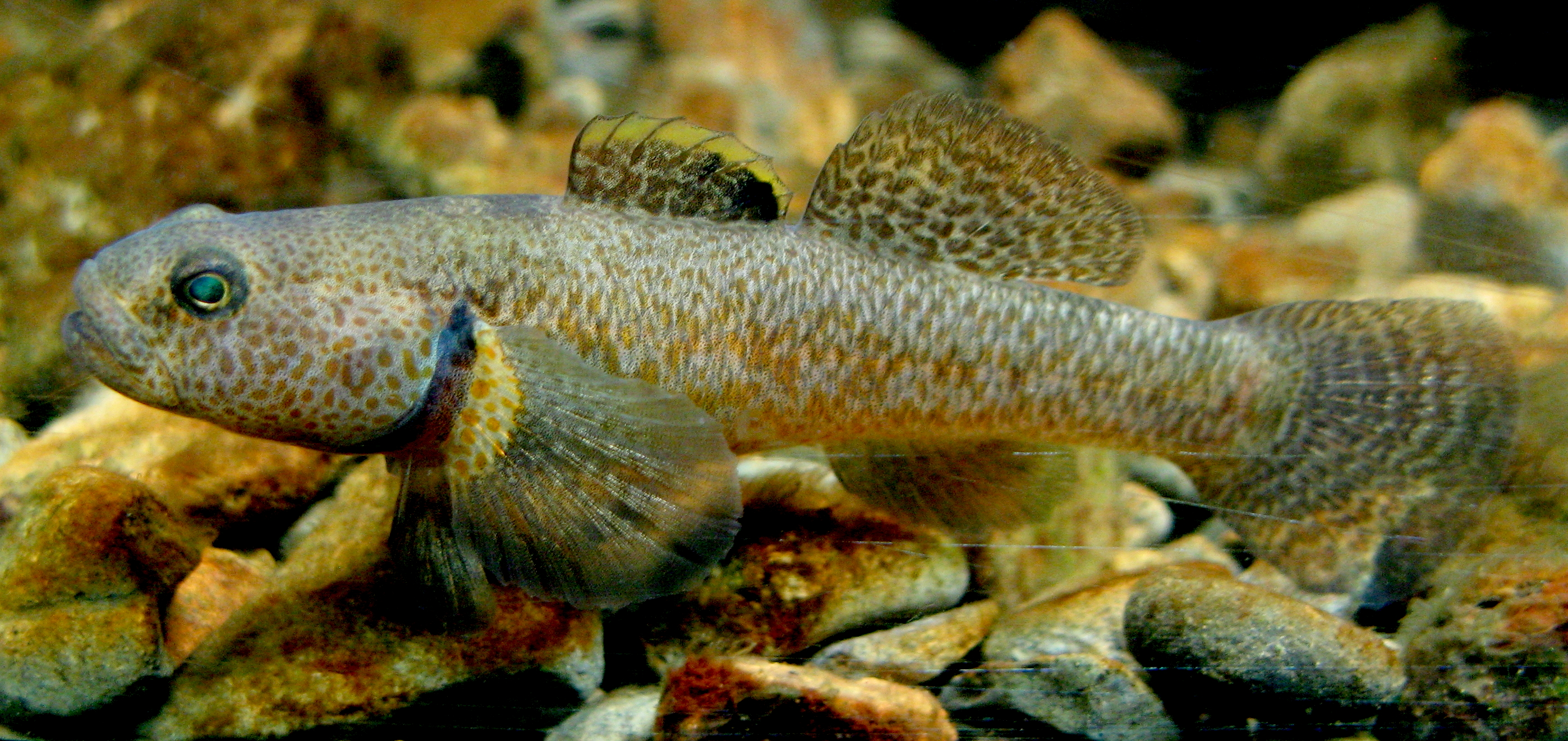
- Male

Conservation status
- Least Concern (IUCN 3.1)

Scientific classification
- Kingdom: Animalia
- Phylum: Chordata
- Class: Actinopterygii
- Order: Gobiiformes
- Family: Eleotridae
- Genus: Gobiomorphus
- Species: G. breviceps

Binomial name
- Gobiomorphus breviceps (Stokell, 1939)
- Approximate known distribution (in orange) of the upland bully on a map of New Zealand

Synonyms
- Philypnodon breviceps Stokell, 1939

= Upland bully =

Species of fish

The upland bully (Gobiomorphus breviceps) is a species of fish in the family Eleotridae endemic to freshwater habitats in New Zealand. Both sexes have distinctive orange-brown dots all over the head. Adults generally reach a length of 8–10 cm (3.1–3.9 in).

== Description ==
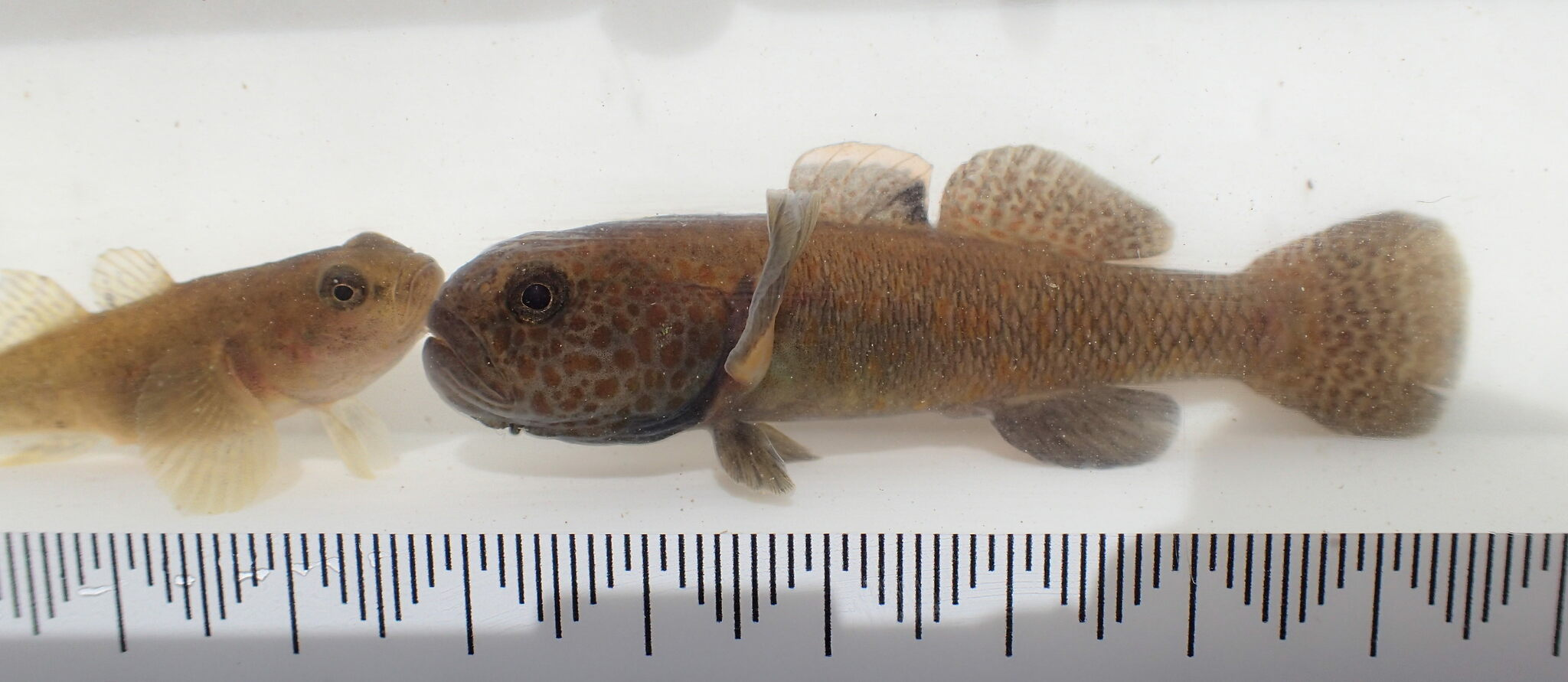
Showing scale, in New Zealand

Male upland bullies are larger and more stocky than females, with bolder markings. The face is profusely marked with orange spots, and there is a cream vertical band at the base of the pectoral fins.

Like other Gobiomorphus species, the first dorsal fin of males features a coloured stripe. The colour of the stripe in upland bullies appears to be locally variable. Many populations have bright orange dorsal stripes, however some have bright green, pink, yellow, cream or uncoloured stripes.

== Life cycle ==
Upland bullies are neither diadromous nor migratory – they remain in freshwater for their whole lives.

Over spring and summer, the male establishes and defends a 'nest' – usually a hollow beneath a rock. Males prefer larger nests, however when in the presence of a predator, more enclosed nest sites are favoured. While defending the nest, the male turns very dark, from brown to completely black.

When a female is ready to lay eggs, she enters the nest and turns upside-down to lay several hundred to a thousand oval eggs in a close-packed, single layer attached to the nest's 'ceiling'. The male then fertilises the eggs. The female leaves the eggs in the care of the male, which guards them until they hatch two to four weeks later. Females may lay eggs up to eight times over the spawning season, and one male may defend the eggs of more than one female.

Fry rear in still waters on the edge of streams. They reach sexual maturity in their first year and have an average lifespan around 3–4 years.

== Distribution ==
Upland bullies are widespread across the South Island, with large gaps on the west coast around the Tasman Mountains and from around Hokitika south. They are present in the lower half of the North Island, from the headwaters of the Mokau River in the west to southern Hawke's Bay in the east. Also present on Stewart Island.

There are five distinct genetic and geographical groupings. The largest and most distinctive covers most of the east coast of the South Island, while the remaining four are closely related and are found in the north of the South Island and in the North Island. The North and South islands are connected by land during the ice ages, which allowed upland bullies in the north of the South Island to spread further north. Upland bullies in the large southern group are often larger and more boldly patterned than their northern counterparts.

They can be found far inland as well as close to the coast. They are tolerant of a wide range of conditions but prefer slowly flowing water.
