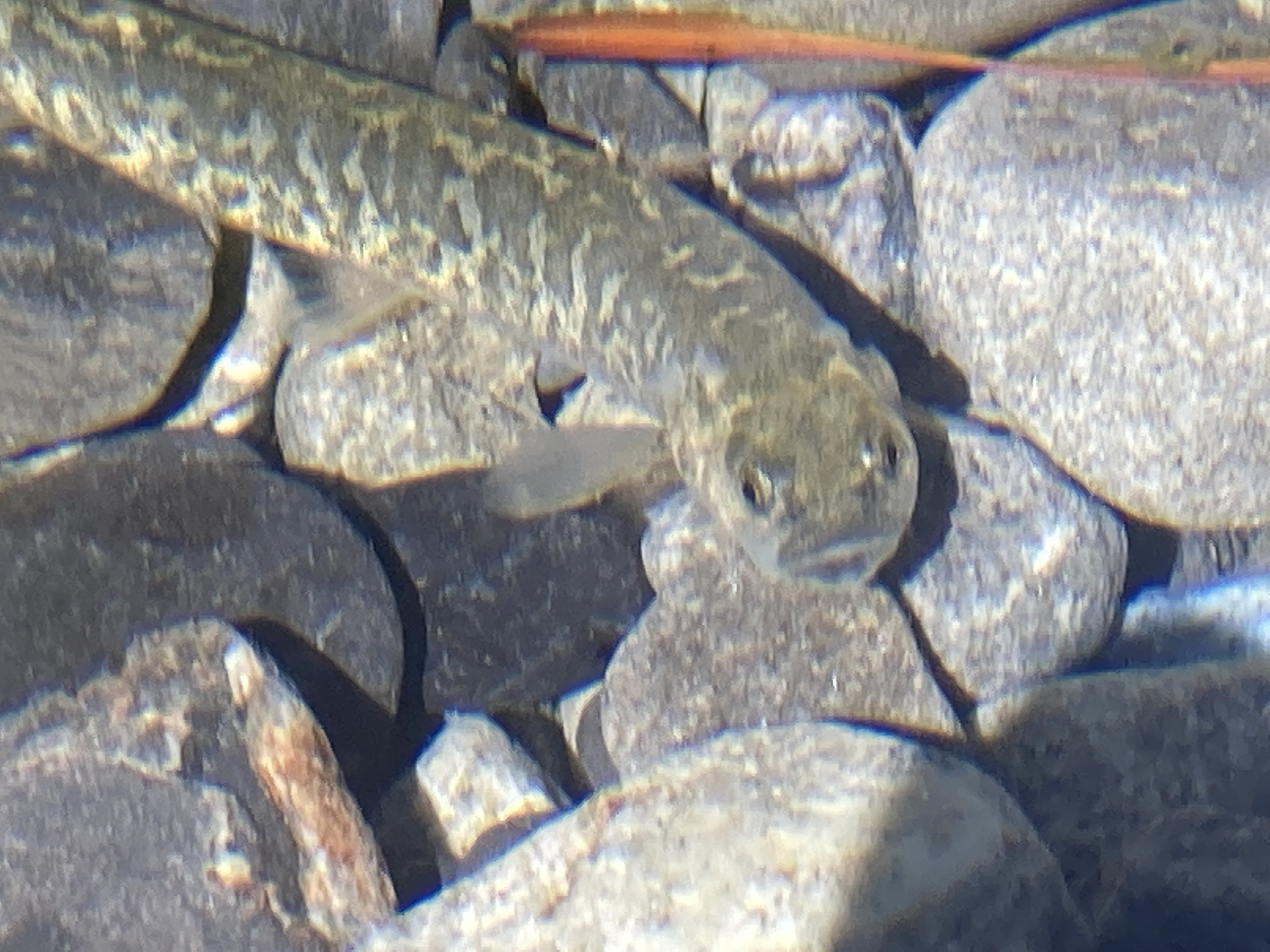

Conservation status
- Least Concern (IUCN 3.1)

Scientific classification
- Kingdom: Animalia
- Phylum: Chordata
- Class: Actinopterygii
- Order: Galaxiiformes
- Family: Galaxiidae
- Genus: Galaxias
- Species: G. paucispondylus

Binomial name
- Galaxias paucispondylus Stokell, 1938
- Approximate known distribution of the alpine river galaxias on a map of the South Island

= Alpine galaxias =

Species of ray-finned fish

The alpine river galaxias (Galaxias paucispondylus) is a galaxiid of the genus Galaxias, found only in mid to high elevation streams flowing from the Southern Alps of New Zealand. It grows to a length of up to 11 cm.

Alpine galaxias are speckled olive-green over a light brown base. The single large dorsal fin is rounded, and set back two thirds of the body length, the anal fin a little further back. The caudal fin is large and slightly forked. Like all galaxiids it lacks scales and has a thick, leathery skin covered with mucus.

They are non-diadromous and therefore do not have a marine phase and are not part of the whitebait catch.
