= Kauru River =

Coordinates: 45°05′S 170°49′E

Location
- Country: New Zealand

The Kauru River is a river of North Otago, New Zealand. A tributary of the Kakanui River, it rises in the east of the Kakanui Mountains and flows into that river west of Kia Ora.

== See also ==
- List of rivers of New Zealand
