= Longjawed galaxias =

Conservation status
- Critically Endangered (IUCN 3.1)

Scientific classification
- Kingdom: Animalia
- Phylum: Chordata
- Class: Actinopterygii
- Order: Galaxiiformes
- Family: Galaxiidae
- Genus: Galaxias
- Species: G. prognathus

Binomial name
- Galaxias prognathus Stokell, 1940
- Approximate known distribution (in orange) of the longjawed galaxias on a map of the South Island

Species of ray-finned fish

The longjawed galaxias (Galaxias prognathus) is a galaxiid of the genus Galaxias, found only in rivers and streams at mid to high altitudes on the eastern side of the Southern Alps in the South Island of New Zealand.

Longjawed galaxias are slender and elongate, having coloration consisting of spots and indistinct bands of various shades of brown and grey. The single dorsal and anal fins are about two thirds of the way along the body. Like all galaxiids it lacks scales and has a thick, leathery skin covered with mucus. The lower jaw is forward of the upper, giving rise to its common name. It grows to a length of up to 9 cm.

It is New Zealand's rarest native fish, sometimes known as ‘jaws’.
