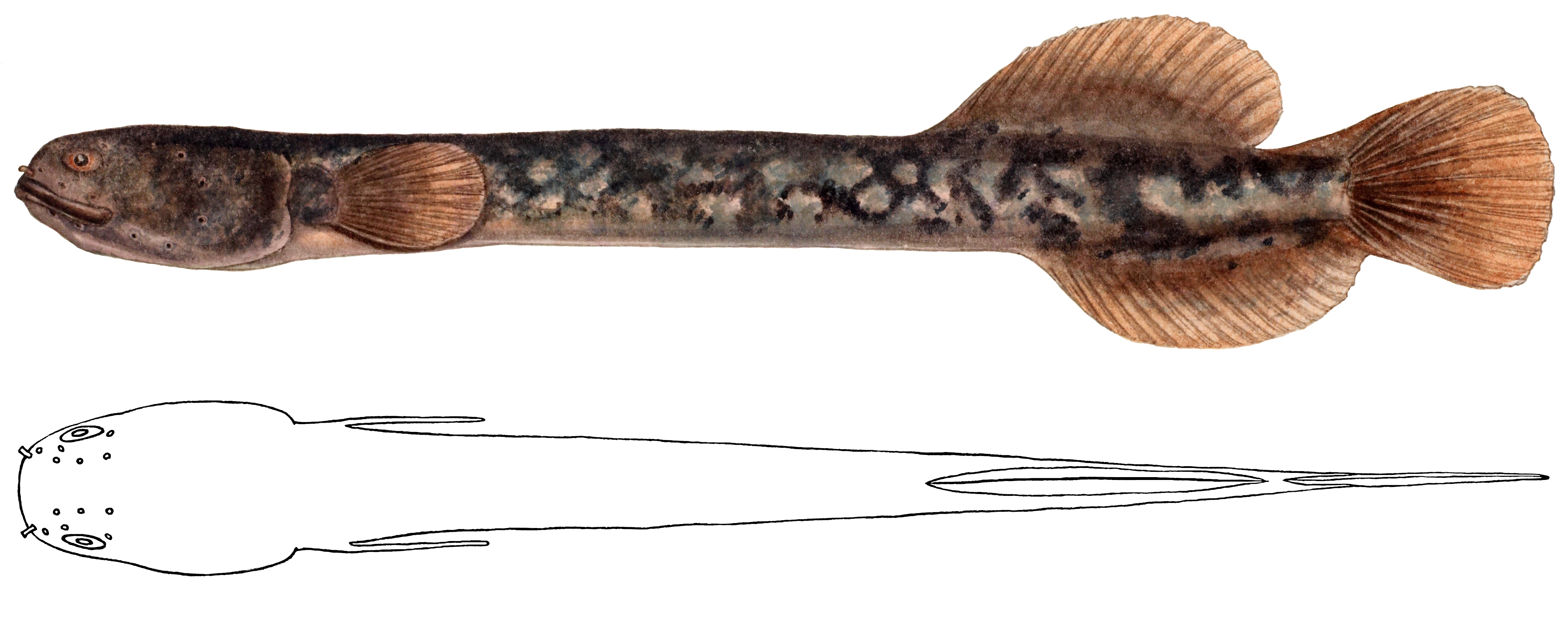

Conservation status
- Endangered (IUCN 3.1)

Scientific classification
- Kingdom: Animalia
- Phylum: Chordata
- Class: Actinopterygii
- Order: Galaxiiformes
- Family: Galaxiidae
- Genus: Neochanna
- Species: N. apoda

Binomial name
- Neochanna apoda Günther, 1867
- Approximate known distribution of the brown mudfish on a map of New Zealand

= Brown mudfish =

Species of ray-finned fish

The brown mudfish (Neochanna apoda) is a galaxiid endemic to New Zealand. The species is found in wetlands in the southwest of the North Island and the northern half of the west coast of the South Island. It commonly grows to 100–130 mm (3.9–5.1 in) in length, and it can live to at least 7 years. They are named for their brown color.

The dorsal and anal fins of the brown mudfish are very long-based, extending close to the caudal fin, nearly joining it.

It inhabits shallow swamp-forest wetlands. If the water dries out over summer, it is able to aestivate in damp areas, such as under logs and in root holes, until the water returns.

In 2014, the New Zealand Department of Conservation classified the brown mudfish as "At Risk: Declining" with qualifier "C(1/1) >100,000 mature individuals, predicted decline 10–70%", and the IUCN rated them as "Endangered".

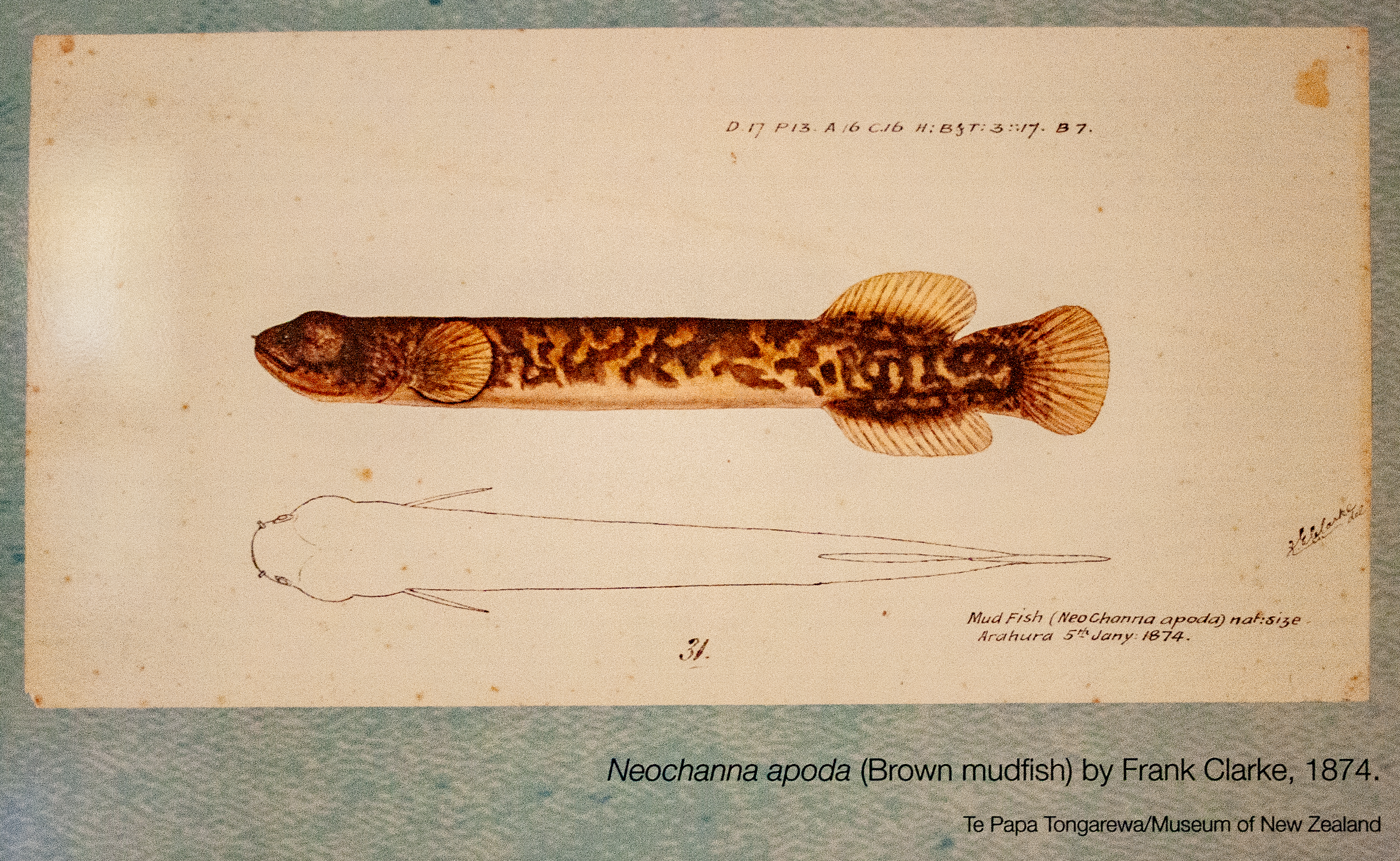
Neochanna apoda on a drawing by Frank Edward Clarke, 1874
