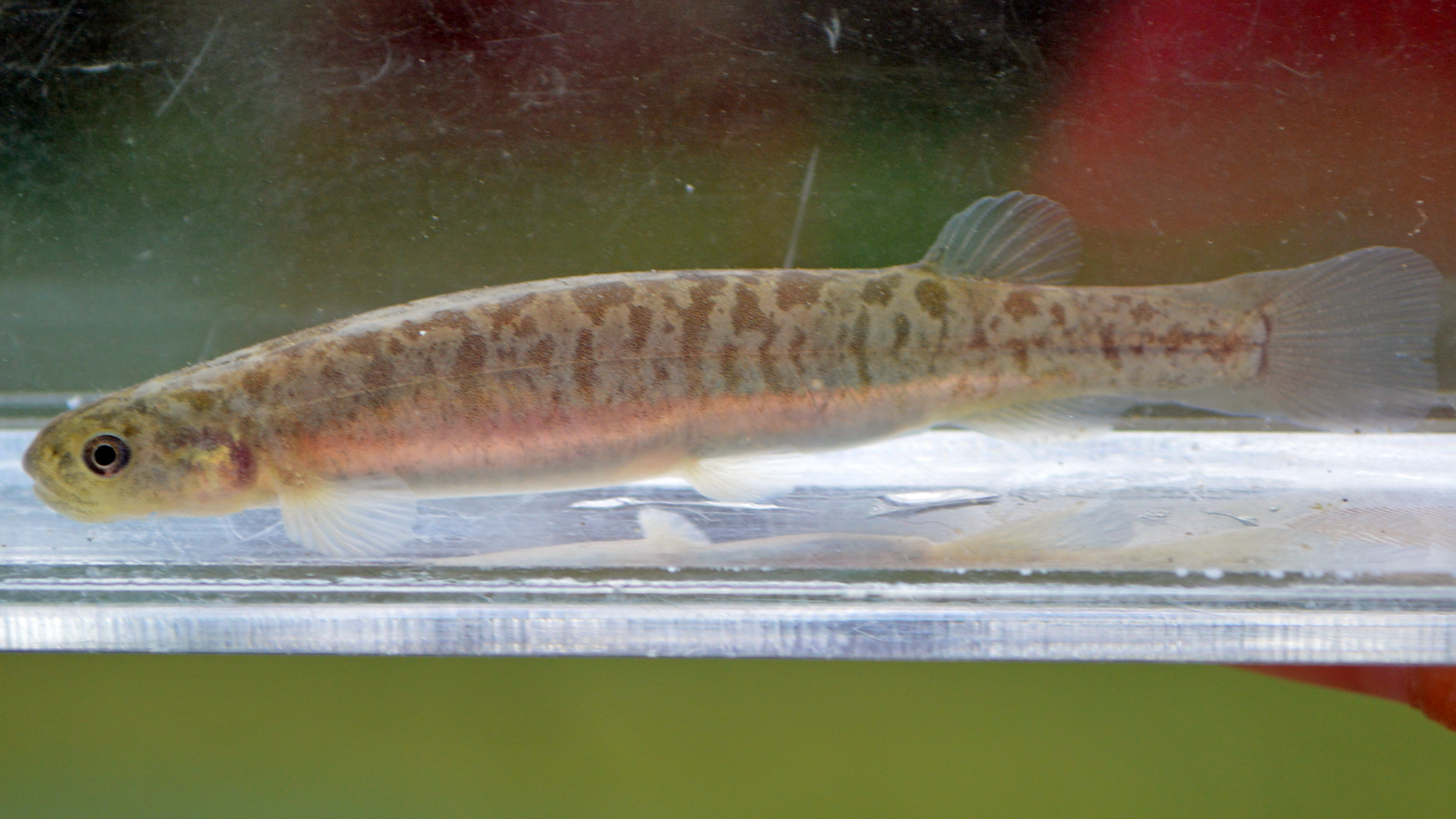
- Central Otago roundhead galaxias (Galaxias anomalus) from Kye Burn river

Conservation status
- Critically Endangered (IUCN 3.1)

Scientific classification
- Kingdom: Animalia
- Phylum: Chordata
- Class: Actinopterygii
- Order: Galaxiiformes
- Family: Galaxiidae
- Genus: Galaxias
- Species: G. anomalus

Binomial name
- Galaxias anomalus Stokell, 1959
- Approximate known distribution (in orange) of the Central Otago roundhead galaxias on a map of New Zealand

= Roundhead galaxias =

Species of ray-finned fish

The Central Otago roundhead galaxias (Galaxias anomalus) is a galaxiid of the genus Galaxias, found only in the Taieri and Clutha catchments in Otago, New Zealand. It grows to a length of up to 13 cm (5.1 in).
