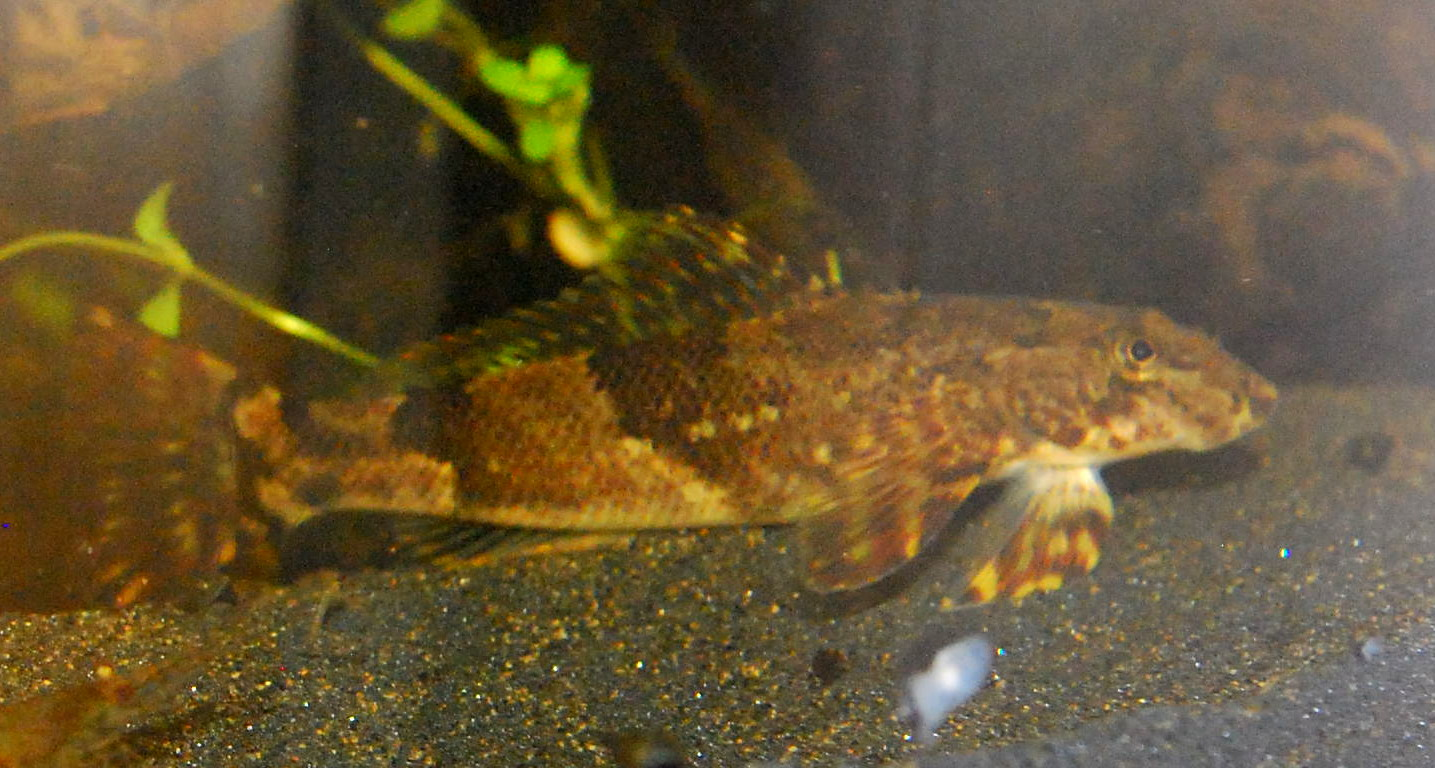

Conservation status
- Vulnerable (IUCN 3.1)

Scientific classification
- Kingdom: Animalia
- Phylum: Chordata
- Class: Actinopterygii
- Division: Teleostei
- Order: Labriformes
- Suborder: Uranoscopoidei
- Family: Cheimarrichthyidae; Regan, 1913
- Genus: Cheimarrichthys; Haast, 1874
- Species: C. fosteri

Binomial name
- Cheimarrichthys fosteri Haast, 1874
- Approximate known distribution (in orange) of the torrentfish on a map of New Zealand

= Torrentfish =

Species of ray-finned fish

The torrentfish (Cheimarrichthys fosteri), or panoko (Māori), is an amphidromous freshwater ray-finned fish that is endemic to New Zealand. Torrentfish are well adapted to life in shallow, fast-flowing riffles and rapids. They grow to a maximum of 20 cm (7.9 in) in total length, but more commonly reach 10–12 cm (3.9–4.7 in).

It is the only member of the monotypic genus Cheimarrichthys and the family Cheimarrichthyidae. It is most closely related to the sandperches in the family Pinguipedidae. It is the only member of the order Labriformes that inhabits freshwater habitats.

== Description ==
Torrentfish are stocky, with a flattened underside, arched back and a broad, downward-tapering head with eyes set high. The lower jaw is very undercut and is surrounded by a fleshy upper lip – an adaptation for picking invertebrates off the surface of stones. The fins are very robust. The pectoral fins are very large and triangular, angled so that water flowing over them presses the fish against the riverbed, helping them to stay in position in fast-flowing water. The pelvic fins are set underneath the head. The dorsal and anal fins have very long bases, the dorsal fin extending for nearly half of the body length. The tail fin is short and truncated or slightly forked, suited to sudden burst swimming rather than sustained swimming.

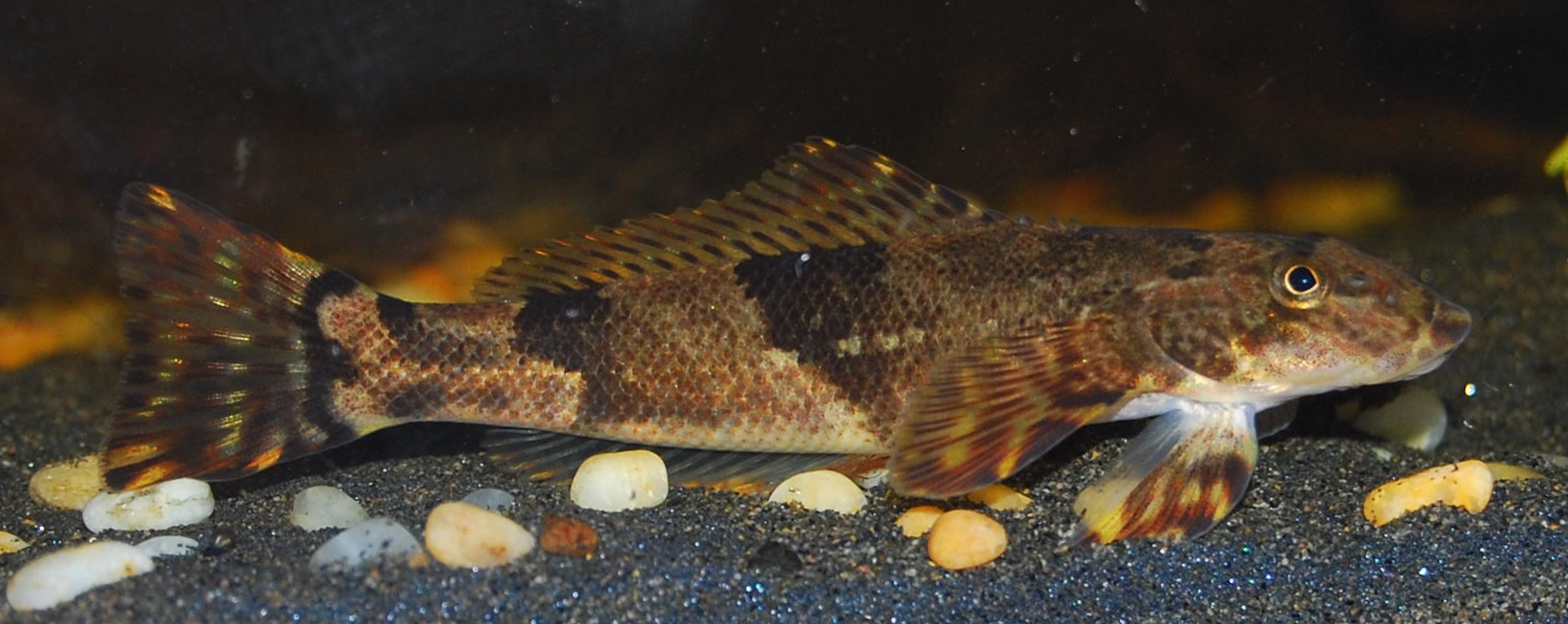
Torrentfish have distinctive stripes and an underslung jaw.

All torrentfish have a similar pattern of five dark stripes on a lighter background. There are three stripes on the body, generally angled downwards towards the head, with a fourth stripe vertically at the base of the tail and a fifth passing through the eyes and angling downwards towards the base of the pectoral fin. Their colouration is either dark grey on a lighter grey background, or dark brown on a lighter brown background, changing according to the surroundings of the fish. This colour pattern camouflages the torrentfish and help it to blend in with its stony habitat.

== Habitat ==
Torrentfish are primarily found in shallow, fast-flowing riffles and rapids. They spend little time actively swimming against the rapids, living instead amongst and beneath loose gravels and cobbles. They emerge from the rapids at night to feed. Torrentfish are solitary and benthic, but may be found in high densities where there is a large population. Because part of their life cycle is spent in the sea, they are found in higher numbers near the coast.

Torrentfish are mainly found in gravelly rivers, particularly braided rivers with wide, open channels. They favour rivers with highly unstable substrates, as the regular movement of the gravels maintains open gaps around and underneath the stones where the torrentfish can take refuge from fast water. Although they are strong swimmers, they are poor climbers and are only found far inland if the gradient is low and there are no barriers.

== Life cycle ==
Torrentfish are amphidromous: the fry go to sea after hatching, and return as juveniles to fresh water where they grow to adulthood. Female torrentfish are found further upstream than males, up to 235 km from the sea, with a large area of overlap. Females migrate downstream over summer and autumn when ready to lay eggs, and return upstream once spent. It is likely that they spawn in the lower reaches of waterways. Fry hatch and migrate to sea in late summer and autumn, returning a short time later in late autumn and winter. Because they have to spend time at sea, torrentfish are unable to form landlocked populations like some other New Zealand native fishes.

== Biogeography ==
The torrentfish is related to the blue cod, an obligate marine fish, and is one of only two New Zealand freshwater fish with local marine origins. All of the other New Zealand freshwater species have Australian freshwater ancestors which arrived in New Zealand via dispersal through the sea. The torrentfish is the only member of both its genus and its family.

== Conservation ==
In 2014 the New Zealand Department of Conservation classified the torrentfish as "At Risk: Declining" with the qualifier "C – very large population and low to high ongoing or predicted decline". Also in 2014 the IUCN rated the torrentfish as "Vulnerable". Torrentfish require a specialised habitat with cool, highly oxygenated, fast-flowing water, and so are threatened by water being taken for irrigation, water pollution, and climate change. River sedimentation is also a threat, as torrentfish need to live amongst loose gravels and are less common in waterways with compacted substrate.
