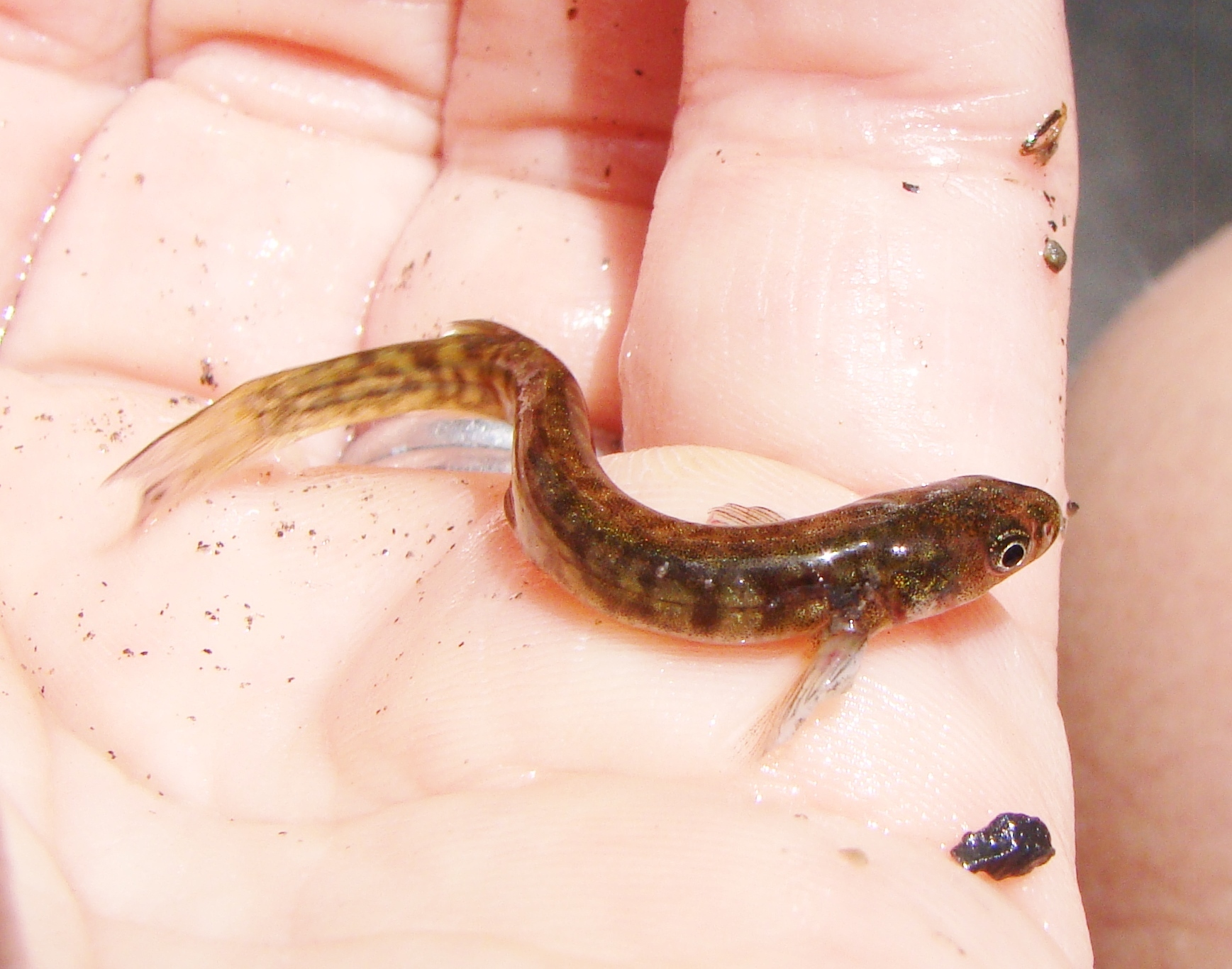

Conservation status
- Endangered (IUCN 3.1)

Scientific classification
- Kingdom: Animalia
- Phylum: Chordata
- Class: Actinopterygii
- Order: Galaxiiformes
- Family: Galaxiidae
- Genus: Galaxias
- Species: G. divergens

Binomial name
- Galaxias divergens Stokell, 1959
- Approximate known distribution (in orange) of dwarf galaxiason on a map of New Zealand

= Galaxias divergens =

Dwarf galaxias

Species of ray-finned fish

Galaxias divergens, common name dwarf galaxias, is a galaxiid of the genus Galaxias, found only in the lower North Island and upper South Island of New Zealand. It grows to a length of up to 9 cm.

The single dorsal and anal fins are about two thirds of the way along the body. Like all galaxiids it lacks scales and has a thick, leathery skin covered with mucus.

The dwarf galaxias has six pelvic fin rays, which distinguishes it from most other galaxiids which have only five.

Spawning occurs from March to May and also from October to November. They live on a variety of aquatic insects, especially mayflies and midges. They are non-diadromous and therefore do not have a marine phase and are not part of the whitebait catch.
