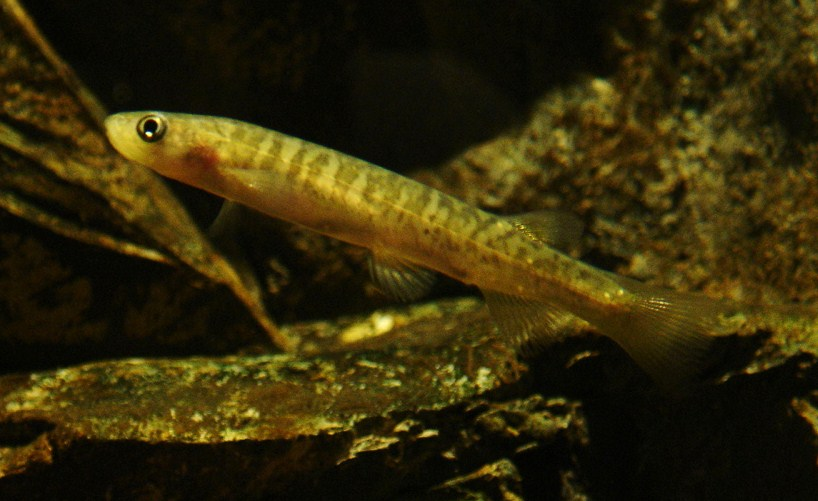

Conservation status
- Least Concern (IUCN 3.1)

Scientific classification
- Kingdom: Animalia
- Phylum: Chordata
- Class: Actinopterygii
- Order: Galaxiiformes
- Family: Galaxiidae
- Genus: Galaxias
- Species: G. vulgaris

Binomial name
- Galaxias vulgaris Stokell, 1949
- Approximate known distribution (in orange) of the common river galaxias on a map of the South Island

= Common river galaxias =

Species of fish

The common river galaxias or Canterbury galaxias (Galaxias vulgaris) is a galaxiid fish of the genus Galaxias, found only in the Canterbury and Otago regions of New Zealand.

== Description ==
Galaxias vulgaris are a small freshwater fish which usually grow to 100–115 mm in length. They have a large mouth with a somewhat undercut lower jaw, pinched nostrils and a rounded snout. The fins are thick and fleshy. The pectoral fins are low and downturned. The caudal peduncle long and slender, the length of which is about 1.5 times the depth.

They are a speckled brown/grey/olive to match the gravel substrate in which they live and have highly variable black banding or blotching along their back. This pigmentation is so effective as a camouflage, that it allows them to move out from the sanctuary under the rocks and spend time in the more open river in relative safety. They are easily confused with koaro which are slightly angled towards each other, but the eyes of G. vulgaris are larger and angled towards each other so the eyes are more visible when viewed from above. Galaxias vulgaris can be further distinguished from other Galaxid species by its less dense mottled pigmentations, a slightly larger and wider body than other species.

== Distribution ==
Galaxias vulgaris are found in rivers and streams throughout the Canterbury Region in the South Island (with the exception of Banks Peninsula and in eastern Otago.) The distribution ranges from low to high elevations in the shallow waters of rivers and streams. It is no longer found in many of the main river systems due to predation from introduced trout species Oncorhynchus mykiss (rainbow trout), and Salmo trutta (brown trout).

=== Habitat preferences ===
Preferred habitat of Galaxias vulgaris is fast flowing sections of stream which are well aerated and with open tussock grassland. Here, they inhabit the areas between and under rocks during the day and venture out into the more open areas of water to feed in the evening and night as Galaxias vulgaris generalized is solitary, nocturnal and largely cryptic invertebrate predator. Due to introduced trout, they are often excluded from the main base of rivers, or smaller over crowded rivers, but they can be found in side braids and tributaries.

As Galaxais vulgaris is a non-migratory fish, populations are confined to the river systems in which they are born. As they do not enter marine environments they become isolated from populations in other water systems. Often, the only interaction between populations in different rivers is during heavy flooding events.

== Life cycle/phenology ==
Unlike many other species in the genus, Galaxias vulgaris is a non-migratory species and complete their entire life cycle in freshwater. Spawning occurs from August to September. This involves the females laying hundreds to thousands of eggs beneath boulders in the stream, (the number of eggs laid is dependent of favourable or unfavourable environmental conditions) and the male fertilizing and temporarily guarding the eggs. The 'nest' is excavated by the male fish, and will generally be laid in by multiple females. Jones states that Galaxias vulgaris lay comparatively small eggs and have a higher fecundity (reproductive rate), than other non-migratory freshwater fish species. This allows relatively rapid colonization and re-colonization of habitat. The presence of predatory species, combine with late maturation and high juvenile mortality currently mitigates their ability increase their populations. Cadwallader found a very high mortality among adults, particularly males, post reproduction. The larvae (7–8 mm) hatch from the eggs after 3–4 weeks and form shoals in the slow flowing stream margins. They remain in these shoals until they become approximately 35 mm in length. At this size they have developed camouflage needed to blend into the gravel substrate, and separate from the shoal. Cadwallader found that the juveniles became mature and able to reproduce during early autumn. He also found that the trigger for sexual maturation was primarily controlled by fish size rather than time of year. This mean value for this threshold for sexual maturation was found to be approximately 59 mm in length.

== Diet and foraging ==
Galaxias vulgaris primarily feed on the nymphs and larvae of invertebrates. It is a predominately bottom dwelling fish, which feeds in both drift and benthos methods. It has been "observed that Galaxias vulgaris is nocturnally active. During the day the fish remained hidden in the substrate of the stream simulator. Immediately following emergence after sunset they took up drift-feeding stations in the water column, and later in the night switched to feeding on benthos". This is done in the evening and night as they spend the daytime hidden under rocks and in the gravel substrate. They feed into the current and pick up their food as it gets washed towards them. Their food consists of small stream invertebrates such as stoneflies and mayflies and while feeding during drift, preferring larger prey. Cadwallader found that individuals in slow moving areas of water would feed at mid-water in a similar fashion to introduced trout species. His study of the stomach composition of Galaxias vulgaris showed high abundances of Trichoptera (caddisfly) larvae, Corydalinae (dobsonfly) larvae, Deleatidium sp. (mayfly) larvae, aquatic Diptera, Elimidae (midges) adults and larvae, and terrestrial insects.

== Predators, parasites, and diseases ==
The key predator of Galaxias vulgaris are the salmonids Oncorhynchus mykiss (rainbow trout) and Salmo trutta (brown trout). Woodford and McIntosh found that populations of Galaxias vulgaris were heavily impacted by trout populations. Conversely, populations which were free from trout predation (usually due to geographic isolation) were at a higher altitude and were more stable than those in the presence of trout. Predation from trout occurs on Galaxias vulgaris at all stages of their lifecycles so there is no predation safe size threshold, however juveniles are particularly susceptible to predation from trout of all sizes.

== Cultural uses ==
There is no cultural use of Galaxias vulgaris.

== Protection and conservation ==
In 2014 the New Zealand Department of Conservation classified G. vulgaris as "At Risk: Declining" with the qualifier "A(2/1) - Total area of occupancy ≤ 1000 ha (10 km2), predicted decline 10–30%". Also in 2014 the IUCN rated the SPECIES as "Least Concern", noting that rates of decline are slow.

The ranges where the Galaxias vulgaris inhabit are with in New Zealand's Department of Conservation managed areas which means that these areas are protected, though there is still a large threat from the invasive salmonids. Habitat loss due to increasing irrigation from agricultural land use change is a threat to Galaxias vulgaris. The International Union for Conservation of Nature notes that there is an increased risk of habitat loss post tenure review in the high country. Much of the land which became freehold incorporates the habitat of Galaxias vulgaris and now has the potential to be altered for farming purposes, endangering the habitat of Galaxias vulgaris. Galaxias vulgaris is however classified as Not Threatened.
