= Clayton Bay =

- Town
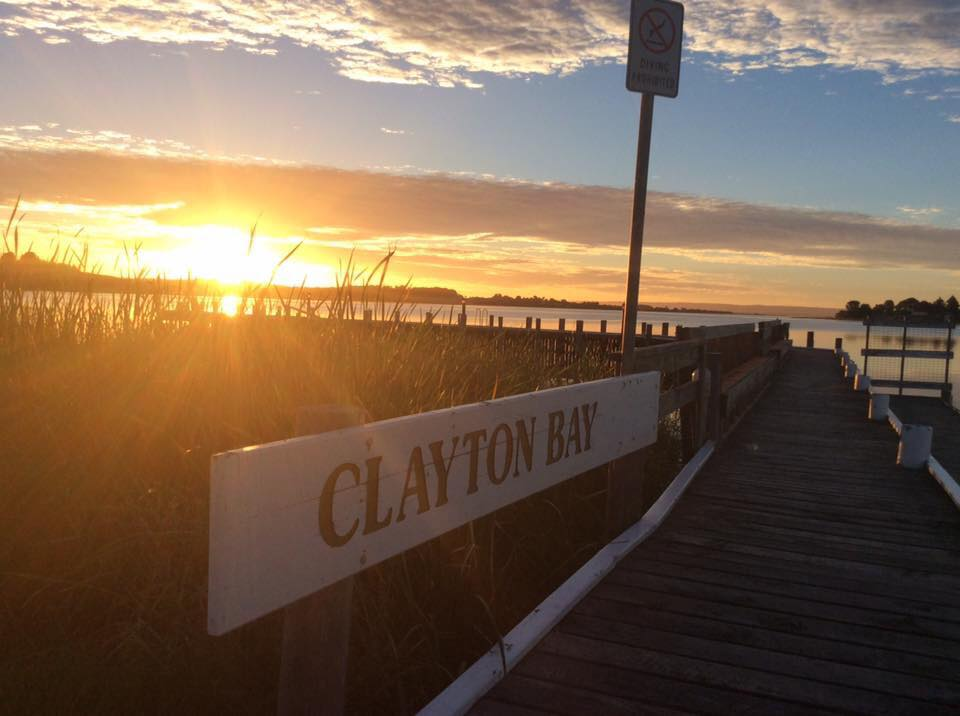

- Coordinates: 35°29′44″S 138°54′40″E
- Country: Australia
- State: South Australia
- Region: Fleurieu and Kangaroo Island
- LGA: Alexandrina Council
- Location: 87 km (54 mi) SE of Adelaide; 30.7 km (19.1 mi) E of Goolwa
- Established: 1858 (town); 31 August 2000 (locality)

Government
  - State electorate: Hammond
  - Federal division: Mayo
- Elevation: 70 m (230 ft)

Population
  - Total: 386 (UCL 2021)
- Time zone: UTC+9:30 (ACST)
  - Summer (DST): UTC+10:30 (ACDT)
- Postcode: 5256
Localities around Clayton Bay
Finniss	Milang	Lake Alexandrina
Currency Creek	Clayton Bay	Lake Alexandrina
Hindmarsh Island	Hindmarsh Island	Point Sturt

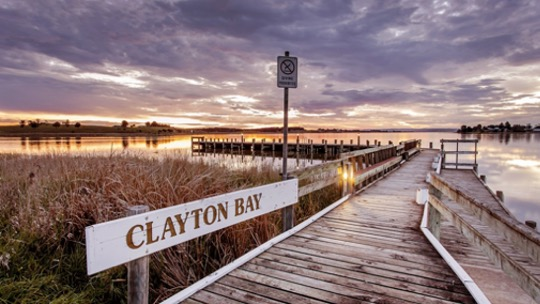
Clayton Bay Foreshore

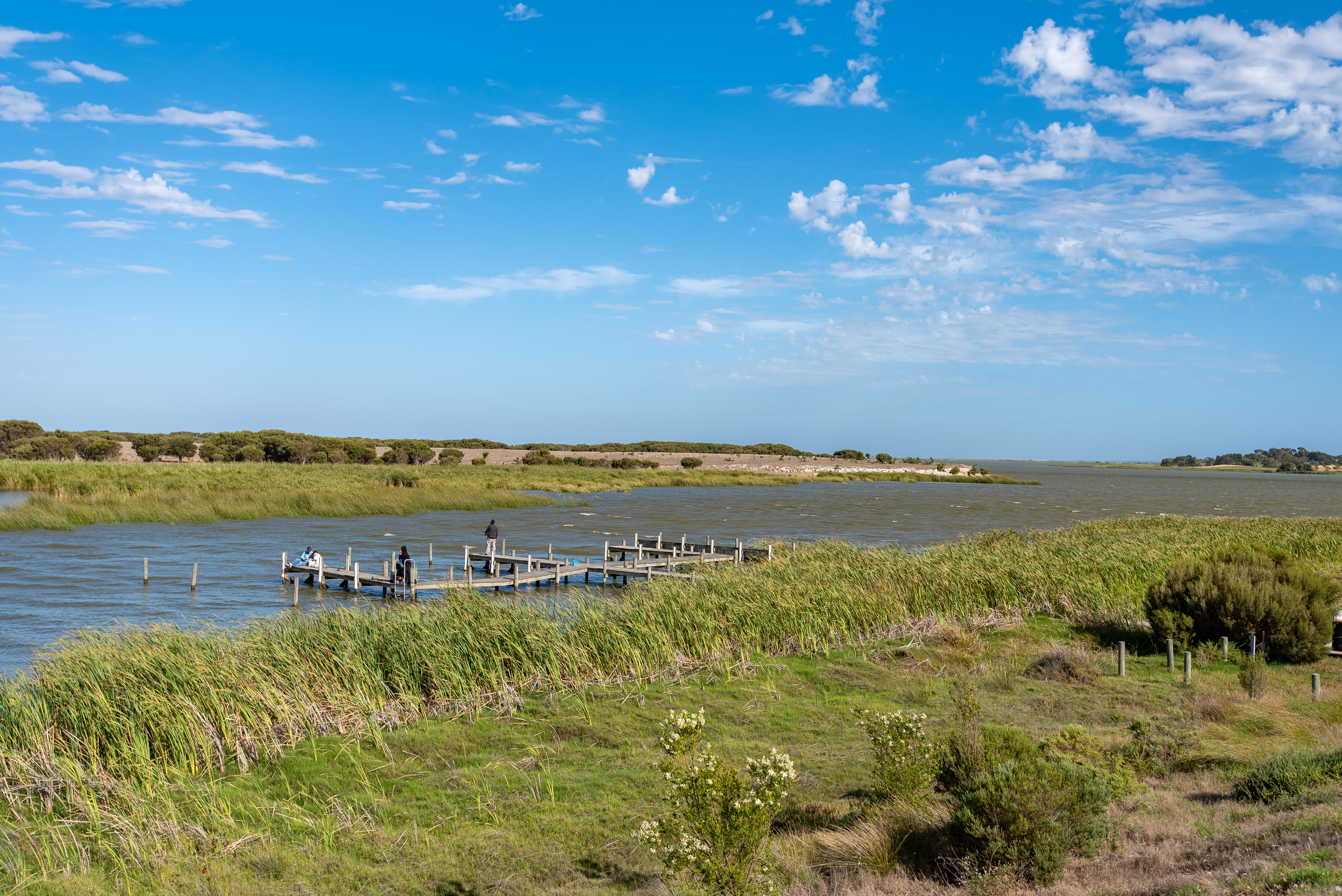
Wetlands and shore frontage, Eastern side of Clayton Bay

Clayton Bay is a town in South Australia located on Lake Alexandrina and Lower Murray River, part of the lower lakes and Coorong region at the end of the Murray River System. The town is located north of the north-east tip of Hindmarsh Island about 87 kilometres (54 mi) from Adelaide and 30.7 kilometres (19 mi) by road from Goolwa.

In 2008, the name of Clayton was officially changed to Clayton Bay by application to the Alexandrina Council and the government of South Australia to avoid confusion with Clayton, Victoria.

== Description ==
The wetlands, waters, foreshore and wider environs at Clayton Bay host spectacular sunsets and area attracting national and international environmentalists, ornithologists, bird watchers, photographers, artists, botanists, anthropologists, astronomers and those engaged in ecotourism and water based activities, particularly sailing (popular due to seasonal high wind speeds).

Experience is needed for water activities as the area is very exposed to the wind and the shallow nature of Lake Alexandrina and Lower Lakes creates large choppy waves. Waters around the area are classified as either 'protected' and 'semi-protected' waters by the South Australian Government. Appropriate safety equipment according to those classifications is required under legislation for all boating activities. Anyone aboard a motorised boat less than 4.8 metres long must wear a life jacket of all times, and children aged 12 or younger must do so in open areas of boats up to 12 metres in length.

== International significance ==
Clayton Bay is included within the Coorong, Lower Murray, Lower Lakes, Murray Mouth, Lake Alexandrina and Lake Albert wetland, as one of Australia's most important wetland areas.

Australia designated the site, covering approximately 140,500 ha in South Australia, as a Wetland of International Importance under the Ramsar Convention on Wetlands in 1985. The Coorong, and Lakes Alexandrina and Albert Wetland RAMSAR site:

...encompasses the Coorong National Park, Lake Alexandrina, Lake Albert, and tributaries, up to +0.85m AHD. Where unalienated crown land, DEWNR reserve or crown land under licence exists adjacent to the waters edge the boundary has been extended to include this cadastral parcel. The site excludes all privately owned fringing wetlands around the edge of the lakes except for land subject to inundation in Clayton Bay, Marshall Bight and Tookayerta Creek.

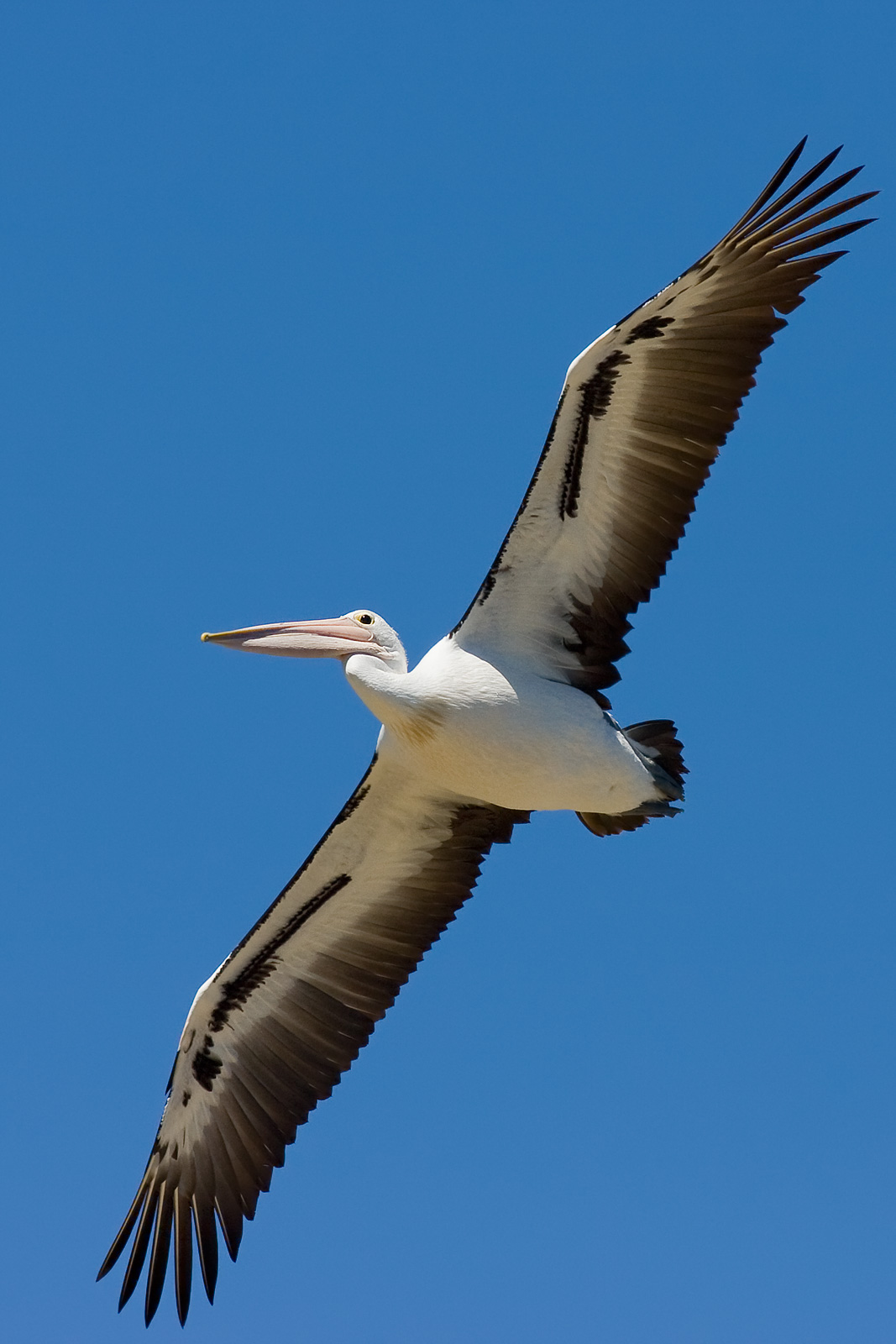
Australian pelican (Pelecanus conspicillatus) flight

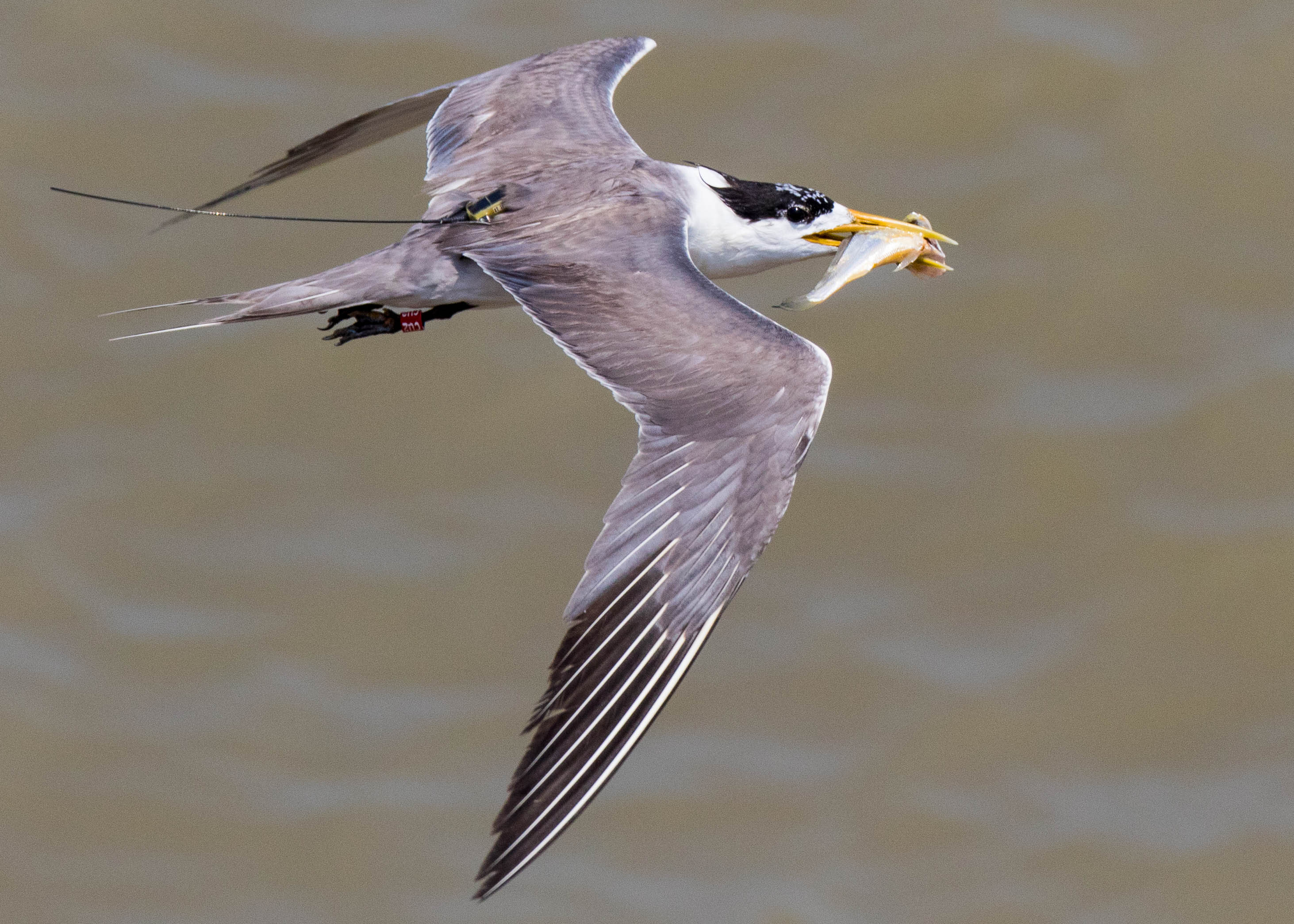
Greater crested tern with a fish in its beak

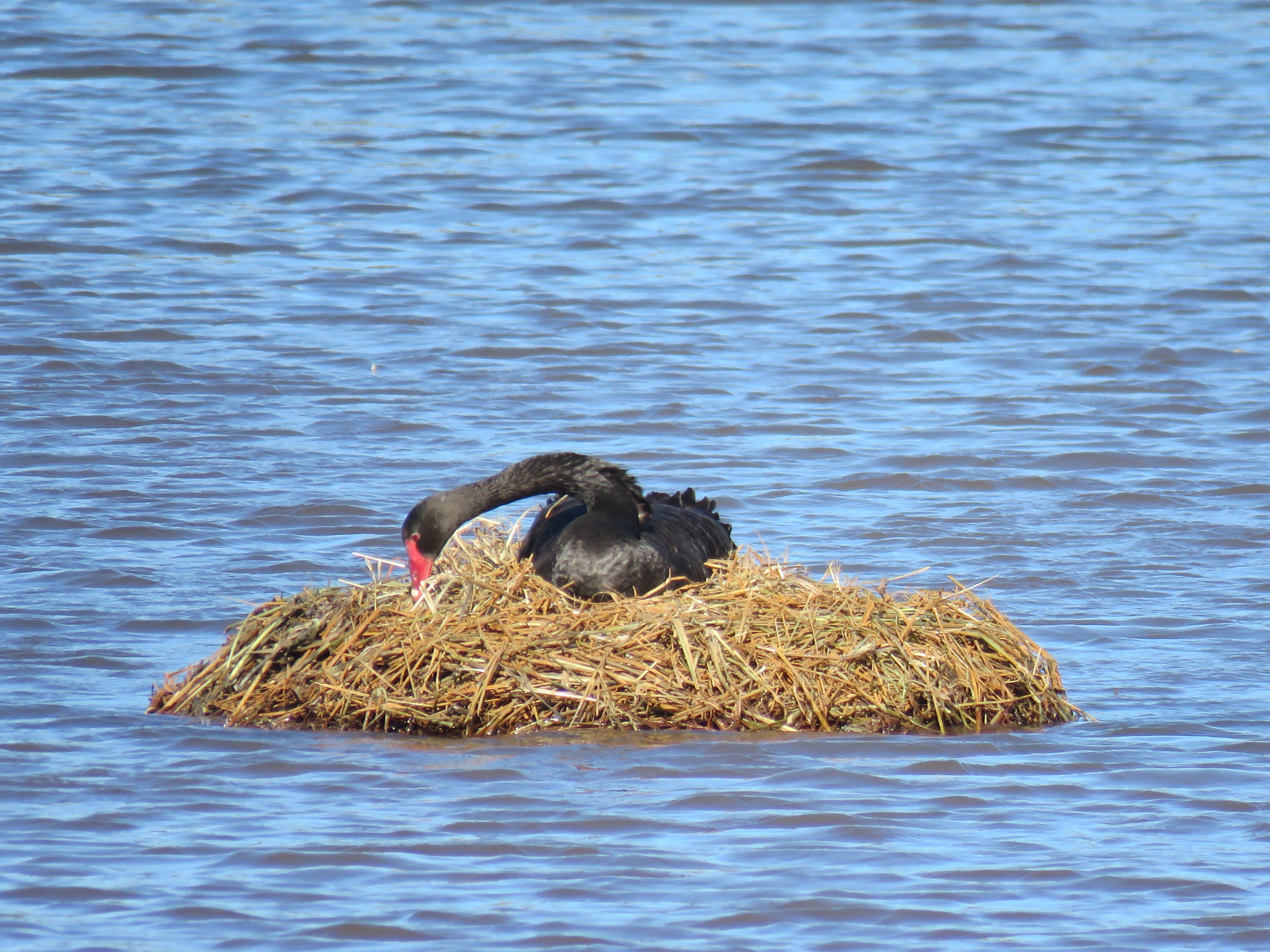
Black swan and nest

Wetlands in Clayton Bay and surrounds are nesting and breeding grounds for a large variety of migratory birds. Under RAMSAR criteria the wetlands supports one or more percent of the population of the following species:

- Australian Pelican (Pelecanus conspicillatus)
- Australasian bittern (Botaurus poiciloptilus)
- Australian shelduck (Tadornis tadornoides)
- Australian Painted Snipe (Rostratula australis benghalensis)
- Banded Stilt (Cladorhynchus leucocephalus)
- Black Swan (Cygnus atratus)
- Chestnut Teal (Anas castanea)
- Curlew Sandpiper (Calidris ferruginea)
- Greater Crested Tern (Thalasseus bergii)
- Grey Teal (Anas gracilis)
- Hoary-headed Grebe (Poliocephalus poliocephalus)
- Red-capped Plover (Charadrius ruficapillus)
- Red-necked Stint (Calidris ruficollis)
- Sharp-tailed Sandpiper (Calidris acuminata)
- Silver Gull (Larus novaehollandiae)
- Whiskered Tern (Chlidonias hybridus fluviatilis)
- Fairy Tern (Sterna nereis nereis)
- Australian Painted Snipe (Rostratula aust)
- Red-capped Plover (Charadrius ruficapillu)
- Australasian Swamphen (Porphyrio melanotus)
- Australasian Shoveler (Anas rhynchotis)

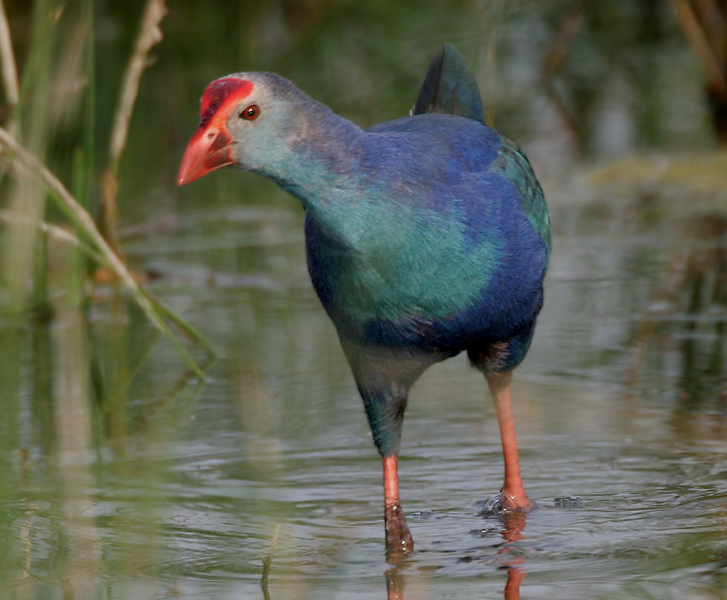
Purple Swamphen (Porphyrio porphyrio)

Many other birds can be seen in the region including:

- Australian magpie (Gymnorhina tibicen)
- Willie Wagtail (Rhipidura leucophrys)
- Long-billed Corella (Cacatua tenuirostris)
- Galah (Eolophus roseicapilla)
- Welcome Swallow (Hirundo neoxena)
- Pied Butcher Bird (Cracticus nigrogularis)
- Tawny Frogmouth (Eurostopodus argus)
- Purple Swamphen (Porphyrio porphyrio) and more.

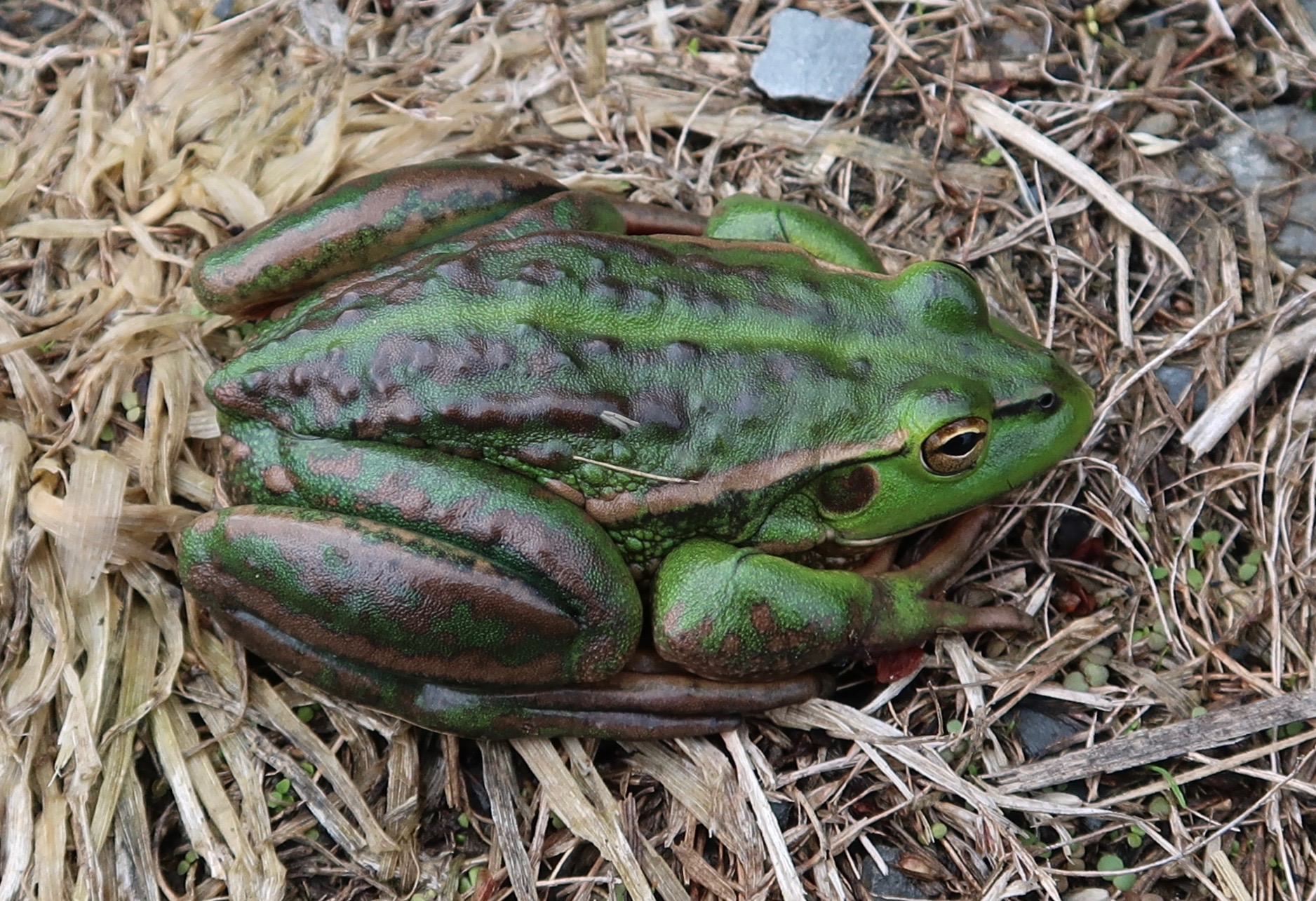
Southern Bell frogs (Ranoidea raniformis)

The area is inhabited by common, threatened and/or endangered species of mammals, amphibians, and reptiles. These include:

- Swamp Rat (Rattus lutreolus),
- Murray Turtle (Emydura macquarii)
- Yellow-bellied Water Skink (Eulamprus heatwolei),
- Eastern long-necked turtles (Chelodina longicollis),
- Eastern brown snakes (Pseudonaja textilis)
- Tiger snakes (Notechis scutatus)
- Southern Bell frogs (Ranoidea raniformis)

There are populations of kangaroos, sleepy lizards (Tiliqua rugosa) and short-beaked echidnas (Tachyglossus aculeatus) within the town and environs.

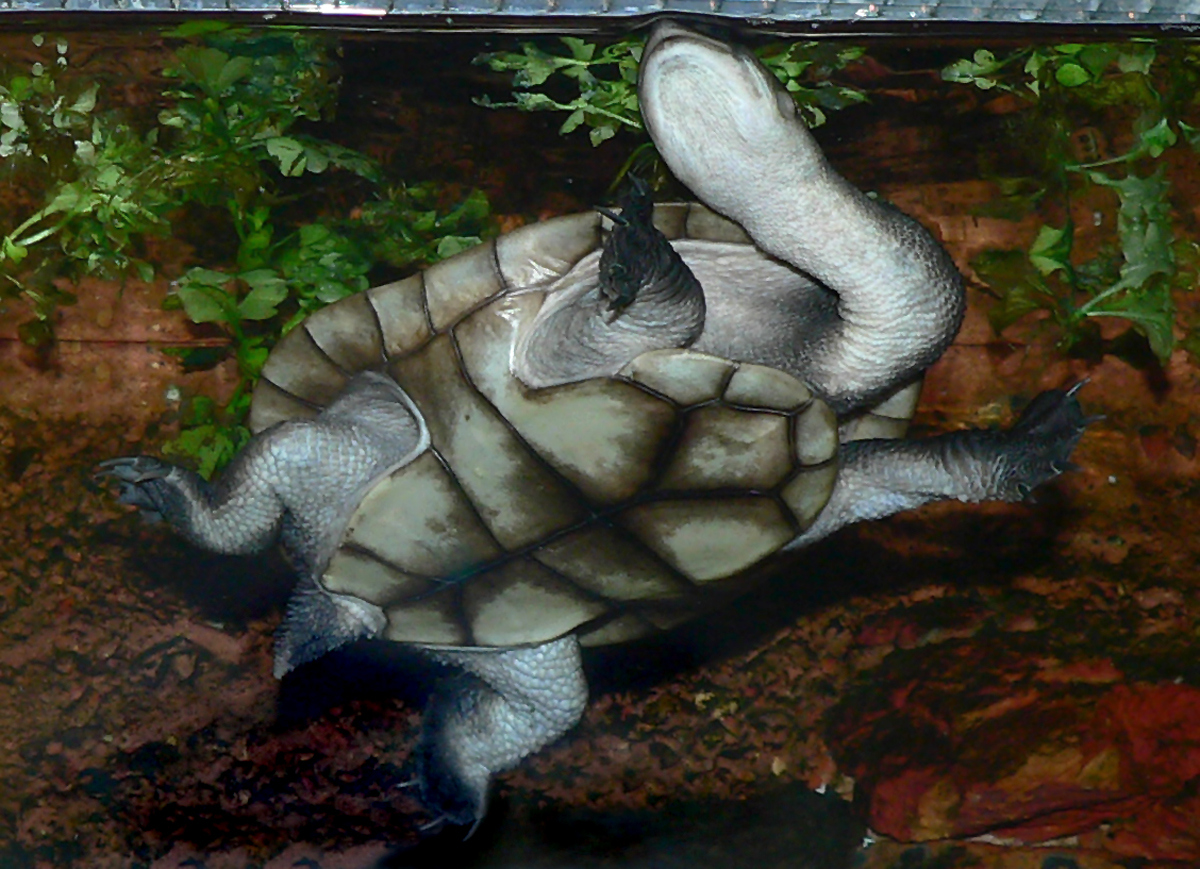
Chelodina longicollis – ventral view of female

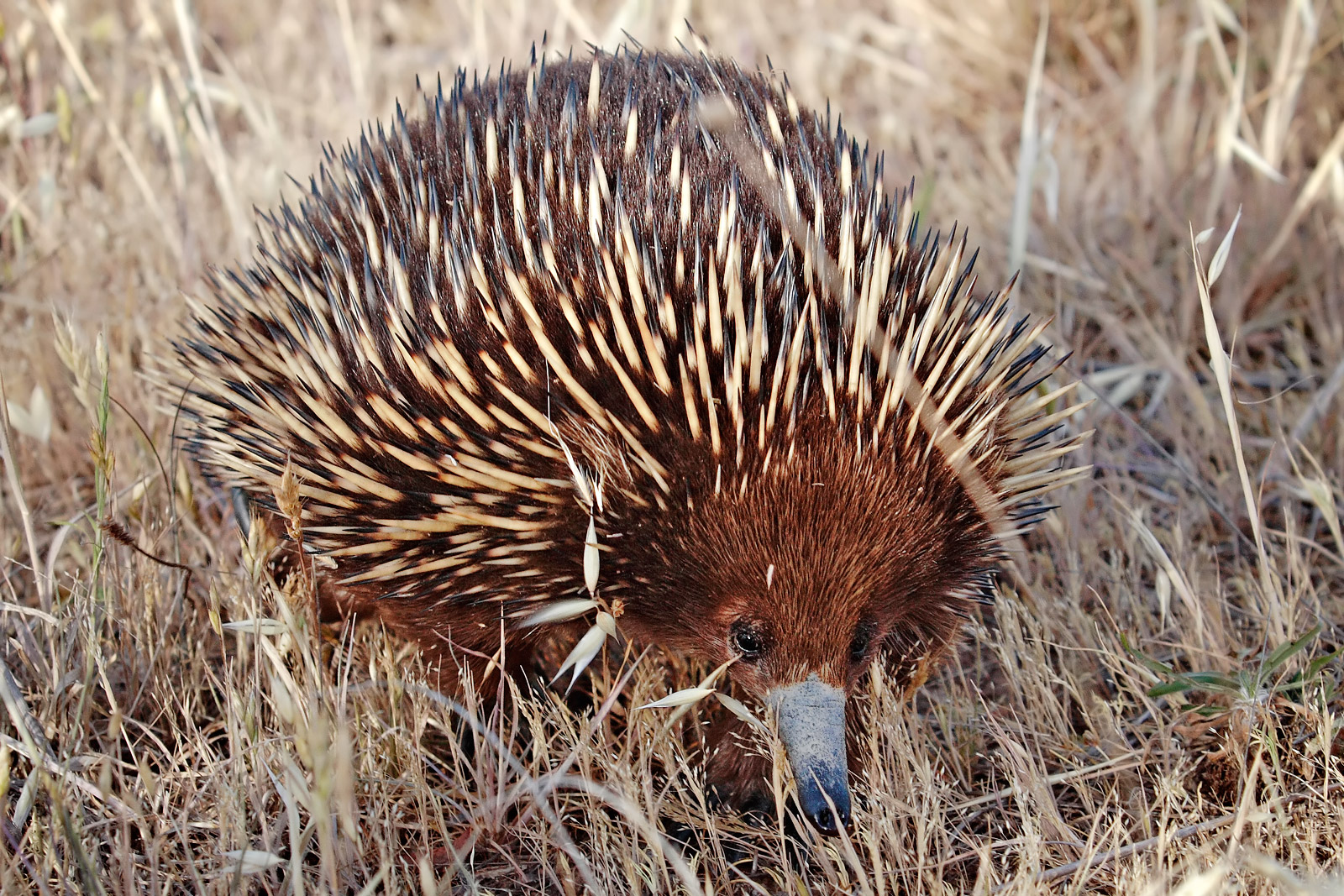
Shortbeak echidna

Plant species include:

- River club rush (Schoenoplectus validus)
- Sandhill Greenhood Orchid (Pterostylis arenicola)
- Silver Daisy-bush (Olearia pannosa ssp pannosa)
- Diverse reed beds
- Freshwater herblands (e.g. Triglochin sp.)
- Cutting Grass (Gahnia filum) sedgeland,
- Swamp Paperbark (Melaleuca halmaturorum)
- Lignum shrubland (Muehlenbeckia florulenta)
- Samphire chenopod shrubland (including Tecticornia pergranulata ssp. Pergranulata, Suaeda australis, Sarcocornia quinqueflora and Juncus kraussi).

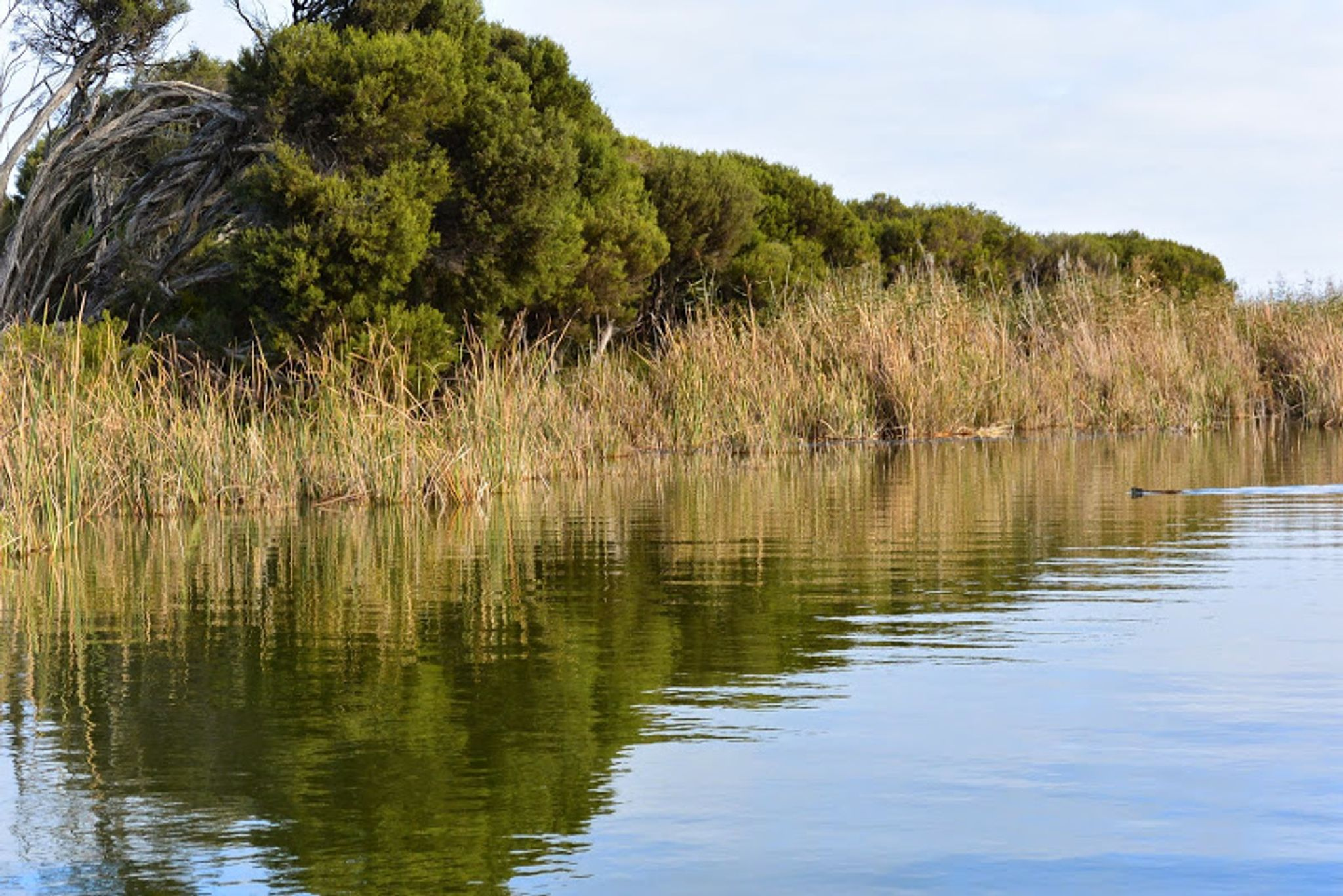
Clayton Bay Wetland Vegetation

The Ramsar site supports approximately 43 fish species including:

- Basinendemic Yarra Pygmy Perch (Nannoperca obscura),
- Small-mouthed Hardyhead (Atherinosoma microstoma)
- Murray cod (Maccullochella peelii peelii)
- Murray Hardyhead (Craterocephalus fluviatilis)
- Lagoon Goby (Tasmanogobius lasti)
- Tamar Goby (Afurcagobius tamarensis).
- Freshwater Catfish (Tandanus tandanus)
- Southern Purple-spotted Gudgeon (Morgurnda adspersa)
- Southern Pygmy Perch (Nannoperca australis)
- Yarra Pygmy Perch (Nannoperca obscura)
- Flat-headed Gudgeon (Philypnodon grandiceps)
- Dwarf Flat-headed Gudgeon (Philypnodon macrostomus)
- Unspecked Hardyhead (Craterocephalus stercusmuscarum fulvus)
- Congolli (Pseudophritis urvillii)
- Pouched Lamprey (Geotria australis)
- Short-headed Lamprey (Mordacia mordax)
- Mountain Galaxias (Galaxias olidus)
- Estuary Perch (Macquaria colonorum)
- Short-finned Eel (Anguilla australis)

== History ==
=== Aboriginal history ===
The Ngarrindjeri peoples are the Aboriginal Australian Owners of the lower Murray River, eastern Fleurieu Peninsula, and the Coorong of the southern-central area of the state of South Australia. The Ngarrindjeri consist of several distinct if closely related groups, including the Jarildekald, Tanganekald, Meintangk and Ramindjeri, who began to form a unified cultural bloc after Aboriginal peoples were forcibly removed to Raukkan, South Australia (formerly Point McLeay Mission).

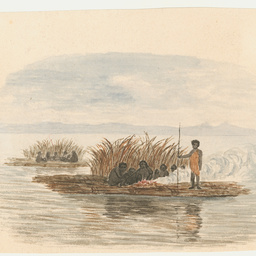
Ngarrindjeri raft with people cooking, a fire and a windbreak (approx. 1845) Watercolour by Alex C. Kelly (1811–1877)

Archaeology, particularly in excavations conducted at Roonka Flat, (which affords an outstanding sites for investigating "pre–European contact Aboriginal burial populations in Australia,") have revealed that the traditional lands of the Ngarrindjeri have been inhabited since the Holocene period, beginning around 8,000 B.C. down to around 1840 CE.

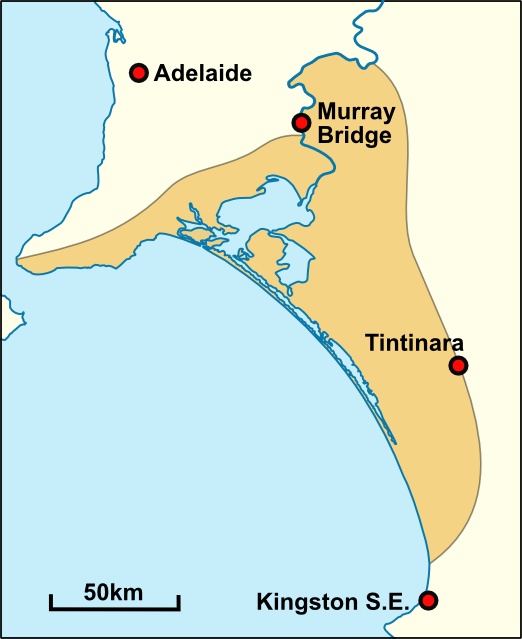
Approximate historical extent of Ngarrindjeri territory.

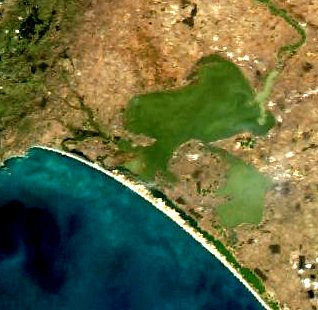
Ngarrindjeri culture is centered around the lower lakes of the Murray River.

For thousands of years, the Lower Murray, Lower Lakes and Coorong region was one of the most densely populated areas of Australia, and the land (ruwe or ruwar) and waterways were home to thousands of Ngarrindjeri peoples. Ngarrindjeri lived in communities in the ruwe. Everything Ngarrindjeri needed was present–clean waters, foods, medicines, shelter and warmth.

==== Ngarrindjeri self-determination, control and management ====
Ngarrindjeri peoples and supporters have challenged and partnered with the South Australian Government for decades, including its natural resource management representatives, over questions of justice, agency, control, sovereignty and the decolonisation of existing and long-standing relationships.

Ngarrindjeri led the development of the Coorong, Lower Lakes and Murray Mouth (CLLMM) Ngarrindjeri Partnerships and Murrundi (Riverine) Recovery Projects. In 2002, the Alexandrina Council made an agreement with the Ngarrindjeri Nation. The agreement included a series of commitments to work together and offers an expression of sorrow and apology to the Ngarrindjeri peoples. It is known as the Kungun Ngarrindjeri Yunnan (KNY) Agreement.

In 2007, the Ngarrindjeri Nation launched the Ngarrindjeri Nation Yarluwar-Ruwe Plan: Caring for Ngarrindjeri Sea Country and Culture (the 'NNYR Plan') stating the Ngarrindjeri Vision for Country

Our Lands, Our Waters, Our People, All Living Things are connected. We implore people to respect our Ruwe (Country) as it was created in the Kaldowinyeri (the Creation). We long for sparkling, clean waters, healthy land and people and all living things. We long for the Yarluwar-Ruwe (Sea Country) of our ancestors. Our vision is all people Caring, Sharing, Knowing and Respecting the lands, the waters and all living things.

After lengthy negotiations with the South Australian Government entered into the Kungun Ngarrindjeri Yunnan Agreement: Listen to Ngarrindjeri Speaking Agreement in 2009.

==== Native title ====
The native title rights and interests of the Ngarrindjeri people were recognised in Ngarrindjeri and Others Native Title Claim on 14 December 2017. The determination granted the Ngarrindjeri people rights including the right to access and move around the Native Title Land, hunt, fish and gather, share and exchange, use Natural Water Resources, cook and light fires for ceremonial purposes, engage in cultural activities and protect cultural sites. All waterways and several parcels of land within Clayton Bay are within Native Title legislation with any vegetation clearance or development requiring approval through the Registered Native Title Body Corporate.

=== European history ===
In 1829, Governor Darling commissioned Captain Charles Sturt to follow the Murrumbidgee, which had been discovered by Hume and Hovell. On 3 November 1829, Sturt left Sydney to assume command of the expedition that eventually turned itself into the famous Murray River Voyage. On 26 December 1829, his team assembled a 25-foot whaleboat and built a log skiff for carrying stores and only two oars. This work was supervised by a carpenter, named Mr Clayton. The boat party departed from the Lachlan River on 7 January 1830. The crew, besides Sturt and Macleay included soldiers, Harris, Hopkinson, and Frasier and convicts, Mulholland, Macnamee, and Clayton.

In 1830 the first exploratory expedition reached the Ngarrindjeri lands and Sturt and crew noted Ngarrindjeri were already familiar with firearms. Ngarrindjeri told them that the ocean was nearby and Sturt sailed into a lake which Sturt named Alexandrina. Around 9 February 1830, Sturt sighted seagulls. A few days later, they found the point where the Murray flowed into the sea.

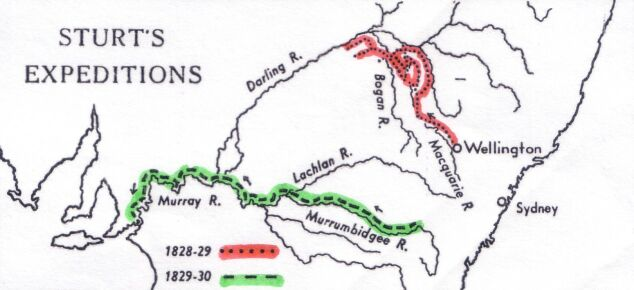
Early expeditions of Sturt

In the 1840s, Dr John Rankine operated his own ferry service from the Clayton Bay to Hindmarsh Island, mainly transporting his sheep and workers and called 'Rankine's Ferry.' The town of Clayton was later named by Governor MacDonnell in 1858. Land allotments were offered for sale in 1859 in the area informally known as 'Old Clayton.' Clayton Bay was subdivided as a settlement in 1859 and a store, post office and a few dwellings were established. In 1969, the Clayton subdivision was established and other developments north of Alexandrina Drive, were developed between 1985 and 2009 creating the current town. A well-known yabby restaurant operated from 1974 until approximately 2009.

Strategically, Clayton Bay is an important place as the channel separating it from Hindmarsh Island is at its narrowest. The 2000s Australian drought arose from very low flows to the Lower Murray (over Lock 1) resulting in the lowest water levels in over 90 years of records. The lowest water levels during the extreme low flow period were reached in April 2009, and represented a 64% and 73% reduction in the volume of Lakes Alexandrina and Albert respectively. The low water levels and inflows meant there was no outflow from the lake system during the extreme low flow period. During this period the lake levels fell below mean sea level (approximately +0.2 m AHD) downstream of the barrages, reversing the usual positive hydraulic gradient from the lake to the sea. The seawater intrusion, lack of flushing, evapoconcentration and increased resuspension resulted in severe water quality impacts Exposure and oxidation of acid sulfate soils due to falling water levels from 2007 to 2009 in the Lower River and Lower Lakes also resulted in acidification of soils, lake and groundwater. Large scale engineering interventions were undertaken to prevent further acidification, including constructions at Clayton Bay and pumping of water to prevent exposure and acidification of Lake Albert. Management of acidification in the Lower Lakes was also undertaken using aerial limestone dosing. The South Australian government erected a barrage (known as a restrictor flow bund) at Clayton Bay to stop the flow of Lake Alexandrina waters towards the mouth of the Murray River The River, Lakes and Coorong Action Group (chaired by Prof. Diane Bell and including Henry and Gloria Jones) vigorously campaigned for the removal of the 'Clayton regulator' to restore water flows. The regulator was removed in 2011.

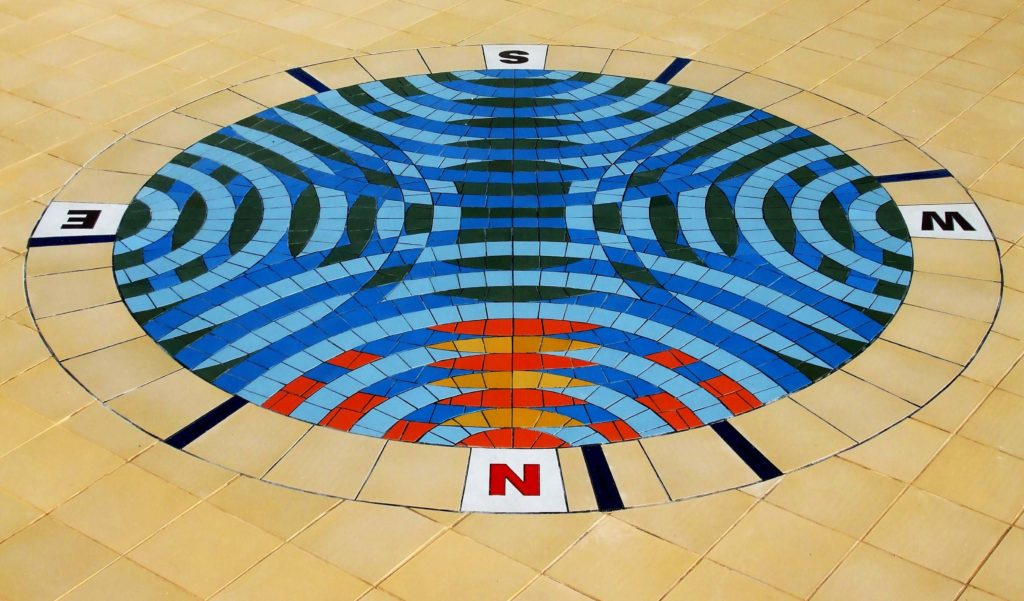
Jones' Lookout, Clayton Bay, Artwork by Michael Tye

Jones' Lookout (named after Henry Jones, local fisherman and environmentalist) was opened in 2009 and is located on the concrete plinth where a former water tower once stood on a clifftop. The mosaic design by artist, Michael Tye consists of a compass rose formed by intersecting ripples. The tiles used for the mosaic are hand-cut, vitrified porcelain tiles, surrounded by tiling of unglazed quarry tiles. The mosaic is a compass made of intersecting ripples of mainly blue tiles, with the colours at the north point depicting sunset on the water. Each of the compass points names a key location in the direction and their distances from Clayton Bay, and from the platform there are views of Lake Alexandrina and the Lower Lakes. North point is emphasised by the colours of sunset on the water. The work also includes swamp hen footprints to an area of concrete that borders the tiling (the work was commissioned during the 2000s Australian Drought when water levels were extremely low and the purple swamp hen (Porphyrio melanotus) disappeared from the area, leaving nothing but footprints).

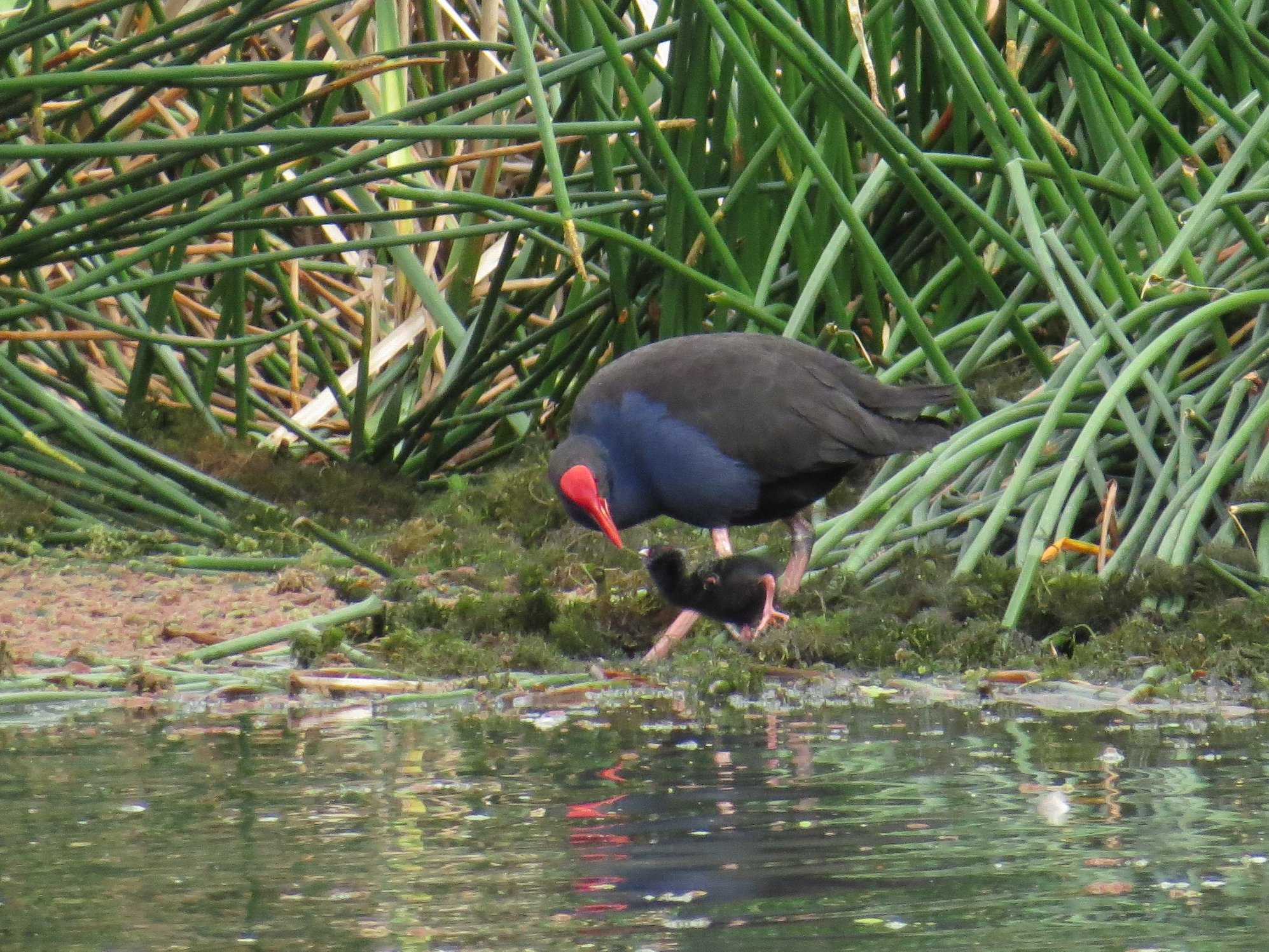
Purple Swamphen (South Australia)(Porphyrio melanotus)

== Environmental threats and action ==
Clayton Bay is part of an internationally significant Ramsar wetland area and a highly fragile ecological setting with Indigenous cultural heritage sites. The wetlands contribute to the filtration and quality of water flowing into the Lower Lakes.

Serious environmental threats are posed by:

- climate change,
- water extraction,
- drought,
- reedbed clearing, reduction or dispersal of reedbeds (i.e. creating gaps between reedbeds),
- touristic activities (e.g. unsustainable numbers of tourists, wakeboarding, waterskiing, jet skis, powerboats),
- human intrusions and activity,
- noise and light pollution,
- vehicular use,
- introduction of contaminants,
- introduced vegetation (e.g. esp. kikuyu grass and similar invasive species into reed beds),
- the removal of native vegetation, and
- Introduced and feral animals.

The beauty of the area attracts numerous tourists whose numbers and activities may not be able to be sustained. Inappropriate human activities causing environmental damage to the wetlands are difficult to regulate as there are several public boat ramps in the town and the Alexandrina Council have leased areas adjacent to the wetlands to touristic, for profit bodies.

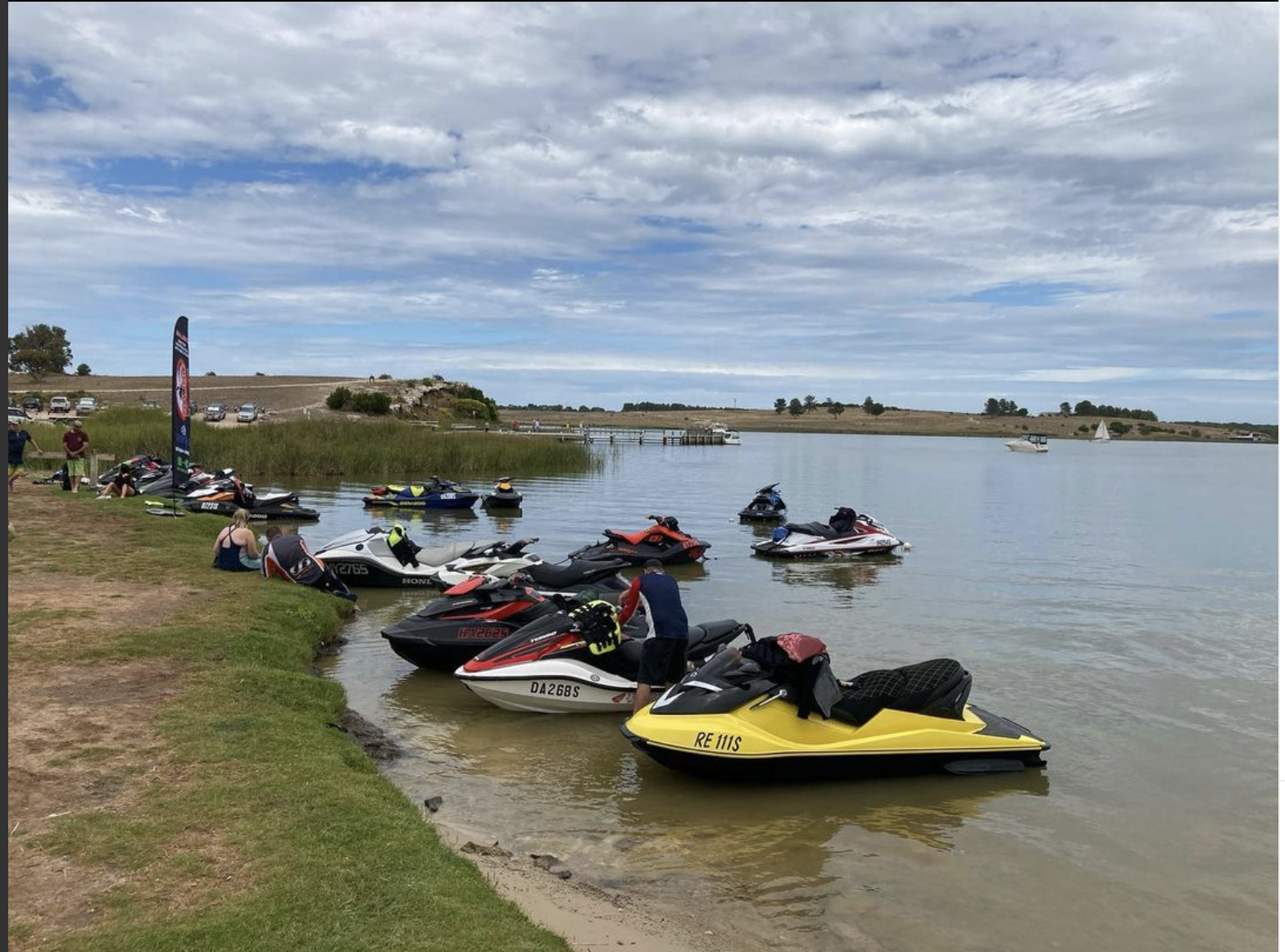
Environmental degradation, Ramsar Wetlands, Use of Jet Skis, Clayton Bay

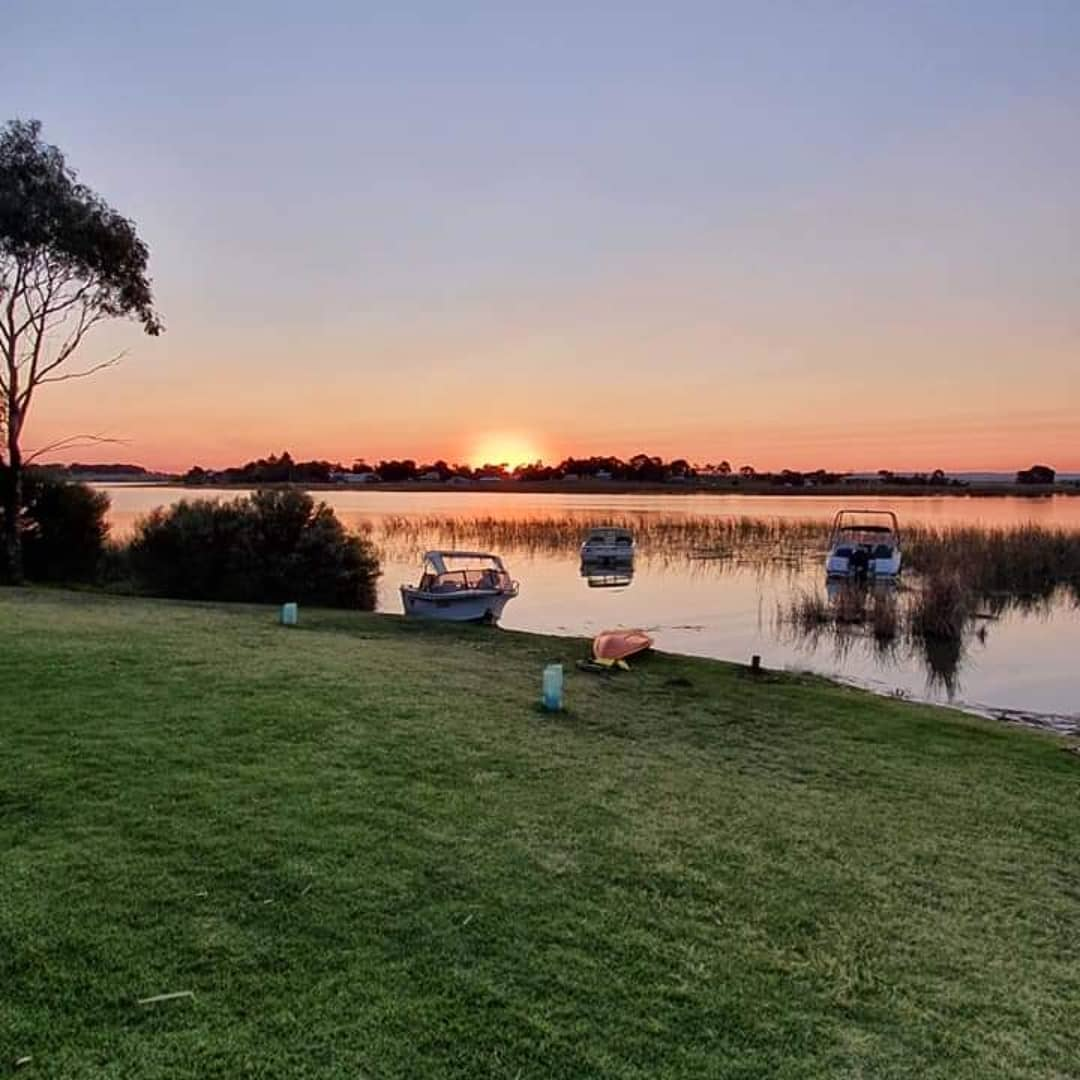
Reed clearing and power boats, Ramsar Wetlands Area, Clayton Bay Riverside Holiday Park

European Carp introduced to the Murray-Darling Basin in the 1920s pose a major threat. An invasive widespread fish species, they are highly adaptable and have biological features that allow populations to increase rapidly. Carp contribute to environmental degradation through reduction in water quality, river bank damage and may contribute to algae blooms. The increased spread of carp and its impact on freshwater habitat has come at the expense of native fish species and aquatic vegetation. Australian scientists have determined that using the naturally occurring carp herpesvirus (Cyprinid herpesvirus-3: CyHV-3, sometimes referred to as KHV) a biological control agent could significantly reduce the number of carp. The combination of a biological control mechanism, and an improved environmental flow regime may impact the likelihood of a positive future for native fish, although there is still ongoing debates. European carp are considered a pest species and highly prevalent at Clayton Bay. Carp if caught must not be returned to it to the water, be destroyed and disposed of.

River regulation, water extraction and droughts have reduced the total volume of water available resulting in a substantial decline in the waterways. Work by Ngarrindjeri Native Title holders, local residents and the Alexandrina Council attempt to balance touristic activities, strongly promoting ecotourism practices, seeking to preserve and protect cultural heritage sites, prevent inappropriate developments and activities and preserve and rehabilitate the environment, increase wetland areas, maintain and work to increase water flows along the catchment and increase water quality.

Many Clayton Bay residents have adopted stewardship environmental roles and are involved in:

- citizen science including annual bird and amphibian counts, vegetation surveys, temperature and wind speed measurements, astronomical observations,
- advocating and active involvement in the preservation, restoration and revitalization of the wetlands,
- turtle rescue programs,
- overseeing the preservation of remnant vegetation,
- revegetation programs
- interventions to decrease the spread of Australian tubeworm (Ficopomatus enigmaticus),
- the development of walking trails and wetland boardwalks,
- bird and fauna rescue and return to native habitats,
- protecting the breeding grounds of Eastern long-necked turtles (Chelodina longicollis) which are vulnerable from recreational activity, noise, environmental degradation, infestations of Australian tubeworm (Ficopomatus enigmaticus) and predators including foxes and cats. (Note: the Alexandrina Council offer cat traps to deal with issues arising from feral or unidentified cats).
- a program to raise nationally threatened Southern Bell frogs (Ranoidea raniformis) in captivity to be released back into the wetlands operates within the town.
- local seed bank and land care programs, and
- adopting a dark sky policies in collaboration with the Alexandrina Council (the town has only five street lights operating).Clayton Bay Lighting

== Notable residents ==
- Annabelle Collett(Artist)
- Deane Fergie (Anthropologist)
- Elizabeth Grant (Architect/Anthropologist)
- Gloria Jones (Environmentalist/Restaurateur/Fisherman/Activist)
- Henry Jones (Environmentalist/Fisherman/Activist)
- Rob Lucas (Anthropologist)

== Sources ==
- Berndt, Ronald Murray; Berndt, Catherine Helen; Stanton, John E. (1993). A World that was: The Yaraldi of the Murray River and the Lakes, South Australia. University of British Columbia UBC Press. ISBN 978-0-774-80478-3.
- Pate, F Donald (2006). "Hunter-gatherer social complexity at Roonka Flat, South Australia" (PDF). In Bruno, David; Barker, Bryce; McNiven, Ian J (eds.). Social Archaeology of Australian Indigenous Societies. Aboriginal Studies Press. pp. 226–241. Archived from the original (PDF) on 3 April 2018.
- Simons, M. (2003). The Meeting of the Waters: The Hindmarsh Island Affair. Sydney: Hodder Headline. ISBN 0-7336-1348-9.
