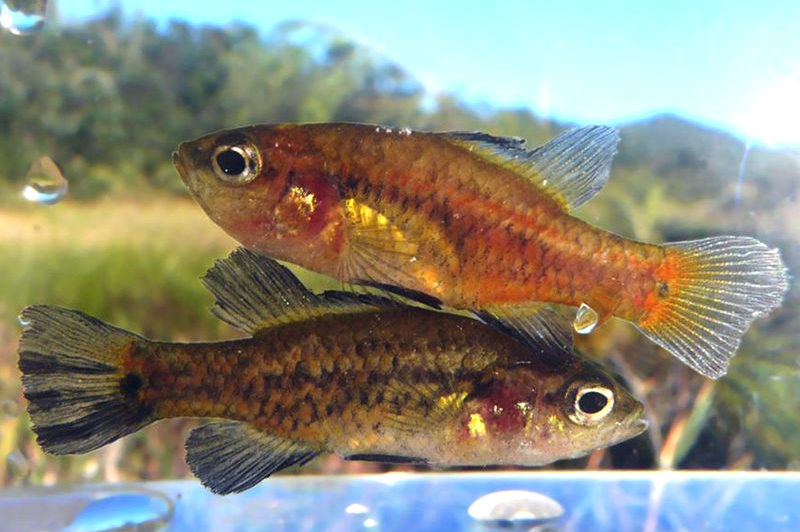

Conservation status
- Endangered (IUCN 3.1)

Scientific classification
- Kingdom: Animalia
- Phylum: Chordata
- Class: Actinopterygii
- Order: Centrarchiformes
- Family: Percichthyidae
- Genus: Nannoperca
- Species: N. oxleyana

Binomial name
- Nannoperca oxleyana Whitley, 1940

= Nannoperca oxleyana =

Oxleyan pygmy perch

Species of ray-finned fish

Nannoperca oxleyana, commonly known as the Oxleyan pygmy perch, is a species of temperate perch endemic to Australia. It occurs in the coastal drainages of eastern Australia, being found in dune lakes, ponds, creeks, and swamps with plentiful vegetation to provide shelter. The waters in which it lives are often dark and acidic. It preys upon aquatic insects and their larvae, as well as planktonic crustaceans and even algae. This species can reach 7.5 cm (3.0 in) SL, though most do not exceed 4 cm (1.6 in). It can also be found in the aquarium trade.
