= Nannoperca =

- Photos by Jim Owens; Western pygmy perch (N. vittata) male (top) and female (bottom)

Scientific classification
- Kingdom: Animalia
- Phylum: Chordata
- Class: Actinopterygii
- Order: Centrarchiformes
- Family: Percichthyidae
- Genus: Nannoperca; Günther, 1861

Type species
- Nannoperca australis Günther, 1861

Synonyms
- Microperca Castelnau, 1872; Paradules Klunzinger, 1872; Edelia Castelnau, 1873; Percamia Bleeker, 1876

Genus of ray-finned fishes

Nannoperca or pygmy perch is a genus of temperate perches endemic to freshwater systems of Australia.

== Species ==
The currently recognized species in this genus are:

- Nannoperca australis Günther, 1861 (Southern pygmy perch)
- Nannoperca obscura (Klunzinger, 1872) (Yarra pygmy perch)
- Nannoperca oxleyana Whitley, 1940 (Oxleyan pygmy perch)
- Nannoperca pygmaea D. L. Morgan, Beatty & M. Adams, 2013 (little pygmy perch)
- Nannoperca variegata Kuiter & G. R. Allen, 1986 (golden pygmy perch)
- Nannoperca vittata (Castelnau, 1873) (western pygmy perch)
- Balston's pygmy perch, previously Nannoperca balstoni, has now been renamed Nannatherina balstoni.
