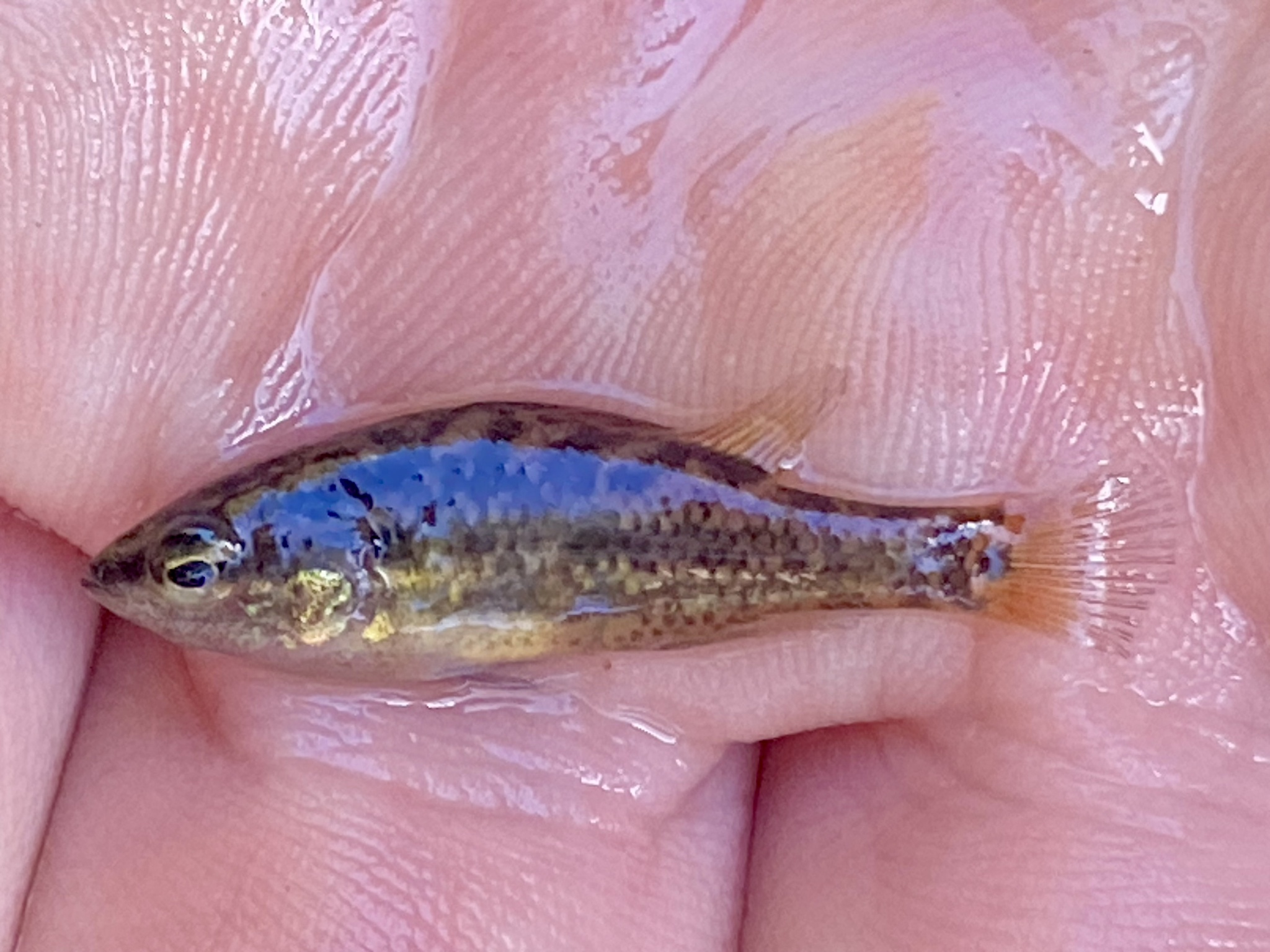

Conservation status
- Endangered (IUCN 3.1)

Scientific classification
- Kingdom: Animalia
- Phylum: Chordata
- Class: Actinopterygii
- Order: Centrarchiformes
- Family: Percichthyidae
- Genus: Nannoperca
- Species: N. pygmaea

Binomial name
- Nannoperca pygmaea D. L. Morgan, Beatty & M. Adams, 2013

= Little pygmy perch =

Species of ray-finned fish

The little pygmy perch (Nannoperca pygmaea) is a freshwater species of ray finned fish, a temperate perch from the family Percichthyidae that is endemic to south-western Western Australia. It is known from just four sites in the Denmark catchment. It is found in tannin stained, acidic and shallow streams in woodland dominated by Melaleuca rhaphiophylla.
