= Golden pygmy perch =

Conservation status
- Endangered (IUCN 3.1)

Scientific classification
- Kingdom: Animalia
- Phylum: Chordata
- Class: Actinopterygii
- Order: Centrarchiformes
- Family: Percichthyidae
- Genus: Nannoperca
- Species: N. variegata

Binomial name
- Nannoperca variegata Kuiter & G. R. Allen, 1986

Species of ray-finned fish

The golden pygmy perch (Nannoperca variegata) is a species of temperate perch endemic to Australia, where it is found in both Ewens Ponds and Deep Creek, South Australia, and several tributaries of the Glenelg River in Victoria. It prefers flowing water of ponds or small streams, generally being more commonly found in the streams that connect to the ponds, with plentiful vegetation or debris to provide shelter. It preys on extremely small crustaceans and aquatic insects. This species can reach 6.5 cm (2.6 in) SL. It can also be found in the aquarium trade.
