= Lawari Conservation Park =

Protected area in South Australia

- IUCN category III (natural monument or feature)
- Location within South Australia
- Location: South Australia
- Nearest city: Hindmarsh Island
- Coordinates: 35°31′18″S 138°54′07″E
- Area: 1.058 km^{2} (0.408 sq mi)
- Established: 21 March 2017
- Governing body: Department for Environment and Water

Lawari Conservation Park is a protected area in the Australian state of South Australia in the gazetted locality of Hindmarsh Island located at the eastern end of the island of the same name.

It was proclaimed under the National Parks and Wildlife Act 1972 on 21 March 2017 in respect to a number of parcels of land in the cadastral unit of the Hundred of Nangkita at the eastern end of Hindmarsh Island. The conservation park consists of “two former grazing properties purchased with assistance” from the Australian government's National Reserve System in 2001 originally for the purpose of extending the Coorong National Park onto Hindmarsh Island. As of April 2017, it covered an area of 1.058 square kilometres (0.408 sq mi).

An announcement made on 19 April 2017 by Ian Hunter, the Minister for Sustainability, Environment & Conservation in the South Australian government described the conservation park as follows:

South Australia has proclaimed a new 1058-hectare conservation park at the eastern end of Hindmarsh Island, within an area of wetlands that support many threatened fish and water bird species. … The Lawari Conservation Park supports three native fauna species of national conservation significance, and a further 30 fauna and one flora species at the state level, including the Far Eastern Curlew and Cape Barren Goose.

The conservation park is located within the boundaries of the Ramsar site known as the Coorong and Lakes Alexandrina and Albert Wetland and shares a boundary with the Coorong National Park on its south-eastern side.

The conservation park is classified as an IUCN Category III protected area.

== See also ==
- Protected areas of South Australia
