= Yarra pygmy perch =

Conservation status
- Endangered (IUCN 3.1)

Scientific classification
- Kingdom: Animalia
- Phylum: Chordata
- Class: Actinopterygii
- Division: Teleostei
- Order: Centrarchiformes
- Family: Percichthyidae
- Genus: Nannoperca
- Species: N. obscura

Binomial name
- Nannoperca obscura (Klunzinger, 1872)

Synonyms
- Paradules obscura Klunzinger, 1872; Edelia obscura (Klunzinger, 1872); Microperca yarrae Castelnau, 1872

Species of fish endemic to southeastern Australia

The Yarra pygmy perch (Nannoperca obscura) is a species of temperate perch that is endemic to southeastern Australia.

== Distribution ==
Nannoperca obscura occurs in the coastal drainages of southeastern Australia, preferring streams and lakes with plentiful vegetation and flowing water. It is found only in the southeastern portion of South Australia south of Adelaide, and extending along southern Victoria some way past Melbourne.

The species was first reported in the lower Murray reaches in South Australia in 2002. However, the 2008 millennium drought caused local extinction in the Murray-Darling basin, with only a few individuals kept in private dams.

== Description and behaviour ==
This species can reach a total length of 7.5 cm (3.0 in), though most only reach about 5 cm (2.0 in). Yarra pygmy perch are olive-green above, greenish-brown on the sides, and yellowish-white below, with chevron-shaped markings on rear half of the body. It can also be found in the aquarium trade.

It feeds on small insects and their larvae, as well as small crustaceans.

== Conservation status and measures ==
The Yarra pygmy perch was classed as an endangered species on the IUCN Red List in 2019. In Australia, it is classed as vulnerable under the federal EPBC Act and Victoria's Flora and Fauna Guarantee Act 1988, and critically endangered on the Action Plan for South Australian Freshwater Fishes (2009).

In November 2023, around 1,000 genetically-tested fish were release into enclosures near Hindmarsh Island in the lower Murray, to allow for three weeks of acclimatisation before being released into the wild in the river. The conservation project was undertaken by scientist at Adelaide and Flinders universities as well as the Murraylands and Riverland Landscape Board, with assistance from community and school student volunteers.
