= Western pygmy perch =

- Male, showing breeding colors
- Female, showing breeding colors

Conservation status
- Vulnerable (IUCN 3.1)

Scientific classification
- Kingdom: Animalia
- Phylum: Chordata
- Class: Actinopterygii
- Order: Centrarchiformes
- Family: Percichthyidae
- Genus: Nannoperca
- Species: N. vittata

Binomial name
- Nannoperca vittata (Castelnau, 1873)
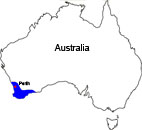
- Beira range

Synonyms
- Edelia vittata Castelnau, 1873

Species of fish

The western pygmy perch (Nannoperca vittata) is a species of temperate perch endemic to southwestern Australia.

== Description ==
The Western pygmy perch is a small fish with an olive, brown and green mottled body with two orange stripes along the flanks. In the breeding season the males develop brighter colouration with golden mottling along the flanks, a reddish-orange abdomen and the fins darken. The females develop a bluish colour when breeding. It can reach 8 cm (3.1 in) TL.

== Distribution ==
The Western pygmy perch is endemic to the south-western coastal drainages of Western Australia. Its range extends from the Waychinicup River east of Albany to the Arrowsmith River 300 kilometres (190 miles) north of Perth. It occurs in the majority of the river drainages within its range, as well as in lakes near the south coast.

== Habitat and biology ==
The Western pygmy perch is found predominantly in lakes, streams, and swamps, and can withstand a degree of brackishness. They have a preference for living among vegetation in the shallows around the water perimeter, and acclimatise readily to a range of water temperatures from almost 0 to 25 °C. Pygmy perch are egg layers. They produce eggs singly, laying 12 to 15 over a period of up to three hours. During the breeding season (July to November), both sexes become noticeably more colorful. The eggs measure around 1.2 mm and are slightly adhesive, which allows them to cling to submerged plants, rocks, or debris. Spawning usually occurs in the latter part of the morning. Hatching occurs after around three days from laying. The 3-mm larvae look quite different from juveniles of the species and have no mouth for several days, but are recognizably perch-like after around 27 to 30 days. This species is mainly carnivorous, they eat various dipteran larvae, including mosquitos, ostracods, and copepods, and small quantities of algae, and are adept at taking mosquitoes from the surface of the water. They attain sexual maturity at one year old, and can live as long as 5 years.

Western pygmy perch larva

== Uses ==
Pygmy perch may be safely kept in an aquarium along with tropical fish. They are considered safe with tadpoles, so are used in frog ponds to control mosquito larvae.
