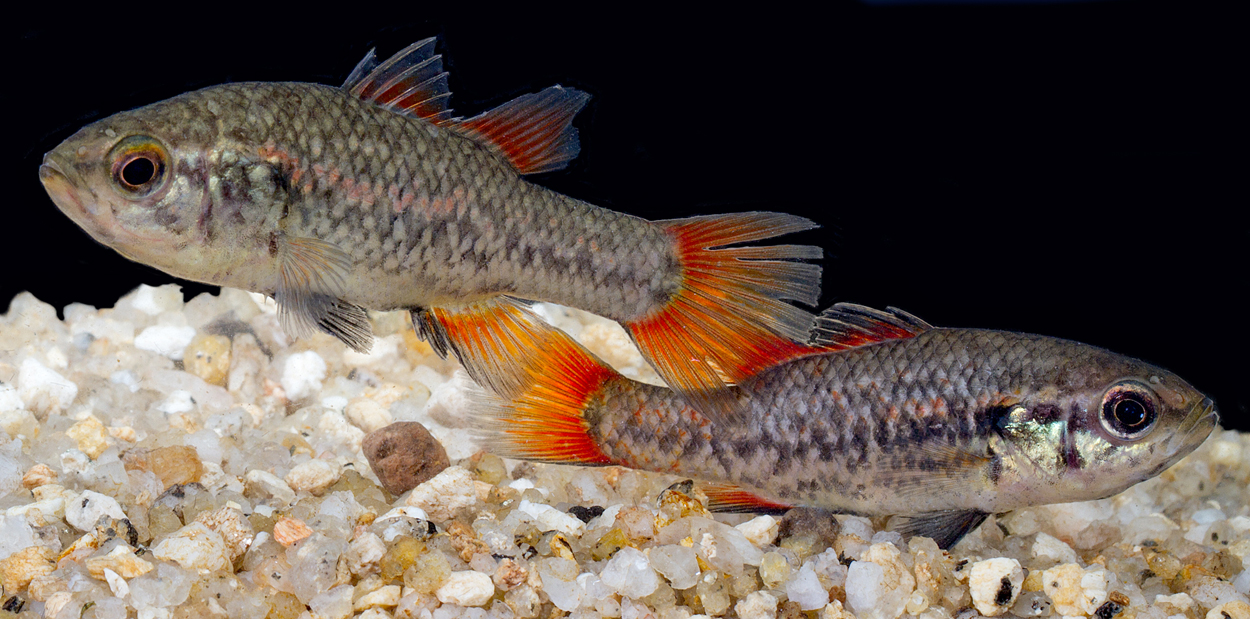

Conservation status
- Near Threatened (IUCN 3.1)

Scientific classification
- Kingdom: Animalia
- Phylum: Chordata
- Class: Actinopterygii
- Order: Centrarchiformes
- Family: Percichthyidae
- Genus: Nannoperca
- Species: N. australis

Binomial name
- Nannoperca australis Günther, 1861

Synonyms
- Paradules leetus Klunzinger, 1872; Nannoperca riverinae Macleay, 1881; Microperca tasmaniae Johnston, 1883; Nannoperca australis flindersi E.O.G. Scott, 1971

= Southern pygmy perch =

Species of fish

The southern pygmy perch (Nannoperca australis), also known as the Tasmanian pygmy perch, is a species of freshwater ray-finned fish from the temperate perch family Percichthyidae, native to southeastern Australia and Tasmania.

== Description ==
The southern pygmy perch has an oblong and moderately compressed body with a convex dorsal profile and a straight ventral profile. It has a large head the top of which bulges slightly and a blunt snout. It has a slightly oblique, terminal mouth which is protractile with the maxilla reaching to a level near the centre of the eye. There are thin bands of villiform teeth on the jaws and the roof of the mouth. There is a lateral line made up of an irregular series of pored scales. The dorsal fin has 7-9 spines in its front part, separated from the rear part by a deep notch, the rear part contains 7-10 soft rays. The anal fin is similar in shape to the soft part of the dorsal fin and has 3 spines and 7-8 soft rays. The large caudal fin is rounded.

They are variable in colour, the colour apparently being determined by their environment and can be pale cream through to greenish-brown, with paler underparts. They can also show irregular markings on the flanks such as dark spotting or horizontal stripes. In the breeding season the males are brighter as their dorsal, anal and caudal fins develop a red colour and have black margins and the pelvic fins and the area around the anus become black. These fish attain a maximum total length of 8 centimetres (3.1 in) but are more commonly recorded at standard lengths of around 6 centimetres (2.4 in).

== Distribution ==
Southern pygmy perch are endemic to temperate rivers systems in southeastern Australia, especially the Murray-Murrumbidgee river system from Brinagagee near Darlington Point in New South Wales, in Victoria, west to Ewens Ponds in South Australia. They also occur on Flinders Island and on King Island in the Bass Strait and in the northward draining rivers in Tasmania.

== Habitat and biology ==
Southern pygmy perch are found in a wide variety of freshwater habitats so long as they have aquatic vegetation. They can be found in both still or slow-flowing waters and they have been recorded in low current streams, lakes, billabongs, ditches, impoundments, swamps and ephemeral wetlands. In all of these habitat they prefer the vegetated marginal areas.

It is a mainly carnivorous species with diet mostly consisting of small invertebrates such as mosquito larvae and other aquatic insects, as well as Daphnia and other crustaceans. As they mature they prey on larger insects including mayflies but their small mouth means that they do not consume many other fishes.

Southern pygmy perch attain sexual maturity during the first year after hatching, mature males are mature at about 30 millimetres (1.2 in) and females at around 33 millimetres (1.3 in). The breeding season runs from the late winter into the early spring once the water temperatures rise above 16 °C (61 °F). Breeding males are territorial and defend a small area of water from other males. The female lays small clutches of eggs in the aquatic vegetation or onto the riverbed within the male's territory. These hatch into larvae of 3-4mm in length 2-4 days after fertilisation.

== Conservation ==
=== Status ===
The Millennium drought in the early 2000s affected many species, including the southern pygmy perch. As of 1995 the Southern pygmy perch was relatively common in Tasmania. The fish was once abundant in South Australia, and widespread in New South Wales and in coastal Victoria.

By 2007 it had largely been extirpated from New South Wales, with only three known locations where it was still found: in the Lachlan River catchment, north of Yass; as near Holbrook, and Albury (Tumbarumba?). In 2021 a fourth population was found in the Ooolong Creek in the town of Dalton, by two teenagers.

As of 2007 the fish was rare in the Murray River catchment of Victoria, and rare and threatened in South Australia. The species was extirpated in the lower Murray in South Australia during the Millennium Drought.

Other reasons for the decline and continuing threats to this species include invasive alien fish species such as eastern mosquitofish (which feed on their eggs and compete for food and territories), brown trout, Eurasian carp and European perch ("redfins"), as well as cold water pollution, and habitat fragmentation and destruction.

The IUCN assessed the conservation status of this species as Near Threatened in 2019.

The SPRAT database has two separate pages for the species:

1. Nannoperca australis — Southern Pygmy Perch, Collundera
2. Nannoperca australis Murray-Darling Basin lineage — Southern Pygmy Perch (Murray-Darling Basin lineage)

The first shows that it is not listed under the (national) EPBC Act, but is listed as Endangered under the Fisheries Management Act 1994 (NSW) in New South Wales, August 2024 list, and in South Australia is listed as Endangered on the state's "Action Plan for South Australian Freshwater Fishes 2009".

The second type, the Murray-Darling Basin lineage, was listed as Vulnerable under the EPBC Act as well as under the Victorian Flora and Fauna Guarantee Act 1988, March 2025 list. It also appears on the NSW Department of Primary Industries and Regional Development list of threatened species (2024).

=== Measures ===
The Department of Primary Industries in New South Wales has undertaken a captive breeding programme for this species.

Conservation Advice for the Murray-Darling Basin lineage provided by the Threatened Species Scientific Committee in 2020 was approved by the Minister and published in 2021.

In August 2023, a group of volunteers working with OzFish Unlimited and the local council undertook the translocation of 200 fish to Oolong Creek, to boost the population there.

In the waters of the lower Murray in South Australia, volunteer groups collected fish when they were still naturally occurring there before the waters receded, and placed into dams. In 2025 scientists at Adelaide University and CSIRO have been studying the tiny otoliths of the fish, which provide information about its growth. In September 2025 hundreds of fish were released into a private marina on the shores of the Murray River at Clayton Bay on Lake Alexandrina, hoping to reintroduce the species to the area. The fish releases are funded by the Coorong, Lower Lakes and Murray Mouth (CLLMM) Research Centre,

== Taxonomy ==
The Southern pygmy perch was first formally described in 1861 by Albert Günther with the type locality given as the Murray River. Molecular studies have shown that there are two cryptic species within Nannoperca australis one from the eastern coastal streams and the other from the Murray–Darling basin and the western coastal streams.

== Aquarium ==
The Southern pygmy perch is in the aquarium trade within Australia, where it is kept in cold water aquaria and in ponds.
