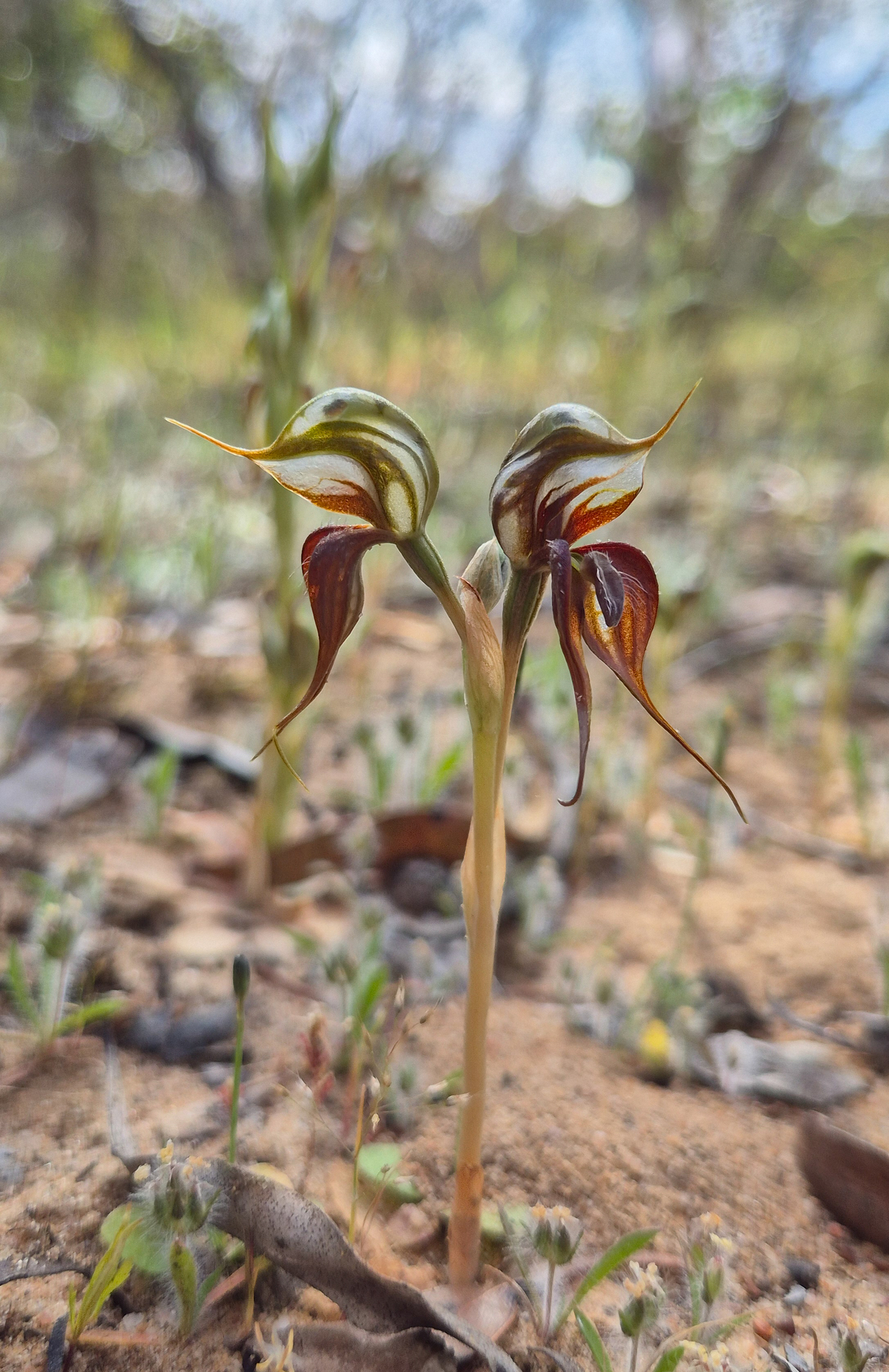

Conservation status
- Vulnerable (EPBC Act)

Scientific classification
- Kingdom: Plantae
- Clade: Embryophytes
- Clade: Tracheophytes
- Clade: Angiosperms
- Clade: Monocots
- Order: Asparagales
- Family: Orchidaceae
- Subfamily: Orchidoideae
- Tribe: Cranichideae
- Genus: Pterostylis
- Species: P. arenicola

Binomial name
- Pterostylis arenicola M.A.Clem. & J.Stewart

Synonyms
- Oligochaetochilus arenicola (M.A.Clem. & J.Stewart) Szlach.; Pterostylis arenicola D.L.Jones nom. inval.; Pterostylis boormanii auct. non Rupp: Weber, J.Z. & Bates, R. in Jessop, J.P. & Toelken, H.R. (ed.) (1986); Pterostylis squamata auct. non R.Br.: Rogers, R.S. in Black, J.M. (1943)

= Pterostylis arenicola =

Sandhill rustyhood

Species of orchid

Pterostylis arenicola, commonly known as sandhill rustyhood is a plant in the orchid family Orchidaceae and is endemic to South Australia. It has a rosette of leaves near its base and up to ten reddish-brown and white flowers with a dark brown, insect-like labellum. Its distribution is now restricted to areas around Lake Alexandrina.

== Description ==
Pterostylis arenicola is a terrestrial, perennial, deciduous, herb with an underground tuber and which only occurs as solitary plants. It has a rosette of between eight and twelve leaves at the base of the flowering spike. The leaves are 15–30 mm (0.6–1 in) long and 6–12 mm (0.2–0.5 in) wide and wither as the flowers develop. Up to ten dark brown and translucent white flowers 30–35 mm (1.2–1.4 in) long and 10–12 mm (0.4–0.5 in) wide are borne on a flowering spike which elongates to 100–250 mm (4–10 in) tall as the flowers develop. The dorsal sepal and petals form a hood called the "galea" over the column with the dorsal sepal having a narrow tip 9–12 mm (0.4–0.5 in) long. The lateral sepals are much wider than the galea, have densely hairy edges and taper suddenly to narrow, thread-like tips 10–20 mm (0.4–0.8 in) long which spread apart from each other. The labellum is dark brown, fleshy and insect-like, 5–7 mm (0.2–0.3 in) long and about 2 mm (0.08 in) wide. The centre of the labellum has a channel and the edges have bristly hairs up to 3 mm (0.1 in). Flowering occurs from August to October.

== Taxonomy and naming ==
Pterostylis arenicola was first formally described in 1989 by Mark Clements and Joyce Stewart from a specimen collected south of Tailem Bend and the description was published in Australian Orchid Research. The specific epithet (arenicola) is derived from the Latin words arena meaning "sand" and -cola meaning "dweller".

== Distribution and habitat ==
Sandhill rustyhood is only known from populations at Grange in the Adelaide metropolitan area, Tailem Bend, Coorong National Park, Meningie and Narrung Peninsula. It is locally common in sandy soil on coloured sand dunes in mallee and Callitris woodland with an understorey of shrub, heath, sedge and grass.

There are records from Victoria but they may not be of this species.

== Ecology ==
Success has been achieved in germinating seeds of P. arenicola in vitro by inoculating them with a mychorrizal fungus.

== Conservation ==
Pterostylis arenicola is listed as 'Vulnerable' under the Australian Government Environment Protection and Biodiversity Conservation Act 1999 and the South Australian National Parks and Wildlife Act 1972. The main threats to the species are weed invasion, grazing and soil disturbance and inappropriate fire regimes.
