= Hindmarsh Island =

Island in South Australia

- Location within South Australia

Geography
- Location: South Australia
- Coordinates: 35°31′S 138°52′E
- Area: 45.5 km^{2} (17.6 sq mi)
- Length: 14.7 km (9.13 mi)
- Width: 6.5 km (4.04 mi)
- Coastline: 43.7 km (27.15 mi)
- Highest elevation: 25 m (82 ft)

Administration
- Australia

Demographics
- Population: 1233~

Hindmarsh Island (Ngarrindjeri: Kumerangk) is an inland river island located in the lower Murray River near the town of Goolwa, South Australia.

The island is a tourist destination, which has increased in popularity since the opening of the Hindmarsh Island bridge in 2001. Hindmarsh Island is 100.1 kilometres (62.2 miles) south east of the Adelaide city centre, around a 1-hour and 15 minute drive.

== History ==
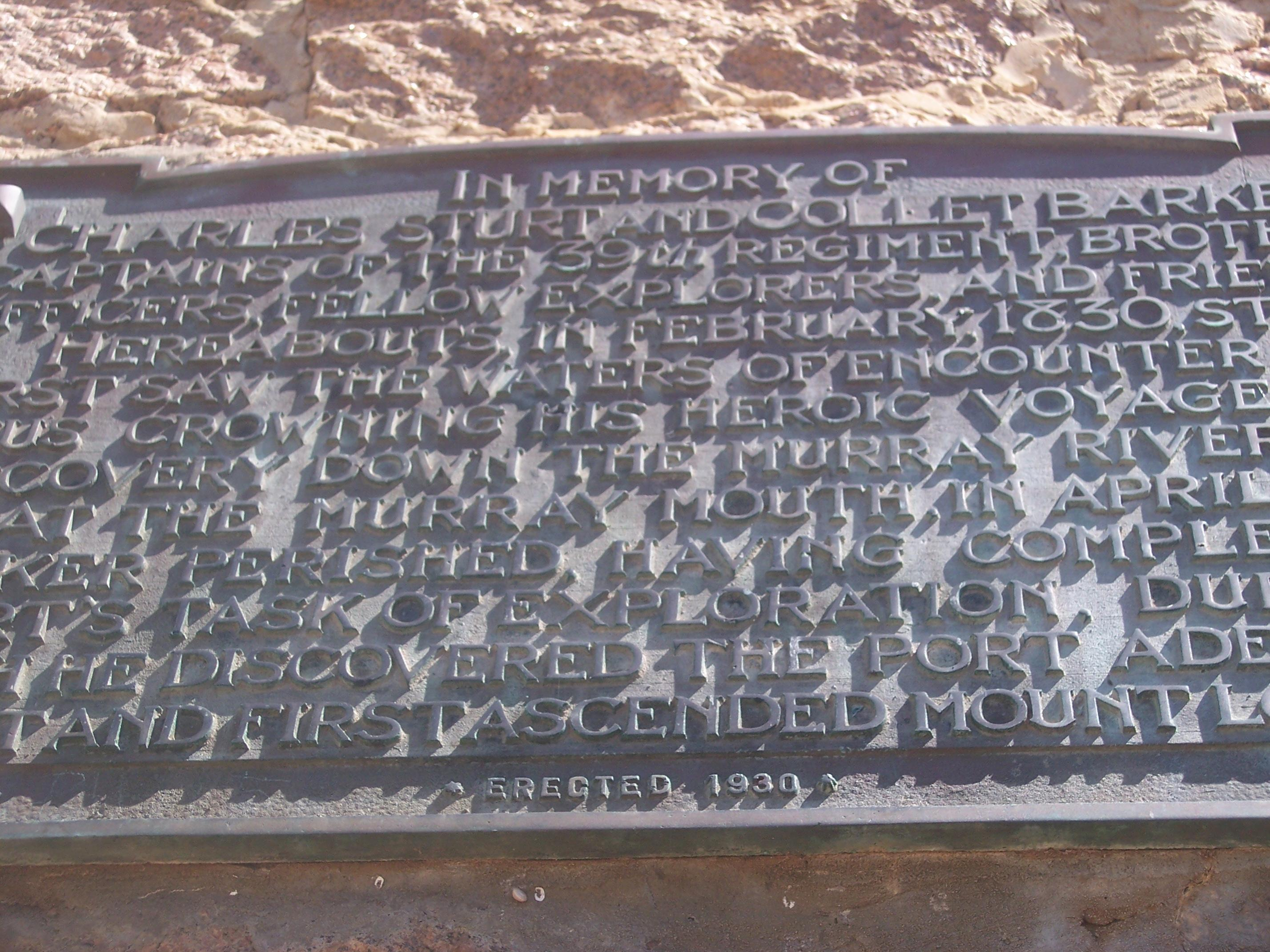
Plaque of a monument dedicated to Charles Sturt and Collet Barker, erected 1930

Prior to European colonisation, the island was occupied by Ngarrindjeri peoples, who know it as Kumarangk.

1830: The first European to set foot on Hindmarsh Island was Captain Charles Sturt. Sturt used the Island as a viewing point and from there he sighted the Murray Mouth.

1831: Captain Collet Barker surveyed the Murray Mouth but was killed by Indigenous Australians after swimming across the mouth.

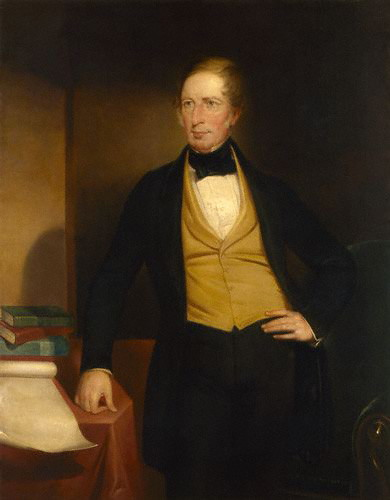
Captain Charles Sturt, first European to set foot on Hindmarsh Island in 1830.

1837: The island was named by Captain John William Dundas Blenkinsop after South Australia's first Governor, Sir John Hindmarsh.

1849: Dr. John Rankine was granted an occupational licence to become the island's first grazier. His nephew James Rankine was an early and longtime settler.

1853: Charles Price purchased section 20 (32 hectares (80 acres)) on the island.

1856: A flour mill was constructed.

1857: A signal mast was erected at Barker Knoll to convey safe passage condition messages to vessels wishing to pass through the mouth.

1858: A public ferry began operations between Goolwa and the island. In the same year the first inter colonial telegraph line passed through the island to link Adelaide with Melbourne.

1861: The cemetery was surveyed.

1880s: Alberto and Selberto Forest were planted.

1868: Hereford cattle and Shropshire sheep arrived in South Australia, when Charles Price introduced them onto the island.

1900: A cheese factory was established by Percy Heggaton.

1914: An experimental barrage was constructed to link Hindmarsh Island with Mundoo Island.

1935: Construction of the permanent barrages took place with the aim of maintaining a consistent water level around the river Port of Goolwa and keeping salt water away from the northern shore, improving agricultural opportunities.

1965: Mains electricity arrived on the island

1970: Little penguins were present on Hindmarsh Island. Today, the colony is extinct.

1985: Approximately 1,405 square kilometres (542 square miles) including the island was listed as a "wetland of international importance" under the Ramsar convention under the name of Coorong and Lakes Alexandrina and Albert Wetland.

2001: Approximately a third of the island, the 10.81 square kilometres (4.17 square miles) Wyndgate property, was added to the Coorong National Park. The Hindmarsh Island Bridge from the mainland is opened.

2005: Coorong Quays Hindmarsh Island boasts the title of the largest freshwater marina in the Southern Hemisphere (formerly The Marina Hindmarsh Island).

Present: Hindmarsh Island today has fresh water on its northern shore and salt water on the southern shores, the waters being separated by a series of barrages.

== The Hindmarsh Island Bridge ==
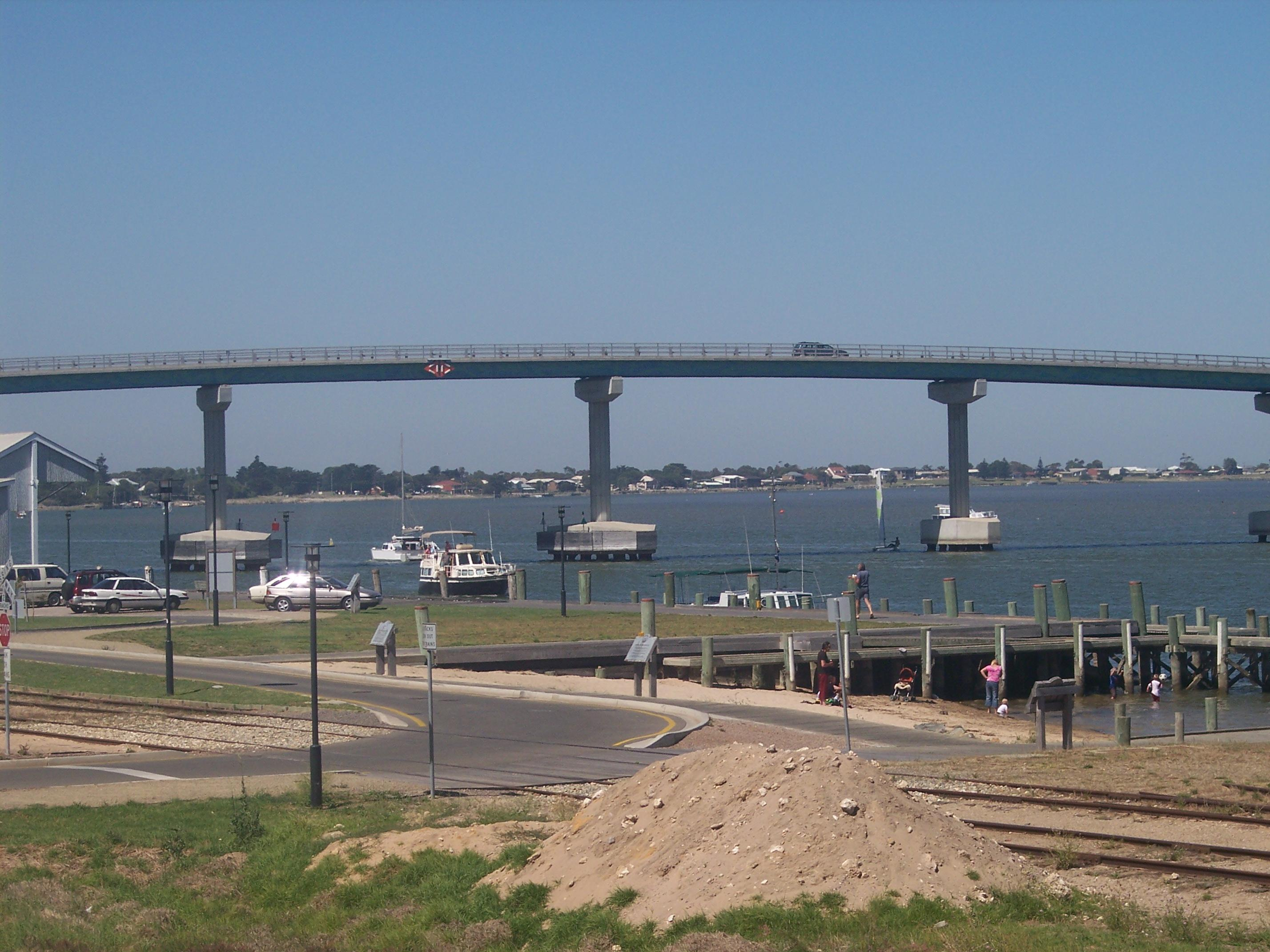
View of the Hindmarsh Island Bridge from the Goolwa wharf

Length: 319 metres (1,047 feet)

Height: 19 metres (62 feet)

Width: 11 metres (36 feet)

Clearance Height: 14 metres (46 feet)

Building Company: Built Environs

Construction Commenced: October 1999

Construction Finished: March 2001

The Hindmarsh Island Bridge linking the island to Goolwa was officially opened on 4 March 2001. The bridge became a focus of national controversy when a group of local Indigenous people (the Ngarrindjeri) and some landowners objected to its construction. It was alleged that the Ngarrindjeri objectors fabricated the cultural significance of the island (the "Secret Women's Business") in order to help fight the development. A later Royal Commission decided that the "Secret Women's Business" was made up. Construction was blocked by the Keating government but given the go-ahead by the Howard government in 1996.

In 2001 a Federal Court Judge, Mr Justice John von Doussa, found in Chapman v Luminis Pty Ltd (No 5) that "the evidence received by the Court on this topic is significantly different to that which was before the Royal Commission. Upon the evidence before this Court I am not satisfied that the restricted women's knowledge was fabricated or that it was not part of genuine Aboriginal tradition". Justice von Doussa found that the nine Ngarrindjeri women who testified about their beliefs were "credible witnesses who genuinely hold the beliefs and recollections expressed by them".

== Geography ==
Typical grassland scene at Hindmarsh Island

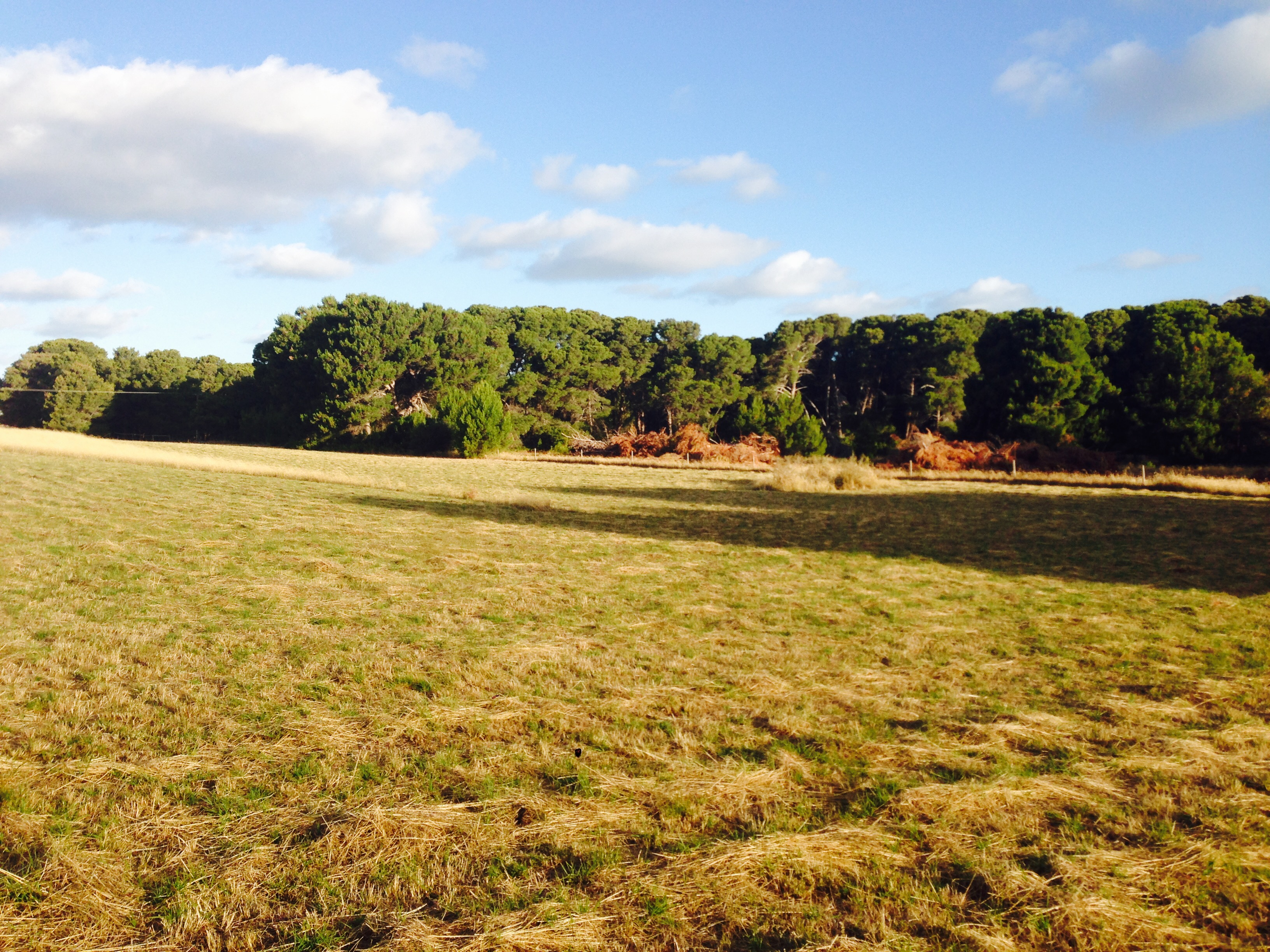
Grassland & Forest scene, located on the northern part of the Island.

Area: 45.5 square kilometres (17.6 square miles)

Coastline: 43.7 kilometres (27.2 miles) (not including marina)

Highest Elevation: 25 metres (82 feet) (35°30'30.28"S 138°49'21.83"E)

Salt Lakes Total: 49

Terrain: grassland, wooded forest, salt lakes and mangroves

== Islands surrounding Hindmarsh Island ==
Mundoo Island (35°33'4.35"S 138°55'0.86"E) is a medium-sized island off the east coast of the island. Mundoo Island is a privately owned cattle station. The road acts also as a barrage to prevent the river water flowing through Murray Mouth into the ocean.

Area: 13.4 square kilometres (5.2 square miles)

Perimeter: 27.3 kilometres (17.0 miles)

Distance from Hindmarsh Island: 103 metres (338 feet)

Rat Island/Grindstone Island (35°31'12.59"S 138°57'34.83"E) is a small private owned island 320 metres (1,050 feet) off the easternmost point of the island. It covers 13 hectares (32 acres) of land.

Area: 12 hectares (29 acres)

Perimeter: 1.8 kilometres (1.1 miles)

Distance from Hindmarsh Island: 344 metres (1,129 feet)

Varcoe Island (35°32'30.29"S 138°54'8.55"E) is an extremely small island, with a population of 0.

Area: 913 square metres (9,830 square feet)

Perimeter: 117 metres (384 feet)

Distance from Hindmarsh Island: 380 metres (1,250 feet)

Bird Island/Gull Island (35°33'13.44"S 138°53'42.28"E) is small-sized island which has a population of 0. It is 100 metres (330 feet) off the southernmost point of the island.

Area: 46 hectares (113 acres)

Perimeter: 2.7 kilometres (1.7 miles)

Distance from Hindmarsh Island: 97 metres (318 feet)

Goose Island (35°30'3.98"S 138°56'9.47"E) is a small private island 420 metres (1,380 feet) off the north western area of the island. It has a population of 2, and very close to the coastline of Clayton Bay. Right next to Goose Island is Goat Island, which are 240 240 metres (790 feet) apart. Goose island has sparse vegetation.

Area: 29 hectares (71 acres)

Perimeter: 2.5 kilometres (1.6 miles)

Distance from Hindmarsh Island: 413 metres (1,355 feet)

Goat Island (35°30'17.14"S 138°56'35.78"E) is a small private island 340 metres (1,120 feet) off the north eastern area of the island. Goat island has a population of 1, making it the smallest island by population. Goat island has more vegetation on it than Goose Island, because the ground is damper.

Area: 40 hectares (100 acres)

Perimeter: 3.3 kilometres (2.1 miles)

Distance from Hindmarsh Island: 296 metres (971 feet)

Limestone Island/Goose Island (35°29'30.29"S 138°49'56.99"E) is a small island, which is located in the Game Reserve. It is located 970 metres (3,180 feet) off the northern coast line of the island. It has a population of 0, and it was named Limestone Island because there is limestone rock formations on the island. The island is rarely set foot on by humans, and it has been known to flood in the middle of winter, making the island fully submerged in water. Limestone Island can be viewed very easily from Goolwa north because it is only 700 metres (2,300 feet) away.

Area: 15 hectares (37 acres)

Perimeter: 1,755 metres (5,758 feet)

Distance from Hindmarsh Island: 961 metres (3,153 feet)

== Climate ==
Akin to Adelaide, Hindmarsh Island experiences a typical Mediterranean climate with hot, dry summers, and mild cool winters.

Climate data for Hindmarsh Island (2003-2024)
Month	Jan	Feb	Mar	Apr	May	Jun	Jul	Aug	Sep	Oct	Nov	Dec	Year
Record high °C (°F)	46.8 (116.2)	44.1 (111.4)	41.8 (107.2)	37.6 (99.7)	30.4 (86.7)	26.7 (80.1)	23.5 (74.3)	29.9 (85.8)	32.1 (89.8)	38.4 (101.1)	41.8 (107.2)	45.2 (113.4)	46.8 (116.2)
Mean daily maximum °C (°F)	25.5 (77.9)	24.6 (76.3)	23.9 (75.0)	21.7 (71.1)	18.4 (65.1)	15.9 (60.6)	15.4 (59.7)	16.4 (61.5)	18.7 (65.7)	21.0 (69.8)	23.1 (73.6)	24.5 (76.1)	20.8 (69.4)
Mean daily minimum °C (°F)	16.2 (61.2)	15.8 (60.4)	14.6 (58.3)	12.4 (54.3)	10.5 (50.9)	8.6 (47.5)	8.0 (46.4)	8.3 (46.9)	9.4 (48.9)	10.9 (51.6)	13.1 (55.6)	14.6 (58.3)	11.9 (53.4)
Record low °C (°F)	8.3 (46.9)	7.9 (46.2)	7.7 (45.9)	5.8 (42.4)	0.9 (33.6)	0.3 (32.5)	−0.1 (31.8)	2.1 (35.8)	1.4 (34.5)	4.8 (40.6)	5.2 (41.4)	7.6 (45.7)	−0.1 (31.8)
Average rainfall mm (inches)	18.3 (0.72)	16.1 (0.63)	14.4 (0.57)	27.7 (1.09)	44.4 (1.75)	56.6 (2.23)	48.8 (1.92)	48.4 (1.91)	41.0 (1.61)	29.1 (1.15)	24.5 (0.96)	24.6 (0.97)	393.9 (15.51)
Average rainy days	5.0	5.3	6.9	11.0	15.4	18.3	17.8	17.4	14.5	10.0	8.3	7.5	137.4
Source: Bureau of Meteorology

== Places of interest ==
=== Hindmarsh Island Caravan Park ===
Hindmarsh Island Caravan Park ( 35°30'13.17"S 138°48'53.30"E) is a caravan park located on the northern side of Hindmarsh Island on natural land. The land consists of camping grounds, forests and grasslands. It was developed in the late 1970s and opened in the early 1980s.

Area: 9.0 hectares (22.2 acres)

Perimeter: 1.29 km

=== Hindmarsh Island Monument ===
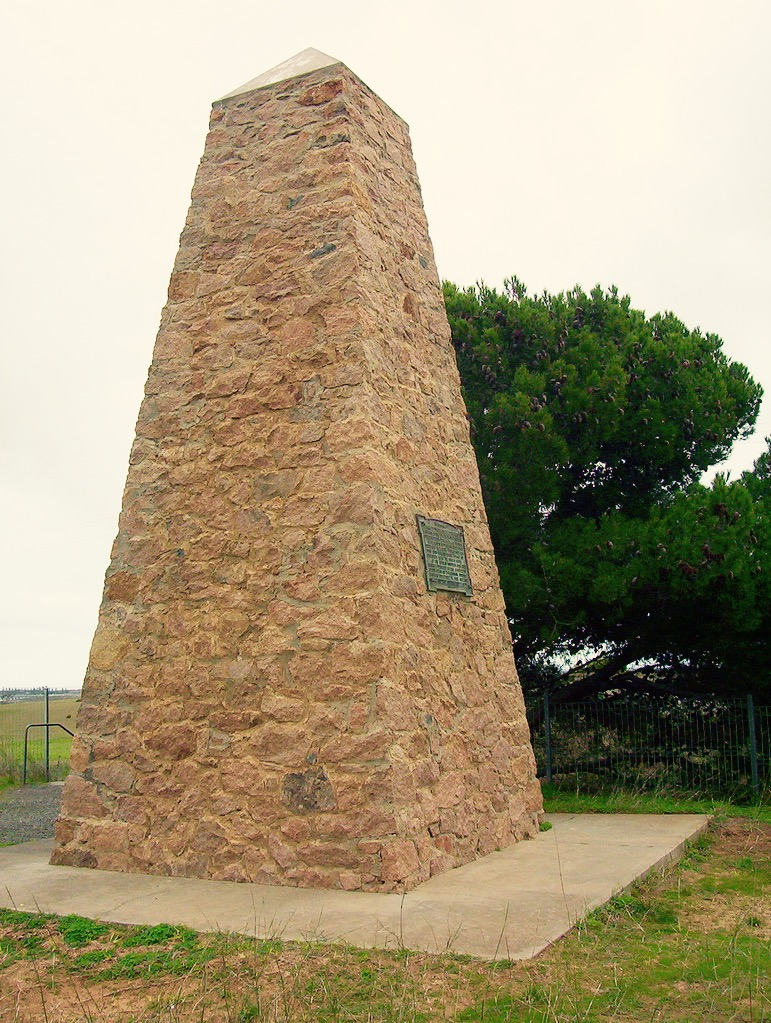
Hindmarsh Island Monument

Hindmarsh Island Monument ( 35°30'38.59"S 138°49'45.71"E) is a monument dedicated to Sturt and Barker on the island, it was erected in 1930.

Height: 3.4 metres (11 feet)

=== Hindmarsh Island Airstrip ===
Hindmarsh Island airstrip, looking north

The Hindmarsh Island Airstrip ( 35°30'19.92"S 138°51'2.48"E) was developed in the 2008, for emergency aircraft landings like the Flying Doctor Service and private Cessnas. The runway is hardened dirt.

Length: 500 metres (1,600 feet)

Width: 12 metres (39 feet)

=== Hindmarsh Island Lookout/Down Hill Track ===
The Hindmarsh Island Lookout (35°30'32.04"S 138°47'33.07"E) was developed in the late 1990s for a viewing point to Goolwa for the Public. It has also been used as a downhill track for mountain bike users. It was built on a hill, 10 metres (33 feet) above sea level.

Area: 0.77 hectares (1.9 acres)

Perimeter: 430 metres (1,410 feet)

=== Lonely Island ===
Lonely Island (35°30'58.98"S 138°51'49.13"E) is the only island (Lonely Island) within an island (Hindmarsh Island) within an island (Australia) in the southern hemisphere. It is located in the centre of a dried up salt lake that fills with water only during winter.

Area: 10.49 hectares (1.21 acres)

Perimeter: 265 metres (869 feet)

=== Hindmarsh Island Weather Receiver ===
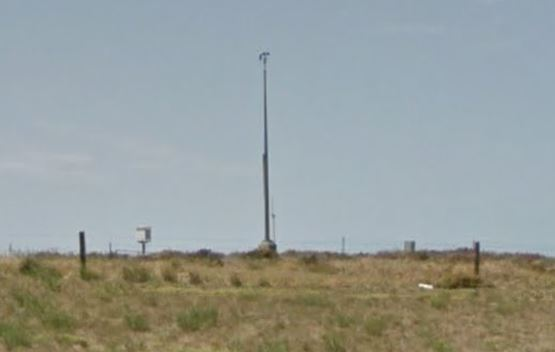
Hindmarsh Island Weather Receiver

Hindmarsh Island Weather Receiver (35°31'10.20"S 138°49'4.17"E) is a weather receiver located adjacent to the Hindmarsh Island Marina. It provides the Bureau of Meteorology with Hindmarsh Island's weather. Surrounded by a steel fence, it is out of bounds to the general public. The weather receiver was built in 2006.

Height: 7 metres (23 feet)

=== Hindmarsh Island River Murray Mouth Lookout ===
Hindmarsh Island River Murray Mouth Lookout (35°32'58.23"S 138°52'58.03"E) is a lookout on the south-west area of the Island.

Area: 181 square metres (1,950 square feet)

Perimeter: 58 metres (190 feet)

=== Lake Cloud ===
Lake Cloud (35°31'12.51"S 138°56'11.54"E) is the largest salt lake on the island. It is located on the eastern part of the Island.

Area: 7.7 hectares (19 acres)

Length: 410 metres (1,350 feet)

Lowest Point: −2 metres (−6.6 feet) (below sea level)

=== Narnu Farm ===
Horse at Narnu Farm

Narnu Farm (35°30'18.17"S 138°49'50.40"E) is a family friendly holiday destination & tourist attraction located on Hindmarsh Island. The farm is full of animals and offers accommodation.

=== Karinga Park Homestead ===
Karinga Park Homestead (35°30'14.40"S 138°49'10.56"E) is a homestead, that offers accommodation and a getaway experience. It covers 8.1 hectares (20 acres) of land, and which a majority of that space is a part of Alberto Forest.

=== Telstra Telephone Tower ===
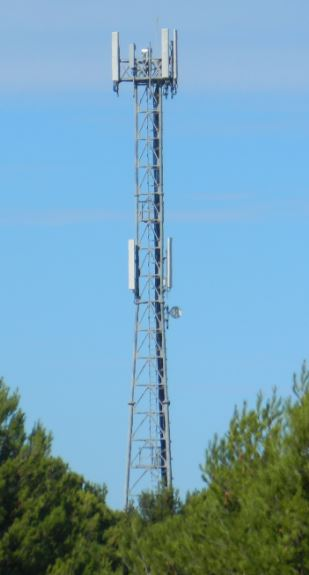
Hindmarsh Island Telephone Tower

The Telstra Telephone Tower (35°30'32.10"S,138°49'0.57"E) is an active Telstra telephone signal tower that gives Telstra phone coverage for the population on Hindmarsh Island. The telephone tower is located in Alberto Forest, it increases on the hill towards the centre; this hill is the tallest point on Hindmarsh Island, which is why the telephone tower was built there.

Constructed: 2006

Height: 42 metres (138 feet)

ASL: 65 metres (213 feet)

Company: Telstra

Site Type: 3G 850

Hertz: 850Mhz

=== Hindmarsh Island mangroves ===
Hindmarsh Island mangroves (35°32'9.81"S 138°53'17.17"E) is Hindmarsh Island's only mangrove. It is located at southern part of the island, approximately 1.2 km north of the Mundoo Channel. It has an area of 7.5 hectares and has a perimeter of 943 m.

=== Hindmarsh Island boat ramps ===
Captain Sturt Parade Boat Ramp: 35°30'6.76"S 138°48'50.37"E

Valmai Tce Boat Ramp: 35°30'9.15"S 138°49'53.25"E

Randell Road Boat Ramp: 35°30'16.58"S 138°47'19.59"E

Monument Road Boat Ramp: 35°30'7.19"S 138°49'45.20"E

Marina Boat Ramp: 35°30'48.79"S 138°48'4.40"E

Sugars Ave Boat Ramp: 35°32'52.94"S 138°52'36.63"E

Mundoo Channel Drive Boat Ramp: 35°32'33.09"S 138°52'54.11"E

=== Clayton Regulator ===
Clayton Regulator (35°29'58.47"S 138°55'18.90"E) was a temporary sand water prevention barrage, that was constructed in 2008 during the drought to prevent water flowing out of the Murray River. It was de-constructed in late 2010.

=== Hindmarsh Island Cemetery ===
Hindmarsh Island Cemetery entrance, pictured in 2013.

Hindmarsh Island Cemetery (35°30'35.40"S 138°51'39.31"E) is an old cemetery located in the centre of the Island, off Randell Road. The surveyor, on the 8 February 1861, fenced off 1 acre of land, expecting it to contain 630 graves. Today the cemetery is a popular attraction, some of the birth dates ranging from the late 1700s to the mid-1900s.

=== Ukrainian Youth Association Camp Ground ===
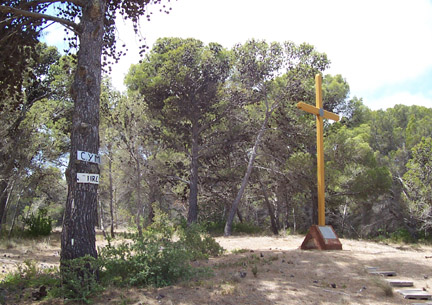
Ukrainian Youth Association Camp Ground entrance with memorial cross, pictured in 2007.

The Ukrainian Youth Association Camp Ground (35°30'37.65"S 138°49'26.74"E) is a campground that is located on Randell Road. The camp site was purchased in the early 1970s and today is used by many other organizations. There is an erected cross and monument at the entrance gate. On the grounds are several buildings with kitchen and meeting facilities.

== Hindmarsh Island forests ==
The forests located on the island covers up to 11%. Forests are spread out over different parts of the Island. On the west side of the Island there is a West Forest (Alberto Forest) and on the east side of the Island there East Forest (Selberto Forest). The forests that are present on the Island were originally planted after 1949, and are not present on the Ariel map available on Alexandrina Council website which was taken in 1949.

=== Alberto Forest ===
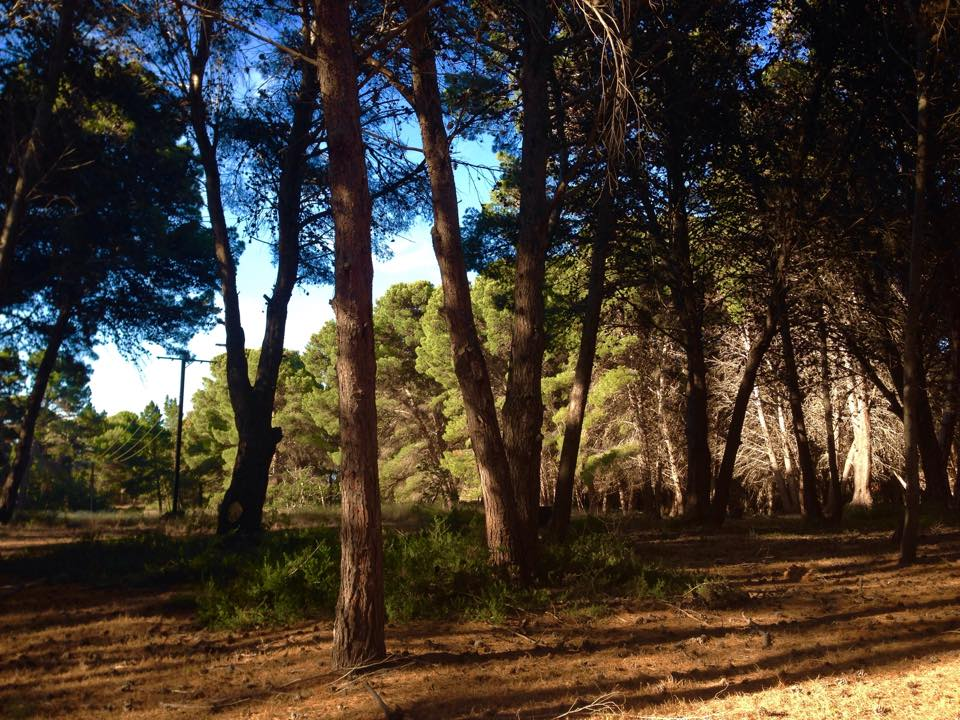
Typical scene in Alberto Forest

Alberto Forest (35°30'28.32"S, 138°48'59.26"E) is located on the west side of the Island, the northern part of Alberto Forest is the Hindmarsh Island Caravan Park (-35.503767"S, 138.814702"E). Also next to the Caravan Park is Karinga Park Homestead (35°30'14.35"S, 138°49'10.57"E) which also is a part of Alberto Forest. Other parts of the Alberto Forest collide with peoples properties. Same parts of the forest are used for timber and some of it is private land. The Alberto consists of Aleppo pines, they range from 15–25 metres (49–82 ft) tall. Its main purpose was to prevent erosion of the sand dune areas.

Perimeter: 6.89 kilometres (4.28 miles)

Area: 1.48 square kilometres (0.57 square miles)

Digger in Alberto Forest, 2014

=== Selberto Forest ===
Selberto Forest (35°30'28.00"S, 138°54'28.43"E) is located on the east side of the island, the Forest mainly collides with residents properties. The trees in Selberto Forest consist of Aleppo pines (Pinus halepensis). The Selberto Forest trees range from 15–30 metres (49–98 ft)tall.

Perimeter: 10.1 kilometres (6.3 miles)

Area: 5.2 square kilometres (2.0 square miles)

== Animals ==
A wide range of biodiversity inhabits Hindmarsh Island, below is a list of animals that live on Hindmarsh Island.

=== Native species ===
Kangaroo

This marsupial is mainly found in the forest and open grassland areas of Hindmarsh Island. These creatures are very sensitive to sound, and usually avoid humans.

Blue tongue lizards

These skinks feed on a wide variety of insects, land snails, flowers, fruits and berries. The lizards often hide below the pine needles in the forest or between rocks.

Australian white ibis

This species is widespread across much of Island. However it is very common along the coastline and in the forest. They often seek shade as much as they can. They are sometimes found as individual birds, but they are most often reported as a group.

Purple swamphen

The Purple swamphen Purple swamphen is commonly found along the coast of the island near reeds and ponds.

Red bellied black snake

The red-bellied black snake (Pseudechis porphyriacus) is a black snake with a distinctive red belly. It widely distributed on the Island. Its venom is capable of causing significant pain and numbness. The snake is hibernating in winter and is found in the forest and grasslands only in summer.

Australian magpies

The Australian magpie (Gymnorhina tibicen) is a medium-sized black and white bird native to Australia. It is found all over the Island, making it the most common bird viewed on Hindmarsh Island.

Barn owl

The barn owl (Tyto alba) is an owl that is only found around the coastline of Australia. It makes a distinctive sound, when it is positioned in a high tree mostly during the night. The forests on Hindmarsh Island are a popular place for the owls to live.

Cape Barren geese

A large flock of over 50 geese resides on the island for much of the year. The Cape Barren goose is classified as endangered.

Little penguins

The little penguin (Eudyptula minor) is the smallest species of penguin. The penguins used to be found along the south coast of the Island, until the 1970s when people where inhabiting the island, the penguins struggled for survival and eventually became extinct in the late 1970s.

=== Introduced species ===
Cattle

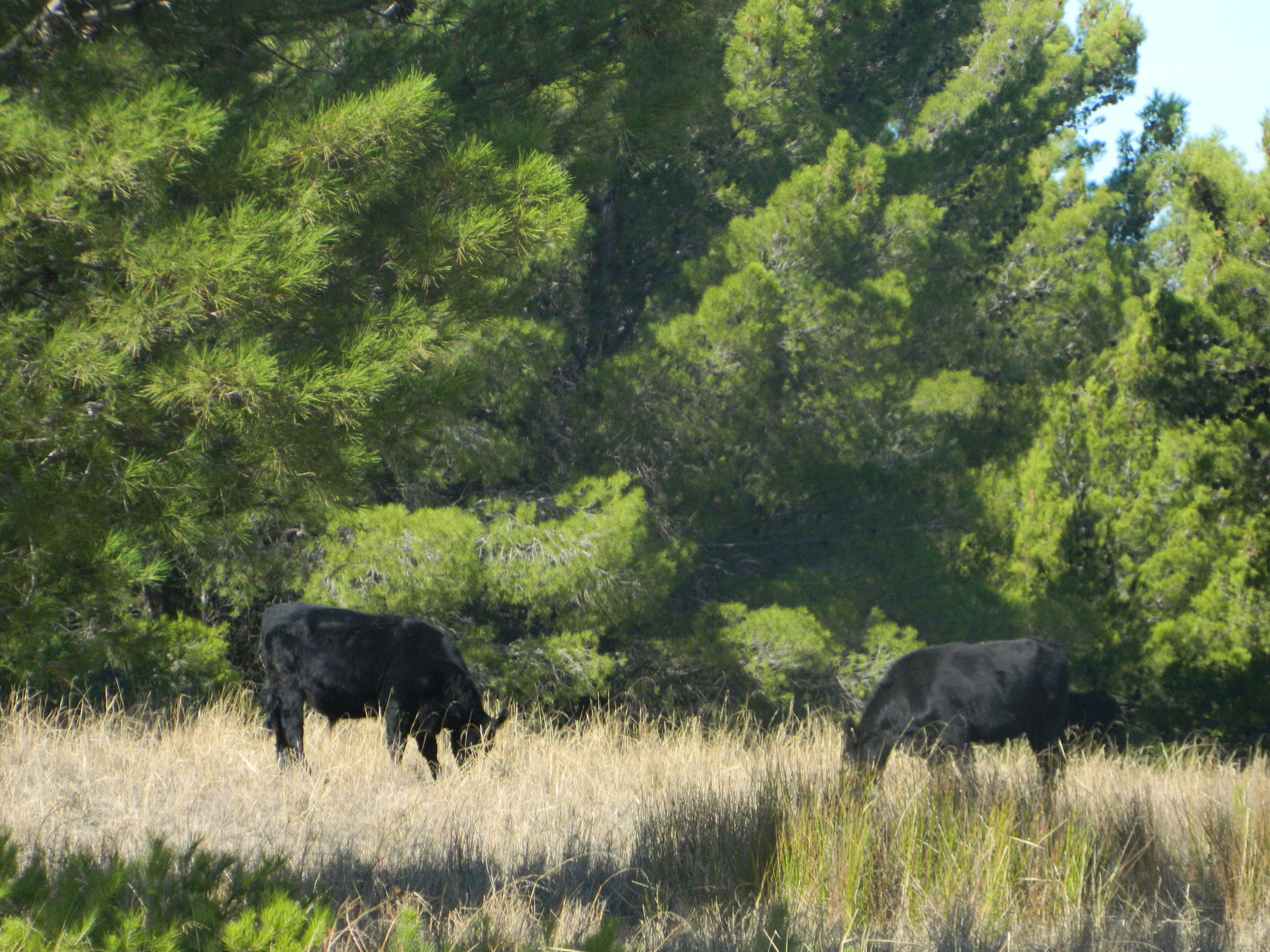
Wagyu bulls in Alberto Forest, 2013

Wagyu bulls seen on the southern part of the Island, close to the Coorong National Park

The bull was introduced to Hindmarsh Island in the 1960s. Some of the bulls were brought in to forests and into farm areas. Bulls in the forest are normally seen sitting in the shade or eating grass amongst the trees. People are warned not to interfere with the bulls in the forest, because they could become aggressive. Bulls are widespread across the island.

European rabbits

The European rabbit (Oryctolagus cuniculus) is a European rabbit that was introduced to the island in the 1950s. They can vary in colour, sometimes gray, white or even black. They can blend into their surroundings very well; they are mostly found in the forest. They are very shy animals and tend to sprint away when approached by a human.

Red fox

The red fox has been present on the island since the 1850s, when they were introduced from Europe. They are extremely invasive creatures, and widely considered as pests. They mostly present on the southern coast of the island, where they enjoy the isolation. The red fox is an extremely shy animal, and will avoid humans when confronted.

== Protected area and associated status ==
Hindmarsh Island either contains or is within the boundaries of the following areas designated for protection and similar purposes. The Lawari Conservation Park which is located on land at the eastern end of the island overlooking the Goolwa Channel to the south and the Mundoo Channel to the east, was proclaimed on 21 March 2017. The Ramsar site known as the Coorong and Lakes Alexandrina and Albert Wetland includes the full extent of the island and its adjoining waters.

== See also ==
- List of crossings of the Murray River
- List of islands within the Murray River in South Australia
