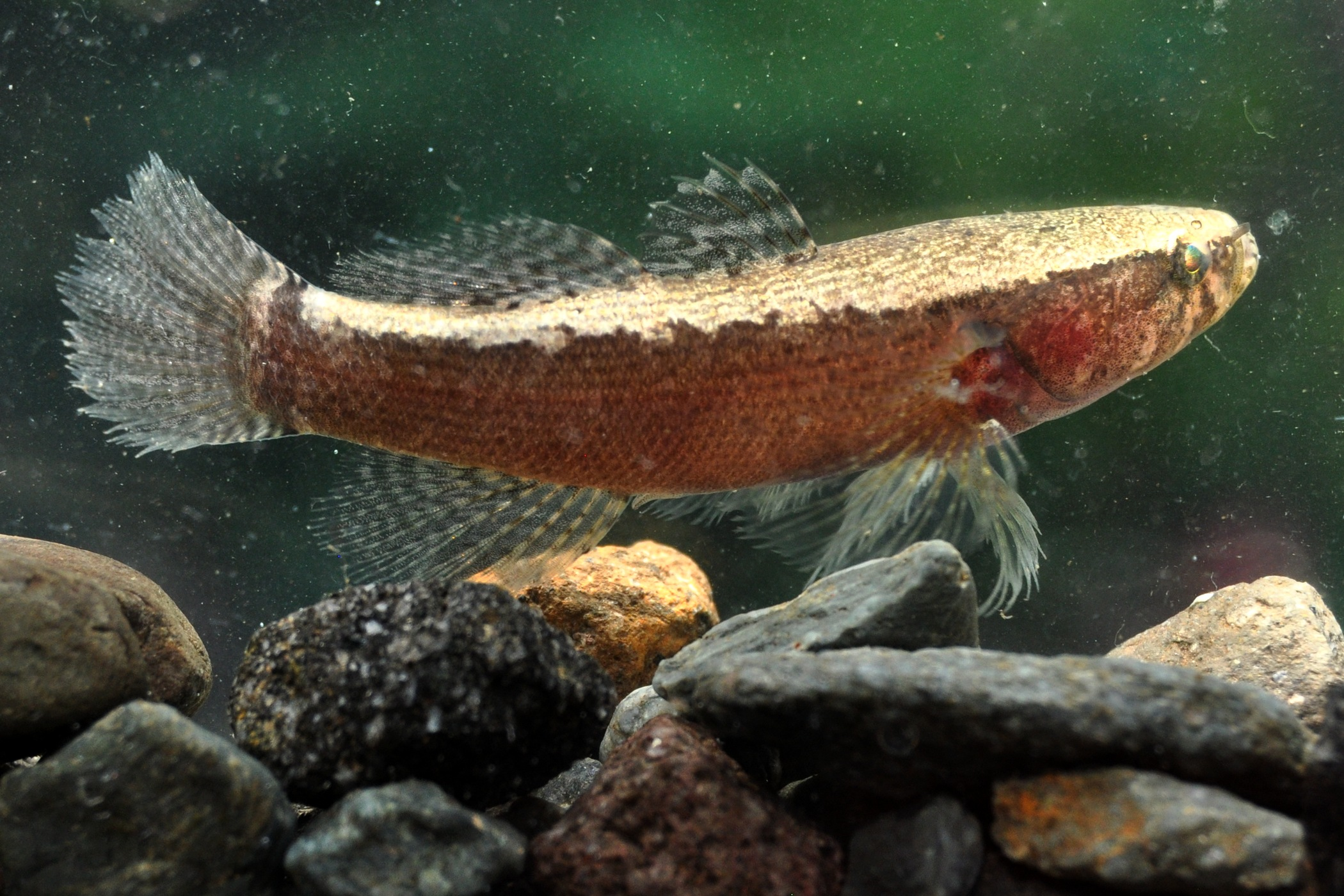
- Eleotris fusca from Java, Indonesia

Conservation status
- Least Concern (IUCN 3.1)

Scientific classification
- Kingdom: Animalia
- Phylum: Chordata
- Class: Actinopterygii
- Division: Teleostei
- Order: Gobiiformes
- Family: Eleotridae
- Genus: Eleotris
- Species: E. fusca

Binomial name
- Eleotris fusca (Forster, 1801)

Synonyms
- Poecilia fusca Bloch & Schneider, 1801; Cottus niger Lacépède, 1801; Cheilodipterus culius Hamilton, 1822; Eleotris niger Quoy & Gaimard, 1824; Eleotris brachyurus Bleeker, 1849; Eleotris fornasini Bianconi, 1857; Eleotris incerta Blyth, 1860; Eleotris (Culius) vitianus Sauvage, 1880; Gobius oopupape Curtiss, 1938; Eleotris andamensis Herre, 1939

= Eleotris fusca =

Species of fish

Eleotris fusca', the dusky sleeper, broadhead sleeper,brown spinecheek gudgeon, brown gudgeon or tetardis, is a species of amphidromous ray-finned fish belonging to the family Eleotridae, the spinycheek sleepers or bullies. This species is found in lagoons, estuaries, and freshwater streams with muddy bottoms in the coasts and islands of the Indian and Pacific Oceans.

== Taxonomy ==
Eleotris fusca was first formally described as Poecilia fusca by the German naturalists Marcus Elieser Bloch and Johann Gottlob Theaenus Schneider with its type locality given as "the Pacific islands", they refer to "is Oriadea", which is Raʻiātea, Society Islands in French Polynesia, South Pacific. This species is classified within the genus Eleotris which was described in 1877 by Giovanni Antonio Scopoli with Gobius pisonis, a species described in 1789 by Johann Friedrich Gmelin from South America, designated as the type species by the International Commission on Zoological Nomenclature using its plenary powers. Eleotris is the type genus of the family Eleotridae, which is classified within the suborder Gobioidei, the gobies, of the order Gobiiformes, which also includes the cardinalfishes and sand divers.

The dusky sleeper may represent a species complex with 2 species occurring in the Indian Ocean, E. fusca and E. klunzingeri. The population in the Hawaiian Islands is a mis-identification and are E. sandwicensis. The sleppers on Madagascar, Seychelles and Reunion may be E. klunzingeri.

== Etymology ==
Eleotris fusca is a member of the genus Eleotris, this name is an Ancient Greek name given to an unidentified fish from the Nile, its actual meaning is unknown. It was applied in 1756 by Laurens Theodor Gronow to gobiiform fishes but gave no explanation. In 1883 David Starr Jordan and Gilbert stated that the name is derived from ēleós, which they said means "bewildered", it actually means "distraught" or "crazed", but their explanation appears to refer to folk etymology. The specific name, fusca, means "dark" or "dusky", an allusion to the brown colour of the body.

== Description ==
Eleotris fusca has an elongated body shape and it reaches a maximum total length of 26 cm (10 in). The first dorsal fin has 6 spines, the second has 1 spine and 8 soft rays, as does the anal fin. It is variable in colour, ranging from pale greyish-brown to dark brown, with thin longitudinal lines on the flanks, and there are 2 or 3 dark stripes on the first dorsal fin. The juveniles have spotted fins.

== Distribution and habitat ==
Eleotris fusca, excluding E. sandvicensis or E. klunzingeri, is found in the Indo-Pacific where it has been recorded from Socotra and the Mascarenes east to the Gambier Islands and Marquesas Islands in French Polynesia, north as far as Fukushima Prefecture in Japan, south to New Caledonia and Rapa Iti. In Australia this species is known from Christmas Island and from Queensland rom Massey Creek to Cape Flattery. The dusky sleeper is found in a variety of habitats ranging from freshwater streams to brackish estuarine and coastal areas. It is most frequently encountered in small coastal freshwater streams. This species hides under logs and in roots in the muddy reaches of estuaries, mangrove swamps and freshwater streams flowing into coastal lagoons.

== Biology ==
Eleotris fusca is oviparous, on Okinawa it spawns between May and December, laying benthic eggs. The larvae of eleotrids typically flow downstream and have a coastal pelagic phase, the length of which is unknown in this species. Once they reach the settlelement phase they begin to enter the estuaries and swim upstream where they feed on aquatic invertebrates and small fishes.
