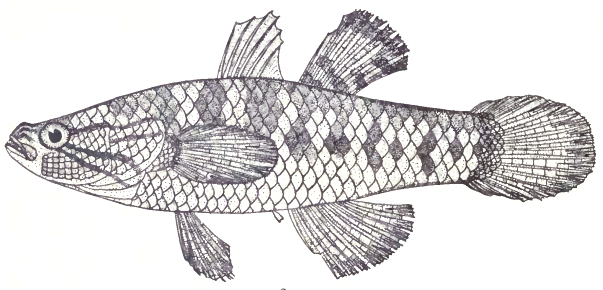

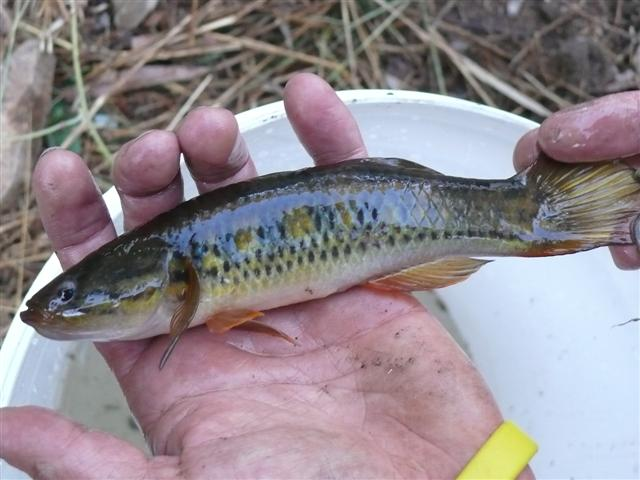

Conservation status
- Least Concern (IUCN 3.1)

Scientific classification
- Kingdom: Animalia
- Phylum: Chordata
- Class: Actinopterygii
- Division: Teleostei
- Order: Gobiiformes
- Family: Eleotridae
- Genus: Giuris
- Species: G. margaritaceus

Binomial name
- Giuris margaritaceus (Valenciennes, 1837)

Synonyms
- Eleotris margaritacea Valenciennes, 1837; Eleotris aporos Bleeker, 1854; Ophieleotris aporos (Bleeker, 1854); Eleotris hoedtii Bleeker, 1854; Eleotris (Giuris) vanicolensis Sauvage, 1880; Ophiocara aporos var. guentheri Koumans, 1937

= Giuris margaritaceus =

Species of fish

Giuris margaritaceus, the snakehead gudgeon, Aporos sleeper, or ornate sleeper, is a species of amphidromous ray-finned fish belonging to family Eleotridae, the spinycheek sleepers or bullies. This species was thought to have a wide Indo-Pacific didtribution but is now considered to be part of a species complex, G. margaritaceus is now thought to be found in the Malay Archipelago and Melanesia.

== Taxonomy ==
Giuris margaritaceus was first formally described as Eleotris margaritacea in 1837 by the French zoologist Achille Valenciennes in volume 12 of Histoire naturelle des poissons with its type locality given as Vanikoro Island, Santa Cruz Islands, southwestern Pacific. In 1880 Henri Émile Sauvage described the new species Eleotris (Giuris) vanicolensis and assigned to a new subgenus of Eleotris, Giuris, and in 1919 David Starr Jordan designated Eleotris (Giuris) vanicolensis as its type species. E. (G.) vanicolensis is a synonym of Giuris margaritaceus. The genus Guiris is classified in the family Eleotridae, which is classified within the suborder Gobioidei, the gobies, of the order Gobiiformes, which also includes the cardinalfishes and sand divers.

This species' name has been applied to a species complex made up of at least eight species and this has caused some taxonomic confusion for the genus.

== Etymology ==
Giuris margaritaceus is the type species of the genus Giuris, a name Sauvage diid not explain but it is thought maybe to be an allusion to the tank goby (Glossogobius giuris), the Specific name of which is a Latinisation of the ghiyuri, a local name for that species in the area around the Ganges. The specific epithet, margaritaceus, means "pearly" in Neo-Latin, Valenciennes said he saw pearly white spots along the sides of this fish.

== Description ==
Giuris margaritaceus has an elongated body shape, it reaches a maximum total length of 31.2 cm (12.3 in) with a maximum weight of 171.2 g (6.04 oz). There are a total of 7 spines and 8 or 9 soft rays while the anal fin has 1 spines and 9 soft rays. Its body is relatively large and robust with a cylindrical cross section with a flattened head. The overall colour is greenish brown with 8-10 dark bars across sides and a large black blotch at the base of the pectoral fins. The ventral half of the head is tan or yellowish with 3 or 4 dark brown to reddish stripes radiating from lower orbit.

== Distribution and habitat ==
Giuris margaritaceus sensu stricto is found in Indonesia on Ambon, Ceram, Halmahera and Sulawesi, the Philippines, Palau, Papua New Guinea, Solomon Islands and Vanuatu to Gaua Island. Here it inhabits freshwater and estuarine areas of shallow rivers and streams, as well as swamps and turbid creeks where it is frequently found in vegetation along riverbanks or sheltering over rocky or gravel beds.
