= Dormitator lophocephalus =

Conservation status
- Least Concern (IUCN 3.1)

Scientific classification
- Kingdom: Animalia
- Phylum: Chordata
- Class: Actinopterygii
- Order: Gobiiformes
- Family: Eleotridae
- Genus: Dormitator
- Species: D. lophocephalus

Binomial name
- Dormitator lophocephalus Hoedeman, 1951

Species of fish

Dormitator lophocephalus is a species of fish in the family Eleotridae. It is found in Suriname.

== Description ==
Males of this species can reach a length of 9.0 cm (3.5 in).
