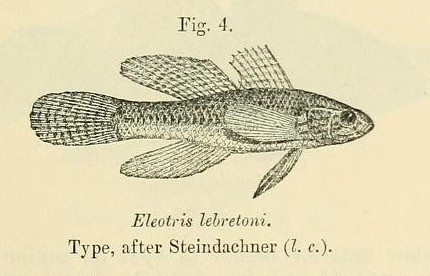
- Illustration

Conservation status
- Least Concern (IUCN 3.1)

Scientific classification
- Kingdom: Animalia
- Phylum: Chordata
- Class: Actinopterygii
- Order: Gobiiformes
- Family: Eleotridae
- Genus: Dormitator
- Species: D. lebretonis

Binomial name
- Dormitator lebretonis (Steindachner, 1870)

Synonyms
- Eleotris lebretonis Steindachner, 1870; Batanga lebretonis (Steindachner, 1870); Batanga lebretonis lebretonis (Steindachner, 1870); Batanga lebretoni (Steindachner, 1870); Eleotris omosema C. G. E. Ahl, 1935; Batanga lebretonis microphthalmus Meinken, 1966

= Dormitator lebretonis =

Species of fish

Dormitator lebretonis is a species of fish in the family Eleotridae. It is found in the eastern Atlantic Ocean from Senegal to the Kunene River in Namibia.

== Description ==
Males of this species can reach a total length of 12.4 cm (4.9 in),
