= Striped mogurnda =

Conservation status
- Critically Endangered (IUCN 3.1)

Scientific classification
- Kingdom: Animalia
- Phylum: Chordata
- Class: Actinopterygii
- Order: Gobiiformes
- Family: Eleotridae
- Genus: Mogurnda
- Species: M. vitta

Binomial name
- Mogurnda vitta G. R. Allen & Hoese, 1986

Species of fish

The striped mogurnda (Mogurnda vitta) is a species of fish in the family Eleotridae endemic to Lake Kutubu in Papua New Guinea. This species can reach a standard length of 12.5 cm (4.9 in).
