= Chame =

Chame may refer to:

- Chame, Nepal
- Chame, Panama
- Dormitator latifrons (Pacific Fat Sleeper), a food fish
