= Dormitator cubanus =

Conservation status
- Data Deficient (IUCN 3.1)

Scientific classification
- Kingdom: Animalia
- Phylum: Chordata
- Class: Actinopterygii
- Order: Gobiiformes
- Family: Eleotridae
- Genus: Dormitator
- Species: D. cubanus

Binomial name
- Dormitator cubanus Ginsburg, 1953

Species of fish

Dormitator cubanus is a species of fish in the family Eleotridae. It is found in Cuba.

== Description ==
Males of this species can reach a standard length of 9.4 cm (3.7 in).
