= Eleotris pellegrini =

Conservation status
- Least Concern (IUCN 3.1)

Scientific classification
- Kingdom: Animalia
- Phylum: Chordata
- Class: Actinopterygii
- Order: Gobiiformes
- Family: Eleotridae
- Genus: Eleotris
- Species: E. pellegrini

Binomial name
- Eleotris pellegrini Maugé, 1984

Species of fish

Eleotris pellegrini is a species of fish in the family Eleotridae endemic to Madagascar where it can be found in mangrove swamps. This species can reach a length of 23 cm (9.1 in). The specific name honours the French ichthyologist Jacques Pellegrin (1873-1944), who discovered this species in 1933 but thought that it was Eleotris vittata.
