= Blotched mogurnda =

Conservation status
- Critically Endangered (IUCN 3.1)

Scientific classification
- Kingdom: Animalia
- Phylum: Chordata
- Class: Actinopterygii
- Order: Gobiiformes
- Family: Eleotridae
- Genus: Mogurnda
- Species: M. spilota

Binomial name
- Mogurnda spilota G. R. Allen & Hoese, 1986

Species of fish

The blotched mogurnda (Mogurnda spilota) is a species of fish in the family Eleotridae endemic to Lake Kutubu. This species can reach a standard length of 13 cm (5.1 in).
