= Kokoda mogurnda =

Conservation status
- Endangered (IUCN 3.1)

Scientific classification
- Kingdom: Animalia
- Phylum: Chordata
- Class: Actinopterygii
- Order: Gobiiformes
- Family: Eleotridae
- Genus: Mogurnda
- Species: M. lineata

Binomial name
- Mogurnda lineata G. R. Allen & Hoese, 1991

Species of fish

The Kokoda mogurnda (Mogurnda lineata) is a species of fish in the family Eleotridae endemic to Papua New Guinea, where it is an inhabitant of clear streams in the rainforest. This species can reach a length of 8.5 cm (3.3 in).
