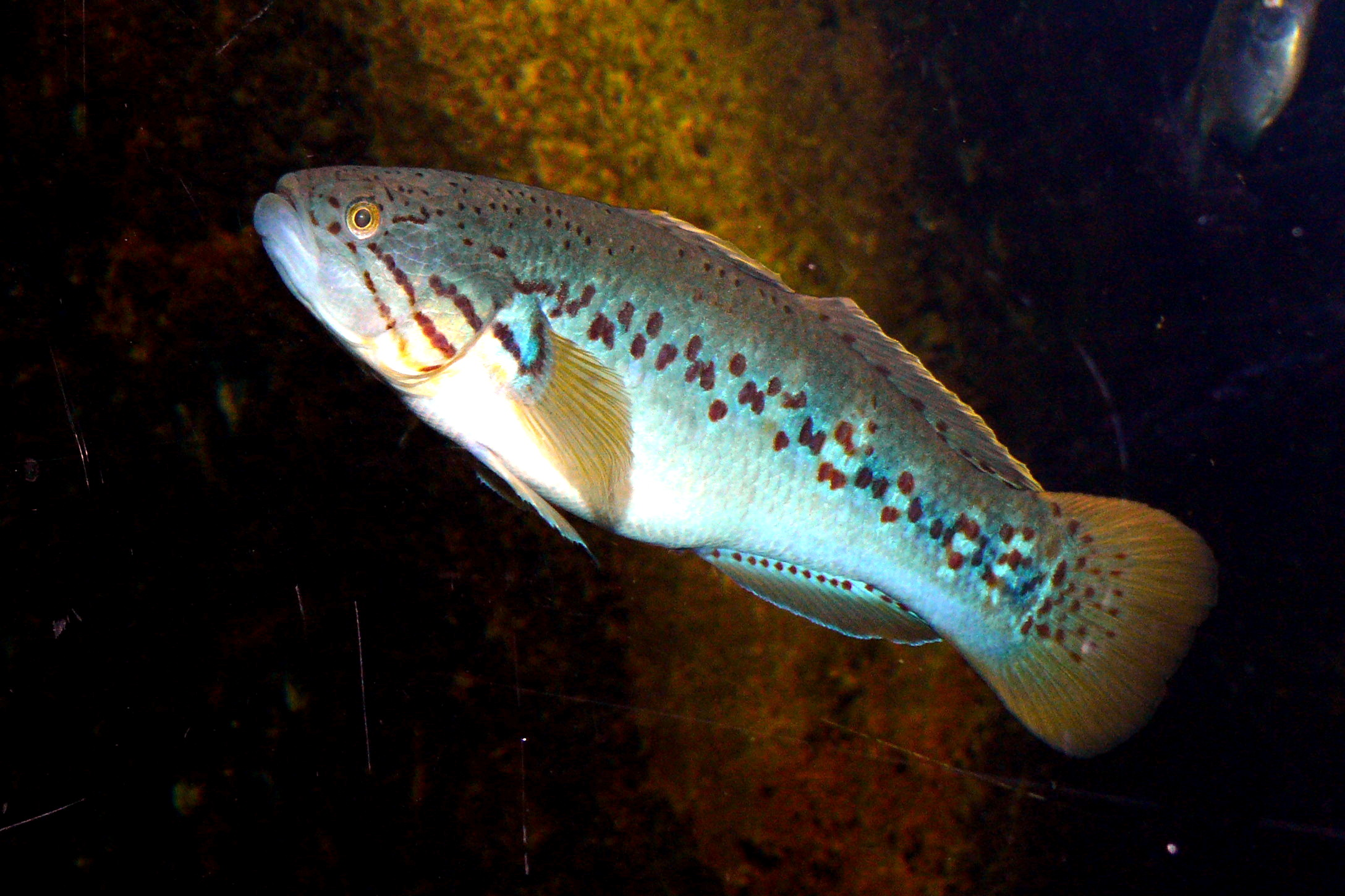

Conservation status
- Least Concern (IUCN 3.1)

Scientific classification
- Kingdom: Animalia
- Phylum: Chordata
- Class: Actinopterygii
- Division: Teleostei
- Order: Gobiiformes
- Family: Eleotridae
- Genus: Mogurnda
- Species: M. adspersa

Binomial name
- Mogurnda adspersa (Castelnau, 1878)

Synonyms
- Eleotris adspersa Castelnau, 1878

= Mogurnda adspersa =

Species of fish

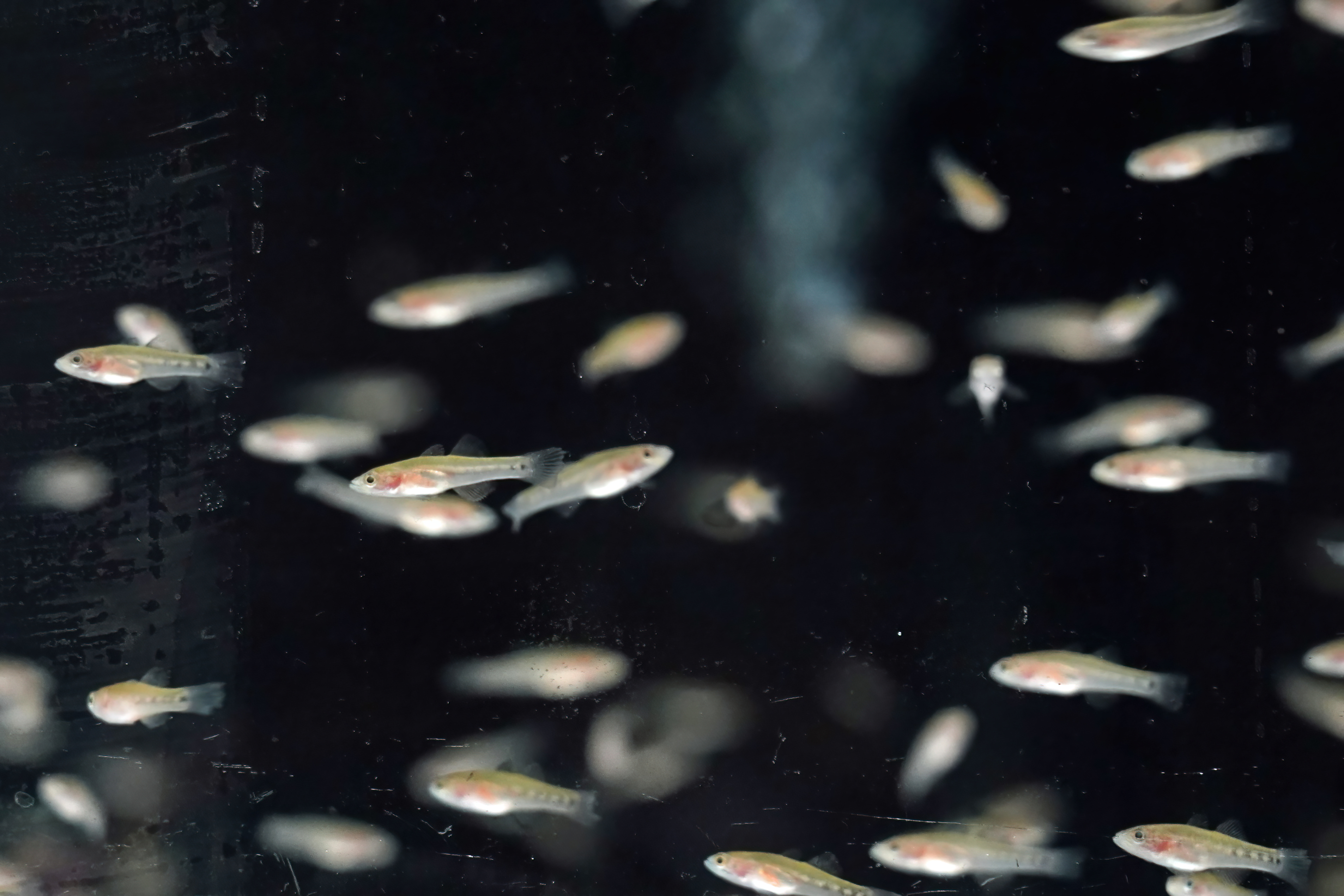
Mogurnda adspersa fry in a captive breeding program at Melbourne Aquarium

Mogurnda adspersa (commonly known as the southern purple-spotted gudgeon) is a species of endangered gudgeon that is endemic to south-eastern mainland Australia (the states of South Australia, New South Wales and Victoria and Queensland). The fish is brown, although the shade becomes lighter near its abdomen. Spots of various colours occur on its sides. After a dramatic population decline in the late 20th century, the fish was thought to be locally extinct in several areas, but was rediscovered both in South Australia and Victoria in the 21st century. Various state governments, the (Commonwealth Government) Murray-Darling Basin Authority, and various volunteer organisations have been taking measures to increase the fish's numbers.

== Description ==
Mogurnda adspersa is countershaded dark brown on top, with its colour becoming progressively lighter on the sides and underside, where it is light brown or cream. The fish has three red bars on each cheek, and red, purple, black, and white spots along its sides. These spots are more visible when it is breeding. It is typically 8 cm (3.1 in) long, although it can grow up to 14 cm (5.5 in).

== Distribution and habitat ==
The southern purple-spotted gudgeon is endemic to southeastern Australia, particularly the Murray-Darling basin and coastal drainages northeast of the Clarence River. It is a benthic fish, and is usually found in calm rivers or creeks. It swims among underwater plants, branches, and rocks.

== Feeding ==
The fish feeds on small fish, plants, and other assorted animals, such as shrimp, worms, tadpoles, insects larvae, and small crustaceans.

== Breeding ==
During the breeding season, which generally spans from November to March, the female fish lays multiple batches of 30–1,300 eggs. The eggs are laid on underwater objects and plants. After the eggs are laid, the male fish guards the eggs and fans them with his fins. The young fish hatch from the eggs after 3–9 days.

== Conservation status ==
As of 2018, M. adspersa was classified as threatened (regionally extinct) in Victoria, endangered in New South Wales, and critically endangered in South Australia. It is not considered threatened in Queensland. It is listed as a species of least concern on the International Union for the Conservation of Nature's Red List on the basis of its widespread distribution throughout the country, though the declining Murray–Darling Basin population is noted as a major conservation concern.

Though common in southeastern Australia, its numbers sharply declined in the 1980s, due to the introduction of predatory fish, lack of food, and changing water levels, which interfered with the fish's breeding.

The fish was feared extinct in the Murray–Darling Basin for many years, and in the state of South Australia for over 30 years, before being rediscovered at the wetland in the lower reaches of the Murray River in 2002. The population plunged during the 2009–2010 drought, again threatening local extinction, but its continued existence in the area was ensured by a captive breeding program at Urrbrae Agricultural High School, Alberton Primary School and Nature Glenelg Trust's Berri site. 500 fish were able to be returned to the wetlands by October 2015.

In an effort to increase the fish's abundance, the New South Wales Department of Primary Industries instituted a captive-breeding program, in hopes of eventually releasing the more "genetically variable" fish into the wild, where they can reproduce with the remaining wild populations and recover from their previous population decline by "recover[ing] genetic variation".

The fish was declared to be locally extinct in Victoria in 1998. In 2018, two of the fish were found in wetlands in Victoria, and researchers started looking for more. In March 2021 it was reported that 66 more were found, living in a colony in a thickly reeded area. Some of the fish were being taken to breeders to help increase the population in the Kerang lakes area and the Murray.
