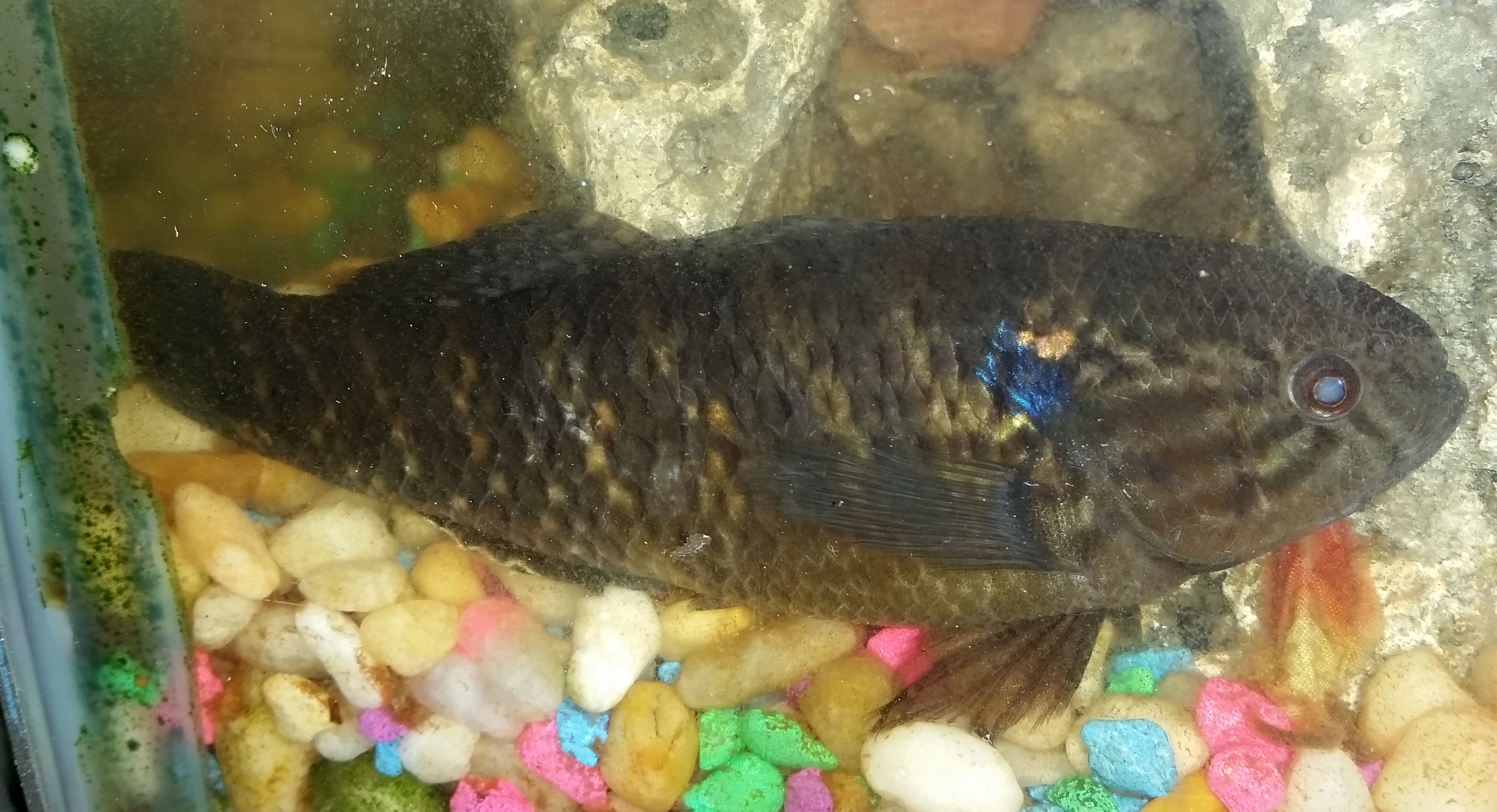

Conservation status
- Least Concern (IUCN 3.1)

- Secure (NatureServe)

Scientific classification
- Kingdom: Animalia
- Phylum: Chordata
- Class: Actinopterygii
- Order: Gobiiformes
- Family: Eleotridae
- Genus: Dormitator
- Species: D. maculatus

Binomial name
- Dormitator maculatus (Bloch, 1792)

Synonyms
- Sciaena maculata Bloch, 1792; Eleotris grandisquama Valenciennes, 1837; Eleotris mugiloides Valenciennes, 1837; Eleotris sima Valenciennes, 1837; Eleotris somnulentus Girard, 1858; Eleotris gundlachi Poey, 1860; Eleotris omocyaneus Poey, 1860; Dormitator microphthalmus Gill, 1863; Dormitator lineatus Gill, 1863; Eleotris pleurops Boulenger, 1909; Batanga pleurops (Boulenger, 1909); Dormitator pleurops (Boulenger, 1909); Dormitator macrophthalmus Puyo, 1944; Dormitator lophocephalus Hoedeman, 1951

= Dormitator maculatus =

Species of fish

The fat sleeper (Dormitator maculatus) is a species of fish belonging to the family Eleotridae, known for their flat heads; they are generally found in fresh water, usually found in lakes, ponds and rivers.

== Description ==
Fat sleepers are small fish that have two distinct dorsal fins and scaled, flat heads. Their tails are rounded. They are fully scaled, and their fins are higher up on the body than other species. Their bodies are a darker brown, whereas their dorsal and anal fins are redder in color. They have a dark blue spot around their gill covers.

== Distribution and habitat ==
The fat sleeper is found from the Bahamas and North Carolina to Brazil. It lives in intertidal areas on muddy bottoms, and is more frequent in brackish water. It can be found commonly in freshwater or saline coastal pools and river mouths.
