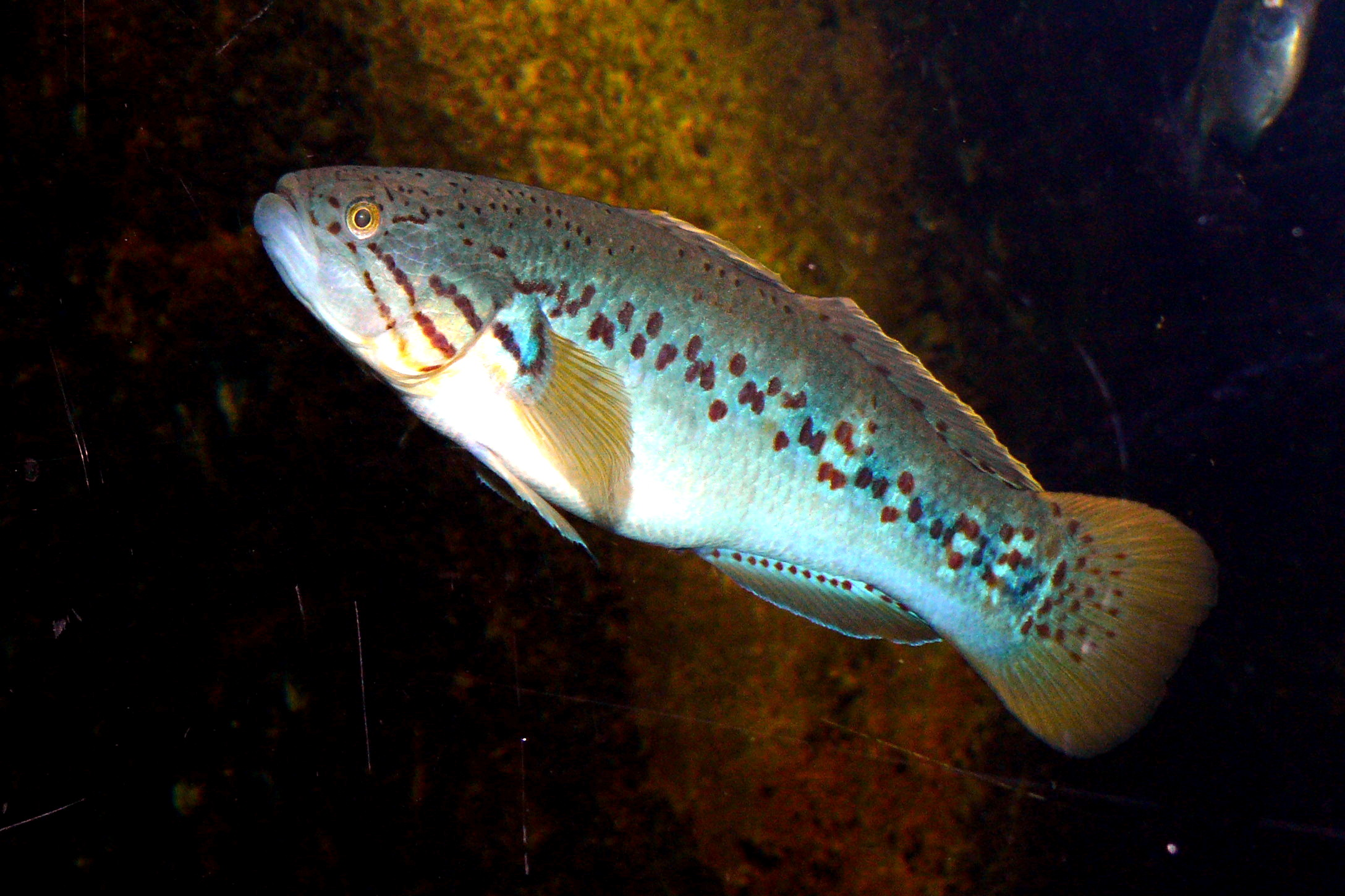
- Southern purple-spotted gudgeon (M. adspersa)

Scientific classification
- Kingdom: Animalia
- Phylum: Chordata
- Class: Actinopterygii
- Order: Gobiiformes
- Family: Eleotridae
- Genus: Mogurnda; T. N. Gill, 1863

Type species
- Eleotris mogurnda J. Richardson, 1844

= Mogurnda =

Genus of fishes

Mogurnda is a genus of freshwater fishes in the family Eleotridae native to eastern and northern Australia and New Guinea. Several species are endemic to Lake Kutubu in Papua New Guinea.

== Species ==
The currently recognized species in this genus are:

- Mogurnda adspersa Castelnau, 1878 ([southern] purple-spotted gudgeon)
- Mogurnda aiwasoensis G. R. Allen & Renyaan, 1996
- Mogurnda arguni G. R. Allen & Hadiaty, 2014
- Mogurnda aurifodinae Whitley, 1938 (northern mogurnda)
- Mogurnda cingulata G. R. Allen & Hoese, 1991 (banded mogurnda)
- Mogurnda clivicola G. R. Allen & A. P. Jenkins, 1999 (Flinders Ranges mogurnda)
- Mogurnda furva G. R. Allen & Hoese, 1986 (black mogurnda)
- Mogurnda kaifayama G. R. Allen & A. P. Jenkins, 1999
- Mogurnda kaimana G. R. Allen & Hadiaty, 2014
- Mogurnda kutubuensis G. R. Allen & Hoese, 1986 (Lake Kutubu mogurnda)
- Mogurnda larapintae Zietz (fi), 1896 (desert mogurnda)
- Mogurnda lineata G. R. Allen & Hoese, 1991 (Kokoda mogurnda)
- Mogurnda maccuneae A. P. Jenkins, Buston & G. R. Allen, 2000
- Mogurnda magna G. R. Allen & Renyaan, 1996
- Mogurnda malsmithi G. R. Allen & Jebb, 1993
- Mogurnda mbuta G. R. Allen & A. P. Jenkins, 1999
- Mogurnda mogurnda J. Richardson, 1844 (Northern trout gudgeon)
- Mogurnda mosa A. P. Jenkins, Buston & G. R. Allen, 2000
- Mogurnda oligolepis G. R. Allen & A. P. Jenkins, 1999 (Kimberley mogurnda)
- Mogurnda orientalis G. R. Allen & Hoese, 1991 (eastern mogurnda)
- Mogurnda pardalis G. R. Allen & Renyaan, 1996
- Mogurnda pulchra Horsthemke & Staeck, 1990 (Moresby mogurnda)
- Mogurnda spilota G. R. Allen & Hoese, 1986 (blotched mogurnda)
- Mogurnda thermophila G. R. Allen & A. P. Jenkins, 1999 (Dalhousie mogurnda)
- Mogurnda variegata Nichols, 1951 (variegated mogurnda)
- Mogurnda vitta G. R. Allen & Hoese, 1986 (striped mogurnda)
- Mogurnda wapoga G. R. Allen, A. P. Jenkins & Renyaan, 1999
