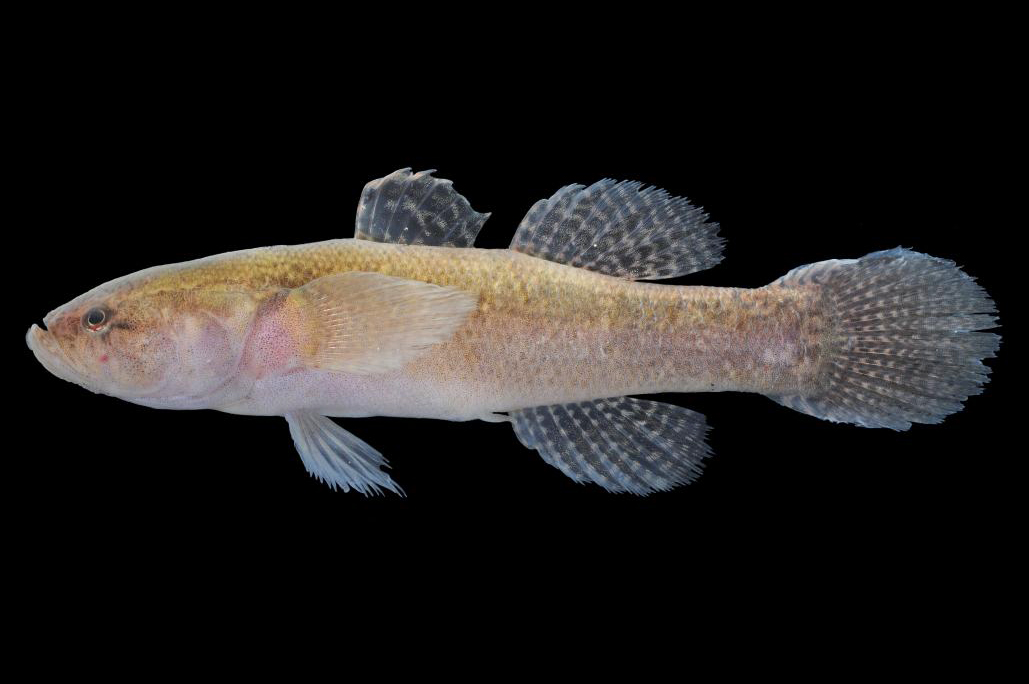

Conservation status
- Least Concern (IUCN 3.1)

Scientific classification
- Kingdom: Animalia
- Phylum: Chordata
- Class: Actinopterygii
- Division: Teleostei
- Order: Gobiiformes
- Family: Eleotridae
- Genus: Eleotris
- Species: E. melanosoma

Binomial name
- Eleotris melanosoma Bleeker, 1852

Synonyms
- Eleotris pseudacanthopomus Bleeker, 1853; Culius insulindicus Bleeker, 1875; Eleotris fortis Tanaka, 1912; Eleotris hainanensis J. T. F. Chen, 1933

= Eleotris melanosoma =

Species of fish

Eleotris melanosoma, the broadhead sleeper, black spinecheek gudgeon, black gudgeon or ebony gudgeon, is a species of amphidromous ray-finned fish belonging to the family Eleotridae, the spinycheek sleepers or bullies. This species is found in the Indo-Pacific region.

== Taxonomy ==
Eleotris melanosoma was first formally described in 1852 by the Dutch physician, herpetologist and ichthyologist Pieter Bleeker with its type locality given as Wahai, western Sumatra, although this should be Ceram], Indonesia, in sea. This species is classified within the genus Eleotris which was described in 1877 by Giovanni Antonio Scopoli with Gobius pisonis, a species described in 1789 by Johann Friedrich Gmelin from South America, designated as the type species by the International Commission on Zoological Nomenclature using its plenary powers. Eleotris is the type genus of the family Eleotridae, which is classified within the suborder Gobioidei, the gobies, of the order Gobiiformes, which also includes the cardinalfishes and sand divers.

There are 2 disjunct populations of this species, on e in the western Indian Ocean and the other in the eastern Indian Ocean and Western Pacific Ocean. The western Indian Ocean fishes may be assignable to Eleotris soaresi.

== Etymology ==
Eleotris melanosoma is a member of the genus Eleotris, this name is an Ancient Greek name given to an unidentified fish from the Nile, its actual meaning is unknown. It was applied in 1756 by Laurens Theodor Gronow to gobiiform fishes but gave no explanation. In 1883 David Starr Jordan and Gilbert stated that the name is derived from ēleós, which they said means "bewildered", it actually means "distraught" or "crazed", but their explanation appears to refer to folk etymology. The specific name, melanosoma, means "black body", thought to be an allusion to the black or blackish green colour of the upper body.

== Description ==
Eleotris melanosoma has an elongated body shape and it reaches a standard length of 26 cm (10 in). The first dorsal fin has 6 spines, the second has 1 spine and 8 soft rays, as does the anal fin. The upper body is dusky red or dusky greene, paler on the lower body. There is normally a dusky blotch at the base of the pectoral fin. The fin membranes are dusky to violet, with the rays being orange to dusky with dark spots on the rays of dorsal, caudal and pectoral fins. The dorsal and anal fins with dark horizontal stripes.

== Distribution and habitat ==
Eleotris melanosoma has a wide Indo-Pacific distribution from the coast of eastern Africa from Kenya to South Africa and Madagascar then from Southeast Asia through the Malay Archipelago, north to Japan, south to Australia and New Caledonia, east to French Polynesia. In Australia it is recorded from Queensland between Lizard Island and Innisfail. The broadhead sleeper is found in estuaries and freshwater rivers, typically on muddy, sandy or gravel beds. The adults occur brackish estuaries and medium to large size rivers, where they shelter among leaf litter, woody debris and the emergent vegetation of freshwater streams.

== Biology ==
Eleotris melanosoma is an oviparous species, the females lay a large number of benthic eggs. The larvae are thought to have a marine pelagic phase. The larvae settle out in tidal, estuarine waters. These fishes feed on aquatic invertebrates and small fishes.
