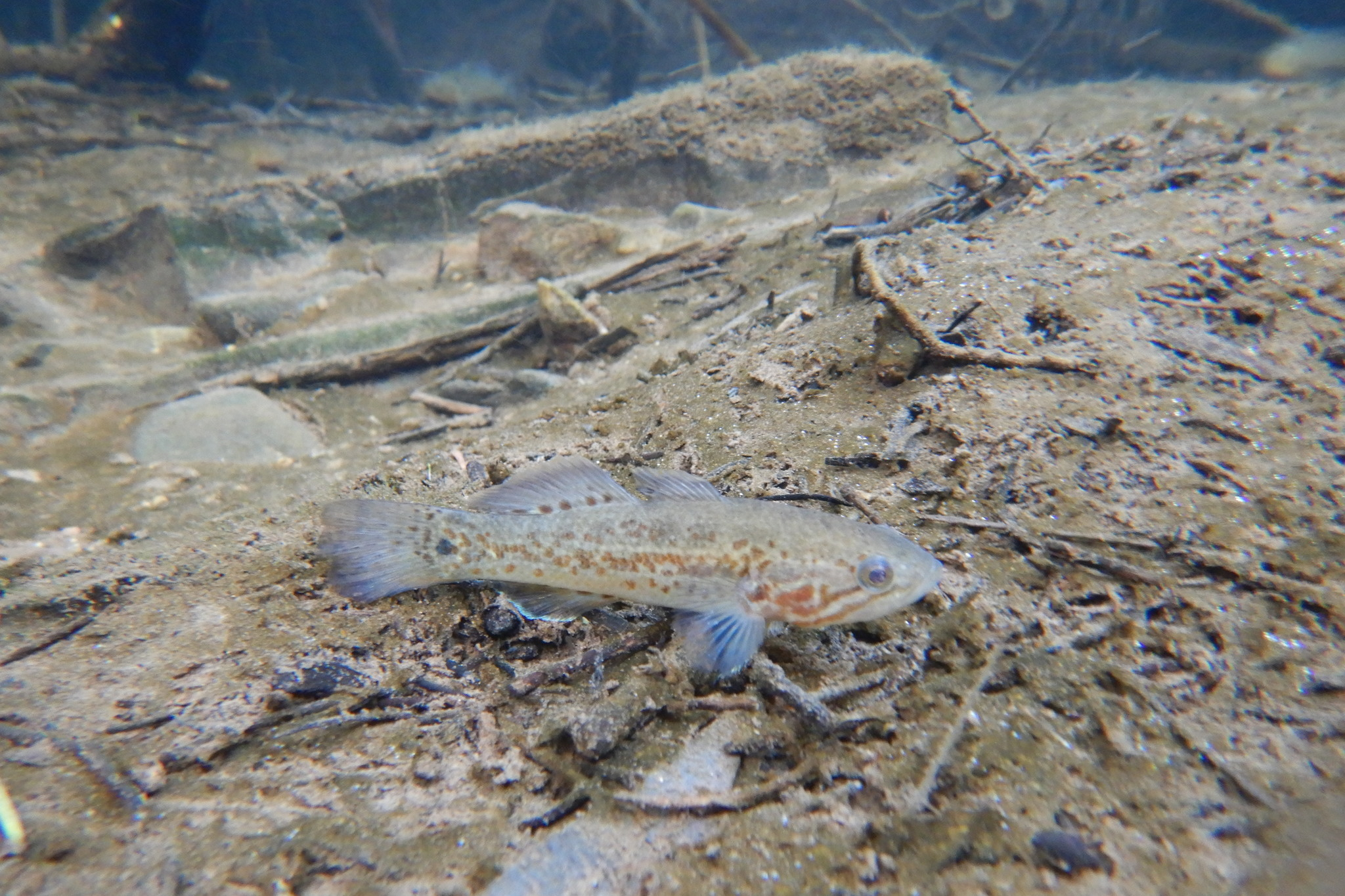

Conservation status
- Endangered (IUCN 3.1)

Scientific classification
- Kingdom: Animalia
- Phylum: Chordata
- Class: Actinopterygii
- Order: Gobiiformes
- Family: Eleotridae
- Genus: Mogurnda
- Species: M. clivicola

Binomial name
- Mogurnda clivicola G. R. Allen & A. P. Jenkins, 1999

= Mogurnda clivicola =

Species of fish

Mogurnda clivicola, commonly known as the Flinders Ranges mogurnda, Flinders Ranges purple-spotted gudgeon, Barcoo, or Bulloo mogurnda, is a central Australian gudgeon of the family Eleotridae.

== Distribution ==
Flinders Ranges gudgeons are found in permanent water in an isolated set of spring-fed creeks in the southern Gammon Ranges National Park in the arid South Australian outback. These creeks are often in very steep-sided, rocky gorges. This fish's habitat is usually isolated into separate pools and then subject to floods that change the water level by several metres.

These fish have also been recorded in samples taken from the Barcoo and Bulloo Rivers in Queensland away from the main population, in the very different habitat of larger, muddy-bottomed rivers.

== Description ==
Flinders Ranges mogurndas are medium-sized fish, with a maximum total length around 13 cm.^{[I]} They are dark with a fine mottling of dark grey blotches on the upper side with semi-translucent fins. Usually their body is a paler colour underneath. These fish have a series of burnt orange-coloured stripes running backwards down their cheeks looking like warpaint. Roughly around the lateral line is a display of burnt orange-coloured spots interspersed with paler spots, with a single darker spot on the caudal peduncle. Males develop spectacular spawning colours in summer, namely a more brilliant display of orange spots along the side and to the tail. The anal and spiny and soft dorsal fins are edged with a tiny, iridescent, blue-white stripe. These stripes are somewhat subtle on most of the fins, but are prominent and eye-catching on the spiny dorsal fin. The males also develop a large amount of fat on the top of their heads, giving them a bulbous appearance.

These fish have, in recent times been victims of a dramatic, piebald discolouration of unknown origin.

== Ecology and behaviour ==
In the Flinders Ranges, M. clivicola is the only species of fish found in the rocky pools which they inhabit. They will bask lying on the shallow shelves of deeper rock pools, with their tails to one side. From above, in this position, they closely resemble the fallen gum leaves on the substrate. In the Barcoo River, the species usually co-exists with up to 10 other fish species in the typically mud-bottomed lowland streams of that system. Their predators consist mostly of larger birds. They are presumed to be ambush predators. Tadpoles, insects, and other macroinvertebrates probably form a large part of their diet. Breeding and spawning is a complex ritual spread over days. These fish spawn when the water temperature reaches 20 °C or higher. The males care for the eggs and guard and fan them with their pectoral fins. The males' behaviour becomes quite territorial and aggressive during breeding season. They have been known to chase the other fish around.
