= Eleotris vomerodentata =

Conservation status
- Data Deficient (IUCN 3.1)

Scientific classification
- Kingdom: Animalia
- Phylum: Chordata
- Class: Actinopterygii
- Order: Gobiiformes
- Family: Eleotridae
- Genus: Eleotris
- Species: E. vomerodentata

Binomial name
- Eleotris vomerodentata Maugé, 1984

Species of fish

Eleotris vomerodentata is a species of fish in the family Eleotridae endemic to Madagascar, where it is only known to occur in fresh waters. This species can reach a length of 7.8 cm (3.1 in). Eleotris have similar features, generally, but there are ways to distinguish an Eleotris vomerodentata. The head, preoperculum, body and abdomen are beige to light brown. The fins are whitish-beige in color. The most common distinguishing feature is the presence of teeth in the vomer.
