= Eastern mogurnda =

Conservation status
- Endangered (IUCN 3.1)

Scientific classification
- Kingdom: Animalia
- Phylum: Chordata
- Class: Actinopterygii
- Order: Gobiiformes
- Family: Eleotridae
- Genus: Mogurnda
- Species: M. orientalis

Binomial name
- Mogurnda orientalis G. R. Allen & Hoese, 1991

Species of fish

The eastern mogurnda (Mogurnda orientalis) is a species of fish in the family Eleotridae endemic to Papua New Guinea, where it is only known to occur in deep pools around Safia. This species can reach a length of 11 cm (4.3 in).
