= Black mogurnda =

Conservation status
- Critically Endangered (IUCN 3.1)

Scientific classification
- Kingdom: Animalia
- Phylum: Chordata
- Class: Actinopterygii
- Order: Gobiiformes
- Family: Eleotridae
- Genus: Mogurnda
- Species: M. furva

Binomial name
- Mogurnda furva G. R. Allen & Hoese, 1986

Species of fish

Mogurnda furva, the black mogurnda, is a species of fish in the family Eleotridae endemic to Lake Kutubu in Papua New Guinea. This species can reach a length of 12 cm (4.7 in).
