= Oaxaca cave sleeper =

Scientific classification
- Kingdom: Animalia
- Phylum: Chordata
- Class: Actinopterygii
- Division: Teleostei
- Order: Gobiiformes
- Family: Eleotridae
- Genus: Caecieleotris; Walsh & Chakrabarty, 2016
- Species: C. morrisi

Binomial name
- Caecieleotris morrisi S. J. Walsh & Chakrabarty, 2016

Species of fish

Caecieleotris morrisi, also known as the Oaxaca cave sleeper, is a species of troglobitic fish in the family Eleotridae found in a single cave system beneath Presa Miguel Alemán reservoir, northern State of Oaxaca in Mexico. This species is the only member of its genus.

It is only known from museum specimens that were collected in the 1990s. Since then the cave system has been flooded because of a dam. Recent surveys have not been able to relocate the species and it might be extinct.

The generic name is a compound of the Latin caecus meaning blind suffixed with Eleotris, the type genus of the Eleotridae and specific name honours the cave diver, speleologist and conservationist Thomas L. Morris who discovered this species and collected the type specimen.
