= Variegated mogurnda =

Conservation status
- Critically Endangered (IUCN 3.1)

Scientific classification
- Kingdom: Animalia
- Phylum: Chordata
- Class: Actinopterygii
- Order: Gobiiformes
- Family: Eleotridae
- Genus: Mogurnda
- Species: M. variegata

Binomial name
- Mogurnda variegata Nichols, 1951

Species of fish

The variegated mogurnda (Mogurnda variegata) is a species of fish in the family Eleotridae endemic to Lake Kutubu, Papua New Guinea. This species can reach a standard length of 13 cm (5.1 in).
