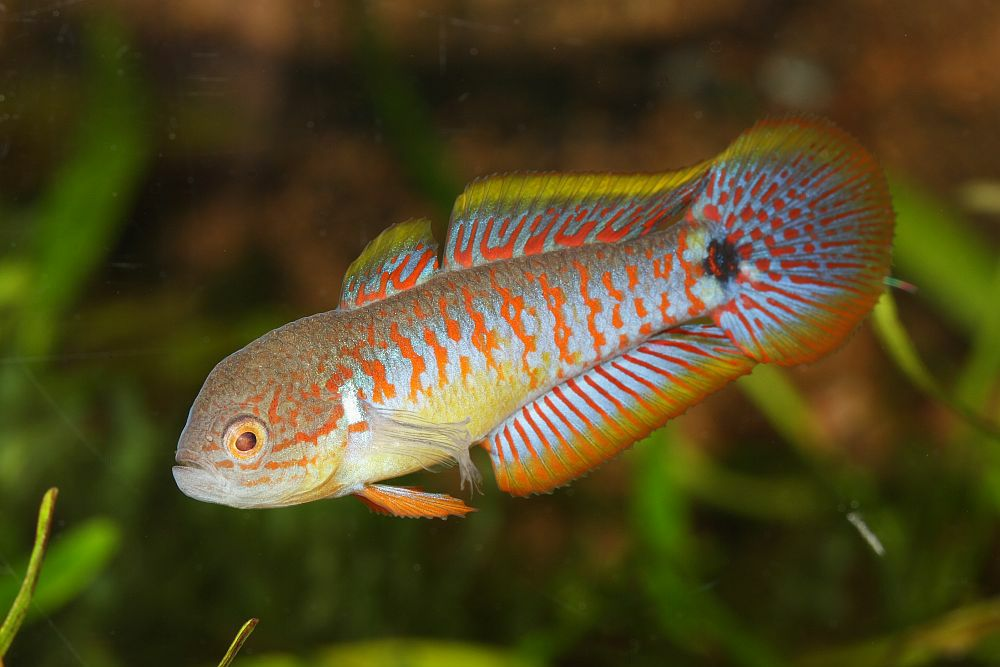
- Male
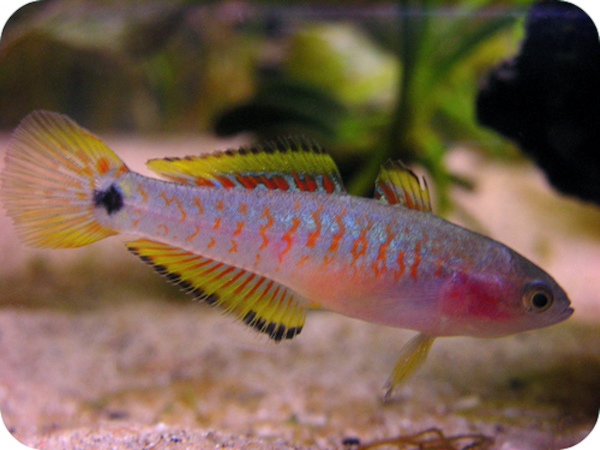
- Female

Conservation status
- Vulnerable (IUCN 3.1)

Scientific classification
- Kingdom: Animalia
- Phylum: Chordata
- Class: Actinopterygii
- Order: Gobiiformes
- Family: Eleotridae
- Genus: Tateurndina; Nichols, 1955
- Species: T. ocellicauda

Binomial name
- Tateurndina ocellicauda Nichols, 1955

= Peacock gudgeon =

Species of fish

The peacock gudgeon or peacock goby (Tateurndina ocellicauda) is a tropical freshwater species of fish in the family Eleotridae that is endemic to the eastern part of Papua New Guinea. It can be found in schools hovering over the substrate in rivers and ponds. This species can reach a length of 7.5 cm (3.0 in). It is currently the only known member of its genus.

== Name ==
Due to the lack of fused pelvic fins that are seen in true gobies, T. ocellicauda is not actually a goby and is instead placed in the family Eleotridae. Fish in this family are known as "Gudgeons".

== Coloration ==
The Body coloration of T. ocellicauda is blueish and silvery with pink, yellow and black marks along the body and fins. On the sides of the body there are red lateral dotted stripes and a yellow abdomen. On either side of the body, there is a single, large black spot near the start of the caudal fin.

== Sexual dimorphism ==
Sexual dimorphism is present in Tateurndina ocellicauda. The males will be slightly more colorful, develop a large nuchal hump on their foreheads, and will be somewhat larger than the females (7.5 cm as opposed to 5 cm).The females will have a more brightly colored yellow belly and will have a black bar running along the edges of their anal fins. The females also have a more streamlined body shape as opposed to the more round body shape seen in males.

== Feeding ==
T. ocellicauda exhibit suction feeding as they prey upon insects, insect larvae, and small crustaceans. In captivity they will accept Brine Shrimp and Bloodworms.

== Reproduction ==
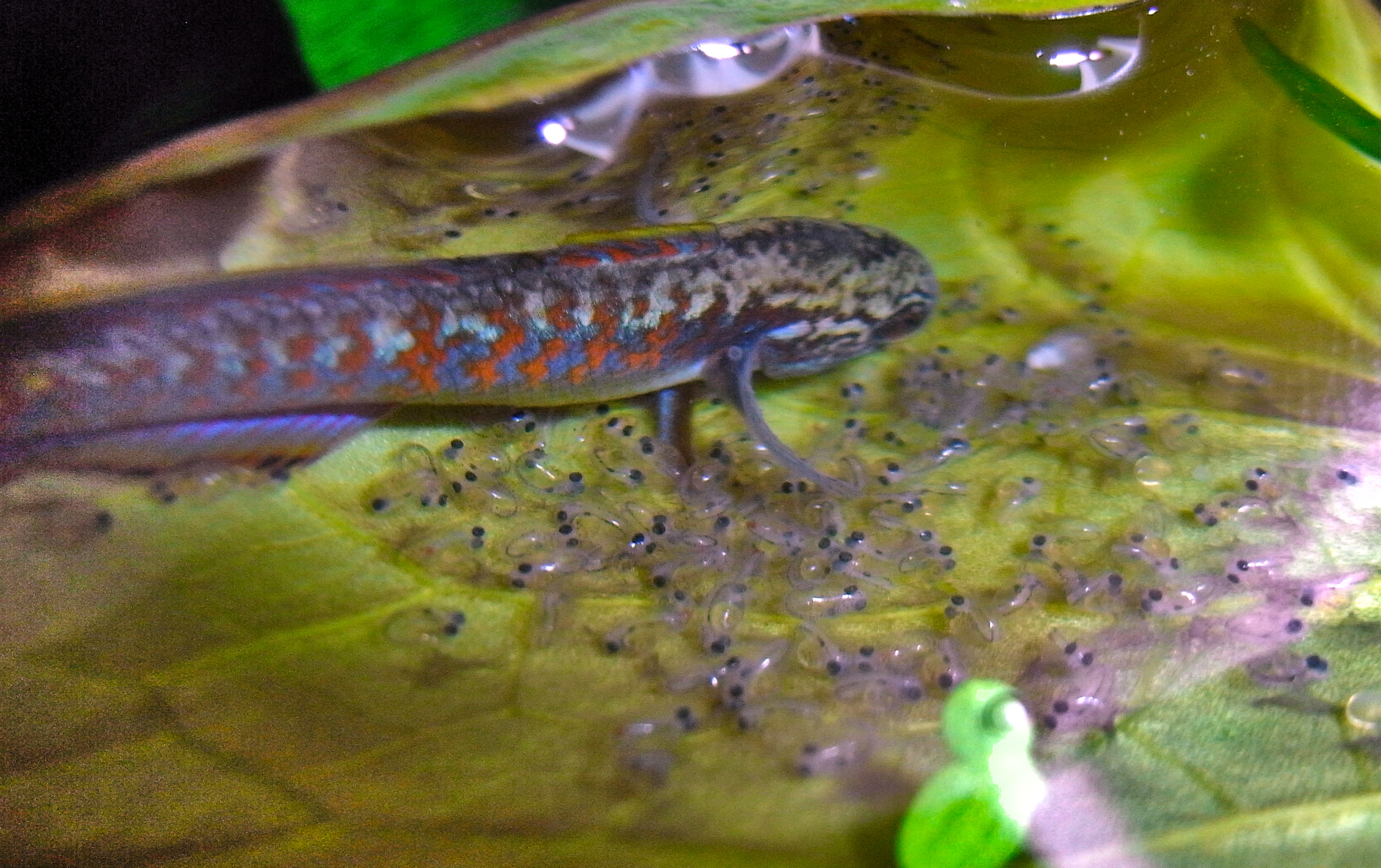
A male T. ocellicauda guards his young.

The males of T. ocellicauda will choose a spawning site, usually a cave or crevice of sorts. The males will then swim in a circular pattern near the entrance to the spawning site and will flare their pectoral fins at passing females. If unsuccessful, the male will attempt to nudge the female into the spawning site. If the female agrees to spawn, she will lay 50–100 eggs within the spawning site where she will stick the eggs to the ceiling and walls of the site with use of adhesive found on the eggs. The male will alternate between fertilizing eggs and ensuring there are no potential intruders near the entrance to the spawning site. Once all the eggs have been laid, the male will chase away the female and assume all parenting responsibilities. The male will fan the eggs with his fins for 8–10 days to ensure that they are well oxygenated and that no fungi will grow on the eggs. After 8–10 days the eggs will begin to hatch and the male will leave. After around 2 days the larvae will begin to swim on their own before reaching sexual maturity at 6–8 months.

== Captivity ==
T. ocellicauda are a peaceful addition to community tanks of 15 gallons or more. The males may be territorial to other males. Lighting should be low and there should be many places for the Gudgeons to hide and take cover. Ironically, the more cover that is available, the higher the amount of activity by the Gudgeons. PVC pipes can offer excellent spawning sites provided there are numerous plants such as Java fern nearby.
