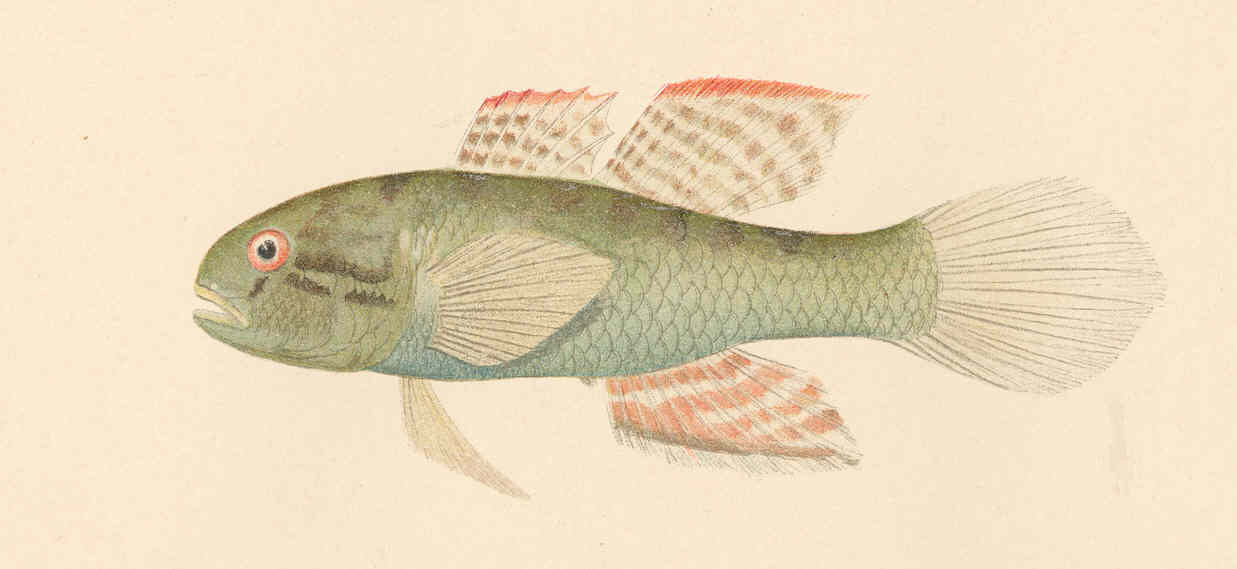
- Dormitator maculatus

Scientific classification
- Kingdom: Animalia
- Phylum: Chordata
- Class: Actinopterygii
- Order: Gobiiformes
- Family: Eleotridae
- Genus: Dormitator; T. N. Gill, 1861

Type species
- Eleotris somnulentus Girard, 1858

= Dormitator =

Genus of fishes

Dormitator is a genus of fishes in the family Eleotridae found in marine, fresh and brackish waters on either side of the Atlantic Ocean, with one species occurring along the Pacific coast of the Americas.

== Species ==
There are currently 5 recognized species in this genus:

- Dormitator cubanus Ginsburg, 1953
- Dormitator latifrons (J. Richardson, 1844) (Pacific fat sleeper)
- Dormitator lebretonis (Steindachner, 1870)
- Dormitator lophocephalus Hoedeman, 1951
- Dormitator maculatus (Bloch, 1792) (Fat sleeper)
