= Lake Kutubu Rural LLG =

Local-level government in Papua New Guinea

- Country: Papua New Guinea
- Province: Southern Highlands Province
- Time zone: UTC+10 (AEST)

Lake Kutubu Rural LLG is a local-level government (LLG) of Southern Highlands Province, Papua New Guinea. Kutubuan languages are spoken in the LLG.

Lake Kutubu is located within the LLG.

== Wards ==
- 01. Dugubali
- 02. Gena'abo
- 03. Damayu
- 04. Irika
- 05. Harabiyu
- 06. Herebo
- 07. Inu
- 08. Gesege
- 09. Iorogobayu
- 10. Manu/Ward
- 11. Gobe
- 12. Hidinihia
- 13. Fiwaga
- 14. Tugiri
- 15. Kafa
- 16. Yalanda
- 17. Sisibia
- 18. Baguale
