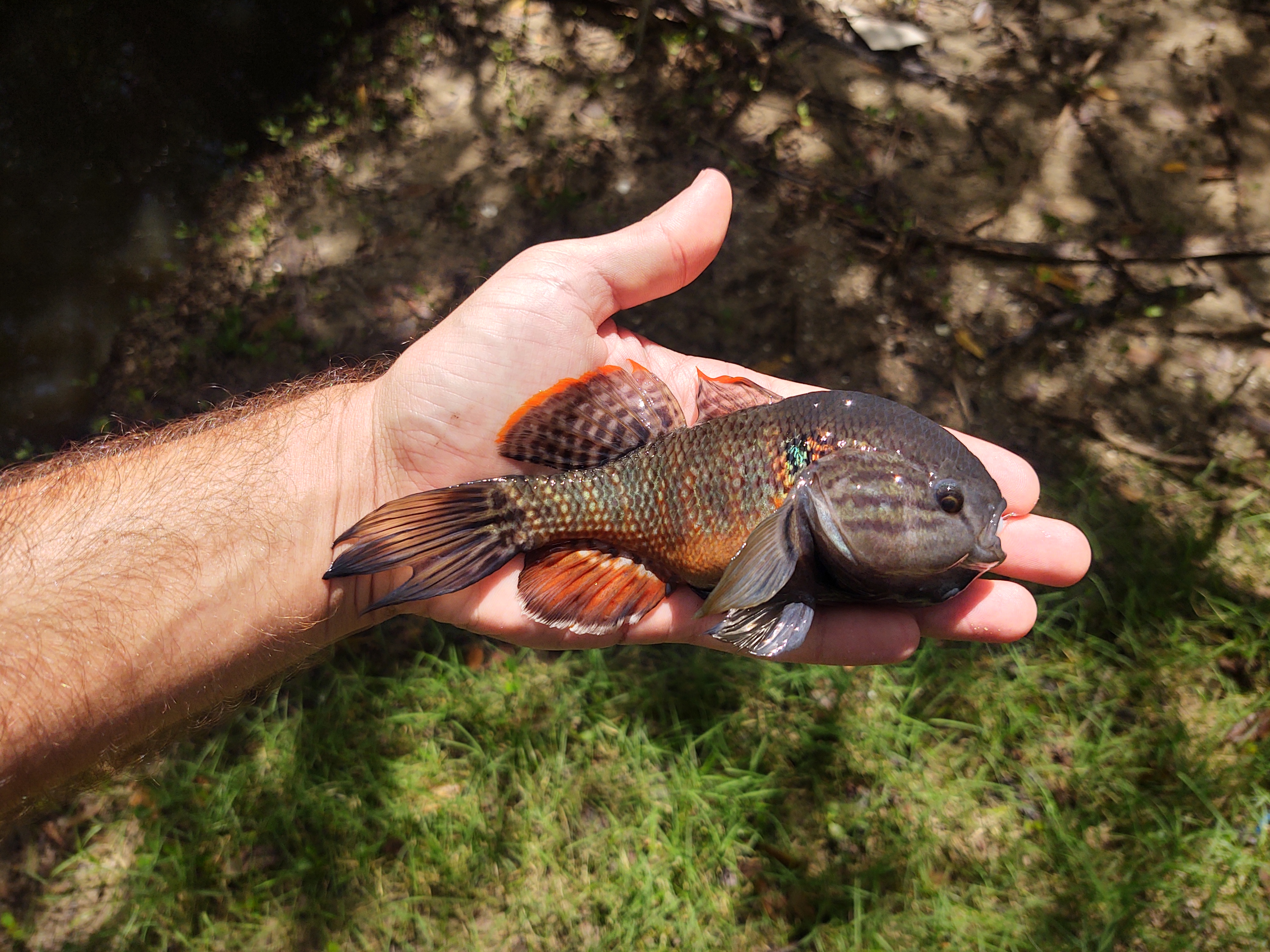
- Dormitator latifrons caught near Panama City, Panama

Conservation status
- Least Concern (IUCN 3.1)

Scientific classification
- Kingdom: Animalia
- Phylum: Chordata
- Class: Actinopterygii
- Order: Gobiiformes
- Family: Eleotridae
- Genus: Dormitator
- Species: D. latifrons

Binomial name
- Dormitator latifrons (J. Richardson, 1844)

Synonyms
- Eleotris latifrons J. Richardson, 1844; Hemieleotris carmenensis Nichols, 1952; Dormitator latifrons mexicanus Ginsburg, 1953

= Dormitator latifrons =

Species of fish

Dormitator latifrons, the Pacific fat sleeper, is a species of fish in the family Eleotridae found on the Pacific coast of the Americas from around Palos Verdes, California, to Peru, where it can be found in stagnant or sluggish fresh or brackish waters or nearby marine waters. Males of this species can reach a length of 41 cm (16 in), while females grow to 39 cm (15 in). Most do not exceed 25 cm (9.8 in). A maximum weight of 1.2 kg (2.6 lb) has been recorded. This species is important to local commercial fisheries and is actively farmed.
