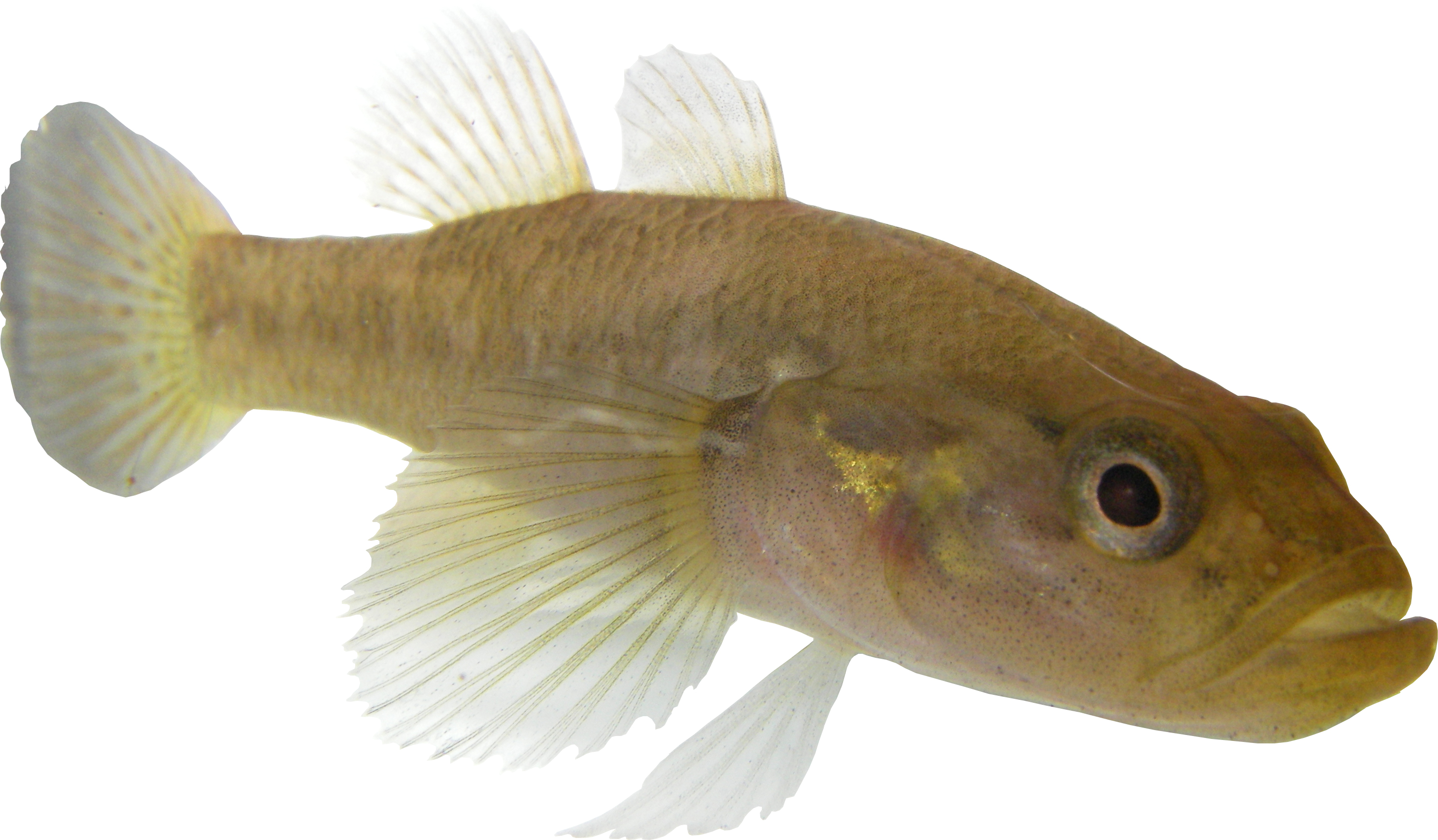

Conservation status
- Data Deficient (IUCN 3.1)

Scientific classification
- Kingdom: Animalia
- Phylum: Chordata
- Class: Actinopterygii
- Order: Gobiiformes
- Family: Eleotridae
- Genus: Ratsirakia; Maugé, 1984
- Species: R. legendrei

Binomial name
- Ratsirakia legendrei (Pellegrin, 1919)

Synonyms
- Eleotris legendrei Pellegrin, 1919

= Ratsirakia legendrei =

Species of fish

Ratsirakia legendrei is a species of fish in the family Eleotridae endemic to fresh waters of Madagascar. This species can reach a length of 17 cm (6.7 in). It is the only known member of its genus. It is the only species in the monotypic genus Ratsirakia, the name of which honours Didier Ratsiraka (b. 1933) who was President of Madagascar from 1975 to 1993 and from 1997 to 2002 while the specific name refers to the French physician Jean Legendre who discovered the species while serving with French colonial troops in Madagascar.
