= Mataichthys =

Mataichthys Temporal range: Early Miocene

Scientific classification
- Kingdom: Animalia
- Phylum: Chordata
- Class: Actinopterygii
- Order: Gobiiformes
- Family: Eleotridae
- Genus: †Mataichthys; Schwarzhans et al., 2012

Extinct genus of fishes

Mataichthys is an extinct genus of sleeper gobies which lived in what is now New Zealand in the early Miocene period. It was described by Werner Schwarzhans, R. Paul Scofield, Alan J. D. Tennyson, Jennifer P. Worthy and Trevor H. Worthy in 2012, and contains the species Mataichthys bictenatus, Mataichthys procerus, Mataichthys rhinoceros, and Mataichthys taurinus.
