= Leptophilypnus =

Scientific classification
- Kingdom: Animalia
- Phylum: Chordata
- Class: Actinopterygii
- Order: Gobiiformes
- Family: Eleotridae
- Genus: Leptophilypnus; Meek & Hildebrand, 1916

Type species
- Leptophilypnus fluviatilis Meek & Hildebrand, 1916

Genus of fishes

Leptophilypnus is a genus of small fishes in the family Eleotridae native to fresh and brackish water in Central America.

== Species ==
The recognized species in this genus are:

- Leptophilypnus fluviatilis Meek & Hildebrand, 1916
- Leptophilypnus guatemalensis Thacker & Pezold, 2006
- Leptophilypnus panamensis (Meek & Hildebrand, 1916)
