= Allomogurnda =

Scientific classification
- Kingdom: Animalia
- Phylum: Chordata
- Class: Actinopterygii
- Order: Gobiiformes
- Family: Eleotridae
- Genus: Allomogurnda; G. R. Allen, 2003

Type species
- Eleotris (Odontoeleotris) nesolepis M. C. W. Weber, 1907

Genus of fishes

Allomogurnda is a genus of fishes in the family Eleotridae native to freshwater habitats of New Guinea and surrounding smaller islands.

== Species ==
The recognized species in this genus are:

- Allomogurnda flavimarginata G. R. Allen, 2003
- Allomogurnda hoesei G. R. Allen, 2003
- Allomogurnda insularis G. R. Allen, 2003
- Allomogurnda landfordi G. R. Allen, 2003
- Allomogurnda montana G. R. Allen, 2003
- Allomogurnda nesolepis (M. C. W. Weber, 1907) (yellowbelly gudgeon)
- Allomogurnda papua G. R. Allen, 2003
- Allomogurnda sampricei G. R. Allen, 2003
