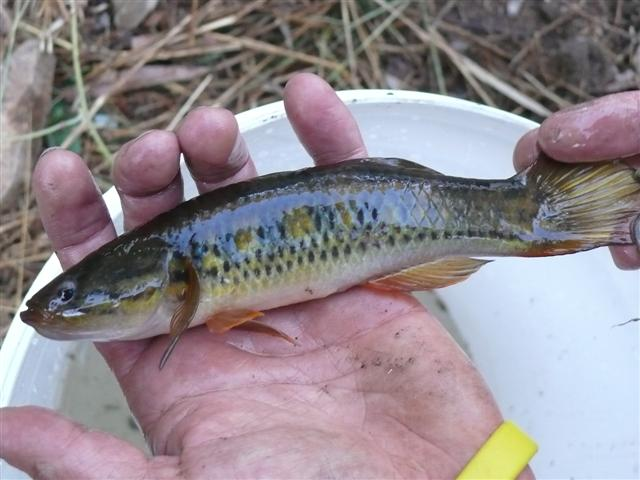
- Giuris margaritaceus

Scientific classification
- Kingdom: Animalia
- Phylum: Chordata
- Class: Actinopterygii
- Order: Gobiiformes
- Family: Eleotridae
- Genus: Giuris; Sauvage, 1880

= Giuris =

Genus of fish

Giuris is a genus of fish in the family Eleotridae found in tropical areas of the Indian Ocean and Pacific Ocean.

== Species ==
The genus has been considered monotypic, with Giuris margaritaceus as the only species. However, after a recent review of genetic and morphometric evidence, eight species are recognized:

- Giuris aporocephalus (Macleay, 1884)
- Giuris caussei Keith, Mennesson & Lord, 2020
- Giuris charpini Keith & Mennesson, 2020
- Giuris laglaizei (Sauvage, 1880)
- Giuris margaritaceus (Valenciennes, 1837)
- Giuris tolsoni (Bleeker, 1854)
- Giuris viator Keith, Mennesson, Lord & Hubert, 2020
- Giuris yahayai Keith & Mennesson, 2020
