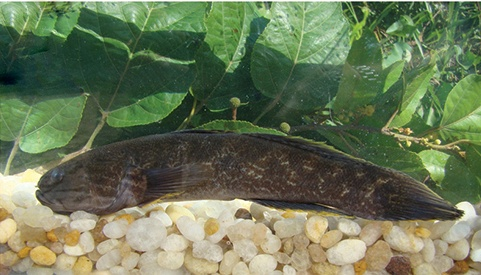
- Guavina guavina

Scientific classification
- Kingdom: Animalia
- Phylum: Chordata
- Class: Actinopterygii
- Order: Gobiiformes
- Family: Eleotridae
- Genus: Guavina; Bleeker, 1874

Type species
- Eleotris guavina Valenciennes, 1837

= Guavina =

Genus of fishes

Guavina is a genus of fishes in the family Eleotridae native to fresh, marine, and brackish waters of the Pacific and Atlantic coasts of the Americas.

== Species ==
The recognized species in this genus are:

- Guavina guavina (Valenciennes, 1837) (guavina)
- Guavina micropus Ginsburg, 1953
