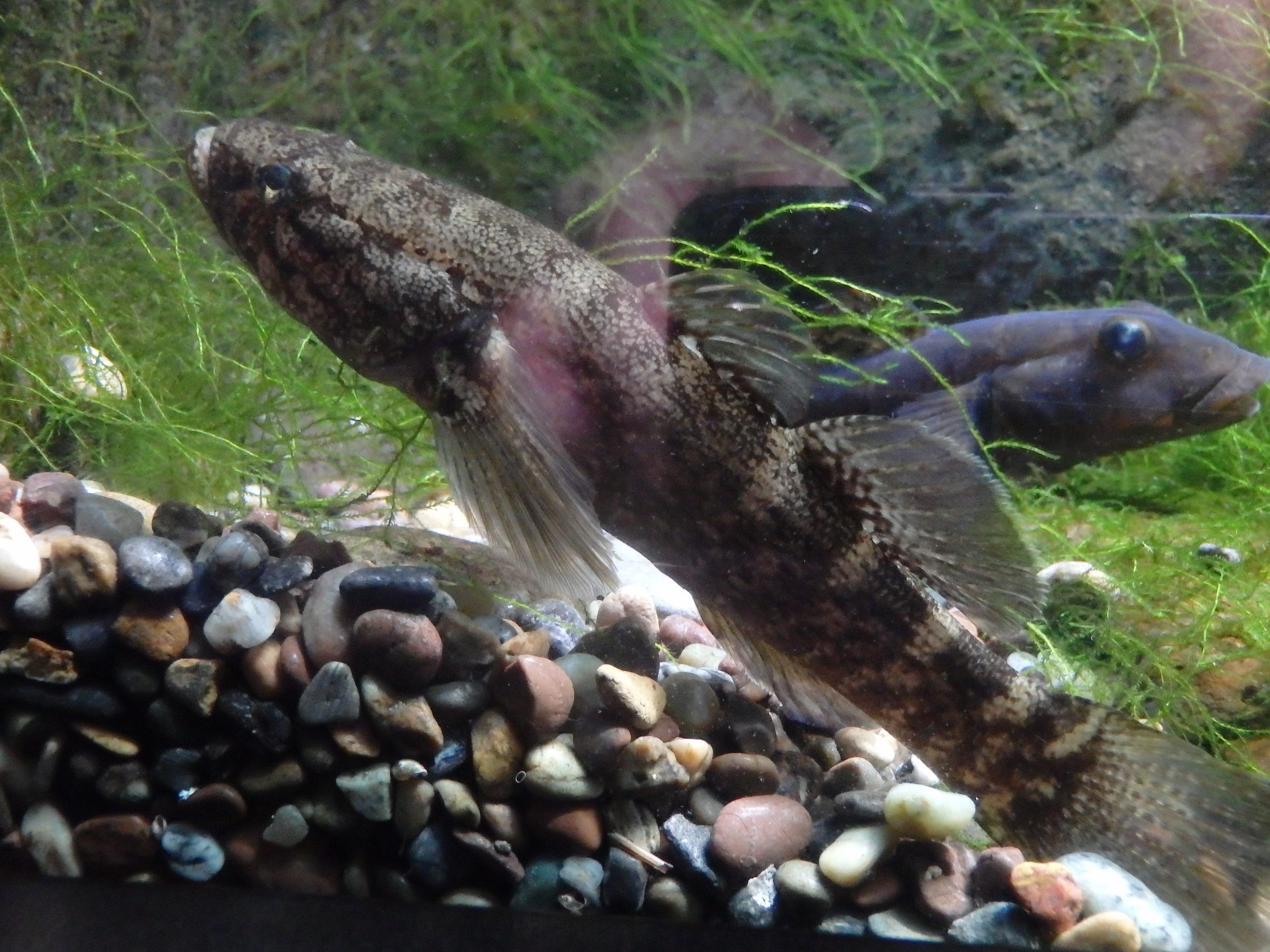

Conservation status
- Data Deficient (IUCN 3.1)

Scientific classification
- Kingdom: Animalia
- Phylum: Chordata
- Class: Actinopterygii
- Order: Gobiiformes
- Family: Eleotridae
- Genus: Eleotris
- Species: E. sandwicensis

Binomial name
- Eleotris sandwicensis Vaillant & Sauvage, 1875

= Eleotris sandwicensis =

Species of fish

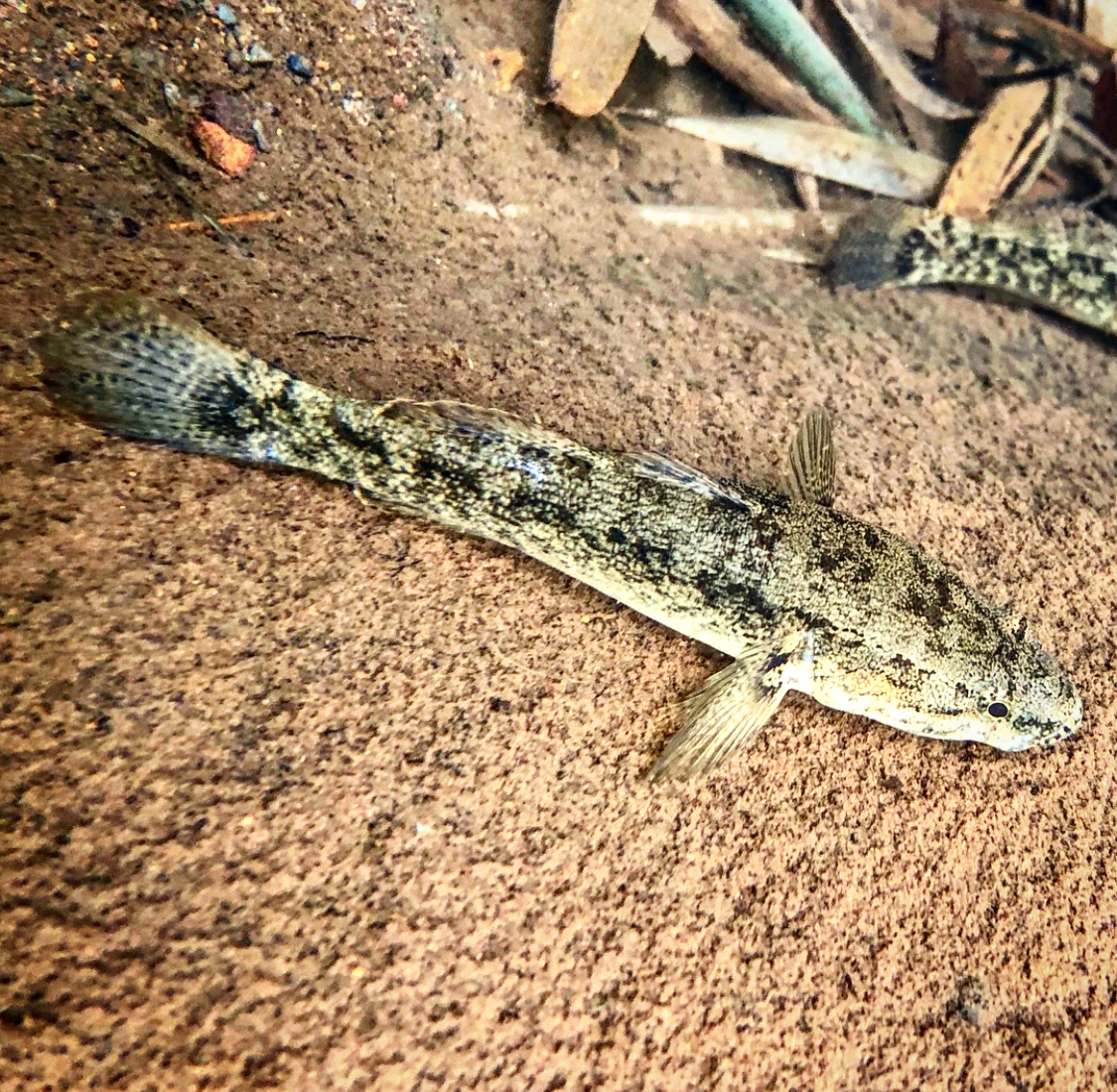
ʻoʻopu akupa (Eleotris sandwicensis) in its natural environment on Kauaʻi, Hawaiʻi

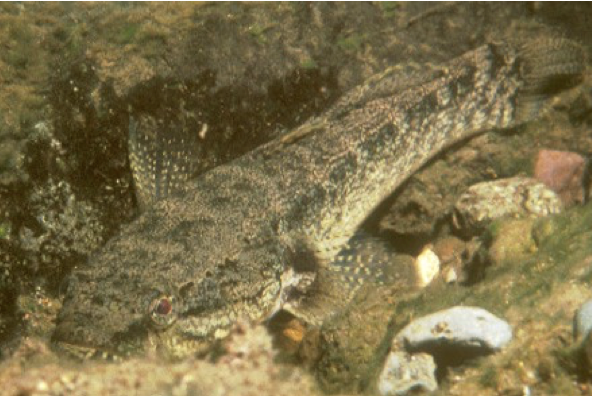
Eleotris sandwicensis

Eleotris sandwicensis, commonly known as the Sandwich Island sleeper, the Hawaiian sleeper, or oʻopu, is a species of fish in the family Eleotridae. Endemic to the Hawaiian Islands, it can be found in marine, fresh, and brackish waters around the coast. Due to this capability of migrating between different marine environments, it is considered amphidromous. Eleotris sandwicensis is a dorso-ventrally flattened fish, almost like a smaller catfish. It varies in color, but is most commonly darker black/gray or brown with green/yellow spots surrounding its body. This fish can reach a length of 33 cm (13 in). It is locally important to commercial fisheries and is also used as bait by fishermen after larger fishes. In the Hawaiian language, the fish is also known as ʻoau, ʻowau, and hiʻu kole.

== Anatomy and morphology ==
Eleotris sandwicensis is an ambush predator that uses suction to hunt its prey. Like other species that rely on suction to capture prey, Eleotris sandwicensis has enhanced cranial muscles and level mechanism that controls its highly kinetic feeding apparatus. The distribution of E. sandwicensis is limited as this species does not have the ability to travel upstream of steep waterfalls due to their lack of pelvic fins.

== Distribution ==
Eleotris sandwicensis is an endemic species of Hawaii that inhabits estuarine regions.

== Habitat ==
This species can be found in the lower parts of streams and in the ocean as hatchlings, proceeding into the lower part of streams soon after. Within the streams Eleotris sandwicensis is most commonly found in pools, runs, and fast riffles.

== Reproduction ==
Eleotris sandwicensis releases eggs into the streams that it inhabits. After these eggs hatch, the larvae begin to move downstream towards the ocean. In the ocean, the larvae live for the next five months until they are ready to migrate back into fresh water streams, where they will reside for the rest of their lives.

During these reproductive cycles, Eleotris sandwicensis can produce anywhere between 5000 and 55000 eggs.

== Diet ==
Eleotris sandwicensis is considered an ambush predator that uses suction to hunt its prey. When hunting Eleotris sandwicensis will eat any type of fish or insects it can find.

== Threats ==
Birds and other native fish are all predators to Eleotris sandwicensis. Some examples of threats to Eleotris sandwicensis are the black-crowned night heron (Nycticorax nycticorax), āholehole (Kuhlia marginata) and the silvermouth trevally (Ulua aurochs). Other dangers that Eleotris sandwicensis can encounter include the degradation of the estuarine regions and invasive species. The degradation of estuarine regions will not affect the species itself but its ability to reproduce, through the degradation of the habitat the flow of water may not function how it previously did causing delays or prevention of larvae ability to travel into the ocean and come back to the streams after their five month period at sea. With the introduction of invasive species come unknown diseases and parasites, as well as the invasive species itself being a direct threat to the species whether it be through attacking the species or stealing the food of the species. With all these factors the introduction of a new species can drastically affect any species due to the many variables introduced when they arrive.

== Human use ==
This species is consumed and used for bait to catch pāpio which are younger Ulua aurochs.
