= Hemieleotris =

Scientific classification
- Kingdom: Animalia
- Phylum: Chordata
- Class: Actinopterygii
- Order: Gobiiformes
- Family: Eleotridae
- Genus: Hemieleotris; Meek & Hildebrand, 1916

Type species
- Eleotris latifasciatus Meek & Hildebrand, 1912

Genus of fishes

Hemieleotris is a genus of small fishes in the family Eleotridae native to Central America and Colombia, where they are only found in freshwater habitats.

== Species ==
The recognized species in this genus are:

- Hemieleotris latifasciata (Meek & Hildebrand, 1912) (pygmy sleeper)
- Hemieleotris levis C. H. Eigenmann, 1918
