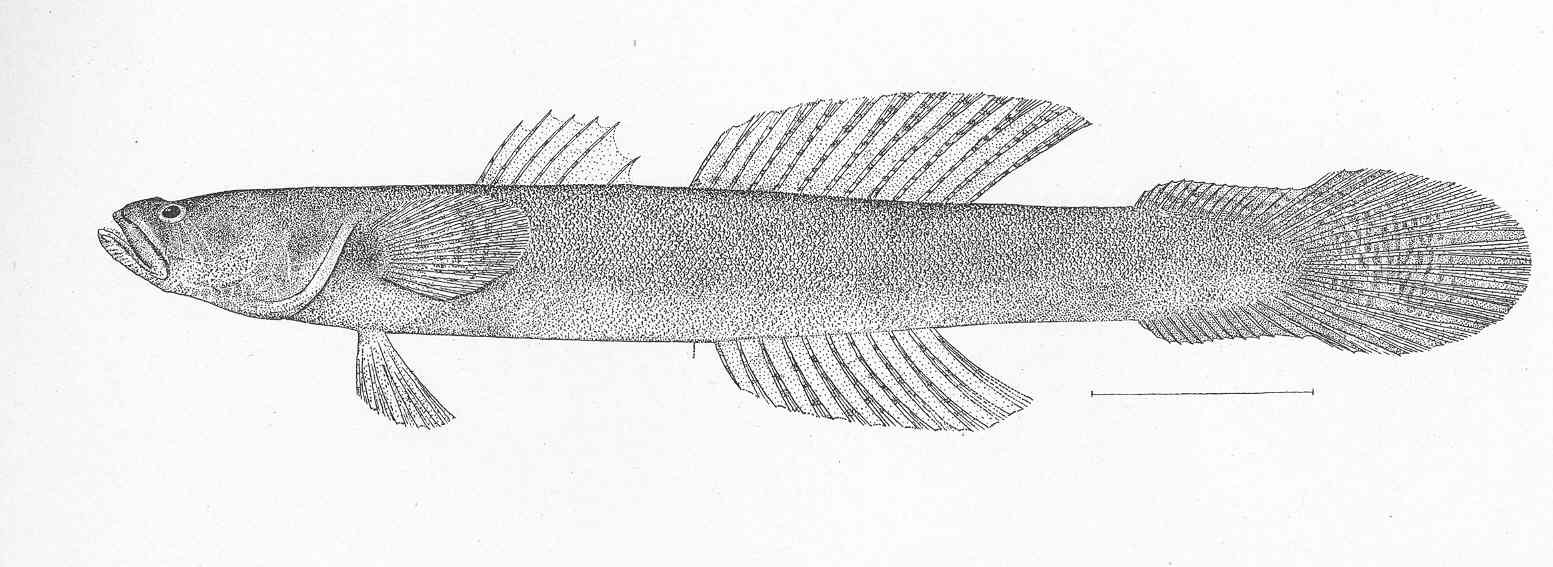
- Erotelis armiger

Scientific classification
- Domain: Eukaryota
- Kingdom: Animalia
- Phylum: Chordata
- Class: Actinopterygii
- Order: Gobiiformes
- Family: Eleotridae
- Genus: Erotelis; Poey, 1860

Type species
- Erotelis valenciennesi Poey, 1860

Synonyms
- Alexurus Jordan, 1895; Euleptoeleotris Hildebrand, 1938

= Erotelis =

Genus of fishes

Erotelis is a genus of fishes in the family Eleotridae native to the fresh, marine, and brackish coastal waters of the Americas.

== Species ==
The recognized species in this genus are:

- Erotelis armiger (D. S. Jordan & J. A. Richardson, 1895) (flathead sleeper)
- Erotelis clarki (Hildebrand, 1938)
- Erotelis shropshirei (Hildebrand, 1938)
- Erotelis smaragdus (Valenciennes, 1837) (emerald sleeper)
