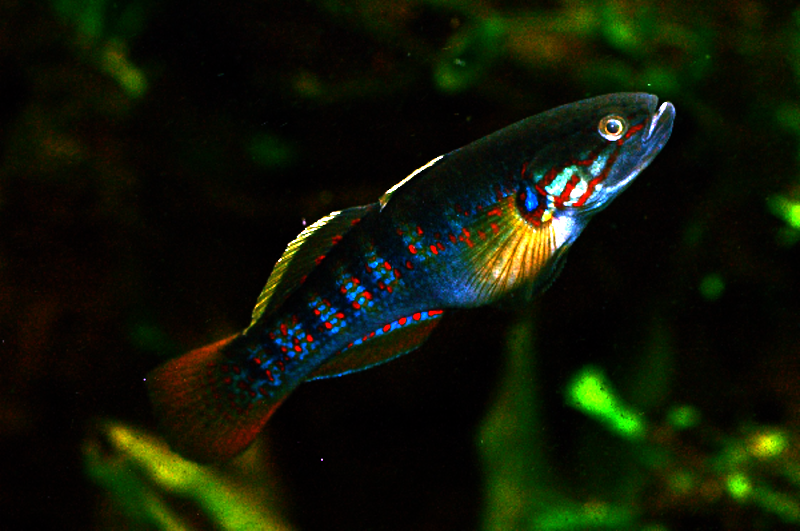

Conservation status
- Least Concern (IUCN 3.1)

Scientific classification
- Kingdom: Animalia
- Phylum: Chordata
- Class: Actinopterygii
- Order: Gobiiformes
- Family: Eleotridae
- Genus: Mogurnda
- Species: M. mogurnda

Binomial name
- Mogurnda mogurnda (J. Richardson, 1844)

Synonyms
- Eleotris mogurnda Richardson, 1844

= Mogurnda mogurnda =

Species of fish

Mogurnda mogurnda, commonly known as the northern trout gudgeon or northern purple-spotted gudgeon, is a freshwater fish native to northern Australia and New Guinea.
