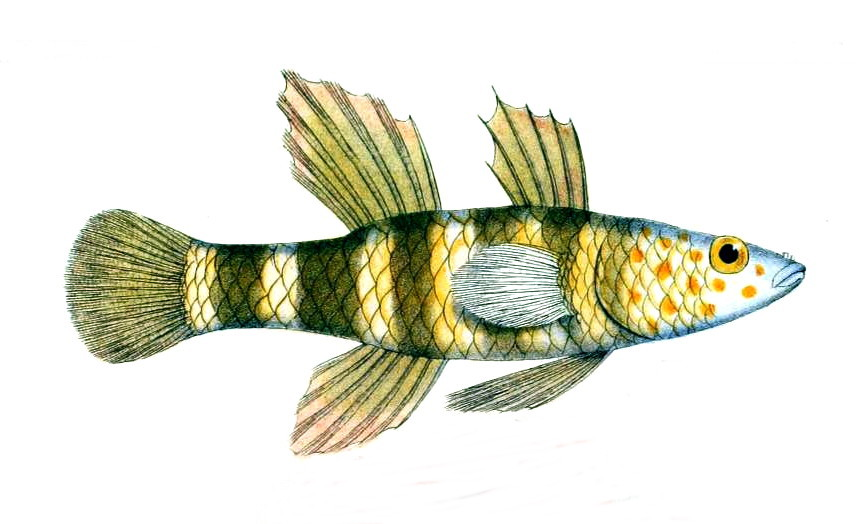
- Calumia godeffroyi

Scientific classification
- Kingdom: Animalia
- Phylum: Chordata
- Class: Actinopterygii
- Division: Teleostei
- Order: Gobiiformes
- Family: Eleotridae
- Genus: Calumia; J. L. B. Smith, 1958

Type species
- Calumia biocellata J. L. B. Smith, 1958

= Calumia =

Genus of fishes

Calumia is a genus of fishes in the family Eleotridae native to the marine waters of the Indian Ocean and the western Pacific Ocean.

== Species ==
The recognized species in this genus are:

- Calumia eilperinae G. R. Allen & Erdmann, 2010
- Calumia godeffroyi (Günther, 1877) (tailface sleeper)
- Calumia papuensis G. R. Allen & Erdmann, 2010
- Calumia profunda Larson & Hoese, 1980
