= Lake Kutubu =

Lake in Papua New Guinea

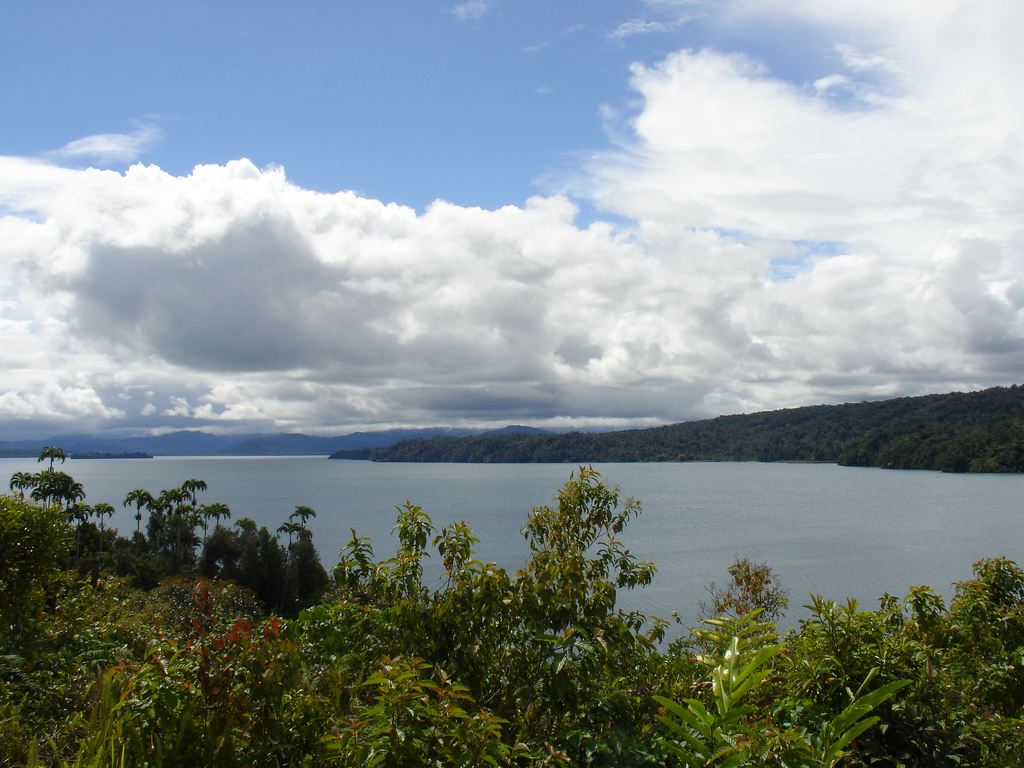

- Location within Papua New Guinea
- Location: Nipa-Kutubu District, Southern Highlands Province
- Coordinates: 6°24′S 143°20′E
- Primary inflows: underground sources, several streams, largest is Hamua Creek
- Primary outflows: Soro River
- Catchment area: 328.3 km^{2} (126.8 mi^{2})
- Basin countries: Papua New Guinea
- Max. length: 19 km (12 mi)
- Max. width: 4.5 km (2.8 mi)
- Surface area: 51.84 km^{2} (20.02 mi^{2})
- Average depth: 43.4 m (142 ft)
- Max. depth: 70 m (230 ft)
- Water volume: 2.24 km^{3} (0.54 cu mi)
- Surface elevation: 826 m (2,710 ft)

Ramsar Wetland
- Designated: 25 September 1998
- Reference no.: 961

Map

Lake Kutubu is the second-largest lake in Papua New Guinea, after Lake Murray, and, at 800 m above sea level, the largest upland body of water, with an area of 51.84 km^{2} (20.02 mi^{2}), and a total catchment area of 328.3 km^{2} (126.8 mi^{2}). Lake Kutubu and Lake Sentani form an ecoregion on the WWF's Global 200. Kutubu lies in the Southern Highlands Province of Papua New Guinea, east of the Kikori River into which it drains, and about 50 km southwest of Mendi, the provincial capital. It is one of the few lakes in the country that occurs in a depression in the rugged interior mountains. The lake has a few islands, the largest of which is Wasemi in its northern part. The water of Lake Kutubu, fed by several streams originating mostly from underground sources, is clear and reaches a depth of 70 m (230 feet). The catchment is inhabited by two main ethnic groups, the Foe to the south and the Fasu to the north. Thirty-three villages lie in the catchment area, with a total estimated population of 10,885.

The lake gave its name to the nearby Kutubu Oil Project, Papua New Guinea's first commercial oilfield development, operated by Oil Search, and which began production in 1992. The development has supported the local economy, and caused a general in-migration to the area, as well as ecological problems resulting from rapid population growth, including pollution, forest destruction and overfishing. A proposed gas pipeline and road are expected to exacerbate these problems unless they are well-managed.

== Fauna ==
Lake Kutubu includes 13 endemic fish species, making it the most unusual lacustrine habitat for fishes in the New Guinea-Australia region. The endemic fish species are:

- Kutubu tandan (Oloplotosus torobo)
- Lake Kutubu rainbowfish (Melanotaenia lacustris)
- Kutubu hardyhead (Craterocephalus lacustris)
- Adamson's grunter (Hephaestus adamsoni)
- Black mogurnda (Mogurnda furva)
- Lake Kutubu mogurnda (Mogurnda kutubuensis)
- Mogurnda maccuneae
- Mogurnda mosa
- Blotched mogurnda (Mogurnda spilota)
- Variegated mogurnda (Mogurnda variegata)
- Striped mogurnda (Mogurnda vitta)
- Two undescribed species of Glossogobius (tentatively known as "new sp. 8" and "new sp. 12")

Additionally, the Parastacid crayfish Cherax papuanus is endemic to the lake.

== Conservation ==
Because of its biodiversity and ecological significance, the area has been designated a "Wetland of International Significance" by the Ramsar Convention. The area included in this designation matches the Lake Kutubu Wildlife Management Area (240.57 km^{2}). The area is undergoing study by the World Wildlife Fund and the drafting of a catchment management plan has commenced, which is anticipated to become a model for other catchments in Papua New Guinea. The project is to be completed by December 2007. The Lake Kutubu area is also included in the tentatively listed Kikori River Basin - Great Papuan Plateau World Heritage Site.

== Languages ==
Kutubuan and other Trans-New Guinea languages are spoken in the region.

== See also ==
- Lake Kutubu Rural LLG
- Kutubuan languages
