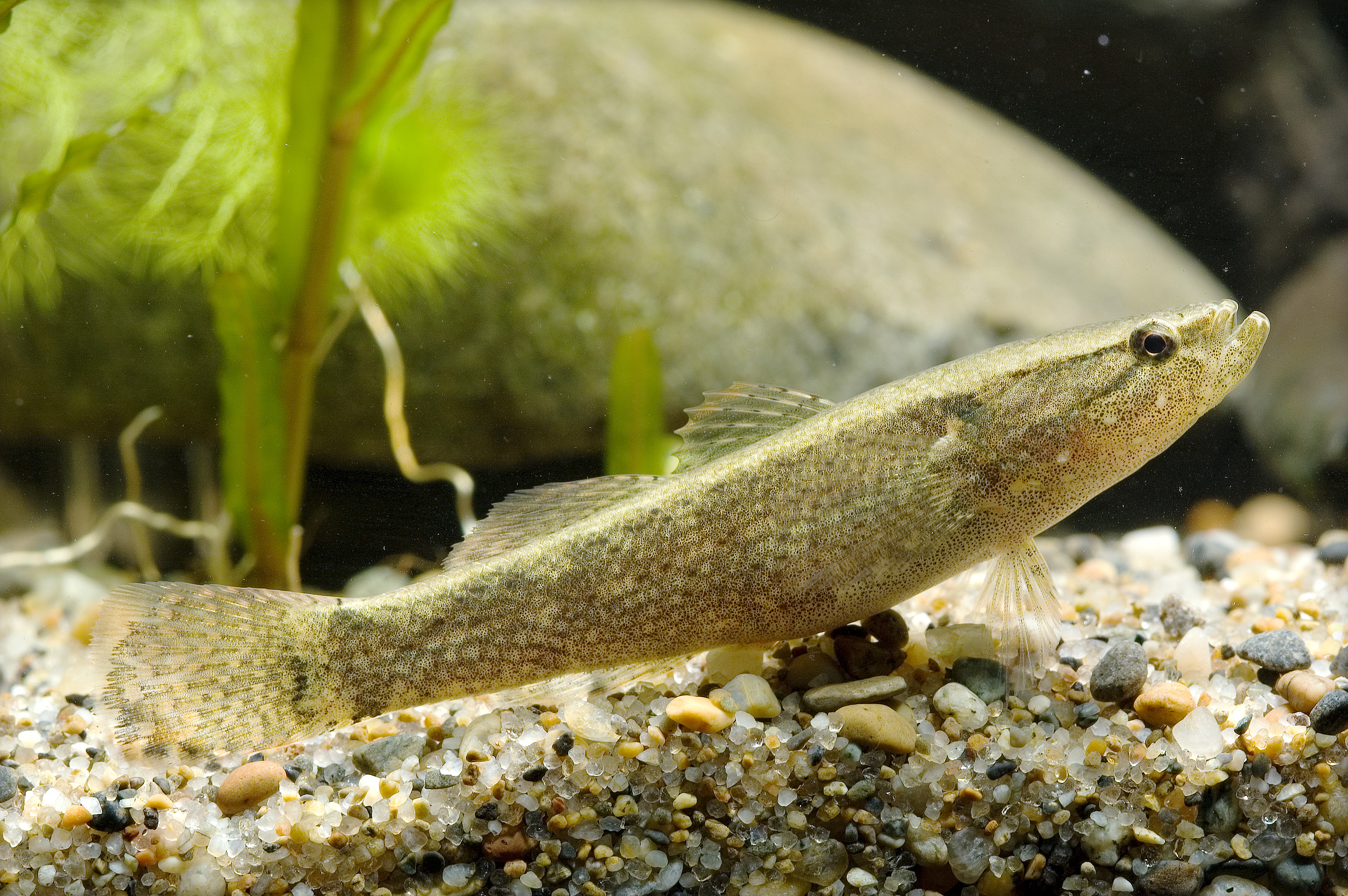
- Eleotris oxycephala

Scientific classification
- Kingdom: Animalia
- Phylum: Chordata
- Class: Actinopterygii
- Order: Gobiiformes
- Family: Eleotridae
- Genus: Eleotris; Bloch & J. G. Schneider, 1801

Type species
- Gobius pisonis J. F. Gmelin, 1789

= Eleotris =

Genus of fishes

Eleotris is a genus of fish in the family Eleotridae with a circumglobal distribution in tropical and subtropical regions.

== Species ==
There are currently 27 recognized species in this genus:

- Eleotris acanthopoma Bleeker, 1853 (Spiny sleeper)
- Eleotris amblyopsis (Cope, 1871) (Large-scaled spiny-cheek sleeper)
- Eleotris andamensis Herre, 1939
- Eleotris annobonensis Blanc, Cadenat & Stauch, 1968
- Eleotris aquadulcis G. R. Allen & Coates, 1990 (Freshwater sleeper)
- Eleotris balia D. S. Jordan & Seale, 1905
- Eleotris belizianus Sauvage, 1880
- Eleotris bosetoi Mennesson, Keith, Ebner & Gerbeaux, 2016
- Eleotris daganensis Steindachner, 1870
- Eleotris douniasi Keith, Mennesson, Dahruddin & Hubert, 2021
- Eleotris fasciatus T. R. Chen, 1964
- Eleotris feai Thys van den Audenaerde & Tortonese, 1974
- Eleotris fusca (Bloch & J. G. Schneider, 1801) (Dusky sleeper)
- Eleotris lutea F. Day, 1876 (Lutea sleeper)
- Eleotris mauritiana E. T. Bennett, 1832 (Wide-head sleeper)
- Eleotris macrolepis Bleeker, 1875
- Eleotris melanosoma Bleeker, 1853 (Broad-head sleeper)
- Eleotris oxycephala Temminck & Schlegel, 1845
- Eleotris pellegrini Maugé, 1984
- Eleotris perniger (Cope, 1871) (Small-scaled spiny-cheek sleeper)
- Eleotris picta Kner, 1863 (Spotted sleeper)
- Eleotris pisonis (J. F. Gmelin, 1789) (Spiny-cheek sleeper)
- Eleotris sandwicensis Vaillant & Sauvage, 1875 (Sandwich Island sleeper, Hawaiian sleeper, oopu)
- Eleotris senegalensis Steindachner, 1870
- Eleotris soaresi Playfair, 1867
- Eleotris sumatraensis Mennesson, Keith, Sukmono, Risdawati & Hubert, 2021
- Eleotris tecta W. A. Bussing, 1996
- Eleotris tubularis Heller & Snodgrass, 1903
- Eleotris vittata A. H. A. Duméril, 1861
- Eleotris vomerodentata Maugé, 1984
- Eleotris woworae Keith, Mennesson, Sauri & Hubert, 2021
