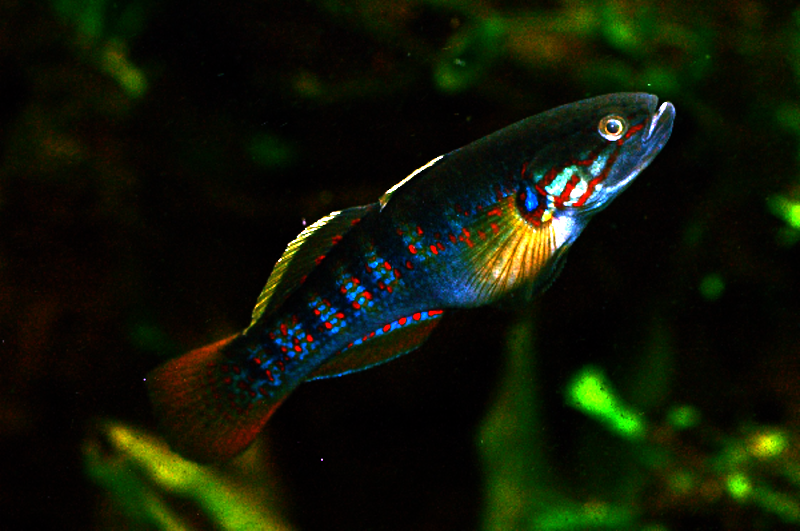
- Mogurnda mogurnda

Scientific classification
- Kingdom: Animalia
- Phylum: Chordata
- Class: Actinopterygii
- Division: Teleostei
- Order: Gobiiformes
- Suborder: Gobioidei
- Family: Eleotridae; Bonaparte, 1835

= Eleotridae =

Eleotridae Temporal range: Early Miocene–present

Family of fishes

Eleotridae is a family of fish commonly known as sleeper gobies, with about 34 genera and 180 species. Most species are found in the tropical Indo-Pacific region, but there are also species in subtropical and temperate regions, warmer parts of the Americas and near the Atlantic coast in Africa. Many eleotrids pass through a planktonic stage in the sea; the majority live as adults in freshwater streams and brackish water, although some spend their entire lives in the sea. One of its genera, Caecieleotris, is troglobitic. They are especially important as predators in the freshwater stream ecosystems on oceanic islands such as New Zealand and Hawaii that otherwise lack the predatory fish families typical of nearby continents, such as catfish. Anatomically, they are similar to the gobies (Gobiidae), though unlike the majority of gobies, they do not have a pelvic sucker.

Like the true gobies, they are generally small fish that live on the substrate, often amongst vegetation, in burrows, or in crevices within rocks and coral reefs. Although goby-like in many ways, sleeper gobies lack the pelvic fin sucker and that, together with other morphological differences, is used to distinguish the two families. The Gobiidae and Eleotridae likely share a common ancestor and they are both placed in the order Gobiiformes, along with a few other small families containing goby-like fishes.

Dormitator and Eleotris, two of the most widespread and typical genera, include a variety of species that inhabit marine, estuarine and freshwater habitats. Among the largest members of the family are predatory species such as the bigmouth sleeper (Gobiomorus dormitor) at up to 90 cm (3.0 ft) from freshwater near the West Atlantic region. However, most are much smaller, such as the fresh- and brackish-water species from Australia and New Guinea, including Hypseleotris, known locally as gudgeons (not to be confused with the Eurasian freshwater cyprinid Gobio gobio, also known as the gudgeon and after which the Australian sleeper gobies were likely named). A few of these, such as the empire gudgeon (H. compressa) and peacock gudgeon (Tateurndina ocellicauda), are sometimes kept in aquariums. The smallest in the family are the Amazonian Leptophilypnion with a standard length of less than 1 cm (0.4 in).

Fossil remains of the extinct freshwater eleotrid Mataichthys have been identified from the Early Miocene of New Zealand. The extinct Oligocene-aged genus Pirskenius from Europe has sometimes been placed in the Eleotridae, which would make it the earliest known member of the family, but more recent analyses have disputed this and support placing it in its own family.

== Taxonomy ==
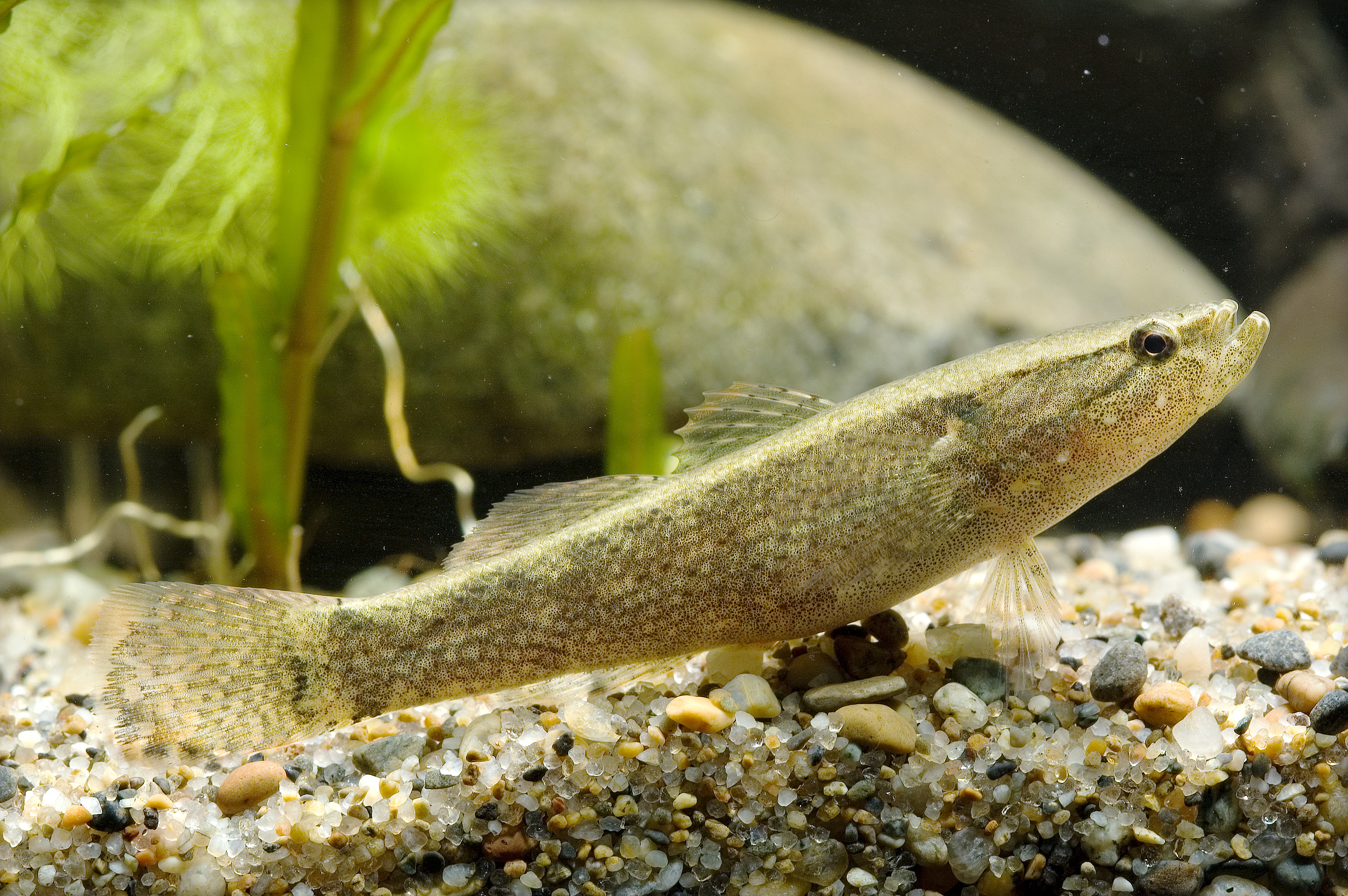
Eleotris oxycephala

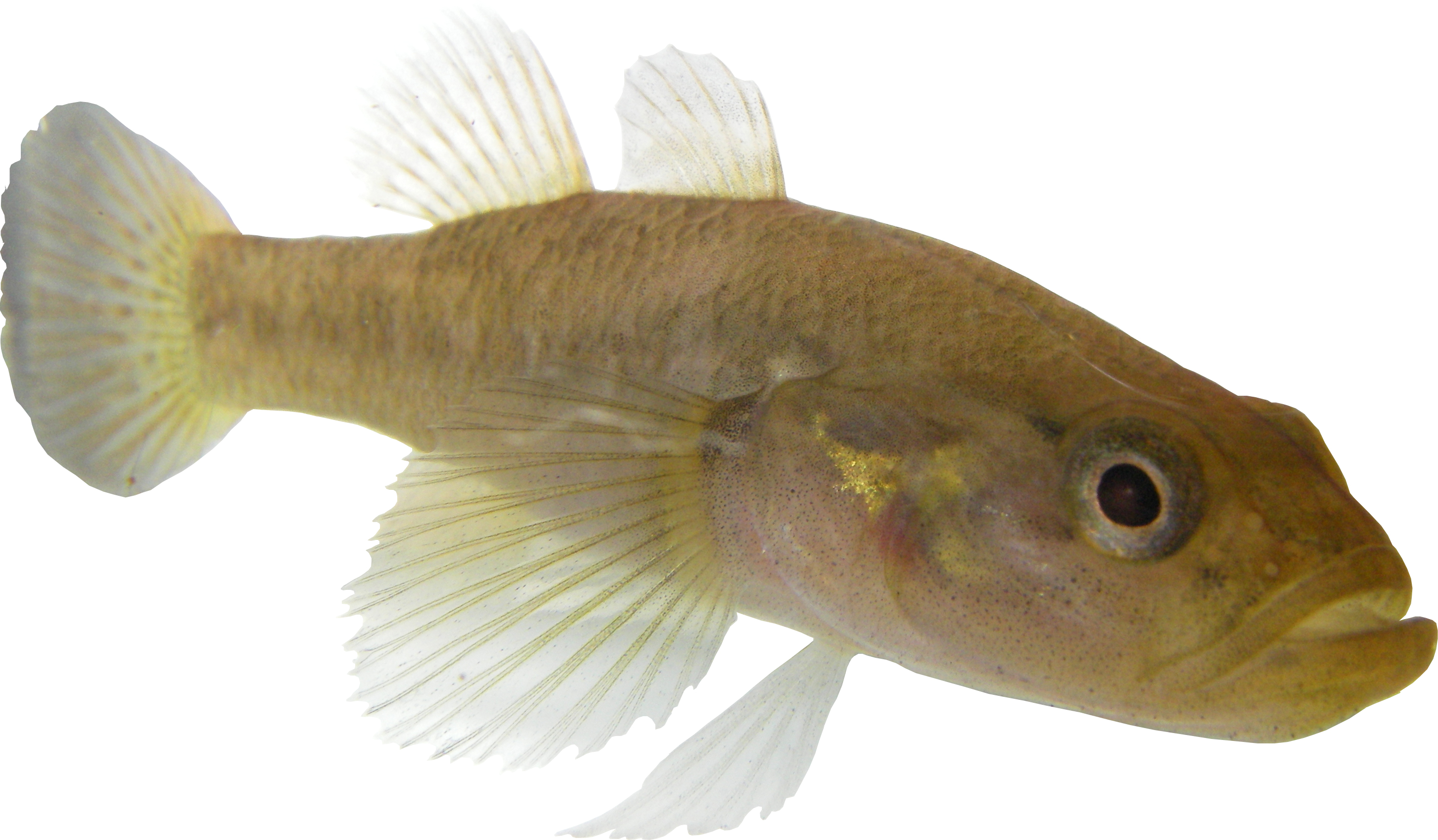
Ratsirakia legendrei

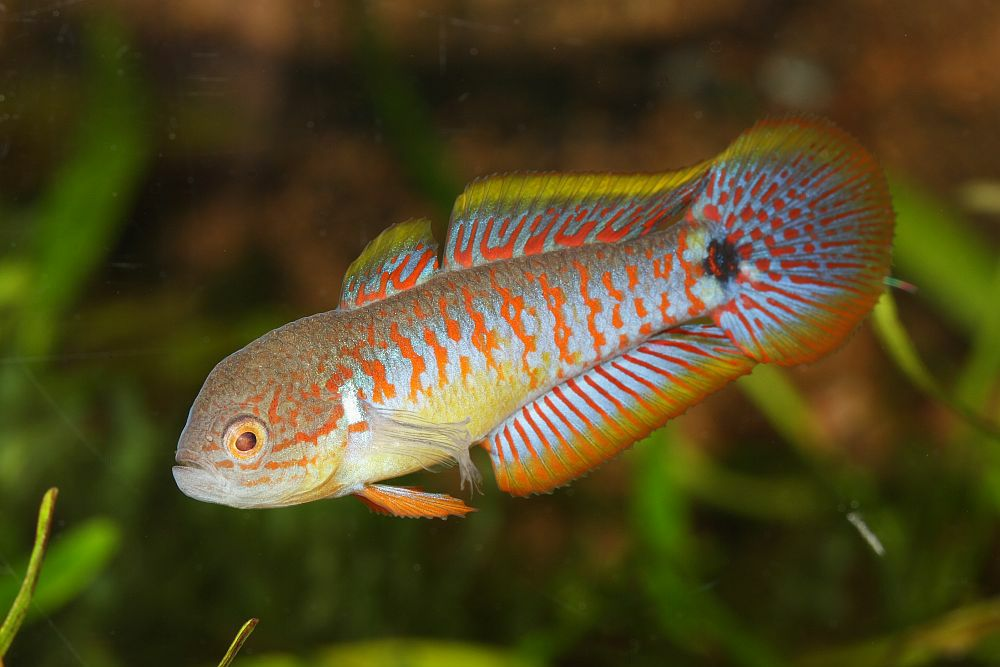
Tateurndina ocellicauda

The family has been divided into three subfamilies: Butinae, Eleotrinae and Milyeringinae. However, because of the deep divergence between the three, some authorities have recommended splitting them into separate families: Butidae, Eleotridae and Milyeringidae. The 5th edition of Fishes of the World follows this classification and this means that the following genera are currently included within the Eleotridae. However, the family Xenisthmidae is regarded as a synonym of the Eleotridae, according to the 5th Edition of Fishes of the World.

- Allomogurnda Allen, 2003
- Belobranchus Bleeker, 1857
- Bunaka Herre, 1927
- Caecieleotris Walsh & Chakrabarty, 2016
- Calumia J. L. B. Smith, 1958
- Dormitator Gill, 1861
- Eleotris Bloch & Schneider, 1801
- Erotelis Poey, 1860
- Giuris Sauvage, 1880
- Gobiomorphus Gill, 1863
- Gobiomorus Lacépède, 1800
- Guavina Bleeker, 1874
- Hemieleotris Meek & Hildebrand, 1916
- Hypseleotris Gill, 1863
- Kimberleyeleotris Hoese & Allen, 1987
- Leptophilypnion Roberts, 2013
- Leptophilypnus Meek & Hildebrand, 1916
- Microphilypnus Myers, 1927
- Mogurnda Gill, 1863
- Philypnodon Bleeker, 1874
- Ratsirakia Maugé, 1984
- Tateurndina Nichols, 1955
- †Mataichthys Schwarzhans et al., 2012
