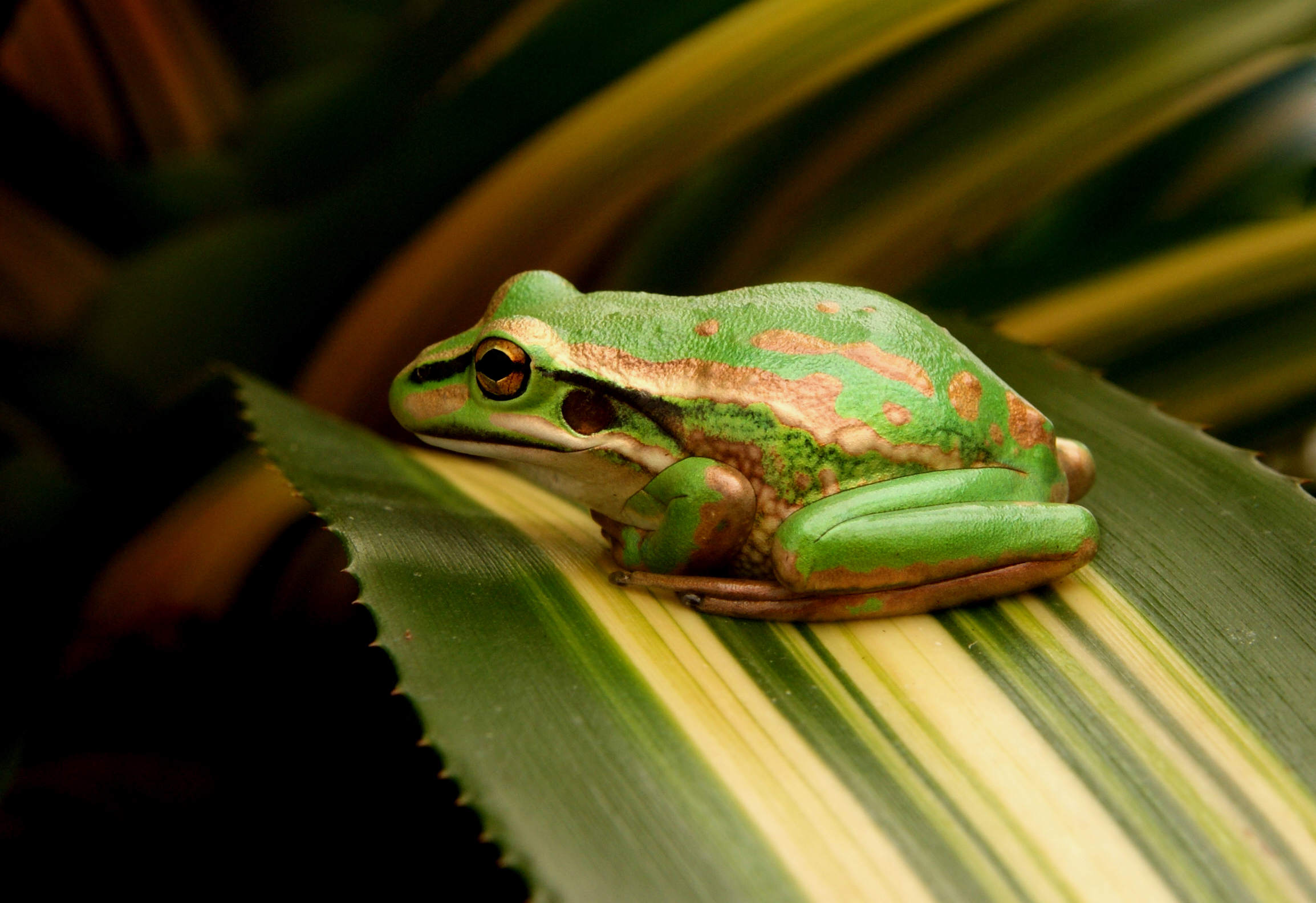

Conservation status
- Near Threatened (IUCN 3.1)

Scientific classification
- Kingdom: Animalia
- Phylum: Chordata
- Class: Amphibia
- Order: Anura
- Family: Pelodryadidae
- Genus: Ranoidea
- Species: R. aurea

Binomial name
- Ranoidea aurea (Lesson, 1829)

Synonyms
- Litoria aurea (Günther, 1864) Fanchonia elegans Werner, 1893; Hyla blandsuttoni Procter, 1924; Hyla jacksonii Duméril, Bibron & Duméril, 1854; Rana aurea Lesson, 1829; Ranoidea jacksoniensis Tschudi, 1838; Ranoidea resplendens Girard, 1853

= Green and golden bell frog =

Species of amphibian

The green and golden bell frog (Ranoidea aurea), also named the green bell frog, green and golden swamp frog and green frog, is a species of ground-dwelling tree frog native to eastern Australia. Despite its classification and climbing abilities, it does not live in trees and spends almost all of its time close to ground level. It can reach up to 11 cm (4.5 in) in length, making it one of Australia's largest frogs.

Coloured gold and green, the frogs are voracious eaters of insects, but will also eat larger prey, such as worms and mice. They are mainly diurnal, although this is mostly to warm in the sun. They tend to be less active in winter except in warmer or wetter periods, and breed in the warmer months. Males reach maturity after around 9 months, while for the larger females, this does not occur until they are two years old. The frogs can engage in cannibalism, and males frequently attack and injure one another if they infringe on one another's space.

Many populations, particularly in the Sydney region, inhabit areas of infrequent disturbance, such as golf courses, disused industrial land, brick pits, and landfill areas. Though once one of the most common frogs in south-east Australia, the green and golden bell frog has endured major population declines, particularly in highland areas, leading to its current classification as globally endangered. Its numbers have continued to fall and are threatened by habitat loss and degradation, pollution, introduced species, and parasites and pathogens, including the chytrid Batrachochytrium dendrobatidis. As most of the remaining populations live on private land, the logistics of the conservation effort can be complicated. Despite the situation in Australia, some frog populations have survived with more success in New Zealand and several other Pacific islands, where it has been introduced. However, even in these areas the population of green and golden bell has been rapidly declining in the past few decades.

== Taxonomy ==
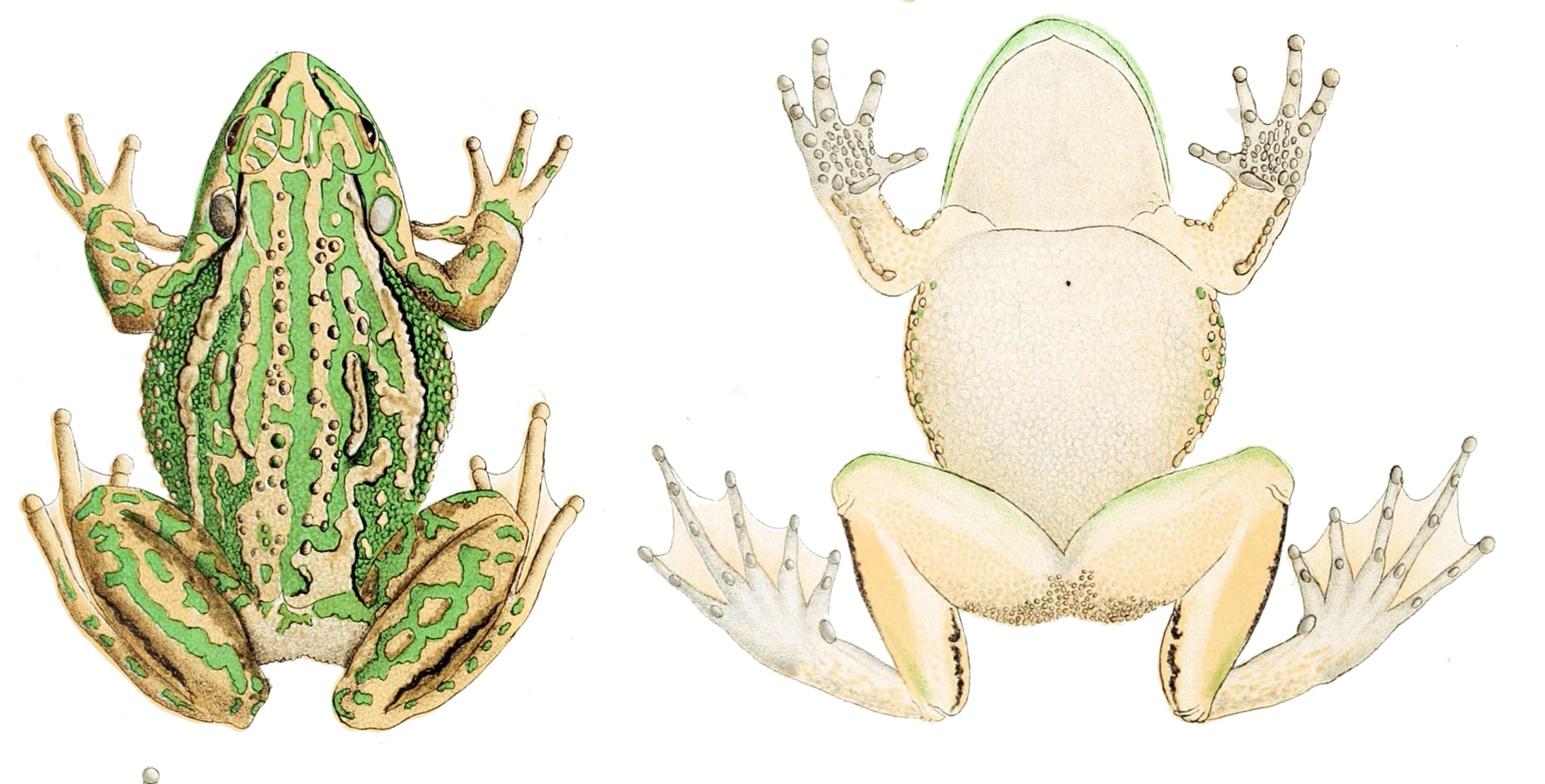
Profile and dorsal views of a green and golden bell frog

The common name, "green and golden bell frog", was first adopted by Harold Cogger in his 1975 book Reptiles and Amphibians of Australia. Before this, its common names were "golden frog" and "golden tree frog". The green and golden bell frog has many physical and behavioural characteristics representative of ranids, hence its original classification as Rana. It has a pointy snout, long legs, and almost complete toe webbing; the tympanum is large and distinct; and the overall body shape is similar to many Rana species. Like many frogs in the genus Rana, green and golden bell frogs are mostly aquatic, and only travel over land during periods of rainfall. It was removed from the genus because of anatomical differences with the family Ranidae. The bone and cartilage structural formations of the green and golden bell frog are closest to those of species in the family Hylidae; it was therefore reclassified.

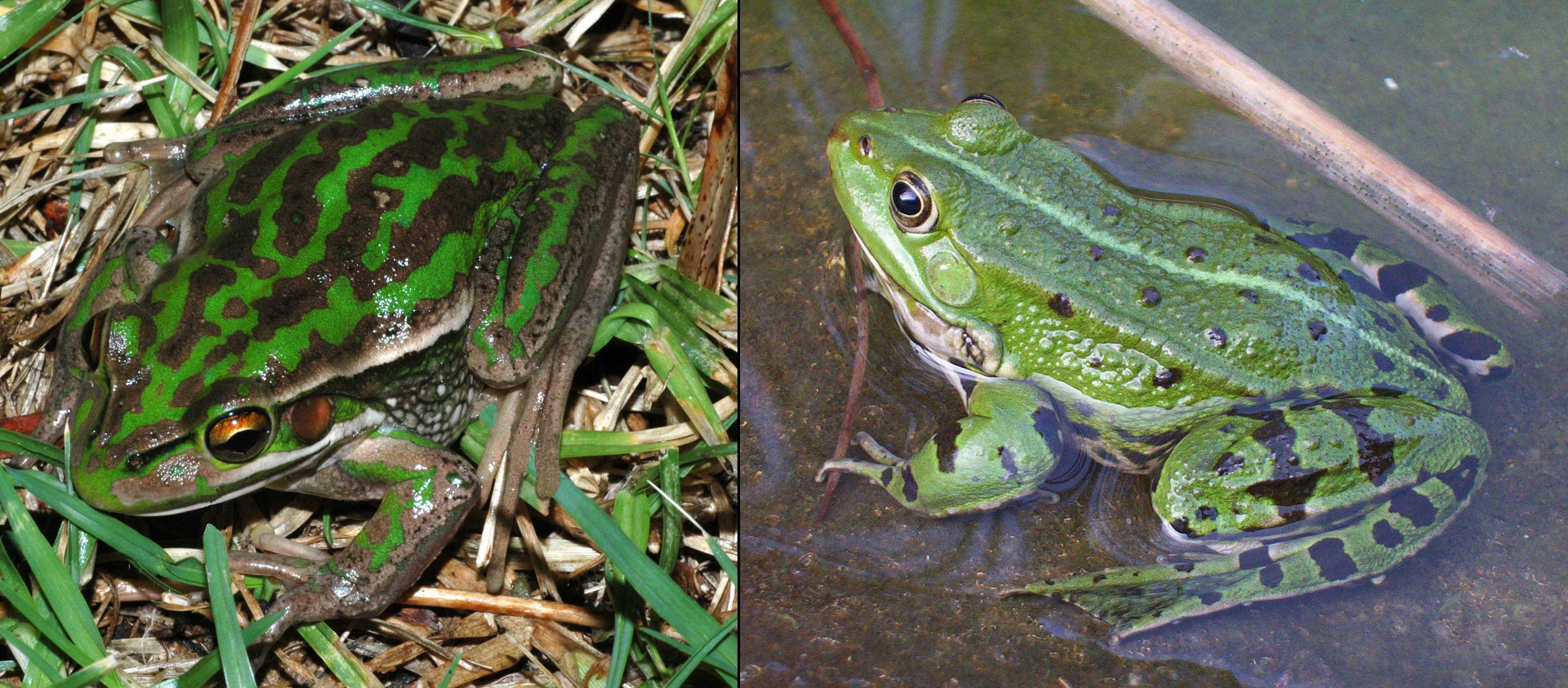
Ranoidea aurea (left) was first classed as a species of the genus Rana (right). There are many physical similarities, including a pointy snout, long legs, and almost complete toe webbing. The overall body shape is similar to many Rana species.

The green and golden bell frog was first described as Rana aurea by René-Primevère Lesson in 1827 and has changed classification many times. The specific epithet aurea derived from the Latin aureus for 'golden'. The species is now classified within the Ranoidea aurea complex, a closely related group of frogs in the genus Ranoidea. This complex is scattered throughout Australia: three species occur in south-east Australia, one in northern Australia, and two in Southwest Australia. The complex consists of the green and golden bell frog (R. aurea), growling grass frog (R. raniformis), yellow-spotted bell frog (R. castanea), Dahl's aquatic frog (R. dahlii), spotted-thighed frog (R. cyclorhyncha) and the motorbike frog (R. moorei). The ranges of R. raniformis and R. castanea overlap with the green and golden bell frog; this, as well as physical similarities, may make it difficult to distinguish between the species, and until 1972, R. raniformis and the green and golden bell frog were regarded as the same, when electrophoretic studies proved them to be distinct. The tablelands bell frog has not been seen since 1980 and may now be extinct, although the large yellow spots present on its thighs help distinguish it from the green and golden bell frog. The growling grass frog, which is very similar to the green and golden bell frog, can only be readily distinguished by raised bumps on the dorsal surface. It has also been proposed that some populations of R. aurea located near Ulong, New South Wales, be a separate subspecies, R. a. ulongae, but this was not accepted.

Ranoidea aurea is equally and most closely related to R. castanea and R. raniformis. A microcomplement fixation technique using serum albumins has indicated the species closest to R. aurea is R. ranifomis. Albumin immunological distance data suggest no differentiation between the two, and the green and golden bell frog evolutionally separated from the other two species about 1.1 million years ago. A 1995 study of protein variations showed four of 19 protein systems had variation and only two had differentiation. Scientists believe the different species can still hybridise, as their distribution areas still overlap, and both R. raniformis and R. aurea have been seen sharing ponds in the Gippsland area of Victoria. However, little evidence of hybridisation actually occurring has been found. Although there have been reports of frogs of mixed appearance in Gippsland, analysis of proteins and sera of the frogs showed two distinct species. Samples in other area of distribution have shown no evidence of hybridisation in spite of cohabitation.

== Distribution ==
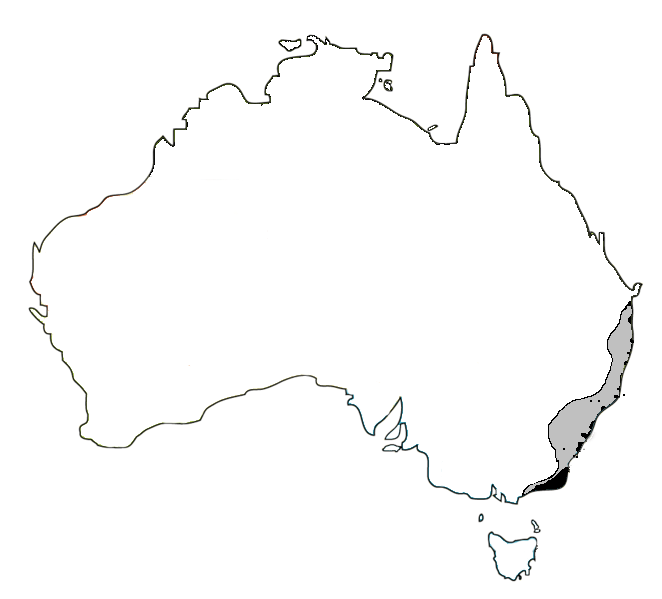
The historic (grey) and the current (black) distribution of the green and golden bell frog

The green and golden bell frog is native to south-eastern Australia. Before its decline in population, its distribution ranged from Brunswick Heads, in northern New South Wales, to East Gippsland, in Victoria, and west to Bathurst, Tumut and the Australian Capital Territory.

The bell frog's current distribution now ranges from Byron Bay, in northern New South Wales, to East Gippsland, in Victoria; populations mostly occur along the coast. In New South Wales, it has declined severely in range and abundance since the 1960s, although no similar declines have been reported in Victoria. In New South Wales, it has disappeared from highland areas above 250 m (820 ft), except for a population in Captains Flat. A study of populations along coastal New South Wales indicated many populations were very small, usually of fewer than 20 adults. According to a 1996 study, six populations of more than 300 frogs are known: two in the Sydney metropolitan area, two in the Shoalhaven, and two in the New South Wales mid-north coast. There are now approximately only 40 sites in total where it is found, most of which are in the Sydney area. The green and golden bell frog has disappeared from an estimated 90% of its former range. Some specimens were apparently found in Armidale, but it turned out to be a misidentification of R. castanea. The declines in Victoria have been more modest and mostly in at inland areas where habitats have disappeared.

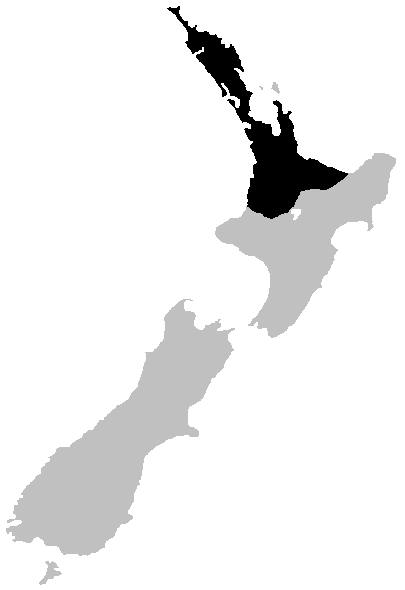
The distribution of R. aurea in New Zealand

The green and golden bell frog survives in some areas of Sydney, such as the Brickpit at Sydney Olympic Park (the proposed site for the tennis courts for the 2000 Sydney Olympics). When the green and golden bell frog was found there, the tennis courts were built elsewhere, and the population has since been monitored. This frog has become an unofficial mascot for the Homebush Bay area. It has also been introduced to places in Sydney in its natural habitat, without much success.

The green and golden bell frog occurs on three islands off the east coast of Australia: Kooragang and Broughton Islands off Port Stephens, and Bowen Island at Jervis Bay. It was introduced to New Zealand in the 1860s by the Auckland Acclimation Society, and it is now common in the part of the North Island north of Rotorua, and can also be found in South Taranaki and some isolated areas of Southland near Te Anau. In most places, it is the only frog species in the vicinity. However, recent declines have been reported, suspected to be due to predatory fish. It was also introduced to the Pacific island countries of New Caledonia and Vanuatu in the 19th century, and has since become common there.

No discernible variation in size or appearance in green and golden bell frogs between different geographic areas is found. Fluctuations in size and appearance between different populations are outweighed by variations within the populations themselves. Females are more likely to be found away from breeding sites, while the opposite applies for males. Metamorphlings are divided in roughly equal numbers between males and females, while juvenile frogs are observed less often than their mature counterparts, although scientists are not sure whether this is due to lower abundance or increased reclusiveness.

== Description ==
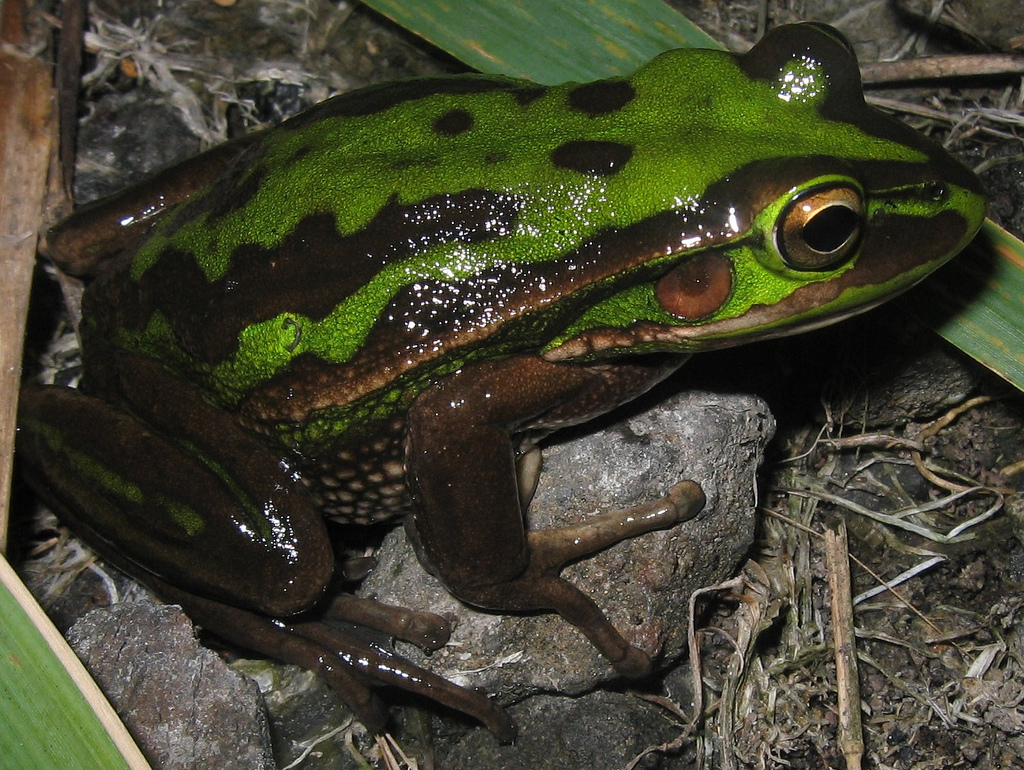
A green and golden bell frog with a dark colouration

The green and golden bell frog is a large, stout frog; adults range from 4.5 to 11 cm (1.8 to 4.3 in) in length; typical specimens measure 6 to 8 cm (2.5 to 3 in). The green and golden bell frog is therefore one of the largest Australian frogs. Mature males are generally smaller than mature females, and the colour on their dorsal surfaces differ greatly from females. It may be almost completely green, of shades from dark pea-green to bright emerald, green with metallic, brassy, dull copper-brown, or gold markings; or almost completely bronzer. Generally, females tend to have more green patches than males. During the cooler months (May–August), when the frogs are inactive, colouration may darken almost to black. They can also darken in this way by simply staying in a dark place for a few minutes, and the colour can also change during the frogs' lifetimes.

A creamy-white or pale yellow stripe, bordered above with gold and below with black, extends from behind the eye, across the typically copper-coloured tympanum to the groin. This stripe rises to form a dorsolateral fold towards the groin. Another stripe of the same colour begins below the eye and continues to the shoulder. The abdomen is cream or white, and has a coarsely granular texture. The legs are green, bronze, or a combination of both, and the inside thigh and groin are blue-green. Mature males develop a yellowish colouration to the vocal sacs on their throats. The tympanum is distinct and ovular in shape, and the species has enlarged toe discs to aid in climbing. As this species is often found in water, the fingers are free from webbing, while the toes are almost completely webbed. When in breeding condition, males develop nuptial pads on their thumbs, which are used to grip females during mating. These are coloured brown during the breeding season, but are inconspicuous and paler during the rest of the year.During the breeding season, females develop a blueish hue on their feet, while males' legs turn rusty orange.

== Ecology and behaviour ==
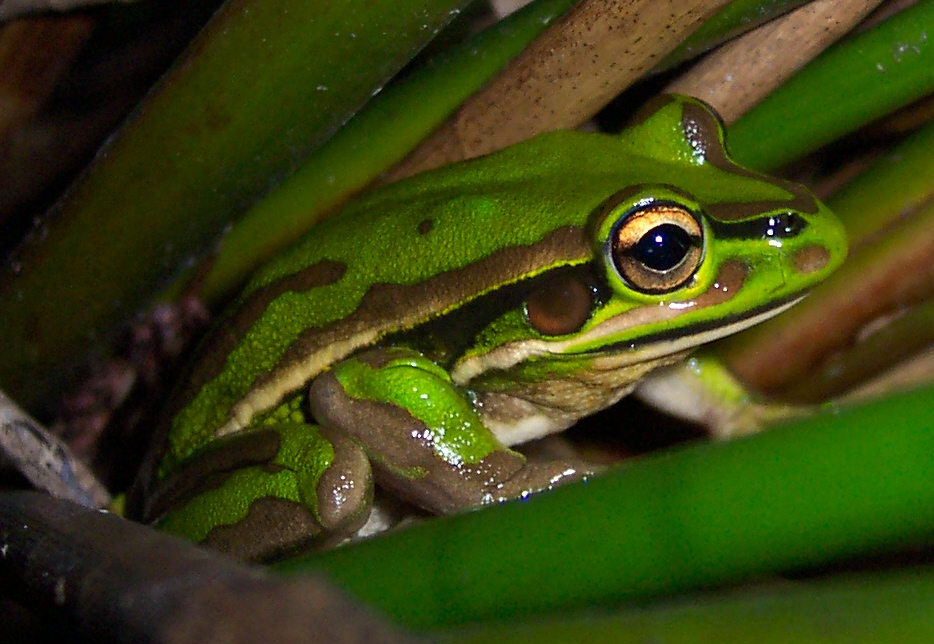
Green and golden bell frog demonstrating camouflage within reedy environments

As a member of the tree frog family, the green and golden bell frog spends much time basking in the sun on vegetation, rocks, and reeds, usually near water, or hopping around between such places. Unlike most frog species, it is often active during the day. When handled, this species secretes a slimy acrid mucus, which consists of 17 aurein peptides. Thirteen of these show broad-spectrum antibiotic and anticancer activity. The secretion makes the frog slippery and hard to grip, and is poisonous to some other species of frogs, so it is a useful defensive tool for green and golden bell frogs. Males often fight one another if they come within 1 m of each other, frequently leading to injuries.

The green and golden bell frog has been detected and prefer a wide range of habitats. It is generally associated with coastal swamps, wetlands, marshes, dams, ditches, small rivers, woodlands, and forests, but populations have also been found at former industrial sites (for instance, the Brickpit). It has even been found in human vessels such as bathtubs. The requirements of its habitat have been difficult to determine, for it has been found in a wide range of water bodies except fast-flowing streams. It is most typically found in short-lived freshwater ponds that are still, shallow, unshaded, and unpolluted, and it tends to avoid waters that contain predatory fish, whether native or introduced. However, it is most often found in areas that have been affected by human habitation. The frog prefers water bodies that support emergent vegetation, such as reeds and bullrushes, for basking, and winter habitats consist of available shelters around the breeding site, which can be vegetation, rocks, rubbish, or human debris and discarded building materials. Medium to highly dense grassy habitats are usually close at hand to provide suitable terrestrial feeding grounds. It prefers waterways with a substrate of sand, rock, or clay, and can tolerate a wide range of water turbidities, pH and oxygen levels, and temperatures, although these can hamper physical growth. Although its legs provide much grip, the frog does not choose to climb trees or live up them to any significant extent. It spends most of its time within 10 cm (3.9 in) of the ground and rarely ventures more than a metre above the ground. The green and golden bell frog also has the ability to sit still for several hours.

The green and golden bell frog can travel far in a single day or night; distances of 1.0 to 1.5 km have been recorded. Tagging experiments have shown that some can move up to 3 km in total, and that some travel several kilometres from the closest breeding habitat. However, the species evidently tends to return to or remain at an identified site, provided the habitat stays appropriate for its needs, or else it will move away. The green and golden bell frog also favours areas with the greatest habitat complexity, and as such, this is a core component of habitat-based strategies to protect the species. In general, the frogs stay within areas of 100–700 m^{2} The frog is well equipped for survival on land. It can rehydrate by absorbing moisture through its ventral skin, and evaporative water loss occurs at a rate, indicative of a watertight skin. very low Some have been observed up to 400 m from the nearest body of water.

During the winter months, the frog tends to be inactive, staying in one place, whereas it moves around during the warmer months to search for food and mating partners. During winter, the frog does become active for brief periods during warm or wet weather. In cold conditions, the frogs are thought to hibernate, based on observations of some being uncovered in a "torpid" state, but this has yet to be proven with rigorous physiological studies. Although the frog is active during the day, this is restricted to leaving its shelter to sunbathe. It tends to not actively feed or forage during the day, hunting insects only if they move into its vicinity.

The green and golden bell frog's reproduction depends on salinity and water temperature. Salinity affects tadpoles' development and metamorphosis, and breeding is significantly slowed for ponds that measure 20 °C (68 °F) or below. The tadpoles can tolerate salinity levels of six parts per thousand (ppt) without any apparent effects, while salinity of 8 ppt or higher decreases growth rates and increases mortality rates. On the other hand, salinity levels of at least 1–2 ppt can be beneficial to the green and golden bell frog because this kills pathogens such as the chytrid fungus. The pH of the pond is not found to affect the likelihood of the eggs to hatch for values between 4 and 10.

=== Diet and predators ===
The voracious adults have very broad diets, including insects such as crickets, larvae, mosquito wrigglers, dragonflies, earthworms, cockroaches, flies, and grasshoppers. They are also known to eat freshwater crayfish and slugs, and other frogs, even of the same species. They have a strong tendency for cannibalism, and frequently these in the same enclosure devour each other. Studies and trials in the wild have shown cannibalism also occurs in the wild.

The tadpoles feed on detritus, algae, and bacteria. Tadpoles in more advanced phases of development may show a preference for vegetable matter, but also scavenge or become carnivorous on aquatic life. Captive tadpoles have eaten boiled lettuce and pet food in pellet form. If population density is high, tadpoles have cannibalised one another.

In captivity the green and golden bell frog is known to feed on crickets, fruit flies, maggots, silkworms, domestic flies, beetles, mealworms, larvae, slaters, cockroaches, molluscs, plague locusts, spiders, water snails, earthworms, and mice. A case of a small tiger snake being eaten has also been reported. Captive frogs have a habit of not responding to stationary food items, which has helped to form the belief that the frog will eat most things that move.

The hunting habits of the frogs change depending on their growth phase and thus physical size. Smaller, still-growing green and golden bell frogs tend to hunt small, especially flying, insects, often jumping to catch their prey. Adult frogs appear to show a distinct preference for larger, land-based insects and frogs, although they also eat aquatic prey, such as tadpoles and other aquatic organisms. Recently metamorphosed individuals have also been seen enter to shallow water to capture mosquito wrigglers. The relative proportion that various prey make up in the frog's diet is not known. In observed studies of captive frogs, they eat less in cooler periods of the year, and frogs in the wild ate less during breeding periods. Younger frogs were also seen to forage longer into the warmer months to build up food stocks than fully matured frogs.

Natural predators include wading birds, such as reef egrets, white-faced herons, white ibises and swamp harriers. Other predators include snakes, skinks, red foxes, tortoises, and eels and other fish, such as redfin perch, plague minnows, empire gudgeons, fire-tailed gudgeons, and a range of invertebrate predators, such as the large brown mantis. Predation on adult frogs has been recorded for the red-bellied black snake, tiger snake, laughing kookaburra, and sacred kingfisher; wading birds and other snakes, such as the green tree snake, are also believed to be predators of the frog. The relative magnitude of the various predatorial threats to the frog and its tadpoles is not known. Before the frog became rare, and when subsistence lifestyles were more common, it was hunted and eaten by Aboriginal Australians. It was also used in dissection demonstrations in biology classes, and caught by humans for feeding pet reptiles.

=== Reproduction ===
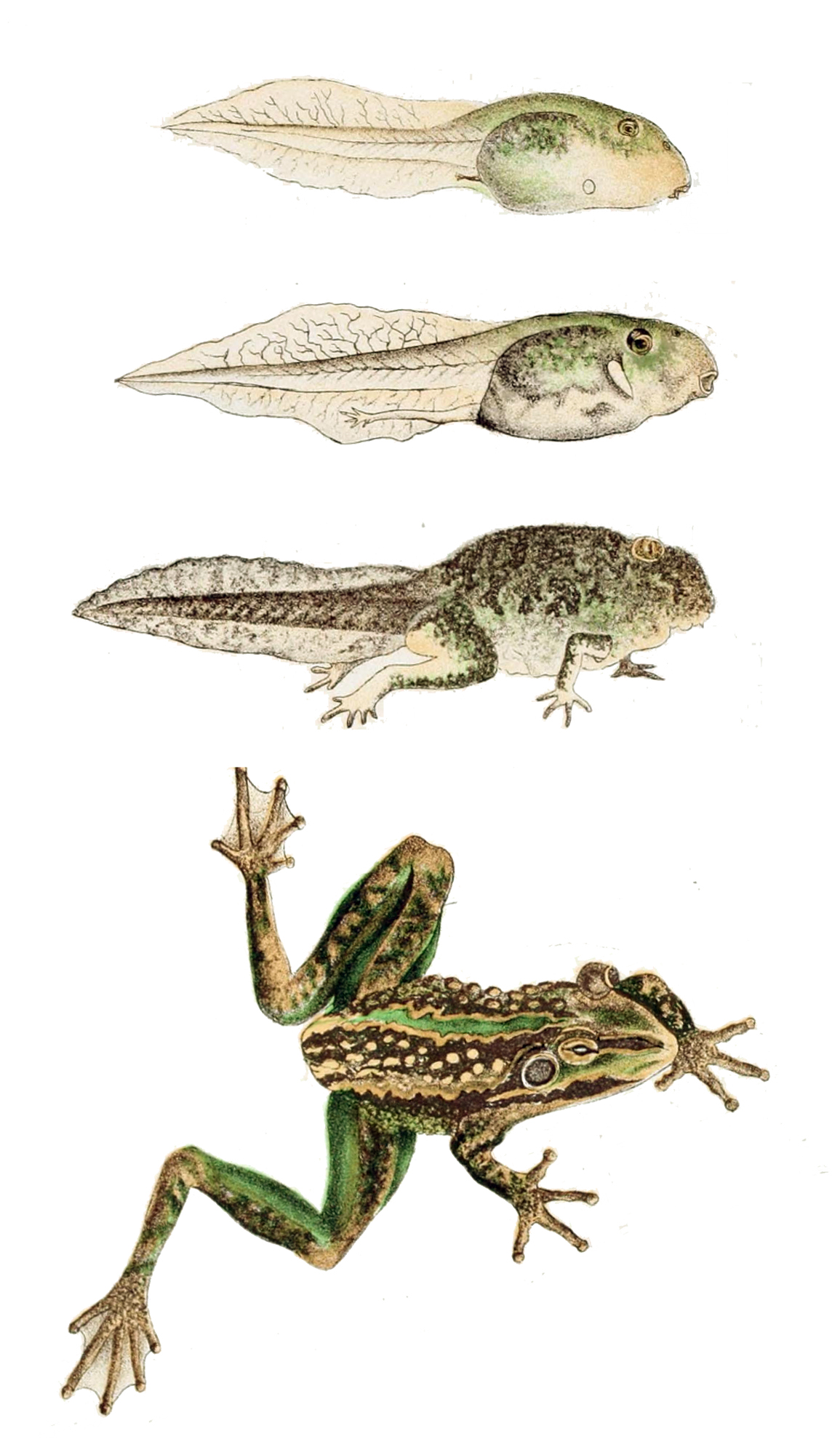
Development of green and golden bell frog

The green and golden bell frog breeds in the warmer months from October to March, although some cases have been recorded earlier at the end of winter. Reproduction appears to be influenced by geography. More southerly and highland populations appear to have a shorter window for breeding than their more northerly and lowland counterparts. The latter appear commence breeding earlier and end later than the former group. During the breeding season, males call, usually while floating in the water, but sometimes on vegetation at the side of a pond, mainly at night. They do so with a deep growl that has been described as a four-part "walk-walk sound"—likened to the sound of a motorbike changing gears. Males have been found to respond to recordings of the call, and this is why entire groups of males will then call in unison. Males are also more likely to call under certain temperature ranges, 16–23 °C (61–73 °F) for water temperature, and 14–25 °C (57–77 °F) in the air. Calling is also more likely immediately after rain has occurred.

Males appear to reach maturity at around 45–50 mm, at between 9 and 12 months, and at this size begin to develop a grey to brownish yellow wash beneath the chin. This indicates the development of a vocal sac and thus an ability to commence calling behaviour. Females reach sexual maturity at two years; those smaller than 65 mm are not seen in amplexus; this length is not reached until the second season after metamorphosis. The frog is not of a type that only breeds once. Females can shed up to 26% of their weight when spawning, while males have also been seen to lose weight during breeding, because they are eating less. The weight lost during the breeding season is typically regained from January to September.

Amplexus between the male and female occurs mainly in water, but sometimes at substantial distances away on dry land. Observations of breeding sites have shown the males linger around the courting area for much longer times, while females mostly stay at other places to find food before meeting the males there. During amplexus, the males grab the females near their armpits after climbing on their backs. In the wild, amplexus usually takes between 10 minutes and five days. Artificially induced amplexus in the laboratory has been observed to last 50 hours, but there have been reports of five days. Sometimes, amplexus will not result in eggs being laid.

The frogs may move up to 100 m (330 ft) during amplexus before the female lays her eggs. During the laying of the eggs, the pair of frogs remain in amplexus and the male is assumed to fertilise the eggs with his sperm. Males are also seen to paddle their rear legs during this time, which is speculated to accelerate fertilisation. The egg-laying and fertilisation process takes around five minutes. An average of 5,000 eggs are deposited amongst aquatic vegetation in a gelatinous mass; however, a clump of 11,682 has been recorded. The female moves around while depositing, leaving a trail of eggs that sometimes entangles upon itself. Initially, the mass floats, but sinks up to 12 hours after laying, or when disturbed. The eggs are distinct from those of other frog species; they are 2–2.5 mm wide upon deposition and are bicoloured, black at one end and white at the other. They immediately begin to expand, quickly reaching around 4 mm across, before sinking. When first laid, they float with the black pointing up, but after sinking, the orientation becomes disordered. Two to five days later, the tadpoles hatch out, but the process can take only a few hours on occasions. The hatching rate varies between 46 and 77%, and peaks at 22 °C (72 °F). Hatching is less likely in acidic waters, although alkaline conditions do not lead to a lower rate compared to neutral conditions. Given the large number of eggs that hatch per female and given the scarcity of mature frogs, tadpole survival rates are believed to be very low.

Upon hatching, the tadpoles are around 2.5–3 mm in snout–vent length (SVL) and about 5–6 mm including the tail. Tadpoles in captivity increase exponentially over time in total length; their SVL increases from about 3 to about 9 mm within five weeks, and it triples again in the next five weeks. In all, the growth rate is 0.2 mm per day in the first five weeks. The tadpoles of the green and golden bell frog are large, reaching 80 mm (3.1 in) in length, but size varies greatly and most are much shorter. The body is usually as wide across as it is deep. The fin has a yellow tinge and is considerably arched. The musculature is moderate and tapers to a fine point, as does the fin. The body wall is translucent yellow with darker areas over the abdomen. Just before its limbs form, the tadpole begins to develop the greenish colouration of the adult. Tadpoles usually swim within 30 cm of the water surface, or remain stationary at the bottom. They often move together in groups akin to schools of fish.

Towards the end of the tadpole phase, hind legs appear, followed by front limbs, and the phase ends when the front limbs are developed. This normally occurs between October and April due to the breeding season, but tadpoles been observed in the wild throughout the year, suggesting some tadpoles overwinter; this has been seen to occur for captive tadpoles. The length of the tadpole stage, in the wild and in captivity, is usually between 10 and 12 weeks, but can range from five weeks to a year. The slower-growing tadpoles usually progress during winter, as there is a positive correlation between growth rates and temperatures. Variation in growth rate across pH values of 4, 7 and 9 was insignificant. In the first four weeks, there was no significant dependence of the growth rate across the 18–26 °C range, but from this point on, growth was significantly hindered at 18 °C. At the beginning of the metamorphing stage, all limbs are present and developed, along with a tail. During this phase, the tail is resorbed, and the only other visible change is the spiracle closing. Metamorphing tadpoles typically have a SVL of 22–28 mm, and will complete metamorphosis between two and 11 months, depending on the temperature of the water and available food. The process is slowed at low temperatures, but generally takes between three and eight days after the tadpole stage is complete. Breeding occurs in a significantly higher proportion of sites where no predatory fish are present, and water bodies are ephemeral rather than permanent. Populations in Victoria, however, have been recorded as breeding in permanent ponds as readily as they do in ephemeral ponds.

Metamorphs resemble the adults and average about 2.6 cm (1.0 in) in length. Recently metamorphosed frogs have been observed to rapidly leave the breeding site, especially when foraging habitat is nearby, and less so if food is not available away from the area. The tendency to migrate is often attributed to cannibalism practised by larger frogs on those that are still developing. After metamorphosis is complete, the frog is around the same length. The juveniles initially grow rapidly, reaching 45 mm within two months, 50–60 mm within half a year, before growth slows. months, and increase in length more slowly after that. Once sexual maturity is reached, the frogs' physical growth is very slow.

Metamorphs weigh about 2 g, while the largest adults can reach 50 g. Individual frogs can vary substantially in body weight due to changes in the amount of stored fat, recent eating, and egg formation. While it is known to live 10–15 years in captivity, the frog's lifespan in the wild is not well understood.

== Conservation status ==
The numbers of green and golden bell frogs are estimated to have declined by more than 30% in the past 10 years. It is listed as globally and nationally vulnerable, and as endangered under the New South Wales Threatened Species Conservation Act, 1995. Although it is only classified as vulnerable at national level, the National Frog Action Plan classifies the green and golden bell frog as endangered. In contrast to Australia, the frogs are abundant in New Zealand and classified as feral and unprotected.

Many factors are thought to be responsible for the dramatic decline of this species in Australia, including habitat fragmentation, erosion and sedimentation of soil, insecticides and fertilisers contaminating water systems, the introduction of predatory fish, and alteration of drainage regimes. Population declines are closely related to the introduction of the eastern mosquitofish (Gambusia holbrooki), a species native to North America that was introduced to control mosquito larvae. Laboratory studies have demonstrated the eggs and tadpoles of the green and golden bell frog are extremely susceptible to predation by this fish, and in 77 of the 93 sites in New South Wales where the green and golden bell frog was known to have disappeared before 1990, eastern mosquitofish were found to be present. The frogs have been known to inhabit waters containing the fish, but breeding is rarely successful there, pointing to the fish's voracious eating of eggs and tadpoles. The fish are not yet present in eastern Victoria, where green and golden bell frog numbers have remained solid, but the fish likely will spread to rivers there, possibly inflicting heavy losses on the frogs.

Other factors thought to affect this species include predation by introduced mammals, such as cats and foxes, changes to water quality at breeding sites, herbicide use, and loss of habitat through the destruction of wetlands. The amphibian chytrid fungus appears to have led to at least some of the decline in numbers, but the relative importance of the various factors is unclear. The frogs may have become more susceptible to chytrid rather than the fungus being more common. The genetic pool of the frogs has been found to be relatively small, attributed to habitat destruction, which has confined the smaller groups of frogs to isolated pockets and increased the incidence of inbreeding. This has led to proposals for frog populations to be mixed by human intervention in an attempt to reduce negative genetic effects and boost survival rates.

The cannibalism of the frog has been speculated to cause its decline in some areas, because the smaller tadpoles can be toxic. Other postulated causes of the decline include increased ultraviolet radiation due to the hole in the ozone layer, global warming, and increased drought. The first theory was tested and the results were inconclusive. Global warming is not thought to be a credible cause, as the extremities of the frog's range have not changed, while declines in population have occurred in both dry and wetter areas.

The green and golden bell frog has been the subject of much research and monitoring, important to improving its conservation. Research focuses on the development of management measures to keep the introduced mosquitofish under control. These include poisoning the fish, but the waterways are large and trials have given mixed results. Predators of the mosquitofish have also been tried. Other strategies may allow for the development and improvement of suitable habitat, such as increasing salinity to protect against chytrid, and to increase the reproductive success of the species. Parallel to these measures, community awareness programmes have also been proposed. One difficulty in protecting the frog is that only 20% of the known populations in New South Wales since 1990 occur in conservation parks. Of the eight populations that occur in conservation parks, only five are wholly located within them and one of these is not breeding. There have been calls for legislation to be introduced to stop habitat degradation on private land to prevent detrimental effects to the frogs. Many proposed developments have been subjected to legal action to protect the habitat, and some communities have started "Friends of the Green and Golden Bell Frog" action groups. As public awareness has increased, documentary and news segments on the deteriorating situation have become more frequent and references to the frog in environmental logos and artworks have increased. The effort to increase public consciousness of the green and golden bell frog has also been aided because its colours are the same as the national colours. Restrictions on logging close to areas inhabited by the frogs have been put in place. As green and golden bell frogs are mostly observed in environments disturbed by humans, targeted environmental interference is seen as a possible means of enhancing habitats.

In 1998, a captive-breeding program was set up by the herpetofauna staff at Taronga Zoo in Sydney, sponsored by the ASX Frog Focus. The purpose of the program was to help preserve declining populations of green and golden bell frogs in the Sydney region. It involved the captive breeding of wild frogs and releasing large numbers of tadpoles back into the wild, habitat restoration, and monitoring after releases. The program was initially titled "Frog Focus Botany", as Botany was the original focus site. Thousands of tadpoles were released into a site in Sir Joseph Banks Reserve and postrelease monitoring was done by the local community. It was also the first time that school students had been involved with endangered species monitoring. The program has since branched off into several other areas. Between 1998 and 2004, tadpoles were released into specially designed ponds and dams on Long Reef Golf Course at Collaroy in northern Sydney, with little success. Although green and golden bell frogs had previously been located in the area, the population had since been lost. Mature male bell frogs are occasionally found there; however, a permanent breeding population has yet to be established. An attempted reintroduction at Marrickville in inner-Sydney has failed due to chytridiomycosis.

Conservation efforts at Homebush Bay include 10 road underpasses for frog movement, more than 90 artificial ponds, and 5 kilometres of frog-proof fencing between their habitats and roads. Additionally, bricks with frog-sized holes have been installed which give the frogs a warm environment in winter, and an antifungal bath is used on frogs which use the bricks.
