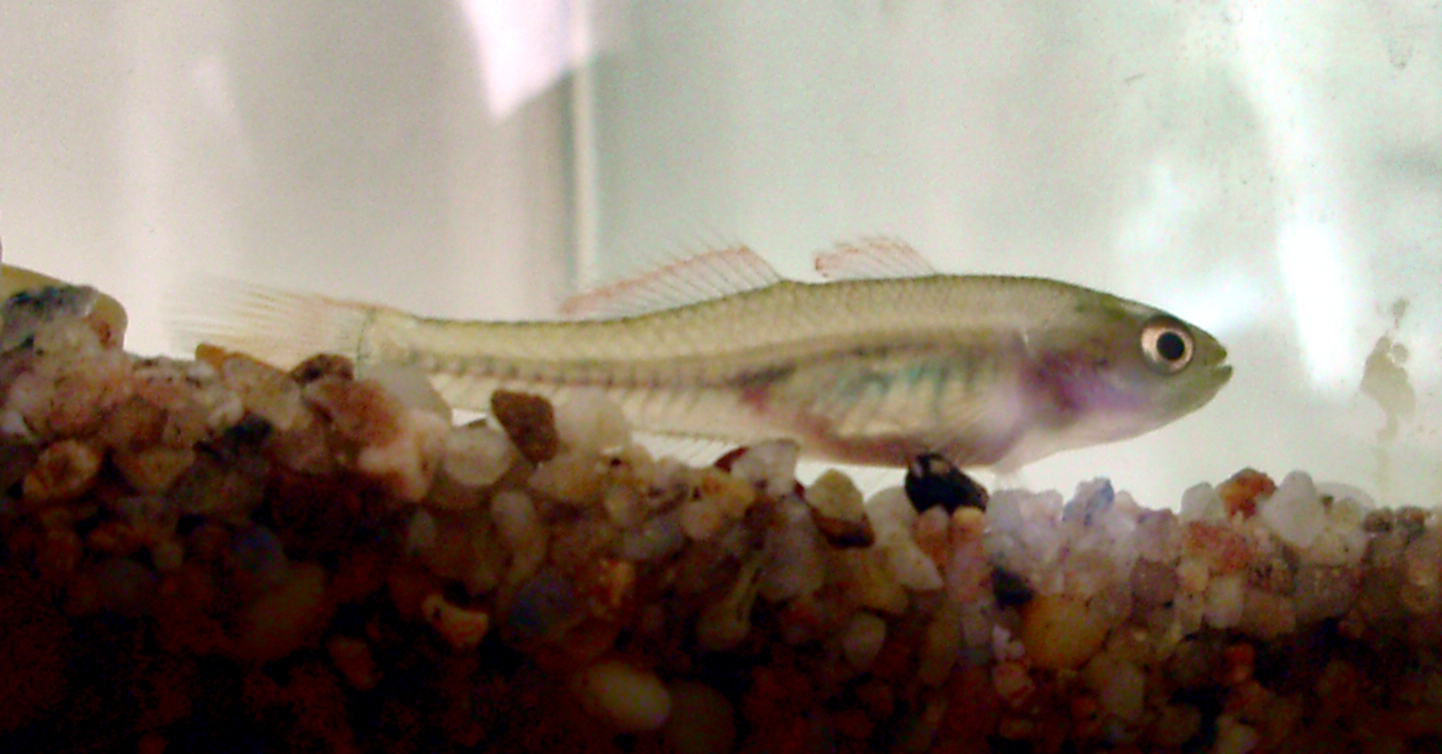
- Male

Conservation status
- Least Concern (IUCN 3.1)

Scientific classification
- Kingdom: Animalia
- Phylum: Chordata
- Class: Actinopterygii
- Division: Teleostei
- Order: Gobiiformes
- Family: Eleotridae
- Genus: Hypseleotris
- Species: H. klunzingeri

Binomial name
- Hypseleotris klunzingeri (J. D. Ogilby, 1898)

Synonyms
- Carassiops klunzingeri J. D. Ogilby, 1898

= Western carp gudgeon =

Species of fish

The Western carp gudgeon (Hypseleotris klunzingeri) is a species of freshwater Gobiiform fish endemic to southeastern Australia. H. klunzingeri is a social species that forms loose shoals within slow moving waters of the Murray–Darling, Lake Eyre & North-East coast drainage basins. All Hypseleotris species are opportunistic predators with a diet primarily made up of aquatic invertebrates such as Insect Larvae, freshwater Plankton and small crustaceans.

Despite their common name, carp gudgeon are in no way related to carp (Cyprinus carpio) or other members of the family Cyprinidae.

== Description ==
Western carp gudgeon are small pelagic fish, averaging 40(±10)mm long, with robust bodies and a Terminal or slightly Superior mouth, males generally possess orange fins with blue-white fin tips. H. klunzingeri is distinguished from similar species by its more acute skull, reduced number of fin rays and lack of genital pigment.

Western carp gudgeons spawn in summer, attaching eggs to aquatic weed in the shallows, males may become territorial during the spawning season; Fry & adults are likely an important forage fish for larger fish species in many waterways.

== Classification ==
The specific name honours the German physician and zoologist Carl Benjamin Klunzinger (1834–1914), who, in 1880, mistook this species for Eleotris cyprinoides.

Previously, H. klunzingeri's relationship with other members of its genus has been unclear, this issue was made more complex thanks to multiple hemiclonal hybrid lineages present throughout Southeastern Australia, recent work has clarified these relationships & revealed multiple novel species such as H. bucephala & H. acropinna. The Western carp gudgeon is currently placed as the most basal member of the Southern Hypseleotris clade, and is believed to be unable to hybridize with any known species.

A study on H. Klunsingeri's genetics in 2023 has revealed 4 distinct genetic populations with their own unique hybrid lineages, which may indicate that klunzingeri itself is another Species complex.

== Interactions with humans ==
Western carp gudgeons are commonly bought as feeder fish Australian aquaria where they're often sold with and confused for the Firetail Gudgeon.

The introduced parasite Asian fish tapeworm Bothriocephalus acheilognathi had caused significant fish kills of the species in Canberra's Lake Burley Griffin and is strongly suspected of affecting other Australian native freshwater fish.

They may have suffered from small variations in river level caused by river regulation, which exposes and destroys eggs laid in shallows. They may be a critical food item for juvenile Murray cod, Western carp gudgeons have taken to lower-altitude, man-made lakes and impoundments in the Murray-Darling system well, and are very common in some.

Hypseleotris preferred prey overlaps with introduced Poeciliid livebearers, placing them in direct competition with Invasive species.

== Uniparental genome elimination ==
Most animals reproduce sexually, that is by a process of fusion of haploid gametes that arise by meiosis in each of two different parents. Meiosis ordinarily involves genetic recombination. However, male and female hybrids of Australian carp gudgeons (Hypseleotris) are fertile, but practice asexual reproduction and display uniparental chromosomal elimination without genetic recombination. This process is termed hybridogenesis. In these fish hybridogenesis occurs through premeiotic genome duplication of the parental genome to be transmitted, while the second parental genome appears to be gradually eliminated during development in juvenile individuals.
