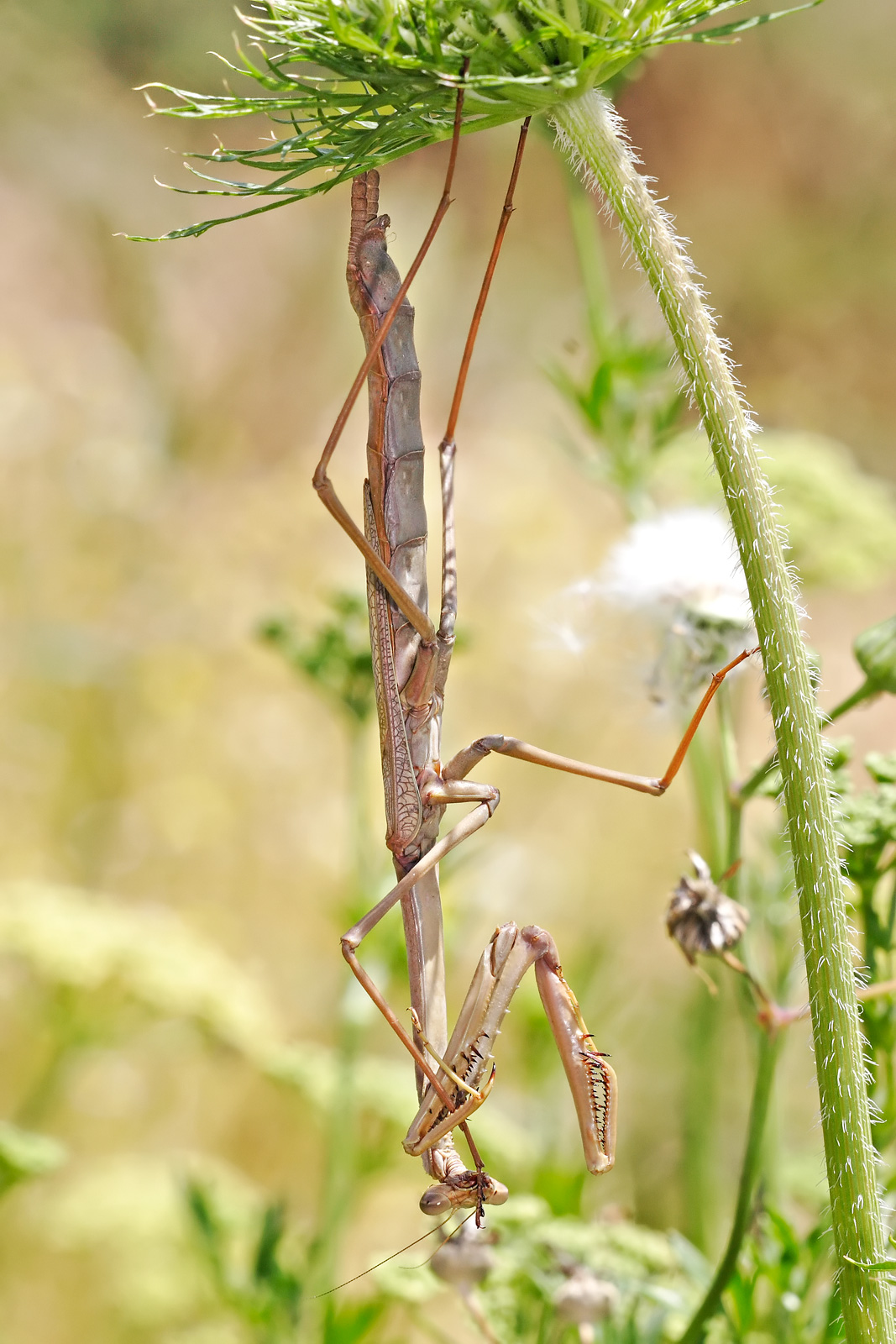
- Archimantis latistyla

Scientific classification
- Kingdom: Animalia
- Phylum: Arthropoda
- Clade: Pancrustacea
- Class: Insecta
- Order: Mantodea
- Family: Mantidae
- Tribe: Archimantini
- Genus: Archimantis; Saussure, 1869

Species
- See text

Synonyms
- Rheomantis Giglio-Tos, 1917

= Archimantis =

Genus of praying mantises

Archimantis is a genus of praying mantis found in Australia. These species are ranging from 150 mm to 180mm, and can be quite aggressive when full adult.

== Species ==
The Mantodea Species File lists:

- Archimantis armata Wood-Mason, 1877
- Archimantis brunneriana Saussure, 1871
- Archimantis gracilis Milledge, 1997
- Archimantis latistyla (Serville, 1839)
- Archimantis monstrosa Wood-Mason, 1878
- Archimantis quinquelobata Tepper, 1905
- Archimantis sobrina Saussure, 1872 - synonym Archimantis minor Giglio-Tos, 1917
- Archimantis straminea Sjostedt, 1918
- Archimantis vittata Milledge, 1997

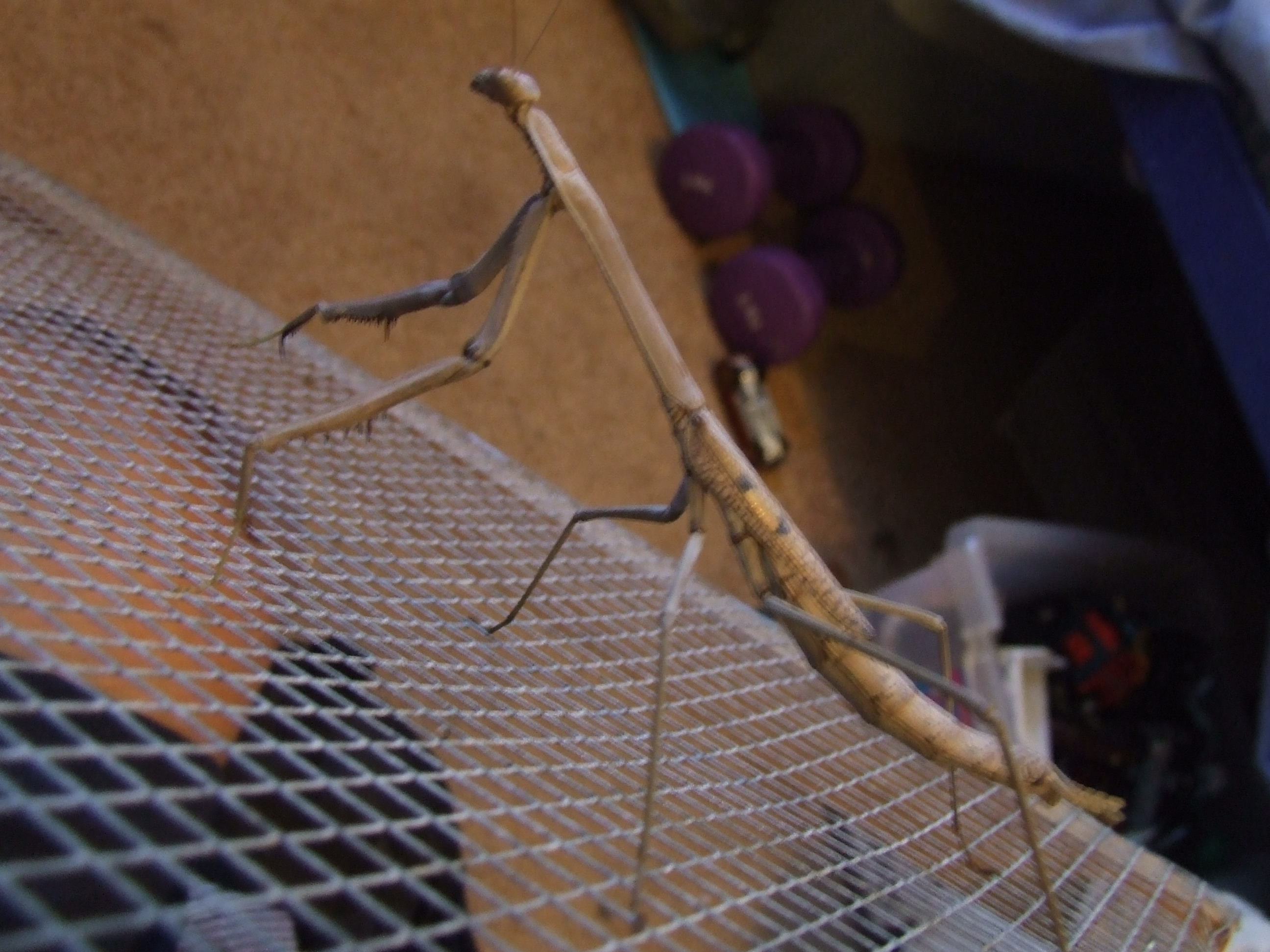
Archimantis monstrosa

== See also ==
- Stick Mantis
- Burying mantis
