= Archimantis vittata =

Scientific classification
- Kingdom: Animalia
- Phylum: Arthropoda
- Clade: Pancrustacea
- Class: Insecta
- Order: Mantodea
- Family: Mantidae
- Genus: Archimantis
- Species: A. vittata

Binomial name
- Archimantis vittata Milledge, 1997

Species of praying mantis

Archimantis vittata is a species of praying mantis in the family Mantidae. It is found in Australia.

== See also ==
- List of mantis genera and species
