= Archimantis armata =

Scientific classification
- Kingdom: Animalia
- Phylum: Arthropoda
- Clade: Pancrustacea
- Class: Insecta
- Order: Mantodea
- Family: Mantidae
- Genus: Archimantis
- Species: A. armata

Binomial name
- Archimantis armata Wood-Mason, 1877

Species of praying mantis

Archimantis armata, the armored archimantis, is a species of mantis in the family Mantidae.

== See also ==
- List of mantis genera and species
