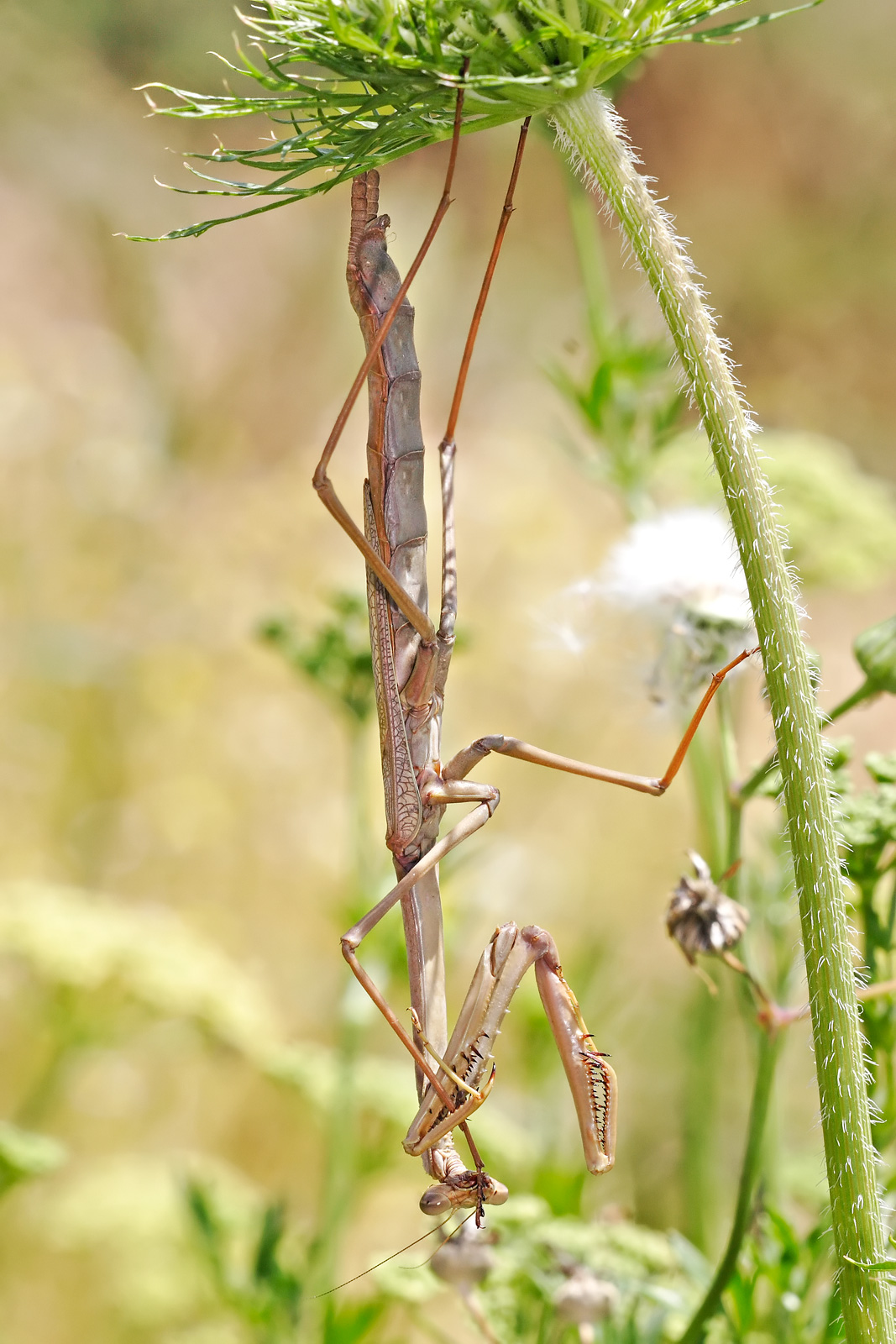
- Archimantis latistyla underneath a carrot flower

Conservation status
- Least Concern (IUCN 3.1)

Scientific classification
- Kingdom: Animalia
- Phylum: Arthropoda
- Clade: Pancrustacea
- Class: Insecta
- Order: Mantodea
- Family: Mantidae
- Genus: Archimantis
- Species: A. latistyla

Binomial name
- Archimantis latistyla (Serville, 1838)

Synonyms
- Archimantis gigantea Beier, 1963

= Archimantis latistyla =

Species of praying mantis

Archimantis latistyla, commonly known as the grass mantis or the stick mantis is a species of mantis native to Australia. Grass mantises are usually light brown with short winged female and a long winged male. The female is not able to fly but the male is. The male grass mantis is smaller than the female and is about 90 mm long and the female is about 110 mm long.

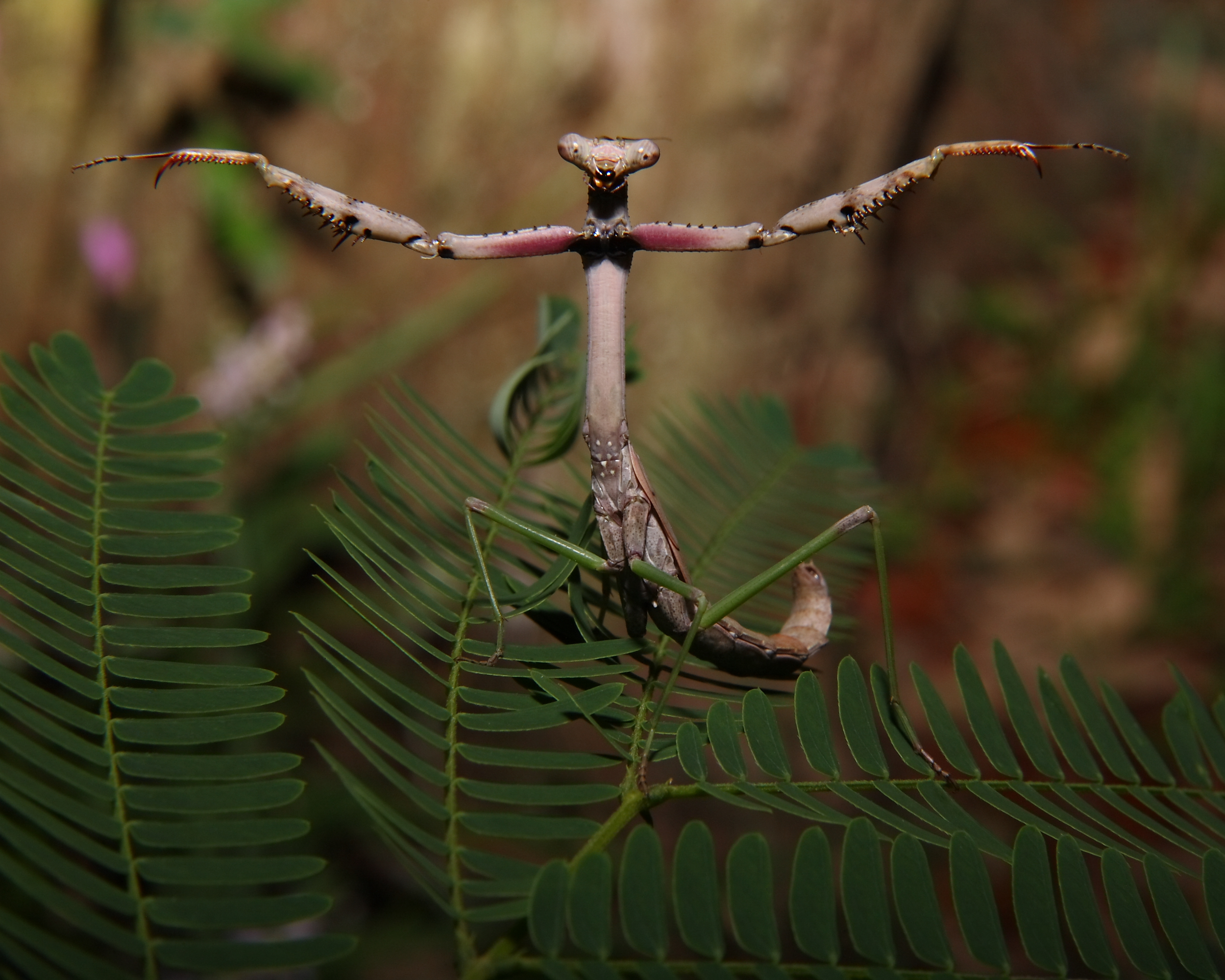
A grass mantis in defense pose

== See also ==
- Mantises of Oceania
- List of mantis genera and species
- Brachyptery — long or short wings evolution.
- Archimantis monstrosa
- Orthodera ministralis
- Sphodropoda tristis
