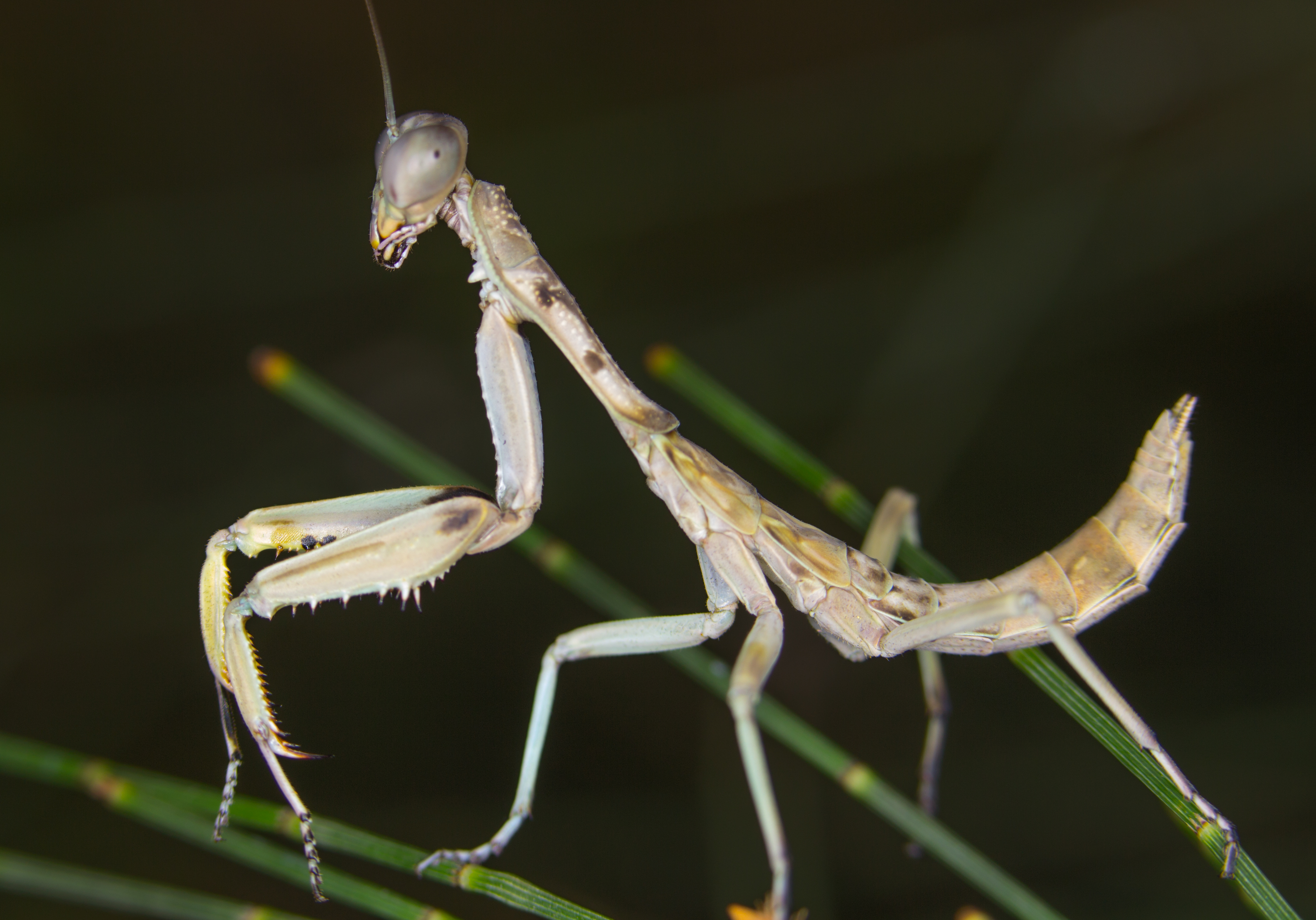
- Sphodropoda tristis

Scientific classification
- Kingdom: Animalia
- Phylum: Arthropoda
- Clade: Pancrustacea
- Class: Insecta
- Order: Mantodea
- Family: Mantidae
- Subfamily: Mantinae
- Tribe: Archimantini
- Subtribe: Trachymantina
- Genus: Sphodropoda; Stal, 1871

= Sphodropoda =

Genus of praying mantises

Sphodropoda is a genus of mantis within the family Mantidae. Members of this genus can be found in Australia.

== Species ==
- Sphodropoda lepida Milledge, 2005
- Sphodropoda quinquedens Mac Leay, 1827
- Sphodropoda tristis Saussure, 1871
- Sphodropoda viridis Tindale, 1923
