= Hypseleotris ejuncida =

Conservation status
- Critically Endangered (IUCN 3.1)

Scientific classification
- Kingdom: Animalia
- Phylum: Chordata
- Class: Actinopterygii
- Division: Teleostei
- Order: Gobiiformes
- Family: Eleotridae
- Genus: Hypseleotris
- Species: H. ejuncida

Binomial name
- Hypseleotris ejuncida Hoese & G. R. Allen, 1982

Species of fish

Hypseleotris ejuncida, the slender gudgeon or slender carp gudgeon, is a species of freshwater ray-finned fish belonging to the family Eleotridae, the spinycheek sleepers or bullies. This fish is endemic to Western Australia.

== Taxonomy ==
Hypseleotris ejuncida was first formally described in 1982 by the ichthyologists Douglass F. Hoese and Gerald R. Allen with its type locality given as Gundarara Creek, about 2 km (1.2 mi) above it junction with Prince Regent River, West Kimberley, Western Australia, about 15°49'S, 125°37'E.. This species is classified in the genus Hypseleotris which was described in 1863 by Theodore Gill with Eleotris cyprinoides designated as its type species, as well as being the type species by monotypy. This genus is classified in the family Eleotridae, which is classified within the suborder Gobioidei, the gobies, of the order Gobiiformes, which also includes the cardinalfishes and sand divers.

== Etymology ==
Hypseleotris enjuncida is classified in the genus Hypseleotris, this name combines hypsēlós, meaning "high" or "tall", an allusion Gill did not explain, it might refer to the rather arched dorsal profile of the type species, combined with Eleotris, the type genus of the family Eleotridae. The specific name, ejuncida, is Latin for "slender" or "slim", an allusion to the slender body shape of this species.

== Description ==
Hypseleotris enjuncida is a small, slender yellowish coloured eleotrid with 3 or 4 dark brown bars between the base of the pectoral fin and the origin of the 2nd dorsal fin. The scales have dark margins which create a rhomboidal pattern, with a wide dark stripe just below the middle of the flank, an obvious dark brown spot at posterior of the caudal peduncle, and a big dark brown bar on the base of the pectoral fin. The first dorsal fin has 6 spines, the second has 1 spine and 9 or 10 fin rays while the anal fin has 1 spine and 9-11 fin rays. This species reaches a maximum standard length of 6 cm (2.4 in).

== Distribution and habitat ==
Hypseleotris enjuncida is endemic to Western Australia where it is known from two tributaries of the Prince Regent River in the West Kimberley region. It is found in freshwater pools in sandtone areas.

== Conservation status ==
Hypseleotris enjuncida has been assessed as Critcally Endangered by the International Union for Conservation of Nature because it has a highly restricted range within one drainage baisn and its population is declining as its habitat is degraded.
