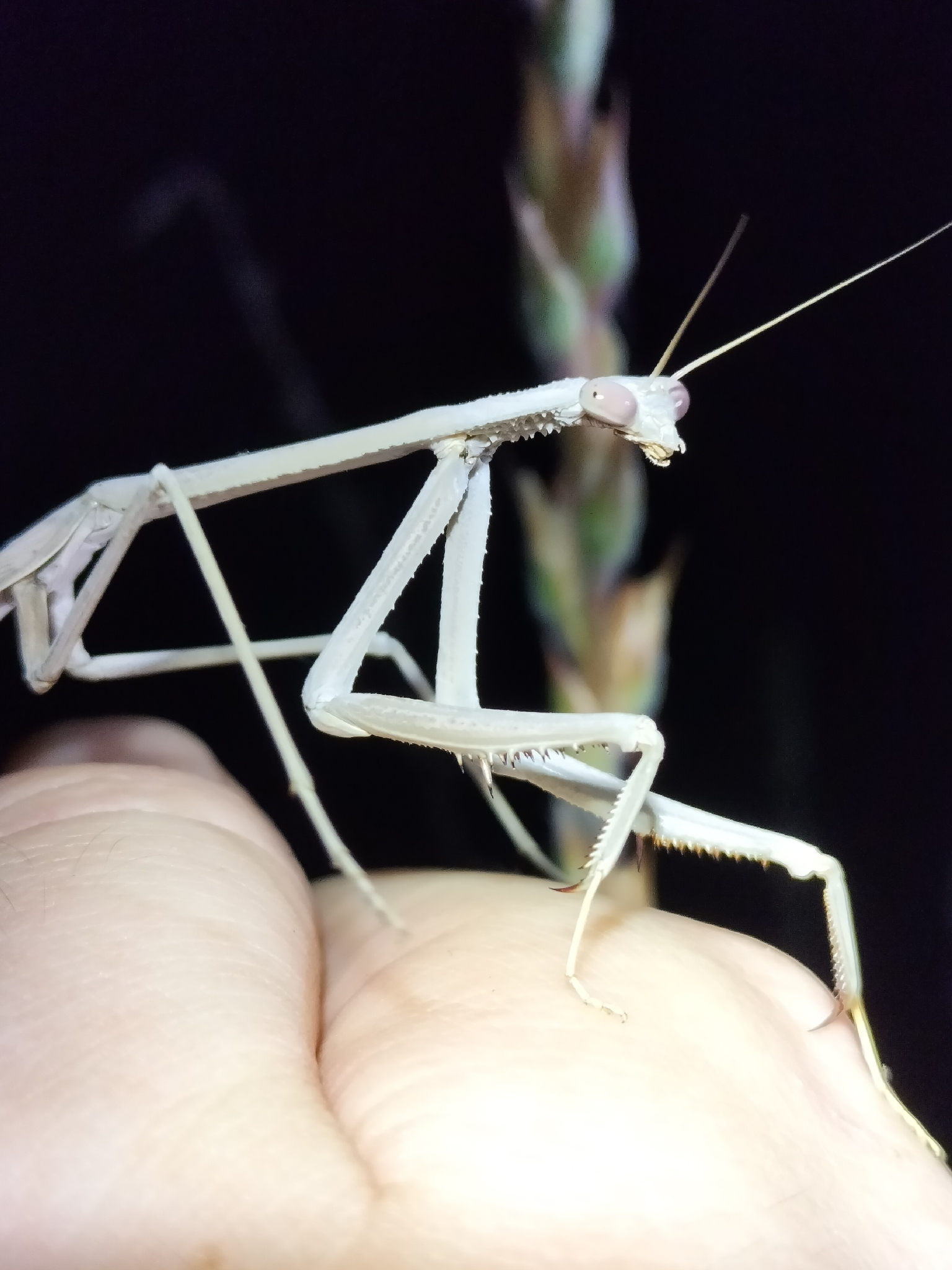

Scientific classification
- Kingdom: Animalia
- Phylum: Arthropoda
- Clade: Pancrustacea
- Class: Insecta
- Order: Mantodea
- Family: Mantidae
- Genus: Archimantis
- Species: A. monstrosa

Binomial name
- Archimantis monstrosa Wood-Mason, 1878

Synonyms
- Archimantis fuscoelytris McCoy, 1886; Archimantis latizonata Sjostedt, 1918

= Archimantis monstrosa =

Species of praying mantis

Archimantis monstrosa is a species of mantid in the family Mantidae. A. monstrosa, or monster mantis, commonly reaches a length of 90mm or more. It is less common than the often-seen large brown mantis. A. monstrosa that live near the coast can get quite large and sometimes will attack much larger prey.

== Identification ==
A. monstrosa can be distinguished from A. latistyla in that it only has three spots on the wing covers where A. latistyla has 4; another feature is the spines on the margin of the thorax.

== See also ==
- List of mantis genera and species
