= Archimantis quinquelobata =

Scientific classification
- Domain: Eukaryota
- Kingdom: Animalia
- Phylum: Arthropoda
- Class: Insecta
- Order: Mantodea
- Family: Mantidae
- Genus: Archimantis
- Species: A. quinquelobata

Binomial name
- Archimantis quinquelobata Tepper, 1905

Species of praying mantis

Archimantis quinquelobata is a species of praying mantis in the family Mantidae.

== See also ==
- List of mantis genera and species
