= Archimantis brunneriana =

Scientific classification
- Domain: Eukaryota
- Kingdom: Animalia
- Phylum: Arthropoda
- Class: Insecta
- Order: Mantodea
- Family: Mantidae
- Genus: Archimantis
- Species: A. brunneriana

Binomial name
- Archimantis brunneriana Saussure, 1871

Species of praying mantis

Archimantis brunneriana is a species of praying mantis in the family Mantidae.

== See also ==
- List of mantis genera and species
