= Hypseleotris aurea =

Conservation status
- Endangered (IUCN 3.1)

Scientific classification
- Kingdom: Animalia
- Phylum: Chordata
- Class: Actinopterygii
- Division: Teleostei
- Order: Gobiiformes
- Family: Eleotridae
- Genus: Hypseleotris
- Species: H. aurea

Binomial name
- Hypseleotris aurea (Shipway, 1950)

Synonyms
- Eleotris aurea Shipway, 1950

Species of fish

Hypseleotris aurea, the golden gudgeon or golden carp gudgeon, is a species of freshwater ray-finned fish belonging to the family Eleotridae, the spinycheek sleepers or bullies. This fish is endmeic to Western Australia.

== Taxonomy ==
Hypseleotris aurea was first formally described as Eleotris aurea in 1950 by the Australian ichthyologist Bruce Shipway with its type locality given as Wilgia Mia Pool, 48 km (30 mi) upstream from the mouth of Murchison River, Western Australia. This species is classified in the genus Hypseleotris which was described in 1863 by Theodore Gill with Eleotris cyprinoides designated as its type species, as well as being the type species by monotypy. This genus is classified in the family Eleotridae, which is classified within the suborder Gobioidei, the gobies, of the order Gobiiformes, which also includes the cardinalfishes and sand divers.

== Etymology ==
Hypseleotris aurea is classified in the genus Hypseleotris, this name combines hypsēlós, meaning "high" or "tall", an allusion Gill did not explain, it might refer to the rather arched dorsal profile of the type species, combined with Eleotris, the type genus of the family Eleotridae. The specific name, aurea, the Latin for "golden" , an allusion to the colour of this fish.

== Description ==
Hypseleotris aurea has a fusiform body and it reaches a total length of 8 cm (3.1 in). This species has 6 spines in its first dorsal fin, 1 spine and 10 fin rays while the anal fin has 1 spine and 11 fin rays. This species is a small brownish to golden-brown fish with a lighter coloured underside. There is a reticulated pattern created by the dusky scale margins and there are sometimes 6-9 ill-defined bars along the flanks. The dorsal and anal fins have blue margins and there is a black spot over the base of the pectoral fin.

== Distribution and habitat ==
Hypseleotris aurea is endemic to Western Australia where it is found in the Murchison River and the Gascoyne River. This species occurs in small permanent and intermittent freshwater pools with moderately turbid water and sandy or boulder beds, with a littering of dead tree branches.

== Conservation status ==
Hypseleotris aurea has been assessed as Endangered by the International Union for Conservation of Nature because it has such a small scale, is threatened by invasive species such as Oreochromis mossambicus, salinisation of its habitat and silting caused by grazing livestock.
