= Bothriocephalus acheilognathi =

Asian tapeworm

Scientific classification
- Kingdom: Animalia
- Phylum: Platyhelminthes
- Class: Cestoda
- Order: Bothriocephalidea
- Family: Bothriocephalidae
- Genus: Bothriocephalus
- Species: B. acheilognathi

Binomial name
- Bothriocephalus acheilognathi Yamaguti, 1934

Synonyms
- Bothriocephalus opsariichthydis Yamaguti, 1934; Bothriocephalus gowkongensis Yeh, 1955; Bothriocephalus fluviatilis Yamaguti, 1952; Schyzocotyle fluviatilis Akhmerov, 1960; Bothriocephalus phoxini Molnar, 1966; Bothriocephalus aegyptiacus Rysavy & Moravec, 1975; Bothriocephalus kivuensis Baer & Fain, 1958

Species of flatworm

Bothriocephalus acheilognathi, also known as the Asian tapeworm, is a freshwater fish parasite that originated from China and Eastern Russia. It is a generalized parasite that affects a wide variety of fish hosts, particularly cyprinids, contributing to its overall success.

== Description ==
B. acheilognathi has a fleshy scolex (head region) with an undeveloped terminal disc and two long attachment grooves called bothria positioned dorsoventrally. The scolex is distinctively shaped like an inverted heart or an arrowhead. Its ribbon-like body consists of flattened segments called proglottids. It typically grows to a length of 3.5 to 8 cm (1.4 to 3.1 in) with widths of up to 4 mm (0.16 in), but exceedingly large specimens reaching 60 to 100 cm (2.0 to 3.3 ft) have been recorded. They are remarkable in their ability to adapt their sizes depending on the size of their hosts.

== Taxonomy ==
Bothriocephalus acheilognathi has more than twenty known synonyms. It was originally described as three species, all of them from non-native populations. In 1934, the Japanese helminthologist Satyu Yamaguti first described specimens from wild fish recovered from Ogura Lake, Japan. He named them as two different species – Bothriocephalus acheilognathi and Bothriocephalus opsariichthydis. In 1955, the Chinese helminthologist Liang-Sheng Yeh described more specimens recovered from grass carp (Ctenopharyngodon idella) in South China as Bothriocephalus gowkongensis. These species were later recognized as synonyms by later authors, and Yamaguti's original name for the species was retained by the rules of precedence.

== Distribution and habitat ==
The natural host of Bothriocephalus acheilognathi is the grass carp which is native to the Amur River in China and eastern Russia. But it has become widespread throughout the world by means of introductions of the grass carp. Even the type specimens were not native. It is now known to exist in Europe, Australia, Mexico, Panama, Honduras, the United States, Canada, and Puerto Rico. It can infect species of fish that belong to the families Cyprinidae, Poecilidae, Cichlidae and Centrarchidae. In Australia, it infects fish in the Family Eleotridae, and likely others.

== Pathology ==
The parasite attaches near the anterior portion of the intestine, just posterior to the bile duct. An accumulation of tapeworms in this area leads to digestive tract blockage that distends the intestinal wall leading to perforation. When attached, B. acheilognathi envelopes parts of the intestines and induces an inflammatory response. The inflammation can lead to hemorrhage and necrosis. Clinical signs also include, weight loss, anemia, and mortality (especially in young fishes). Infections can be detected by the presence of eggs or body parts in feces, and by the presence of the tapeworm in the gut of the fish.

== Life cycle ==
The life cycle of B. acheilognathi involves a definitive host, a fish, and an intermediate host, a copepod. The adult tapeworm is hermaphroditic; each proglottid has a complete set of both male and female reproductive organs and produces eggs via self-fertilization. The tapeworm is sensitive to temperature, in addition the species is thermophilic; lower temperatures interfere and delay development and completion of the life cycle. The eggs are released into the water through the fish fecal material, where they hatch into free-swimming hexacanth (six-hooked) larvae. Between 1 and 28 days, the eggs will hatch according to the water temperature range it is in. Eggs that hatch within 1–5 days occur at temperatures between 28 and 30 °C and eggs that hatch within 10–28 days occur at temperatures between 14 and 15 °C.

When the free-swimming larvae, called coracidia, are eaten by copepods (intermediate host), it penetrates into the gut wall, travels to the coelom, and develops into a second larval stage called a procercoid (infective form) all within 6–10 days. Once the infected copepods are eaten by the fish hosts, the procercoid rapidly transform into the plerocercoid stage and attaches to the intestinal gut wall, where it develops into the adult parasite over the course of 21–23 days.

== Ecological impact ==
Studies have shown that B. acheilognathi decreases the size of fish worldwide causing great economic loss in hatcheries and fish farms. The Asian tapeworm was introduced globally via grass carp. Infestation is intermittent and follows a clear seasonal pattern with peak incidence in the summer. There are multiple chemotherapeutic solutions to fight infection. Tinostat, Yomesan, Droncit are examples of drugs (when mixed in fish food with oil) that are effective in relieving infection. Eliminating an infestation can be amplified by control of copepods in water.

In North America, introduced B. acheilognathi are also known to infect threatened native species like humpback chub (Gila cypha), Mojave tui chub (Siphateles bicolor mohavensis), Virgin roundtail chub (Gila robusta seminuda), woundfin minnow (Plagopterus argentissimus), Profundulus portillorum and the crucian carp (Carassius carassius). The discovery of the tapeworm's substantial infections within the crucian carp population in the UK is of particular concern because there have not been any known natural tapeworm parasites of these crucian carp. A plausible cause may be that the crucian carp have limited immunological defenses against this parasite. In Australia, introduced B. acheilognathi has caused fish kills of Western Carp Gudgeon and is strongly suspected of affecting other Australian freshwater fish species.
