= Archimantis straminea =

Scientific classification
- Domain: Eukaryota
- Kingdom: Animalia
- Phylum: Arthropoda
- Class: Insecta
- Order: Mantodea
- Family: Mantidae
- Genus: Archimantis
- Species: A. straminea

Binomial name
- Archimantis straminea Stöstedt, 1918

Species of praying mantis

Archimantis straminea is a species of praying mantis in the family Mantidae.

== See also ==
- List of mantis genera and species
