= Prince Regent gudgeon =

Conservation status
- Near Threatened (IUCN 3.1)

Scientific classification
- Kingdom: Animalia
- Phylum: Chordata
- Class: Actinopterygii
- Order: Gobiiformes
- Family: Eleotridae
- Genus: Hypseleotris
- Species: H. regalis

Binomial name
- Hypseleotris regalis Hoese & G. R. Allen, 1982

Species of fish

The Prince Regent gudgeon (Hypseleotris regalis) is a species of fish in the family Eleotridae endemic to Australia, where it is only known to occur in clear, rocky pools in the Prince Regent Reserve in Western Australia. This species can reach a length of 5 cm (2.0 in).

== Biology ==
The Prince Regent gudgeon is a freshwater fish. It is known to inhabit clear, rocky pools with slow to moderate flow. Their males and females differ as the female fish are lighter colored, with their truncate fin and dorsal fin well separated. The males are larger, with a rounded caudal fin, prolonged dorsal and anal rays and the first dorsal membrane almost touching the second dorsal.
