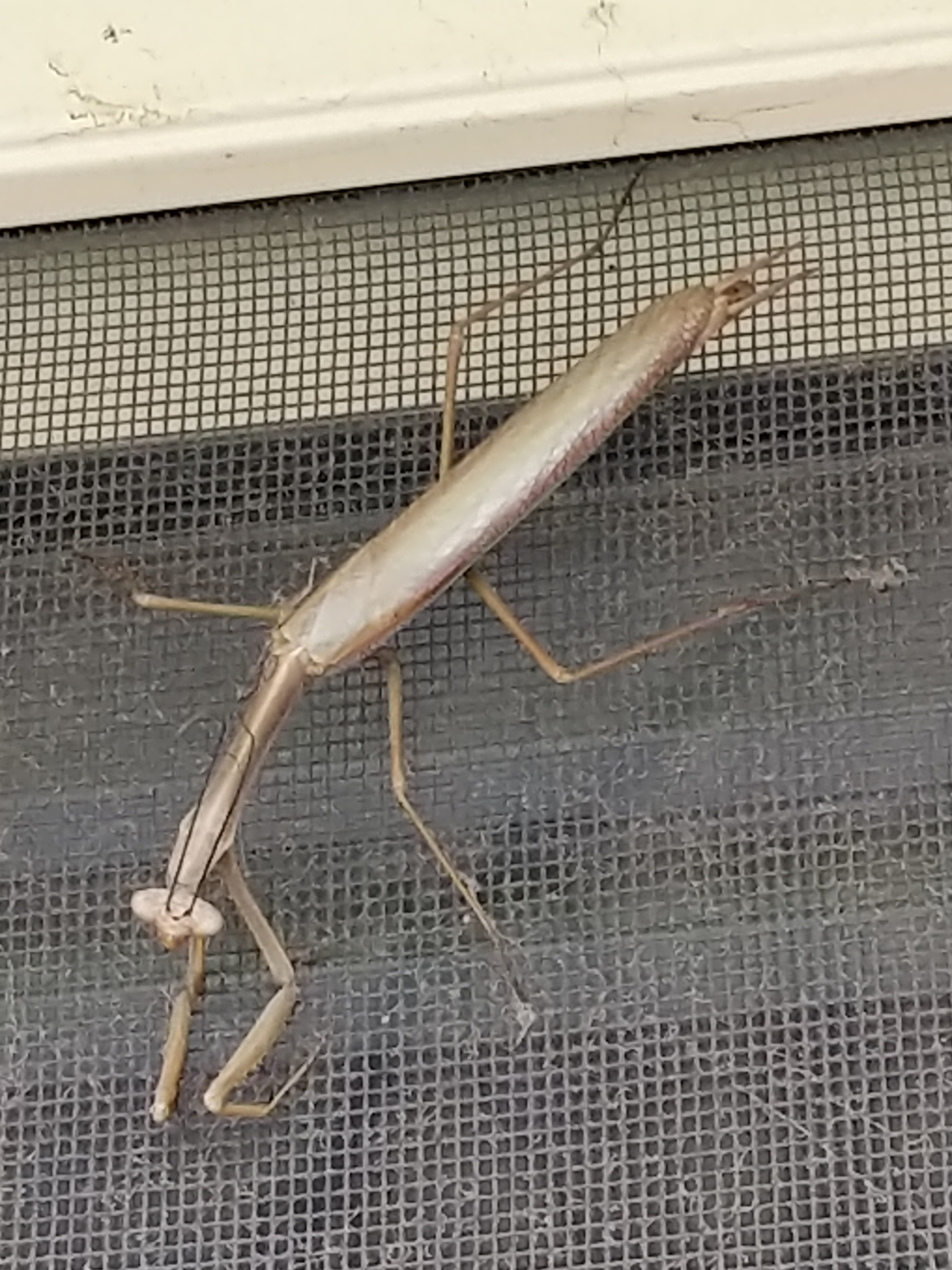

Scientific classification
- Kingdom: Animalia
- Phylum: Arthropoda
- Clade: Pancrustacea
- Class: Insecta
- Order: Mantodea
- Family: Mantidae
- Genus: Archimantis
- Species: A. sobrina

Binomial name
- Archimantis sobrina Saussure, 1872

Synonyms
- Archimantis minor Giglio Tos, 1917

= Archimantis sobrina =

Species of praying mantis

Archimantis sobrina or Mallee Grass Mantis is a species of praying mantis in the family Mantidae.

== See also ==
- List of mantis genera and species
