= Hypseleotris kimberleyensis =

Conservation status
- Endangered (IUCN 3.1)

Scientific classification
- Kingdom: Animalia
- Phylum: Chordata
- Class: Actinopterygii
- Order: Gobiiformes
- Family: Eleotridae
- Genus: Hypseleotris
- Species: H. kimberleyensis

Binomial name
- Hypseleotris kimberleyensis Hoese & G. R. Allen, 1982

Species of fish

Hypseleotris kimberleyensis, the Barnett River gudgeon, is a species of fish in the family Eleotridae endemic to Australia, where it is only known from the Barnett River system of Kimberley, Western Australia. Its preferred habitat is rocky pools and streams. This species can reach a length of 6 cm (2.4 in).
