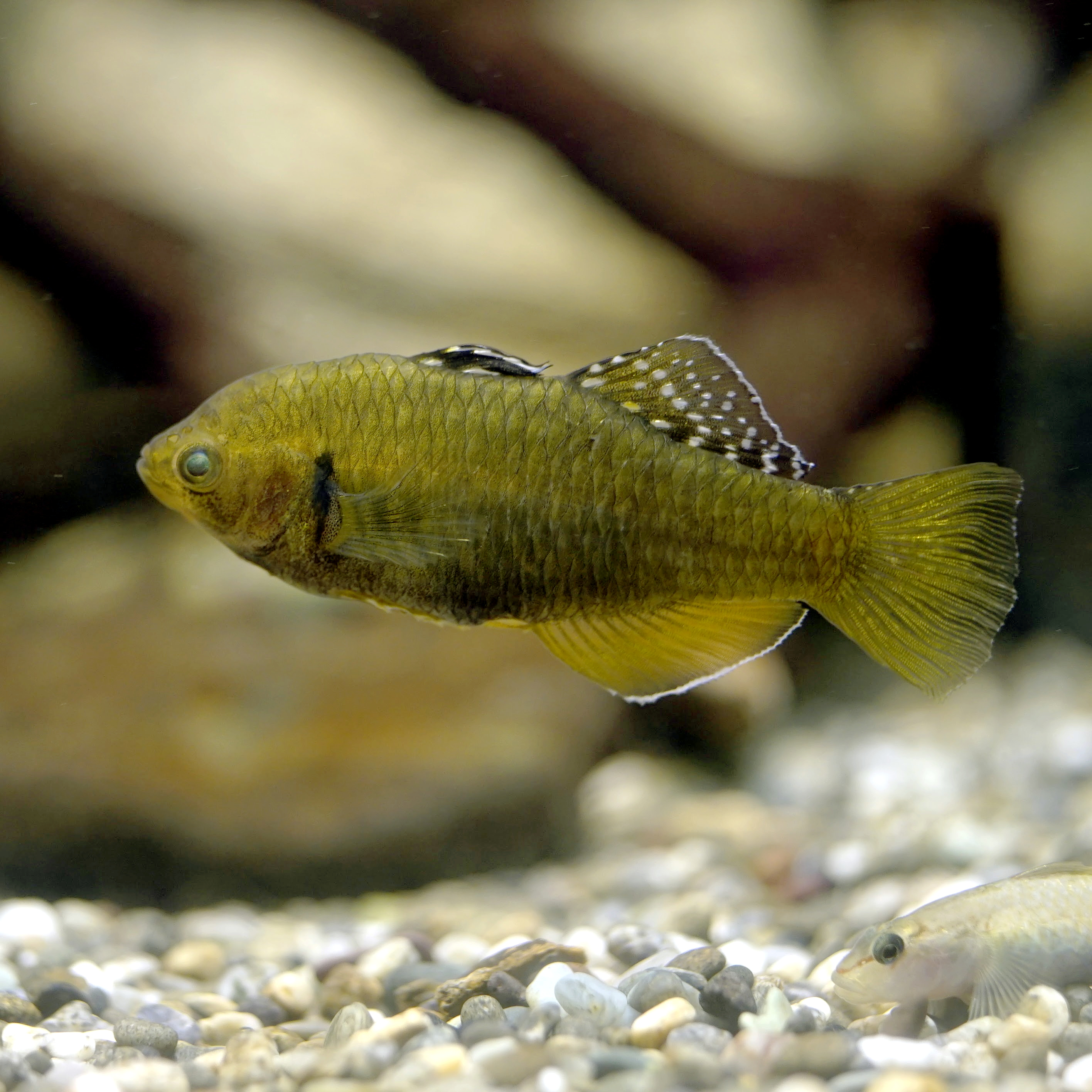
- Hypseleotris cyprinoides male in breeding colours

Scientific classification
- Kingdom: Animalia
- Phylum: Chordata
- Class: Actinopterygii
- Order: Gobiiformes
- Family: Eleotridae
- Genus: Hypseleotris; T. N. Gill, 1863

Type species
- Eleotris cyprinoides Valenciennes, 1837

= Hypseleotris =

Genus of fishes

Hypseleotris, or carp gudgeons, are a genus of small fresh and brackish water fishes in the family Eleotridae. Fish of this genus are found in rivers and estuaries connected to the tropical Indo-Pacific region. They are sometimes seen in the aquarium trade; especially H. compressa.

Hypseleotris species are opportunistic predators, feeding on zooplankton, small crustaceans and other benthic invertebrates. Mostly pelagic, Hypseleotris often aggregate in small schools but become territorial during breeding, which typically occurs in spring.

== Species ==
Hypseleotris is made up of 23 species divided into 3 major clades. The most basal clade contains 6 isolated species of euryhaline gudgeons closely related to H. cyprinoides, with a distribution range extending from South Africa to eastern Melanesia and as far north as mainland China.

The remaining species originated in Australia and would've diverged from other Hypseleotris sometime between 5 and 11 million years ago, these species are organized based on their origins in Northwest and Southeast Australia respectively. The Northwestern group is made up of 12 species which are endemic to the Northern Territory and Western Australia with the exemption of H. compressa, which can be found across most of Australia and New Guinea. The Southeastern clade is found across South Australia, Queensland and New South Wales, featuring 6 species and several hybrid/hemiclonal lineages which consist of a single sex, a process known as hybridogenesis. The single sex species require gametes from the sexual species to reproduce and could be regarded as sexual parasites and in "closed populations" this sexual parasitism can cause the extinction of such populations. It is likely that this reproduction involves androgenesis.

- Hypseleotris cyprinoides complex
  - Hypseleotris alexis
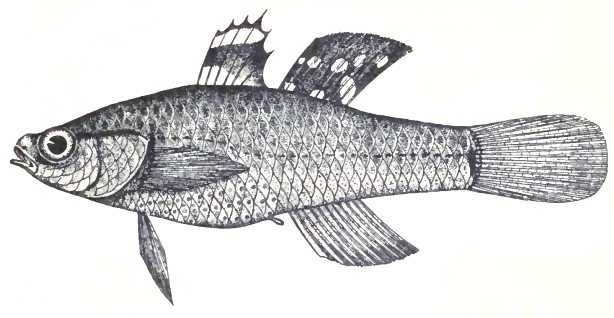
  - Hypseleotris cyprinoides (Valenciennes, 1837) (tropical carp-gudgeon)
  - Hypseleotris ebneri (Keith & Mennesson, 2023 )
  - Hypseleotris everetti (Boulenger, 1895)
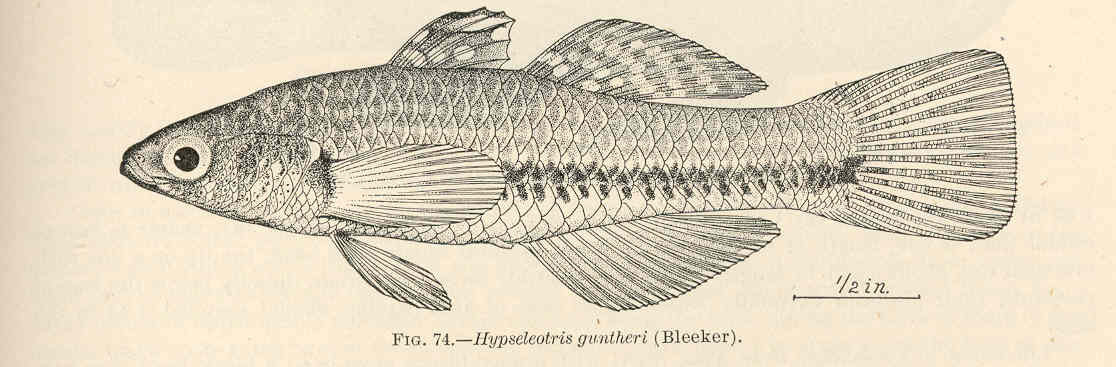
  - Hypseleotris guentheri (Bleeker, 1875)
  - Hypseleotris moncktoni

Australian clades

- Northwestern complex
  - Hypseleotris aurea (Shipway, 1950) (golden gudgeon)
  - Hypseleotris barrawayi Larson, 2007
  - Hypseleotris compressa (J. L. G. Krefft, 1864) (empire gudgeon)
  - Hypseleotris ejuncida Hoese & G. R. Allen, 1982 (Slender gudgeon)
  - Hypseleotris garawudjirri (Shelly, Delaval & Le Fuevre 2023)
  - Hypseleotris hutchinsi Hoese & G. R. Allen, 1987 (Mitchell gudgeon)
  - Hypseleotris kimberleyensis Hoese & G. R. Allen, 1982 (Barnett River gudgeon)
  - Hypseleotris maranda (Shelly, Delaval & Le Fuevre 2023)
  - Hypseleotris notata Hoese & G. R. Allen, 1987 (Drysdale gudgeon)
  - Hypseleotris regalis Hoese & G. R. Allen, 1982 (Prince Regent gudgeon)
  - Hypseleotris wunduwala (Shelly, Delaval & Le Fuevre 2023)
- Southeastern Complex
  - Hypseleotris acropinna Thacker, Geiger & Unmack, 2022 (cryptic gudgeon)
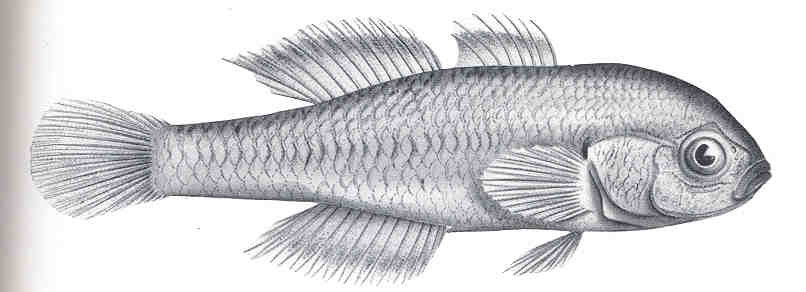
  - Hypseleotris bucephala Thacker, Geiger & Unmack, 2022 (boofhead carp gudgeon)
  - Hypseleotris galii (J. D. Ogilby, 1898) (firetail gudgeon)
  - Hypseleotris gymnocephala Thacker, Geiger & Unmack, 2022 (bald carp gudgeon)
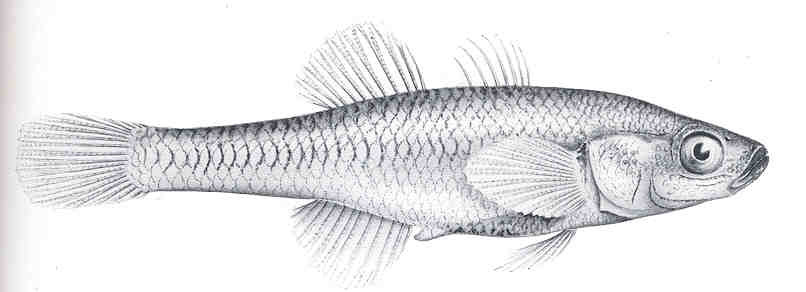
  - Hypseleotris klunzingeri (J. D. Ogilby, 1898) (western carp gudgeon)
  - Hypseleotris moolooboolaensis Thacker, Geiger & Unmack, 2022 (Mary carp gudgeon)

The following cladogram represents the interspecies relationships of the genus but does not include the Australian hybrid populations.

- Eleotridae
  - - Philypnodon
    - Hypseleotris
      - African/Asian branch
        - Hypseleotris moncktoni
        - - Hypseleotris cyprinoides
          - Hypseleotris everetti
        - - Hypseleotris ebneri
          - - Hypseleotris alexis
            - Hypseleotris guentheri
      - Australian branch
        - - Northwest clade
            - Hypseleotris compressa
            - - - Hypseleotris aurea
                - Karijini Population
              - - Hypseleotris barrawayi
                - - Kimberleyeleotris notata
                  - Kimberleyeleotris hutchinsi
                - - Hypseleotris wunduwala
                  - Hypseleotris kimberleyensis
                - Hypseleotris garawudjirri
                - Hypseleotris maranda
                - - Hypseleotris ejuncida
                  - Hypseleotris regalis
          - Southeast clade
            - Hypseleotris klunzingeri
            - - - Hypseleotris acropinna
                - Hypseleotris galii
                - Hypseleotris moolooboolaensis
              - - Hypseleotris bucephala
                - Hypseleotris gymnocephala
