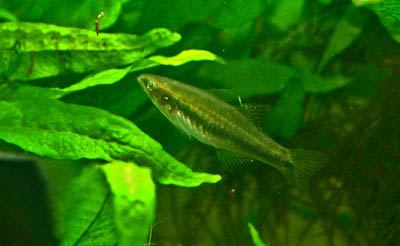

Conservation status
- Data Deficient (IUCN 3.1)

Scientific classification
- Kingdom: Animalia
- Phylum: Chordata
- Class: Actinopterygii
- Division: Teleostei
- Order: Gobiiformes
- Family: Eleotridae
- Genus: Hypseleotris
- Species: H. cyprinoides

Binomial name
- Hypseleotris cyprinoides (Valenciennes, 1837)

Synonyms
- Eleotris cyprinoides Valenciennes, 1837; Eleotris leuciscus Bleeker, 1853; Hypseleotris leuciscus (Bleeker 1853); Eleotris taenionotopterus Bleeker, 1856; Eleotris tohizonae Steindachner, 1880; Eleotris foizonae Sauvage, 1891; Eleotris pectoralis Regan, 1903; Agonostomus bryanti Bean & Weed, 1912; Hypseleotris dayi J. L. B. Smith, 1950

= Hypseleotris cyprinoides =

Species of fish

Hypseleotris cyprinoides, the tropical carp-gudgeon, tropical bitterling-gudgeon, golden carp-gudgeon, golden sleeper or rainbow prigi, is a species of freshwater ray-finned fish belonging to the family Eleotridae, the spinycheek sleepers or bullies. This species may be a species complex and may be split into a number of new species. H. cyprinoides, as defined by the International Union for Conservation of Nature is found in the Western Indian Ocean and the Western Pacific Ocean.

== Taxonomy ==
Hypseleotris cyprinoides was first formally described as Eleotris cyprinoides in 1837 by the French zoologist Achille Valenciennes in volume 12 of Histoire naturelle des poissons with its type locality given as the Saint-Maurice River, Réunion, western Mascarenes. In 1863 the American naturalist Theodore Gill described the genus Hypseleotris with Eleotris cyprinoides designated as its type species, as well as being the type species by monotypy. The genus Hypseleotris is classified in the family Eleotridae, which is classified within the suborder Gobioidei, the gobies, of the order Gobiiformes, which also includes the cardinalfishes and sand divers.

== Etymology ==
Hypseleotris cyprinoides is the type species of the genus Hypseleotris, this name combines hypsēlós, meaning "high" or "tall", an allusion Gill did not explain, it might refer to the rather arched dorsal profile of this species, combined with Eleotris, the type genus of the family Eleotridae. The specific name, cyprinoides, suffixes -oides, meaning "form" or "shape", onto cyprinus, an allusion to the similarity, as perceived by Valenciennes, of this species to the European cyprinid the common bleak (Alburnus alburnus) then thought to be in the genus Cyprinus.

== Description ==
Hypseleotris cyprinoides has a fusiform body and it reaches a maximum standard length of 8 cm (3.1 in). This species has two dorsal fins, the first typically has 6 spines and the second has 1 spine and between 7 and 9 soft rays. The anal fin has a single spine and 9 to 11 soft rays. There is a thin, vertical blackish barr over the base of the pectoral fin, a variably defined black spot on the lower lobe of the caudal fin. The second dorsal fin has rows of black and white ocelli, most strongly defined on the lower rearof the fin.

== Distribution and habitat ==
Hypseleotris cyprinoides was thought to be a widespread species in the Indian and Western Pacific Oceans but it is now understood to be a species complex, with most species being in Australia. The species limits in this taxon are still being worked out. H. cyprinoides is found in southeastern Africa in KwaZulu-Natal, the Comoro Islands and, possibly Réunion. It is then found in the Western Pacific Ocean in Indonesia, Papua New Guinea, Philippines, Taiwan, Japan, Palau, Fiji and Samoa. The adults are found in clear freshwater streams and small rivers, normally well upstream from any tidal influence. It has been reported 5–10 km (3.1–6.2 mi) upstream from the sea in New Guinea. The tropical carp gudgeon prefers the shallow vegetated margins of freshwater streams which flow into estuaries.
