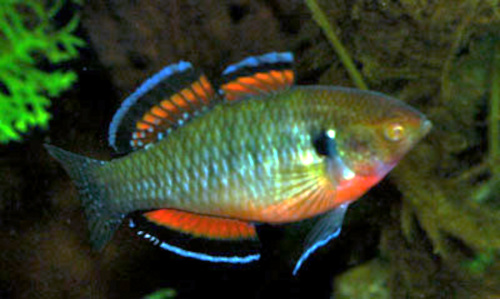

Conservation status
- Least Concern (IUCN 3.1)

Scientific classification
- Kingdom: Animalia
- Phylum: Chordata
- Class: Actinopterygii
- Order: Gobiiformes
- Family: Eleotridae
- Genus: Hypseleotris
- Species: H. compressa

Binomial name
- Hypseleotris compressa (Krefft, 1864)

Synonyms
- Eleotris compressus Krefft, 1864

= Hypseleotris compressa =

Species of fish

Hypseleotris compressa, the empire gudgeon, is a species of Gobiiform fish in the family Eleotridae endemic to Australia and south-central New Guinea.

== Taxonomy ==
Gerard Krefft described the empire gudgeon in 1864 as Eleotris compressus, having been discovered by one James F. Wilcox.

== Description ==
H. compressa has an elongated body which can be up to 12 cm (4.7 in) long. The males are larger than the females. The fish does not have a lateral line, but does have ctenoid scales.

Its color varies, but the fish generally has a yellowish-tan to golden-brown head, although it can occasionally be a dark brown. Its abdomen is usually a whitish-red color. During the off-breeding seasons, males can be identified by prominent, variously colored bands on their anal and dorsal fins. The caudal fin is a "dusky" colour, and the pectoral and pelvic fins have no colour. During the breeding season, the male's colors brighten significantly, turning a red-orange colour, and they sometimes appear to glow. The male fish uses his colors to attract a mate. The species can quickly change color as needed.

== Distribution and habitat ==
The H. compressa population is mostly concentrated in the northern and eastern portions of Australia and south-central New Guinea. It has also been found in the Torres Strait, around Muralag and Horn Island.

The fish is most commonly found in freshwater flowing rivers or streams, but is also found in still water and can withstand sea water level salinity. It is usually found in the lower reaches of rivers, but can also live upstream. It swims amongst aquatic plants and branches, and sometimes hides among rocks, using them as "caves".

== Behaviour ==
The fish is omnivorous, primarily taking small crustaceans and insects but will also consume algae and aquatic plants.

Spawning usually occurs in fresh water during warm weather; the breeding season generally spans from spring to autumn. After spawning with the male, the female fish lays rows of about 3,000 adhesive-coated eggs, each of which are about .32 mm long. The eggs stick to various surfaces, such as plants, logs, rocks, or sand. The male then fertilizes them with "sperm lines". The male guards the eggs until the young fish hatch, which usually takes 10–14 hours. After hatching, the young fish go downstream to estuaries, where their development takes place. Once grown, the fish return to fresh water. This spawning strategy, coupled with the very small size of the newborn fry, has hindered efforts at propagating this species for aquariums, though it has been accomplished by accident in shrimp aquaculture ponds.

A controlled study comparing six native fish species with the introduced (and invasive) eastern mosquitofish (Gambusia holbrooki) on consuming larvae of the common banded mosquito (Culex annulirostris) in Brisbane found that the empire gudgeon was as efficient at eating mosquito larvae as the eastern mosquitofish and is a good candidate for mosquito control.
