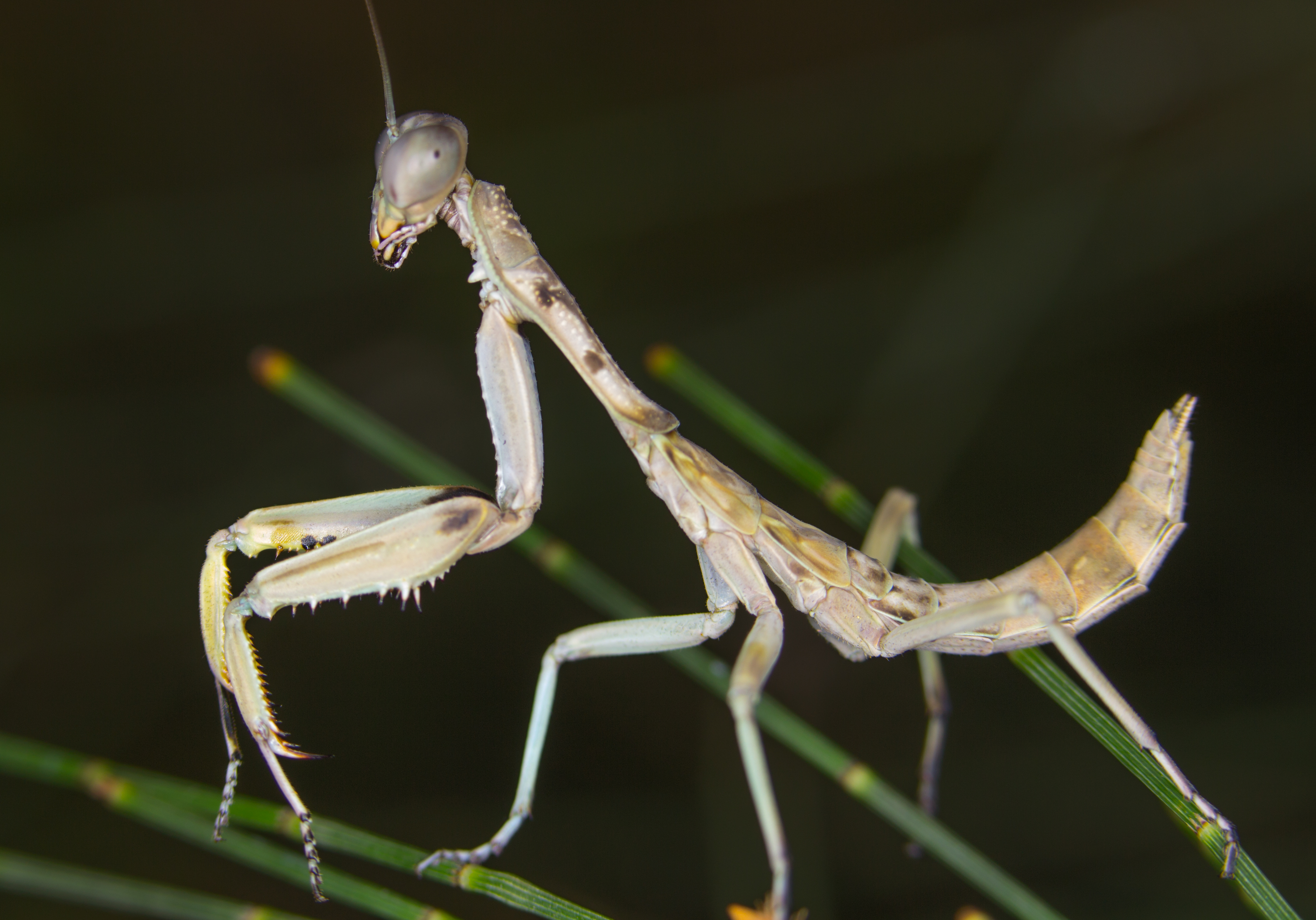

Scientific classification
- Kingdom: Animalia
- Phylum: Arthropoda
- Clade: Pancrustacea
- Class: Insecta
- Order: Mantodea
- Family: Mantidae
- Genus: Sphodropoda
- Species: S. tristis

Binomial name
- Sphodropoda tristis (Saussure, 1871)

Synonyms
- Sphodropoda mjobergi Sjostedt, 1918; Sphodropoda moesta Giglio-Tos, 1911; Sphodropoda papua Beier, 1965

= Burying mantis =

Species of praying mantis

The burying mantis (Sphodropoda tristis) is a species of mantis native to Australia. They are grey/brown or green, frequently with mottled patterning on the wings, and a have distinctive pale tubercles on the forelegs. Both sexes can reach lengths of up to 70 mm. Their common name comes from the behaviour of females, which infrequently bury their oothecae underground.

== See also ==
- Mantises of Oceania
- List of mantis genera and species
