= Hypseleotris galii =

Conservation status
- Least Concern (IUCN 3.1)

Scientific classification
- Kingdom: Animalia
- Phylum: Chordata
- Class: Actinopterygii
- Order: Gobiiformes
- Family: Eleotridae
- Genus: Hypseleotris
- Species: H. galii

Binomial name
- Hypseleotris galii (Ogilby, 1898)

Synonyms
- Carassiops galii Ogilby, 1898

Species of fish

Hypseleotris galii, commonly known as the firetail gudgeon, fire-tailed gudgeon, or Gale's carp-gudgeon, is a species of gudgeon endemic to coastal eastern Australia.

== Distribution and habitat ==
Hypseleotris galii is native to the coastal freshwater waterways of eastern Australia, ranging from Water Park Creek in central Queensland to the Georges River in central New South Wales, as well as Bribie Island, Fraser Island, Moreton Island and North Stradbroke Island. It has also been translocated to parts of the Murray-Darling basin where it is not native. It is a demersal species that inhabits streams, rivers, floodplains, wetlands, dune lakes, dams, and weirs.

== Description ==
Hypseleotris galii is a small greyish or bronze coloured fish with dark edges on the scales and a silver belly, though colouration varies based on age, habitat, and season. The standard length of males is around 5.5 cm (2.2 in), with females slightly smaller at around 4 cm (1.6 in). Breeding males are darker, with red edges on the dorsal and anal fins and a reddish-orange caudal fin. Adult females have clear fins and a dark patch around the genitalia, with gravid females developing an orange or pink belly.

== Ecology ==
Hypseleotris galii lives for two to three years in the wild, feeding mostly on insects and small crustaceans such as cladocerans and ostracods.

This species is oviparous and spawns from October to January. Females lay between 25 and 440 eggs, attaching them to the undersides of leaves, logs, shells, or stones, where they are guarded by the male parent until they hatch. Juveniles feed on zooplankton.
