= Philypnodon macrostomus =

Scientific classification
- Kingdom: Animalia
- Phylum: Chordata
- Class: Actinopterygii
- Order: Gobiiformes
- Family: Eleotridae
- Genus: Philypnodon
- Species: P. macrostomus

Binomial name
- Philypnodon macrostomus Hoese & Reader, 2006

Species of fish

The dwarf flathead gudgeon (Philypnodon macrostomus) is a species of sleeper goby endemic to eastern Australia.

== Taxonomy ==
The existence of a second smaller species related to the flathead gudgeon (Philypnodon grandiceps) had been strongly suspected since 1980. P. macrostomus was described in 2006 by Douglass Fielding Hoese and Sally Reader; the type specimen was collected in Glenreagh, New South Wales. Its species name derived from the Ancient Greek makro "large" and stoma "mouth". Genetic analysis of the species from the different river drainages across its range showed that populations from the Lang Lang River in Victoria had diverged much earlier and most likely represent a separate, as yet undescribed species.

== Description ==
Predominantly dark brown, the dwarf flathead gudgeon has paler brown or orange belly and reaches 5 cm (2 in) in length, though more regularly is around 3.5 to 4 cm (1.4 to 1.6 in). It has dark brown lips. It can be distinguished from the flathead gudgeon, which is larger, has a wider gill opening, and has vertical stripes on the sides of the belly.

== Distribution and habitat ==
The dwarf flathead gudgeon is found in estuaries and freshwater rivers from Baffle Creek in central Queensland through New South Wales and eastern Victoria to Wilsons Promontory. Inland the range extends westward along the Murray River into South Australia. In the southern parts of its range, it is more restricted to estuarine habitats, and is found further upstream in more northerly river drainages.

The dwarf flathead gudgeon is commonly found alongside its larger relative, and often near some form of cover such as submerged vegetation or rocks.

== Feeding ==
Carnivorous, the dwarf flathead gudgeon eats insects and minute crustaceans.

== Breeding ==
The male guards the eggs after they are laid. The dwarf flathead gudgeon is mature by one year of age, though its longevity is unknown.
