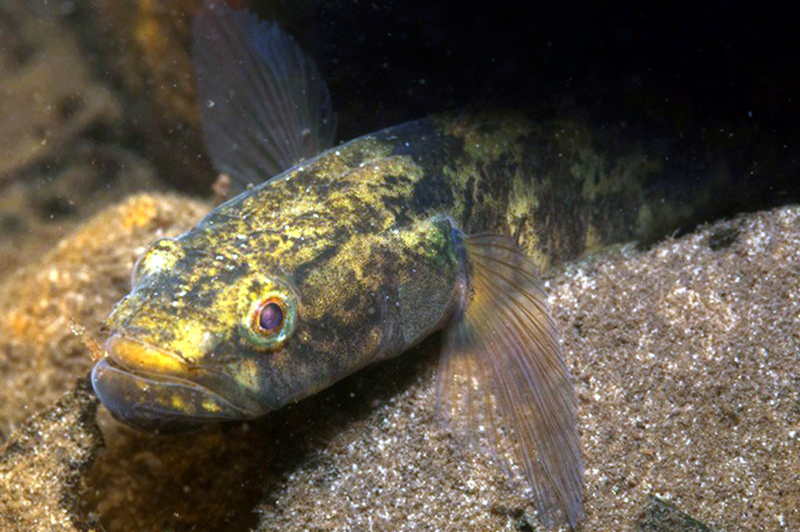
- A Flathead Gudgeon, Philypnodon grandiceps, at Halls Gap, Grampians, Victoria

Scientific classification
- Kingdom: Animalia
- Phylum: Chordata
- Class: Actinopterygii
- Division: Teleostei
- Order: Gobiiformes
- Family: Eleotridae
- Genus: Philypnodon
- Species: P. grandiceps

Binomial name
- Philypnodon grandiceps J. L. G. Krefft

Synonyms
- Eleotris grandiceps Krefft, 1864

= Philypnodon grandiceps =

Species of fish

The flathead gudgeon (Philypnodon grandiceps) is a species of fish in the family Eleotridae endemic to eastern Australia.

== Taxonomy ==
Gerard Krefft described the flathead gudgeon in 1864 as Eleotris grandiceps, recording it from the Upper Hawkesbury River and its tributaries, and freshwater lagoons near Richmond, Eastern Creek, and Bronte. Alternate names include big-headed gudgeon, bull head, bull-headed gudgeon, collundera, and Yarra gudgeon.

== Description ==
The flathead gudgeon generally grows to about 8 cm (3.2 in) in length, though large individuals up to 11 or 12 cm (4.5 in) have been recorded. It has a large, flattened head and large mouth, which extends back past the eyes, and two short dorsal fins. The upperparts can be various shades of grey, brown, black, or yellowish, with yellowish underparts. The flathead gudgeon can be distinguished from the dwarf flathead gudgeon (Philypnodon macrostomus) by barred lines on its flanks, larger size (the latter species only reaching 5 cm (2 in) long), and wide gill openings.

== Distribution and habitat ==
The flathead gudgeon is found in estuaries and freshwater rivers from just north of the Fitzroy River in central Queensland through New South Wales and Victoria to the Gawler River in South Australia, as well as some parts of northern Tasmania.

== Feeding ==
Carnivorous, the flathead gudgeon preys upon small fish, tadpoles, and aquatic arthropods. It, in turn, has been recorded as prey of the yellow-billed spoonbill.

== Breeding ==
The female lays 500–1000 elongated eggs on a hard surface in spring, which are watched over afterwards by the male.
