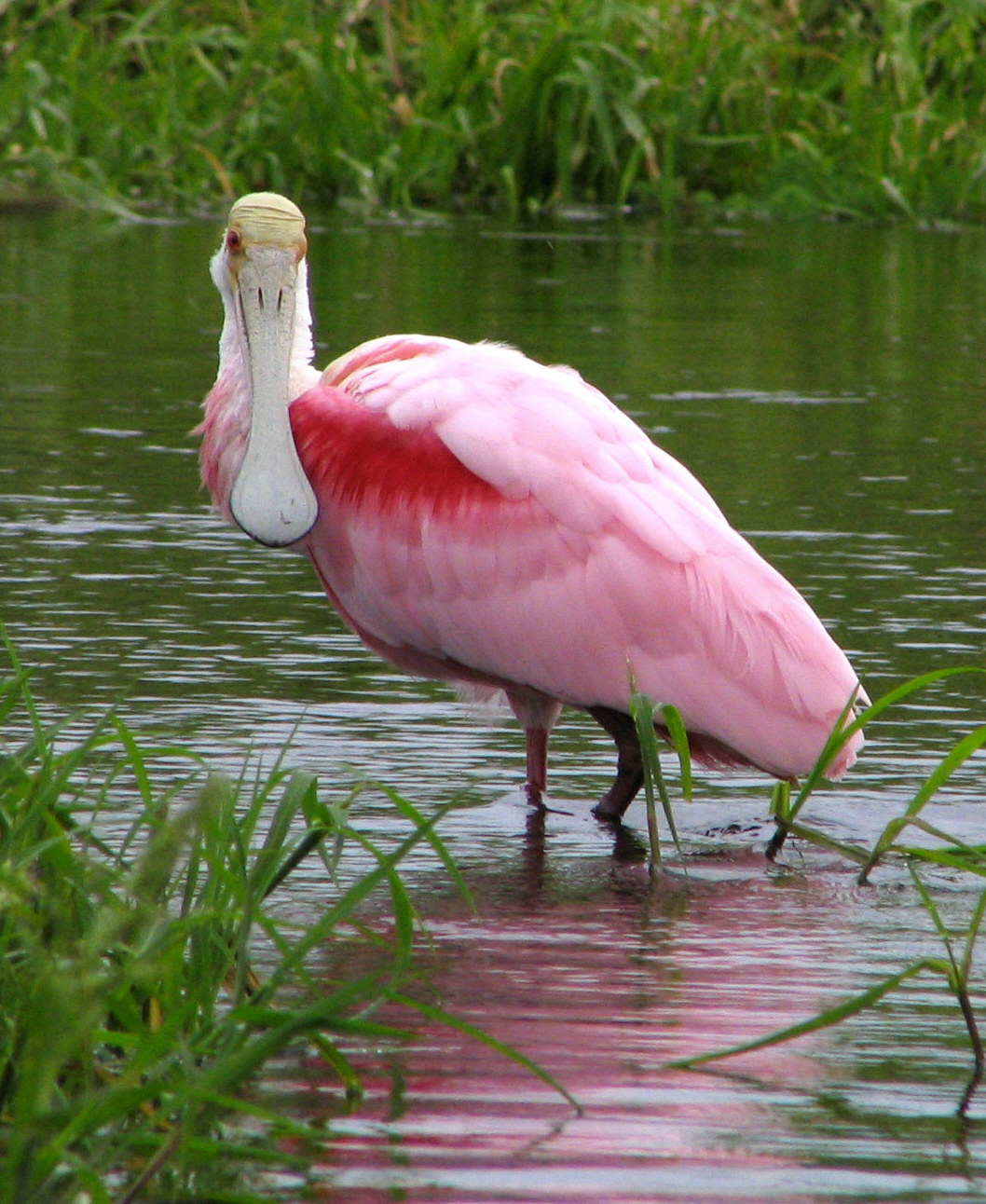
- Roseate spoonbill

Scientific classification
- Kingdom: Animalia
- Phylum: Chordata
- Class: Aves
- Order: Pelecaniformes
- Family: Threskiornithidae
- Subfamily: Plataleinae; Bonaparte, 1838
- Genus: Platalea; Linnaeus, 1758

Type species
- Platalea leucorodia Linnaeus, 1758

Species
- See text.

= Spoonbill =

Spoonbills

Genus of birds

Spoonbills are a genus, Platalea, of large, long-legged wading birds. The spoonbills have a global distribution, being found on every continent except Antarctica. The genus name Platalea derives from Ancient Greek and means "broad", referring to the distinctive shape of the bill. Six species are recognised, which although usually placed in a single genus have sometimes been split into three genera.

All spoonbills have large, flat, spatulate bills and feed by wading through shallow water, sweeping the partly opened bill from side to side. The moment any small aquatic creature touches the inside of the bill—an insect, crustacean, or tiny fish—it is snapped shut. Spoonbills generally prefer fresh water to salt but are found in both environments. They need to feed many hours each day.

== Taxonomy ==
The genus Platalea was introduced in 1758 by the Swedish naturalist Carl Linnaeus in 1758 in the tenth edition of his Systema Naturae. The genus name is Latin for "spoonbill" and is derived from the Ancient Greek platea meaning "broad", referring to the distinctive shape of the bill. The type species was designated as the Eurasian spoonbill (Platalea leucorodia) by George Robert Gray in 1840.

They have traditionally been thought to form one of two subfamilies, Plataleinae, in the family Threskiornithidae, which also includes the ibises (Threskiornithinae). Molecular studies, including a 2013 study, have suggested instead that they form a clade within the family with several cosmopolitan ibis genera, separate from another clade of New World ibises.

A 2010 study of mitochondrial DNA of the spoonbills found that the roseate and yellow-billed spoonbills were each other's closest relative, and the two were descended from an early offshoot from the ancestors of the other four spoonbill species. The study concluded from the genetic evidence that it was equally valid to consider all six to be classified within the genus Platalea, or alternatively for two of the species to be placed in monotypic genera named as Platibis and Ajaja. However, as the six species were so similar morphologically, keeping them within the one genus made more sense.

== Description ==
Spoonbills are most easily distinguished from ibises in the shape of their bill, which is long and flat and wider at the end. The nostrils are located near the base of the bill so that the bird can breathe while the bill is submerged in water. The eyes are positioned to provide spoonbills with binocular vision, although, when foraging, tactile senses are important too. Like ibises, spoonbills have bare patches of skin around the bill and eyes.

== Breeding ==
Spoonbills are monogamous, but, so far as is known, only for one season at a time. Most species nest in trees or reed beds, often with ibises or herons. The male gathers nesting material, mostly sticks and reeds, sometimes taken from an old nest; the female weaves it into a large, shallow bowl or platform which varies in its shape and structural integrity according to species.

The female lays a clutch of about three smooth, oval, white eggs and both parents incubate; chicks hatch one at a time rather than all together. The newly hatched young are blind and cannot care for themselves immediately; both parents feed them by partial regurgitation. Chicks' bills are short and straight, and only gain the characteristic spoonbill shape as they mature. Their feeding continues for a few weeks longer after the family leaves the nest. The primary cause of brood failure appears not to be predation but starvation.

== Species and distribution ==
The six species of spoonbill are distributed over much of the warm temperate and tropical regions of the world.

Species of Platalea
Common and scientific names	Image	Description	Range
Roseate spoonbill (Platalea ajaja)		Adults are large with pink feathers.	South America, the Caribbean, and the Southeastern United States
Yellow-billed spoonbill (Platalea flavipes)		A white spoonbill with a yellow bill.	Throughout Mainland Australia; very rare vagrant in Tasmania and New Zealand
African spoonbill (Platalea alba)		A large white species similar to Eurasian spoonbill, from which it can be distinguished by its pink face and usually paler bill. Its food includes insects and other small creatures, and it nests in trees, marshes or rocks.	Africa and Madagascar
Eurasian spoonbill (Platalea leucorodia)		Adults and juveniles are largely white with black outer wing-tips and dark bills and legs. Breeds in reed beds, usually without other species.	Northeast of Africa and much of Eurasia from the British Isles across to Japan
Royal spoonbill (Platalea regia)		A large white spoonbill with a black face.	Throughout Australia and New Zealand (particularly the South Island); vagrants in Papua New Guinea, Indonesia, and Pacific Islands
Black-faced spoonbill (Platalea minor)		Closely related to Eurasian spoonbills.	East Asia: Taiwan, China, Korea and Japan
