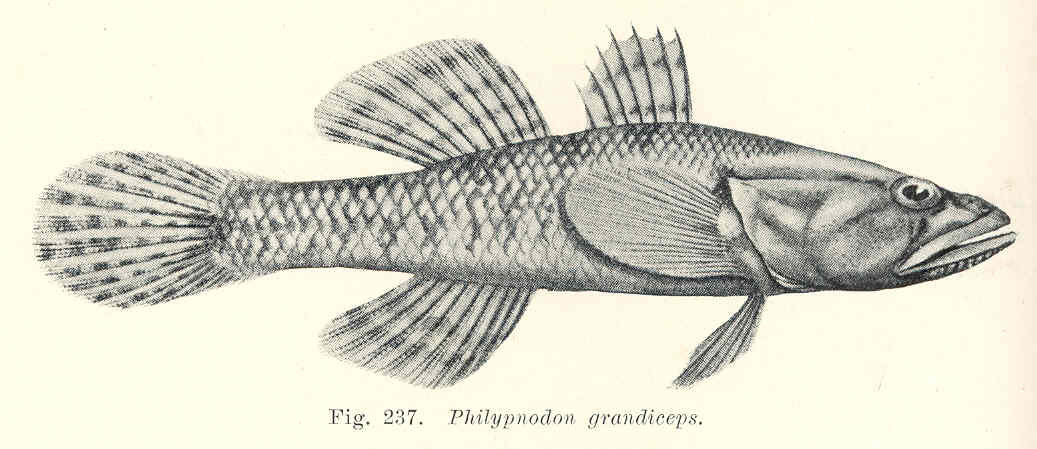
- Philypnodon grandiceps

Scientific classification
- Kingdom: Animalia
- Phylum: Chordata
- Class: Actinopterygii
- Order: Gobiiformes
- Family: Eleotridae
- Genus: Philypnodon; Bleeker, 1874

Type species
- Eleotris nudiceps Castelnau, 1872

= Philypnodon =

Genus of fishes

Philypnodon is a genus of fishes in the family Eleotridae endemic to Australia and the coastal waters around it.

== Species ==
Two species in this genus are recognized, though molecular studies indicate another undescribed species similar to the dwarf flathead gudgeon from the Lang Lang River in Victoria.

- Philypnodon grandiceps (J. L. G. Krefft, 1864) (flathead gudgeon)
- Philypnodon macrostomus Hoese & Reader, 2006 (dwarf flathead gudgeon)
