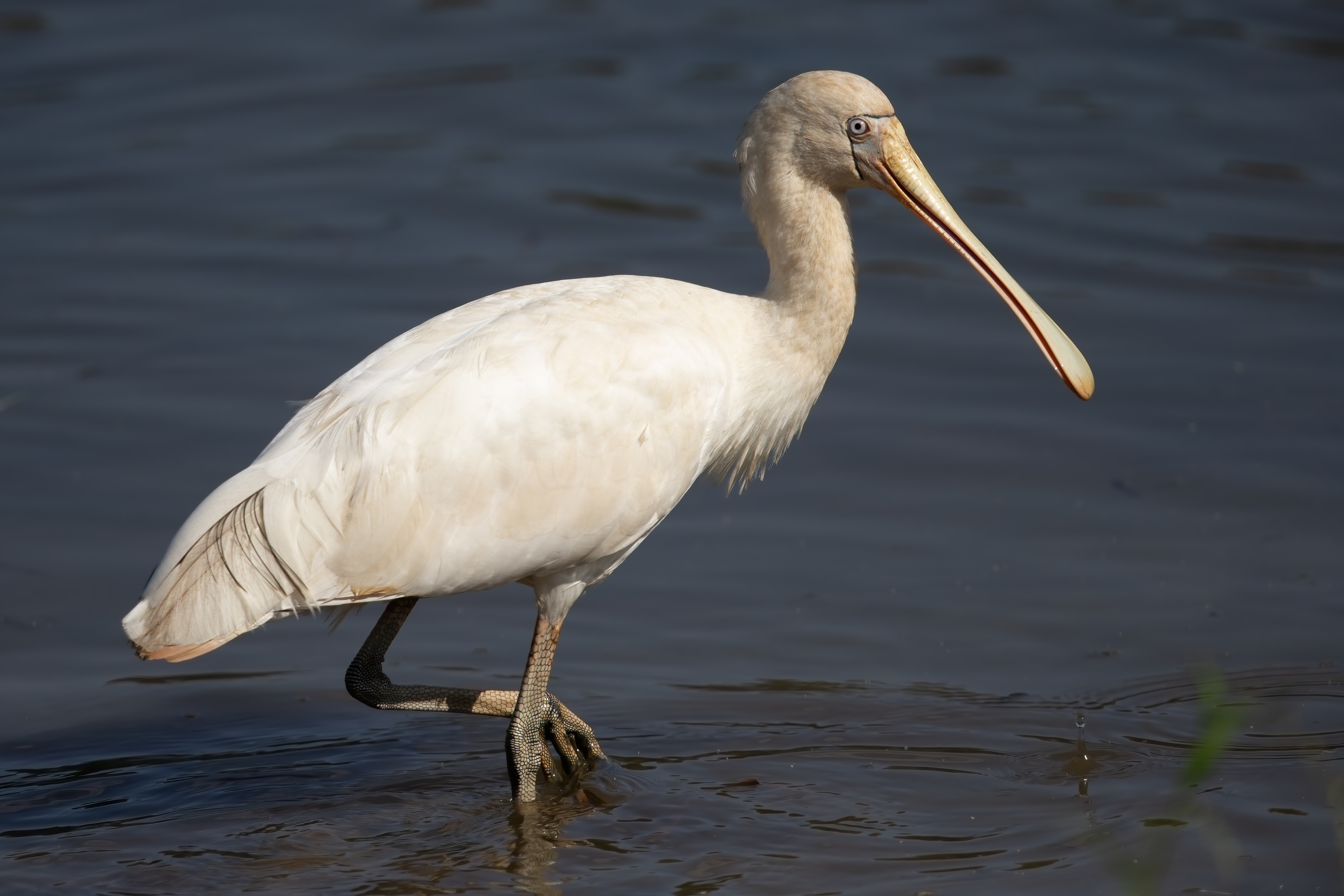

Conservation status
- Least Concern (IUCN 3.1)

Scientific classification
- Kingdom: Animalia
- Phylum: Chordata
- Class: Aves
- Order: Pelecaniformes
- Family: Threskiornithidae
- Genus: Platalea
- Species: P. flavipes

Binomial name
- Platalea flavipes Gould, 1838

Synonyms
- Platibis flavipes

= Yellow-billed spoonbill =

Species of bird

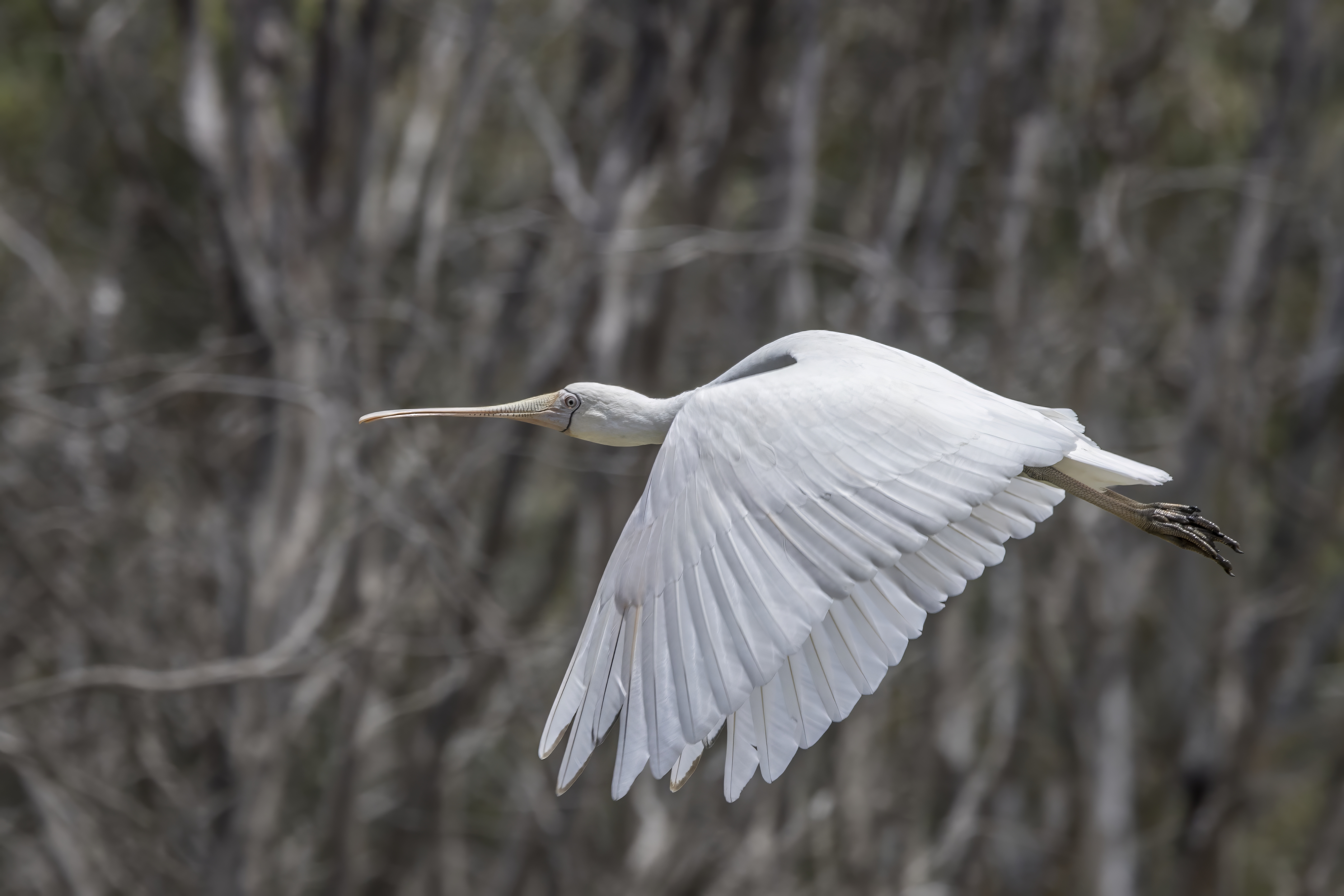
Over Murray River, South Australia

The yellow-billed spoonbill (Platalea flavipes) is a gregarious wading bird of the ibis and spoonbill family, Threskiornithidae. It is native to Australia, and is a vagrant to New Zealand, Lord Howe Island and Norfolk Island.

== Taxonomy ==
The renowned ornithologist John Gould first described the yellow-billed spoonbill, naming it Platalea flavipes although noting its distinctness from other members of the genus. Bonaparte erected the genus Platibis in 1856, and Gould followed this classification in his later work. He noted the species appeared in great numbers across New South Wales in 1839, particularly in the north between the Hunter and lower Namoi Rivers. The year had been wet, in contrast to droughts in previous years.

A 2010 study of mitochondrial DNA of the spoonbills by Chesser and colleagues found that the yellow-billed and roseate spoonbills were each other's closest relative, and the two were descended from an early offshoot from the ancestors of the other four spoonbill species. They felt the genetic evidence meant it was equally valid to consider all six to be classified within the genus Platalea or alternatively the two placed in the monotypic genera Platibis and Ajaia respectively. However, as the six species were so similar morphologically, keeping them within the one genus made more sense.

== Description ==
Measuring around 90 cm (35.5 in), the yellow-billed spoonbill has all white plumage. The long spoon-shaped bill, bare-skinned face, legs and feet are all yellow, while the iris is pale yellow. The sexes are similar in plumage and coloration. In the breeding season, the face is lined with black, long hackles develop on the chest, and the wings have black tips. The bill of the yellow-billed spoonbill is narrower and works more like a forceps than the larger-ended and more spoon-like bill of the royal spoonbill, which acts like a pair of tongs. Like all members of the ibis and spoonbill family, it always flies with its head extended.

== Distribution and habitat ==
The yellow-billed spoonbill is found across eastern, northern and southwestern Australia, particularly around water, and has been recorded as a vagrant to New Zealand, Lord Howe Island and Norfolk Island. It is not found in Tasmania. It nests in trees, marshes or reed-beds, and often roosts in trees. It occurs in shallows of wetlands, and occasionally on dry pasture.

== Feeding ==
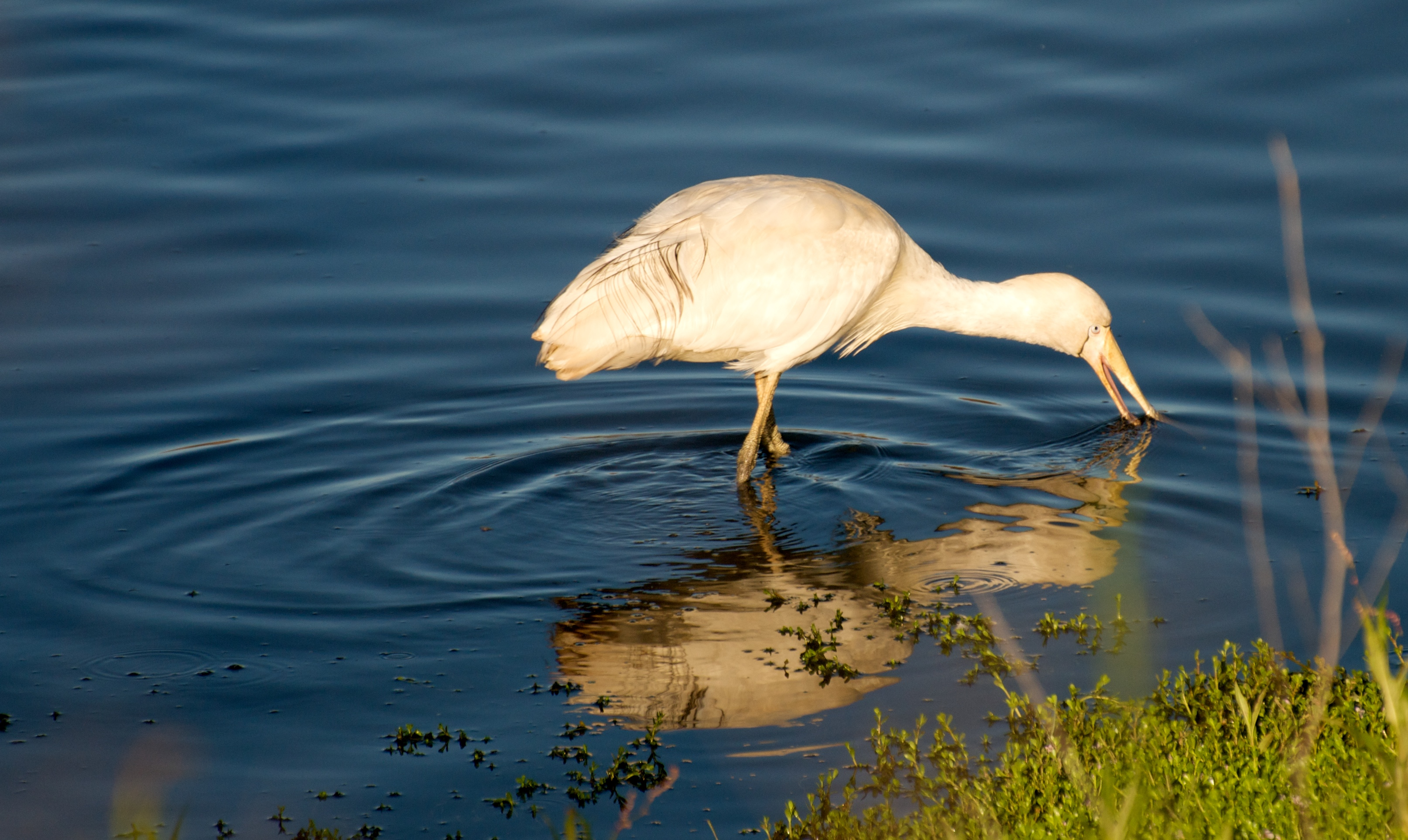
Yellow-billed spoonbill feeding at Lake Monger by sweeping its bill through the water

The yellow-billed spoonbill is carnivorous, catching small animals by sweeping its bill through shallow water and swallowing prey once it is detected. When slow sweeping, the spoonbill walks with the bill at an angle at about 60 degrees to horizontal and with the bill tip open about 2 to 4 cm (1 to 1.5 in), sweeping an arc of around 120 degrees in front of the bird. The bird walks slowly, kicking up debris and small animals from the bottom of the water, which it then senses and catches with its bill. When an item is detected, the spoonbill switches to intensive sweeping of a small area.

The yellow-billed spoonbill has a row of small blunt knobs known as papillae which line the margins of the upper and lower mandible of the "spoon". These are sensory structures which help the bird sense vibration and hence seize its prey.

One field study at Lake Cowal in New South Wales found the water depth selected for feeding to be less than 40 cm (15.5 in). As well as lakes and swamps, the birds feed in paddocks inundated after heavy rain. Foraging occurs both during the day and at night.

Yellow-billed spoonbills also probe submerged plants directly for prey, and seize prey such as spiders above ground. They have been observed dragging their bills alongside themselves through shallow water while walking.

Prey items recorded at Lake Cowal include freshwater crustaceans such as the common yabby (Cherax destructor); shrimp of the genus Macrobrachium and family Atyidae; insects, particularly aquatic bugs of the families Notonectidae and Corixidae; fish such as mosquitofish (Gambusia affinis) and flathead gudgeon (Philypnodon grandiceps); and occasionally freshwater snails and plant material such as medic burr (Medicago polymorpha).

== Breeding ==
Atkinson's Dam, SE Queensland, Australia

The yellow-billed spoonbill nests once or twice a year, generally when water is plentiful. The breeding season varies: it is usually March to May after the wet season in the north of the country, and in winter–spring (August to October) in more temperate areas. The nest is a platform constructed of sticks; it has a hollowed centre, and can be located on the branches or fork of a tree, the base of which is often submerged in water. Reed beds are another nest location. The clutch consists of two to four dull white eggs measuring 68 x 45 mm. Nests are often located in colonies, with other species such as the royal spoonbill, Australian white ibis, straw-necked ibis, as well as herons, egrets or cormorants.
