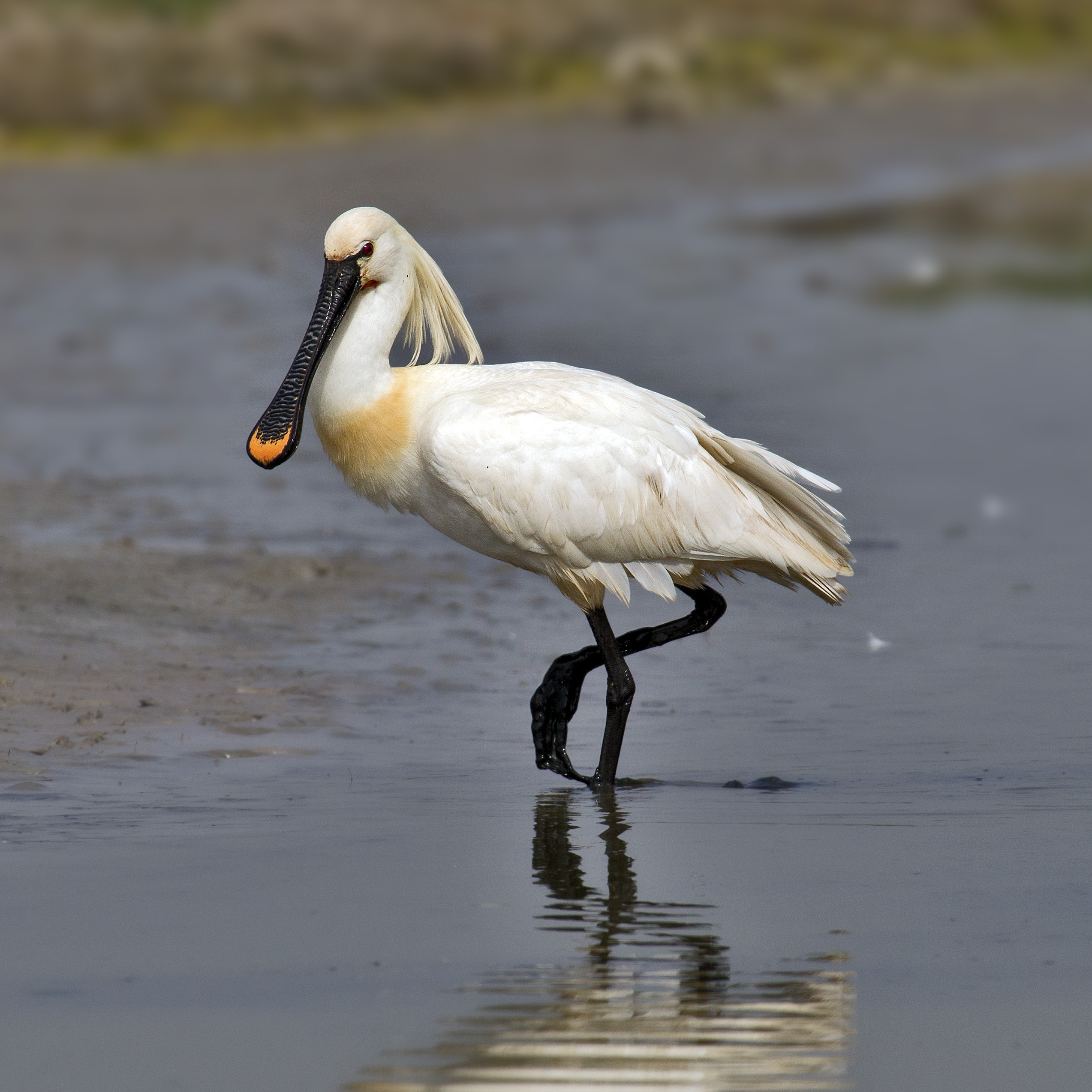
- Adult in breeding plumage

Conservation status
- Least Concern (IUCN 3.1)
- CITES Appendix II

Scientific classification
- Kingdom: Animalia
- Phylum: Chordata
- Class: Aves
- Order: Pelecaniformes
- Family: Threskiornithidae
- Genus: Platalea
- Species: P. leucorodia

Binomial name
- Platalea leucorodia Linnaeus, 1758
- Distribution Breeding (locally also wintering) Resident Wintering

= Eurasian spoonbill =

Species of bird

The Eurasian spoonbill (Platalea leucorodia), or common spoonbill, is a wading bird of the ibis and spoonbill family Threskiornithidae, native to Europe, Africa and Asia. The species is partially migratory with the more northerly breeding populations mostly migrating south for the winter.

== Taxonomy ==
The Eurasian spoonbill was formally described in 1758 by the Swedish naturalist Carl Linnaeus in the tenth edition of his Systema Naturae under the current binomial name Platalea leucorodia. Linnaeus cited works by earlier authors including the description and illustration by the English naturalist Eleazar Albin that was published in 1734. Linnaeus specified the type locality as Europe but restricted it to Sweden in 1761. The genus name Platalea is Latin and means "broad", referring to the distinctive shape of the bill; the specific epithet leucorodia is from Ancient Greek leukerodios meaning "spoonbill", itself derived from leukos, "white" and erodios "heron". A molecular phylogenetic study of the spoonbills based on mitochondrial DNA found that the Eurasian spoonbill is sister taxon to a clade containing the royal and black-faced spoonbills. In England it was traditionally known as the "shovelard", a name later used for the northern shoveler.

Three subspecies are recognised. These are listed below with their breeding ranges.

- P. l. leucorodia Linnaeus, 1758 – Europe to north China, India and Sri Lanka
- P. l. balsaci Naurois & Roux, F, 1974 – west Mauritania
- P. l. archeri Neumann, 1928 – coasts of the Red Sea and Somalia

The royal spoonbill (Platalea regia) was formerly considered as a subspecies. Birds in Asia were sometimes separated as P. l. major.

== Description ==
Eurasian spoonbill video

This species is almost unmistakable in most of its range. The breeding bird is all white except for its dark legs, black bill with a yellow tip, and a yellow breast patch like a pelican. It has a crest in the breeding season. Non-breeders lack the crest and breast patch, and immature birds have a pale bill and black tips to the primary flight feathers. Unlike herons, spoonbills fly with their necks outstretched. The Eurasian spoonbill differs from the African spoonbill with which in overlaps in winter, in that the latter species has a red face and legs, and no crest.

They are mostly silent. Even at their breeding colonies the main sounds are bill snapping, occasional deep grunting and occasional trumpeting noises.

== Distribution and habitat ==
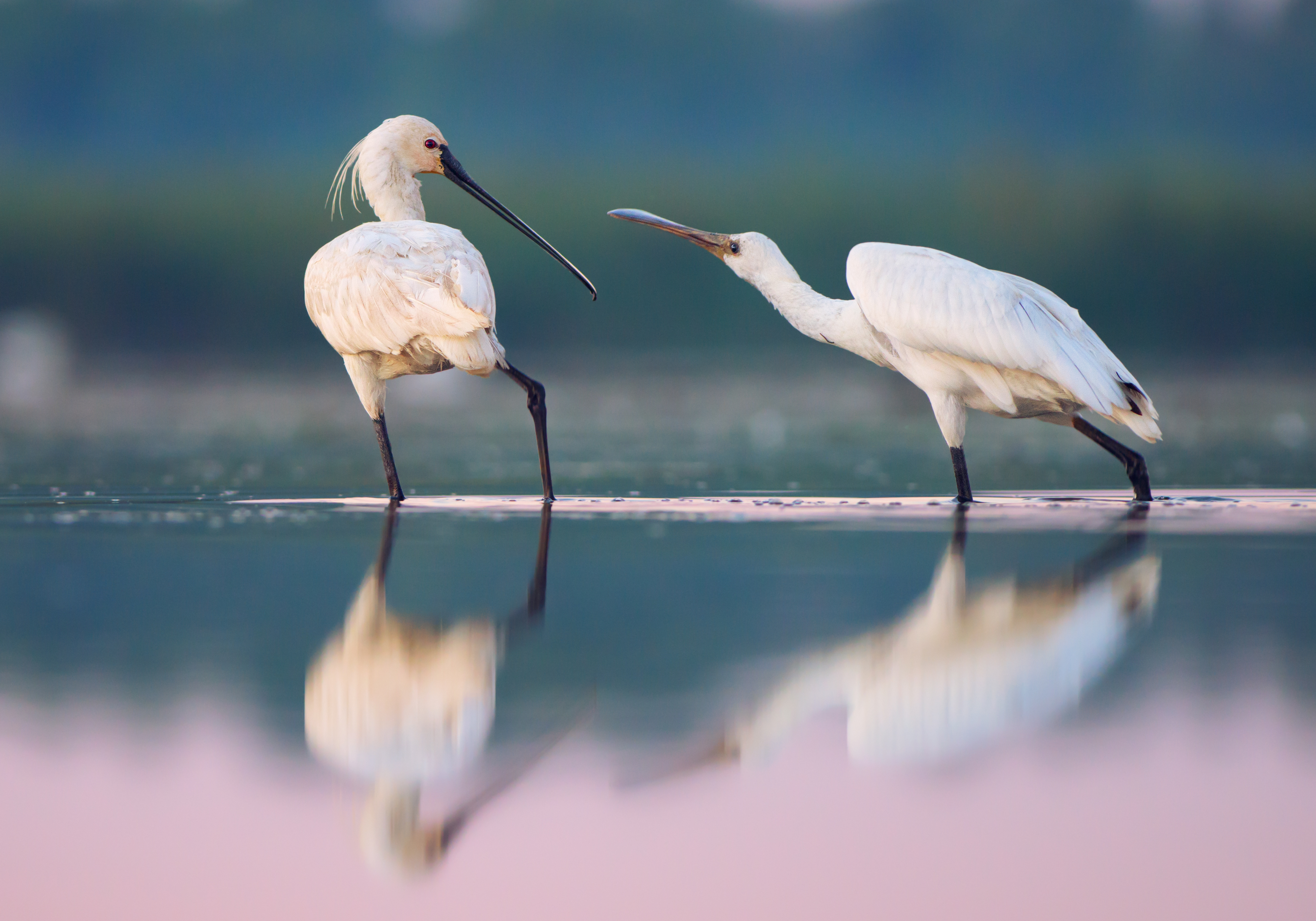
Common spoonbill in Danube Biosphere Reserve, Ukraine

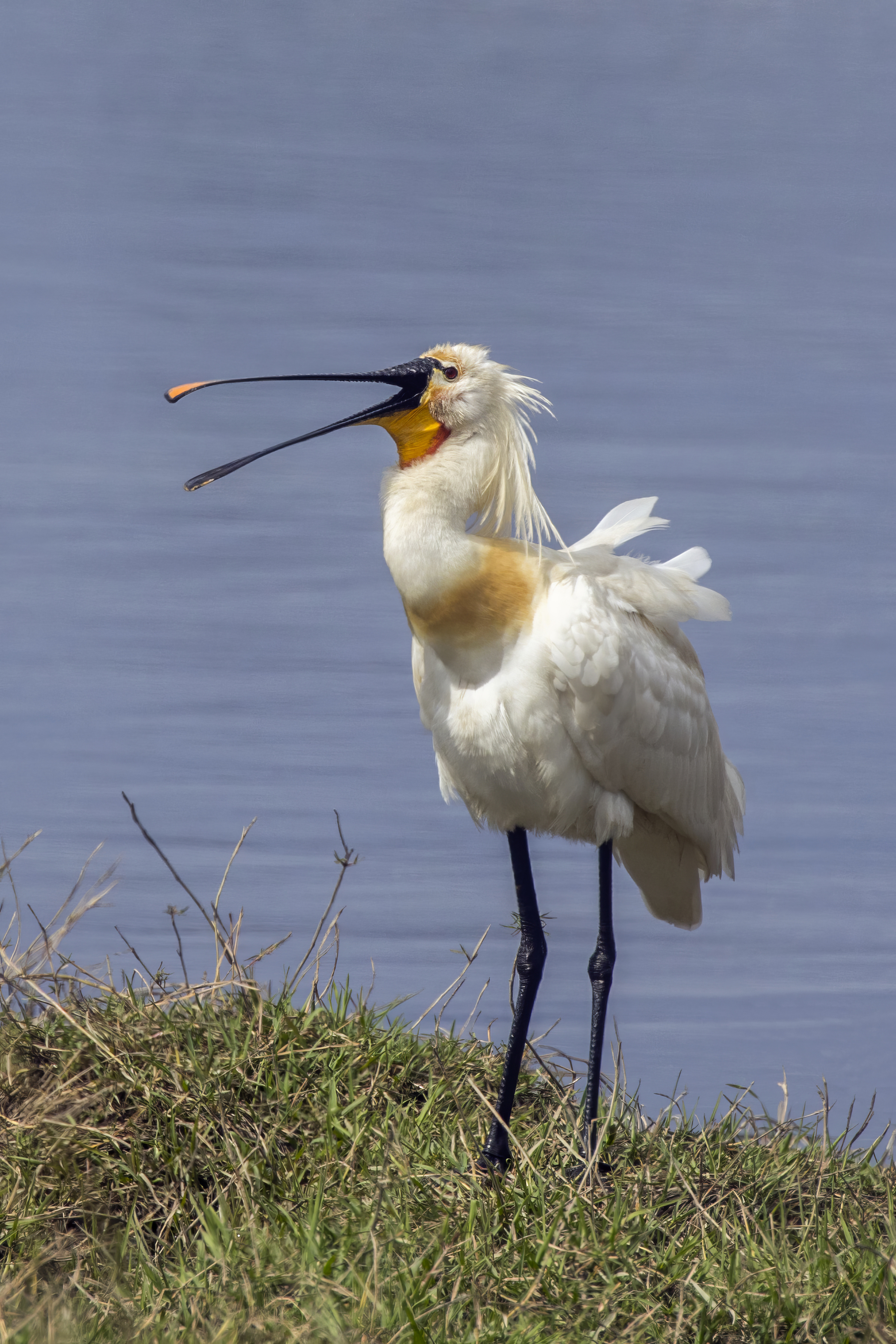
In breeding plumage, Spain

This species is found widely in Europe, Asia and Africa. In Europe, it breeds from the United Kingdom and Portugal in the west, locally through the continent; ranging north to Denmark and east to the Balkans and the Black Sea. In Asia, it breeds in a broad band across the central part of the continent, from the Black Sea to the Korean Peninsula, as well as Kuwait, southern Iraq, Iran, southern Pakistan, India and Sri Lanka. In Africa, it breeds locally in coastal Mauritania, but more widely along the Red Sea and Gulf of Aden coasts. Whereas those breeding in warmer parts of Asia, in Africa and the Iberian Peninsula are resident or only move locally, more northern breeders generally migrate south to winter in southwestern Europe, the northern half of Africa or warm parts of Asia. However, some northern birds do remain in the general region during the winter, including the United Kingdom, the Low Countries and France. Outside of its normal range, they have been recorded as a rare vagrant in Ireland, Belarus, Brazil, Trinidad and Tobago, the Canary Islands, Greenland, Nigeria, Uganda, Guadeloupe, Martinique, Barbados, and Saint Lucia.

Eurasian spoonbills show a preference for extensive, shallow wetlands with muddy clay or fine, sandy beds. They may inhabit any type of marsh, river, lake, floodplain or mangrove swamp, be it fresh, brackish or saline water. They are especially attracted to locations with undisturbed islands for nesting and habitats with dense, riparian-emergent vegetation (e.g. reedbeds) and scattered trees/shrubs, especially willow Salix spp., oak Quercus spp. or poplar Populus spp. Eurasian spoonbills may also frequent sheltered marine habitats during the winter, such as deltas, estuaries, tidal creeks and coastal lagoons.

== Behaviour and ecology ==
=== Breeding ===
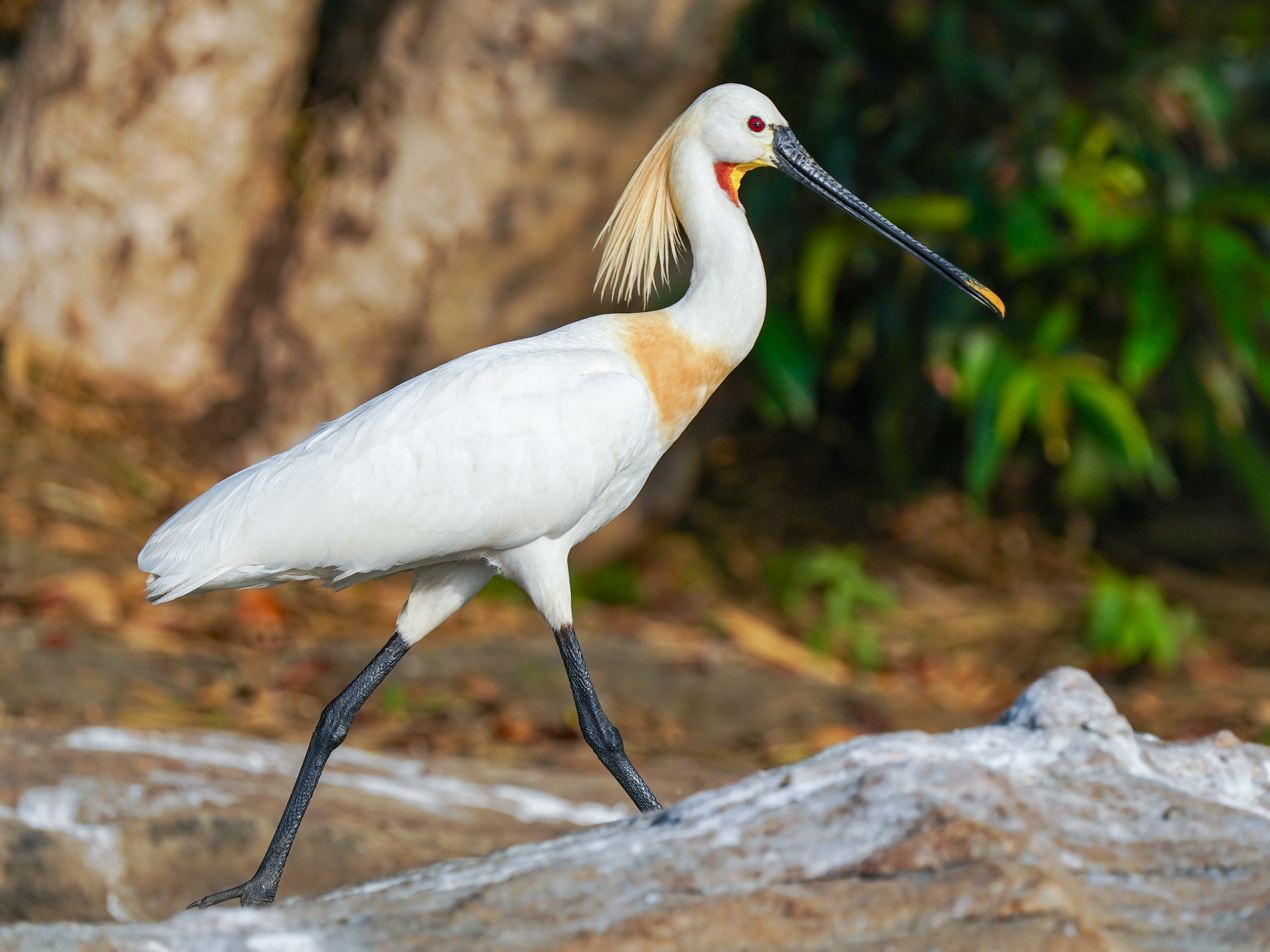
Migrant breeding in Ranganathittu, south India

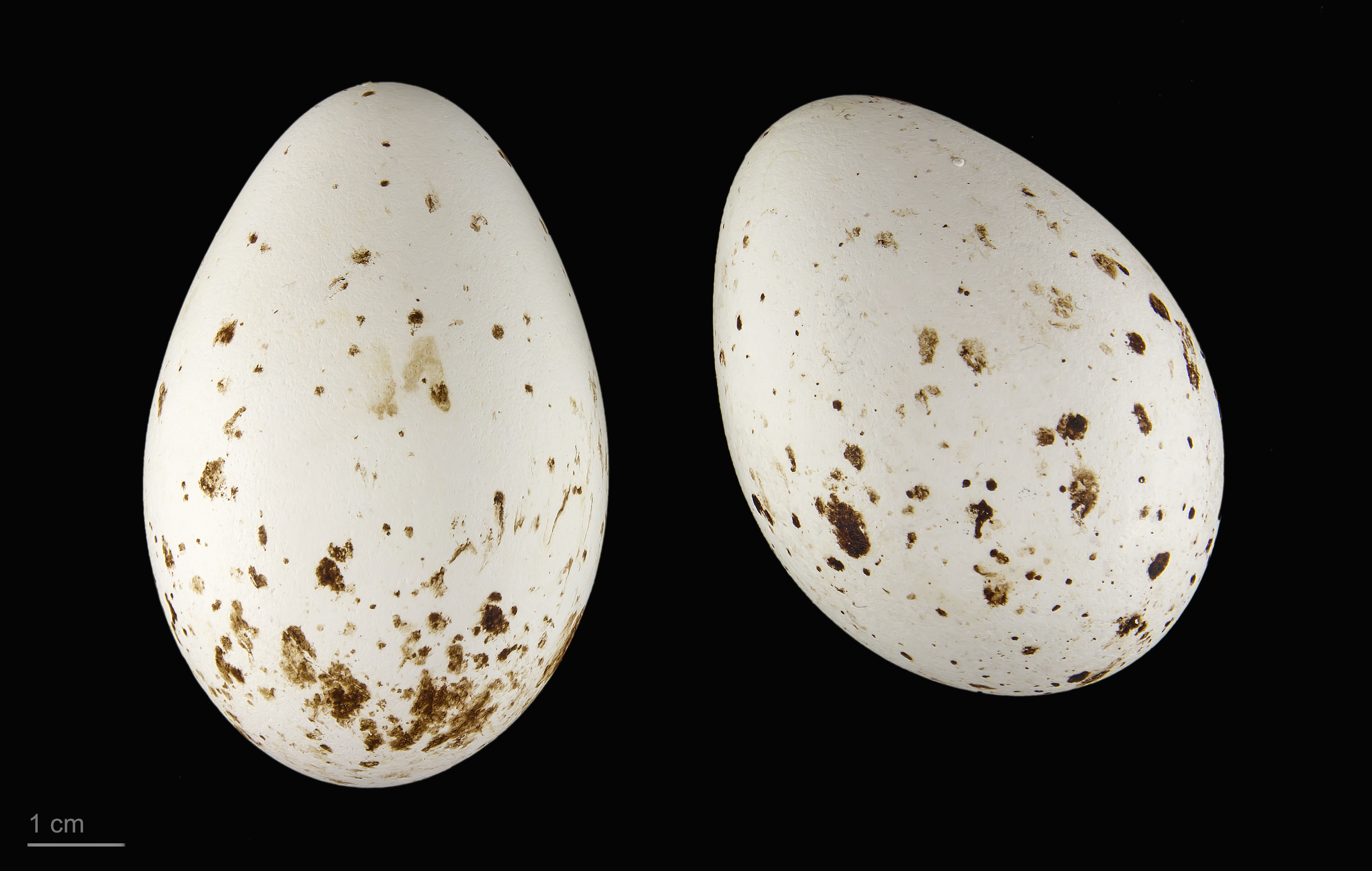
Museum specimen - île Kiji, Mauritania

In the Palearctic, the species breeds in spring (e.g. from April) but in tropical parts of its range it times breeding to coincide with rainfall. Breeding is normally in single species colonies or in small single species groups amidst mixed-species colonies of other waterbirds such as herons, egrets and cormorants. Most activity takes place during the morning and evening (although in coastal areas foraging is governed by tidal rhythms), they often roost communally in roosts which are up to 15 km (9.3 mi) away from the feeding areas.

The nest is a platform of sticks and vegetation which is either constructed on the ground on islands in lakes and rivers or in dense stands of reeds, bushes, mangroves or deciduous trees up to 5 m (16 ft) above the ground. Within colonies neighbouring nests are usually quite close together, no more than 1 or 2 m (3.3 or 6.6 ft) apart. Breeding colonies are normally sited within 10–15 km (6.2–9.3 mi) of feeding areas, often much less (although the species may also feed up to 35–40 km (22–25 mi) away).

=== Migration ===
More northerly breeding populations are fully migratory but may only migrate short distances while other, more southerly populations are resident and nomadic or partially migratory. Migration is usually conducted in flocks of up to 100 individuals. As with several bird species, spoonbills spend some days in stopover sites during migration. Spoonbills wintering in Africa facing long-distance travel stay for longer in a stopover site than spoonbills that perform a shorter migration. Stay duration is also determined by population size.

=== Food and feeding ===
The diet consists of aquatic insects, mollusks, newts, crustaceans, worms, leeches, frogs, tadpoles and small fish up to 10–15 cm (3.9–5.9 in) long. It may also take algae or small fragments of aquatic plants (although these are possibly ingested accidentally with animal matter). They use sideways sweeps of their beaks to filter out the tiny fish and shrimps.

== In human culture ==
The Eurasian spoonbill appears in ancient Egyptian paintings and carvings from the Fifth Dynasty era. A small carved wooden figure of the bird was found in Amenhotep III's palace in Thebes perhaps as a toy.

== Conservation ==
Overall, the Eurasian spoonbill is not threatened and the total global population was estimated at 63–65,000 mature birds in 2015. In Europe, the population experienced a significant decrease between 1960 and 1990, but since then it has been increasing and was estimated to number c. 29,000 mature birds in 2020. For example, in the Netherlands, the population had reached a low point of less than 150 breeding pairs in 1968, but due to better habitat protection and bans of toxins like DDT it rapidly increased from the 1980s, reaching almost 3000 pairs by 2015. Up to the early 2000s, in Europe only the Netherlands, Spain, Austria, Hungary and Greece had sizeable breeding populations. The northernmost part of the Eurasian spoonbill's range is in Denmark where the first known breeding was in 1900. Through the 1900s, this breeding population was small and highly irregular, including long periods with none. The species became more thoroughly established in Denmark in 1996 (where a few birds, likely from the Netherlands, arrived and began breeding) and its population has since rapidly increased with multiple colonies; first passing 100 pairs in 2011, and with almost 600 pairs as of 2021. It is likely that this northward spread has been aided by increasing temperatures. In the United Kingdom, it was extirpated around 1668, although in the previous century it had been a widespread breeding species in southern England and Wales, even near London. There were breeding attempts again in the mid-1990s, with the first successful breeding in 1998. This culminated with the formation of a small colony of 6 breeding pairs at Holkham in Norfolk in 2010. In 2011, 8 breeding pairs nested, successfully fledging 14 young, and in 2018 the colony had increased to 28 breeding pairs.

Threats to the Eurasian spoonbill include habitat loss and degradation by drainage and pollution, it is especially adversely affected by the disappearance of reed swamps. In Greece disturbance from fishing once caused the population to decline, and human exploitation of eggs and nestlings for food has threatened the species in the past. Breeding colonies are highly vulnerable to general disturbances and predators like red fox. Consequently, colonies are often restricted to islands free of ground predators; however, in some places, pairs in mainland colonies may breed successfully by nesting off the ground in trees and bushes.

The research network Eurasian Spoonbill International Expert Group was formed in 1991. It made an action plan for the bird in 2008. In 2013 the group joined the Agreement on the Conservation of African-Eurasian Migratory Waterbirds.

== Gallery ==
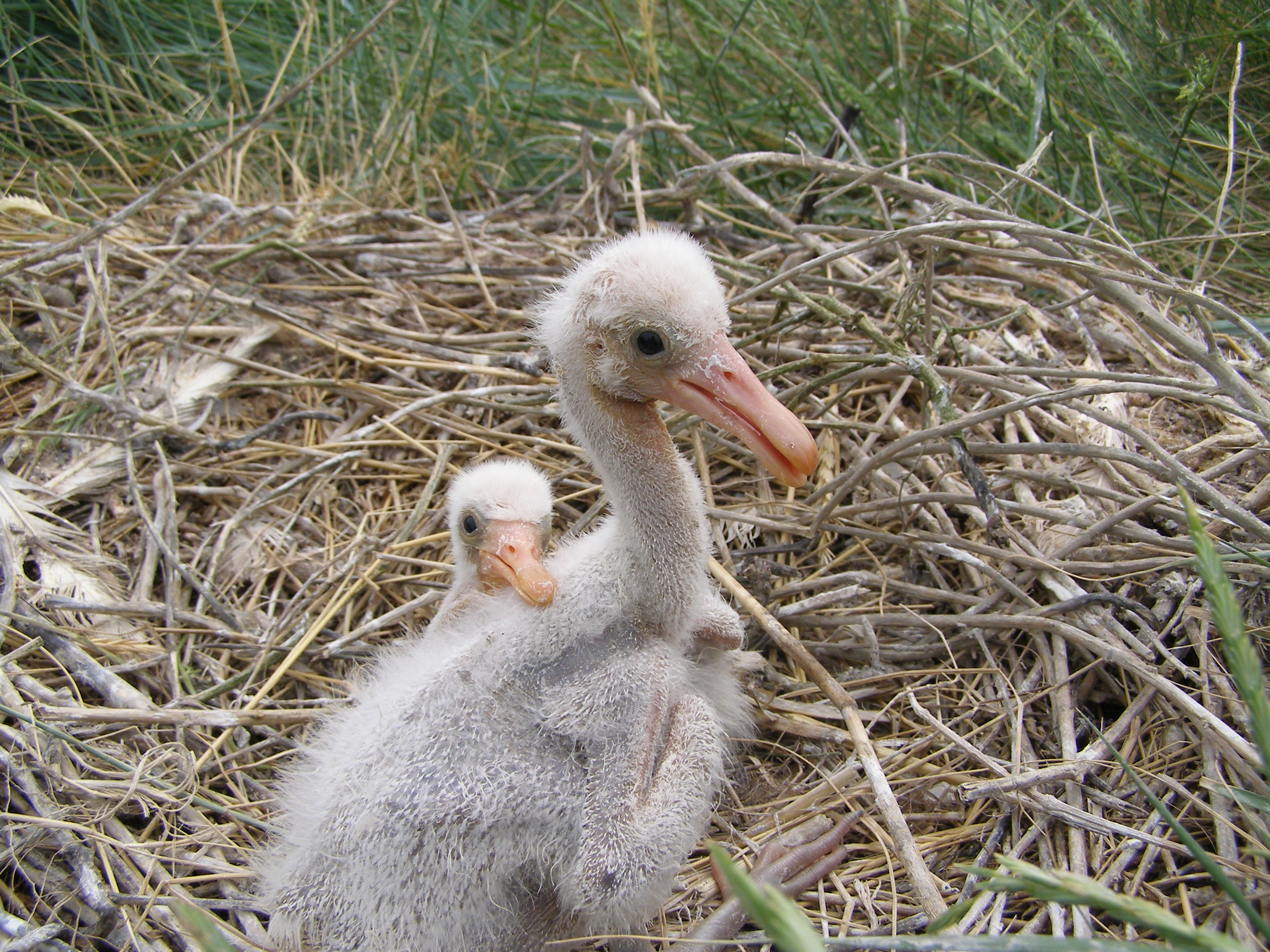
Nestlings

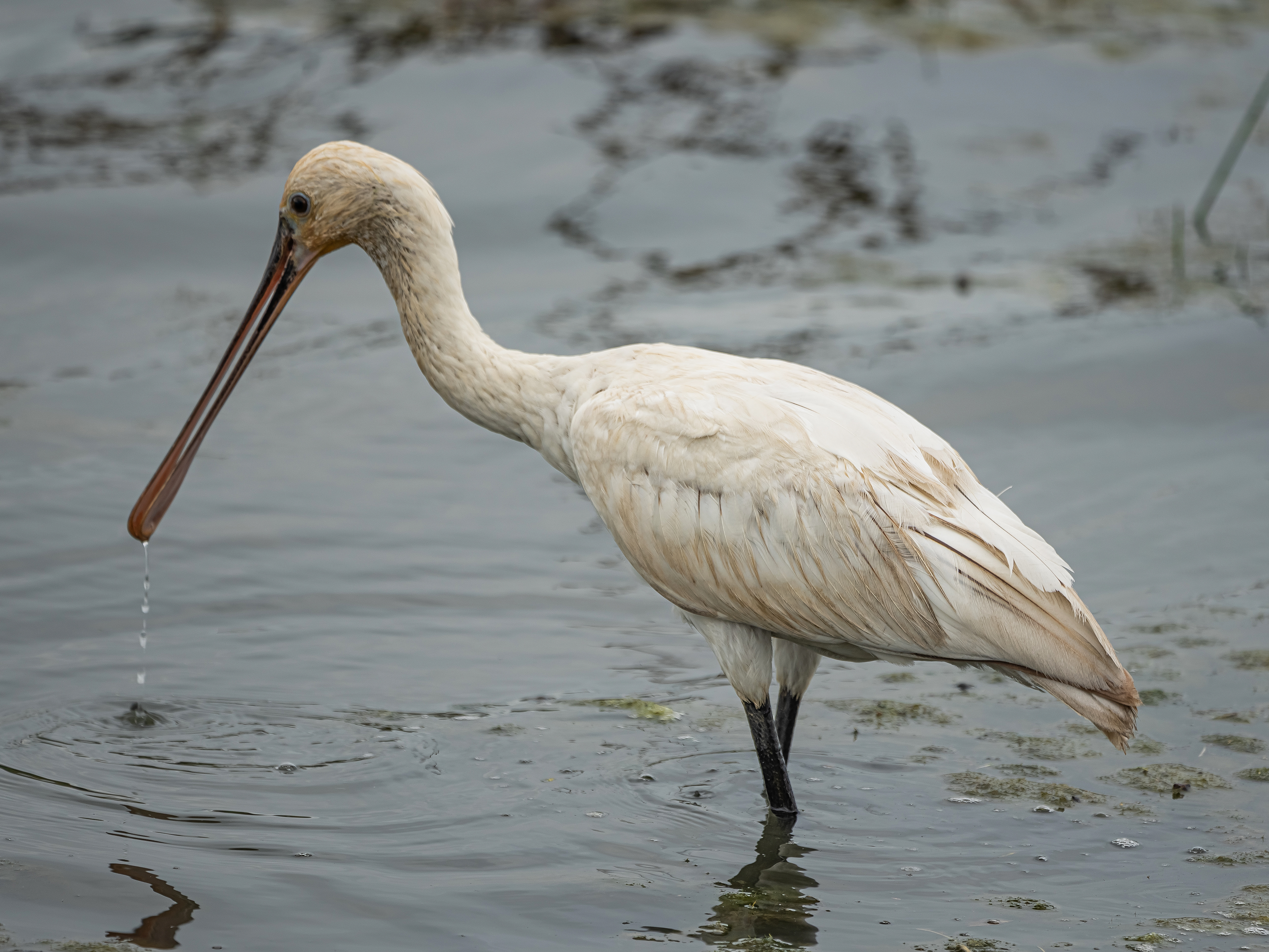
Immature Eurasian spoonbill, Bundala National Park

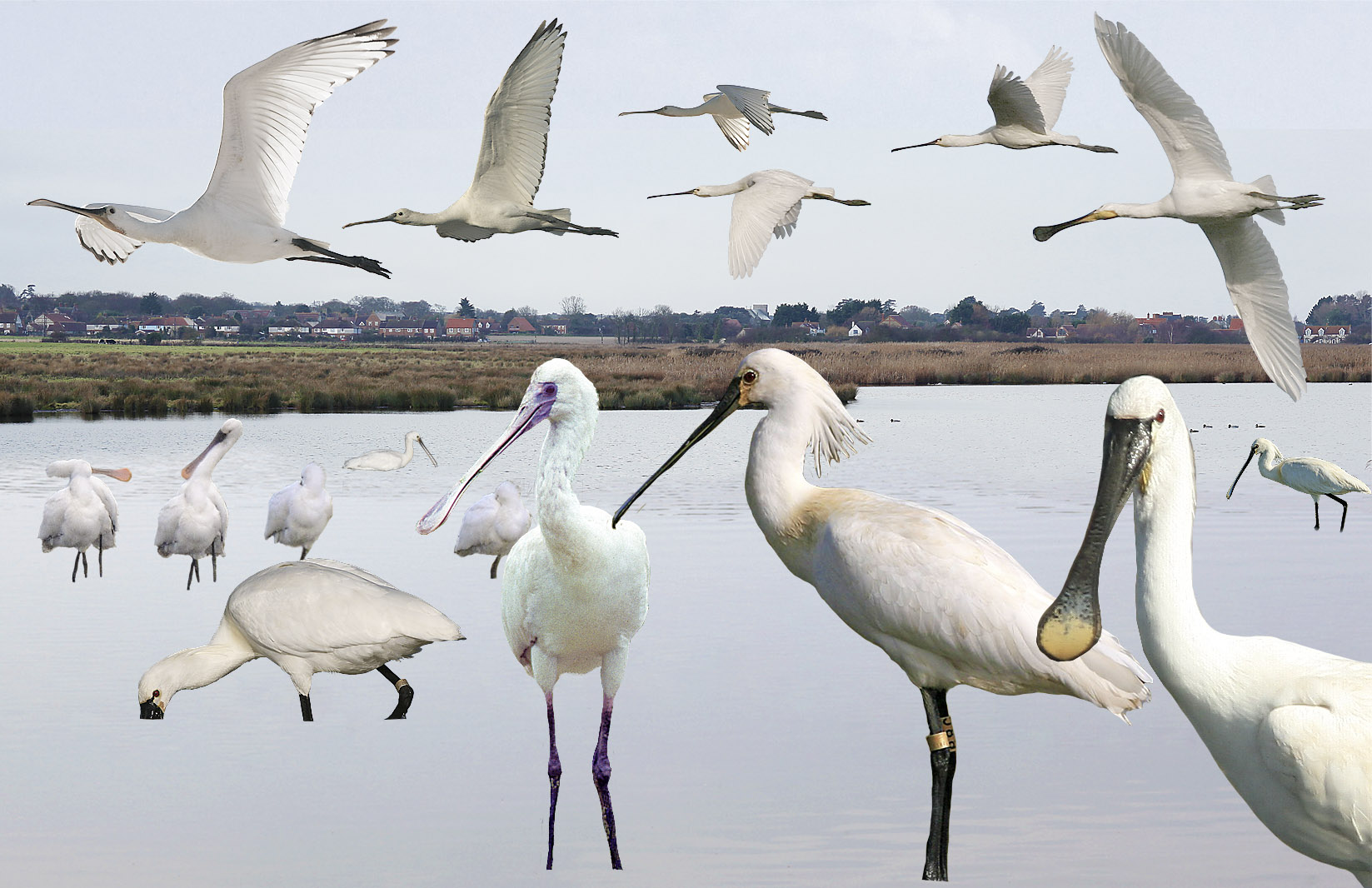
ID composite

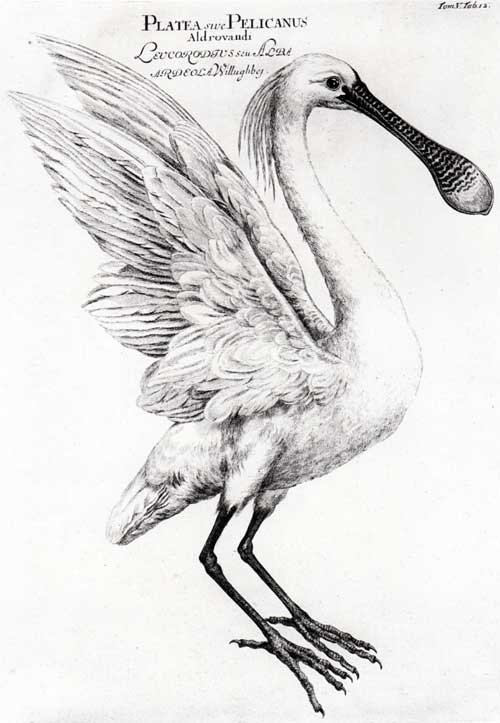
1726 drawing by Jacobus Houbraken

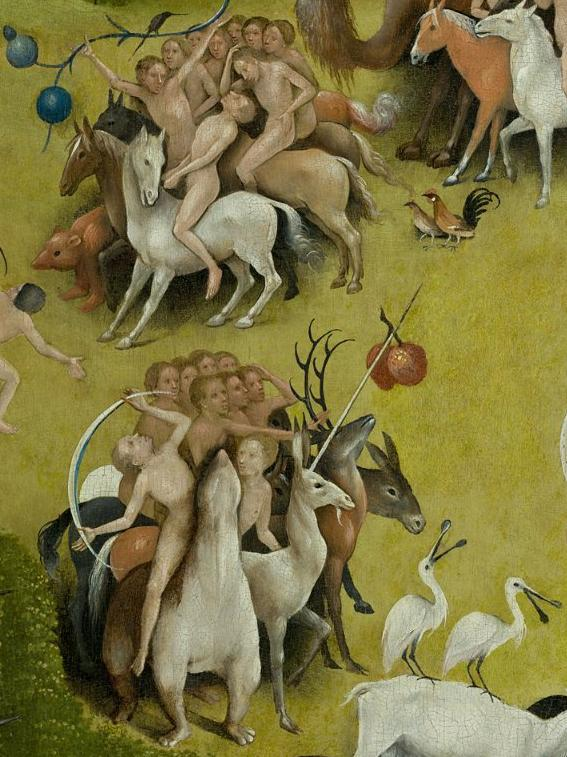
Hieronymus Bosch: The Garden of Earthly Delights, 15th century

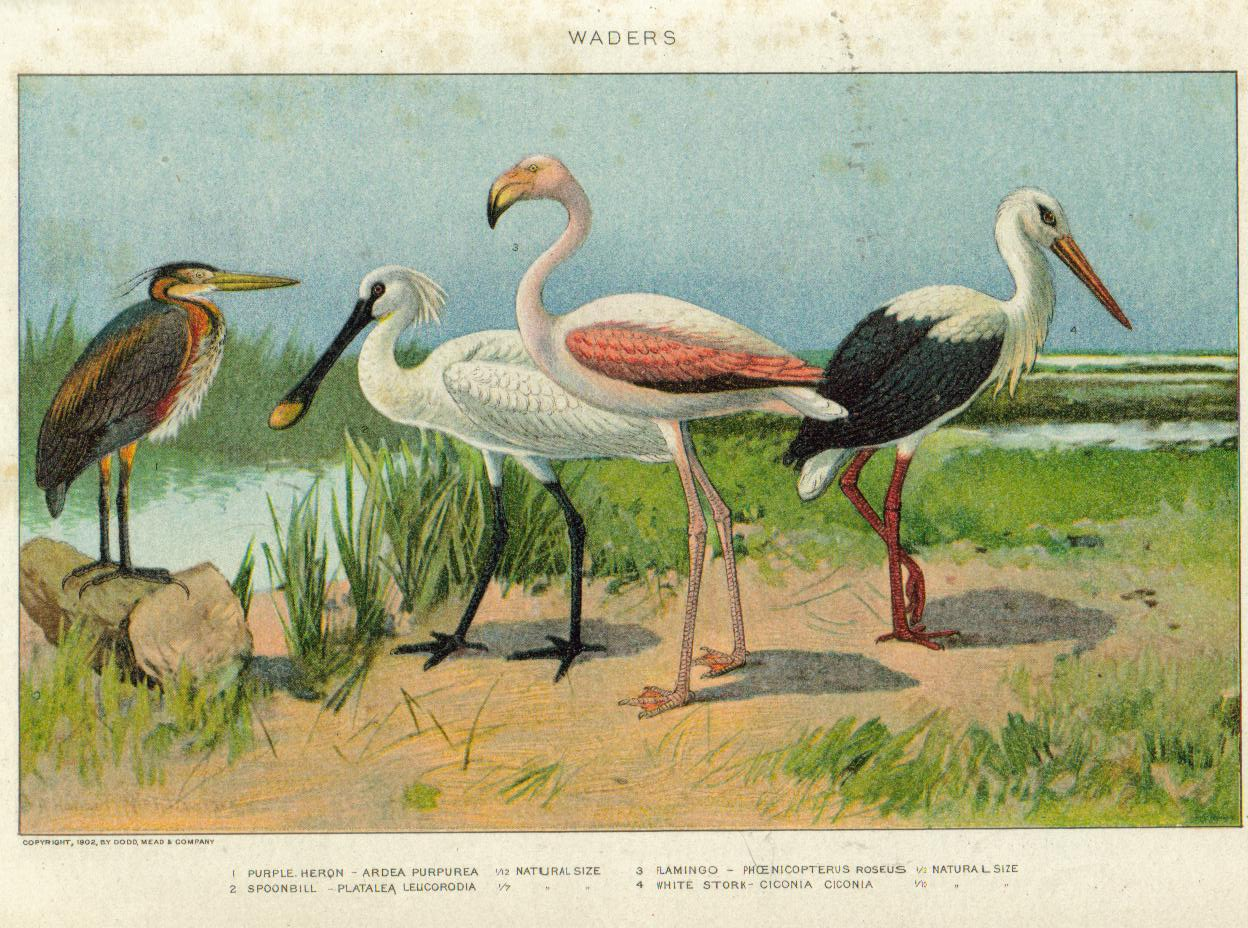
New International Encyclopedia, 1902
