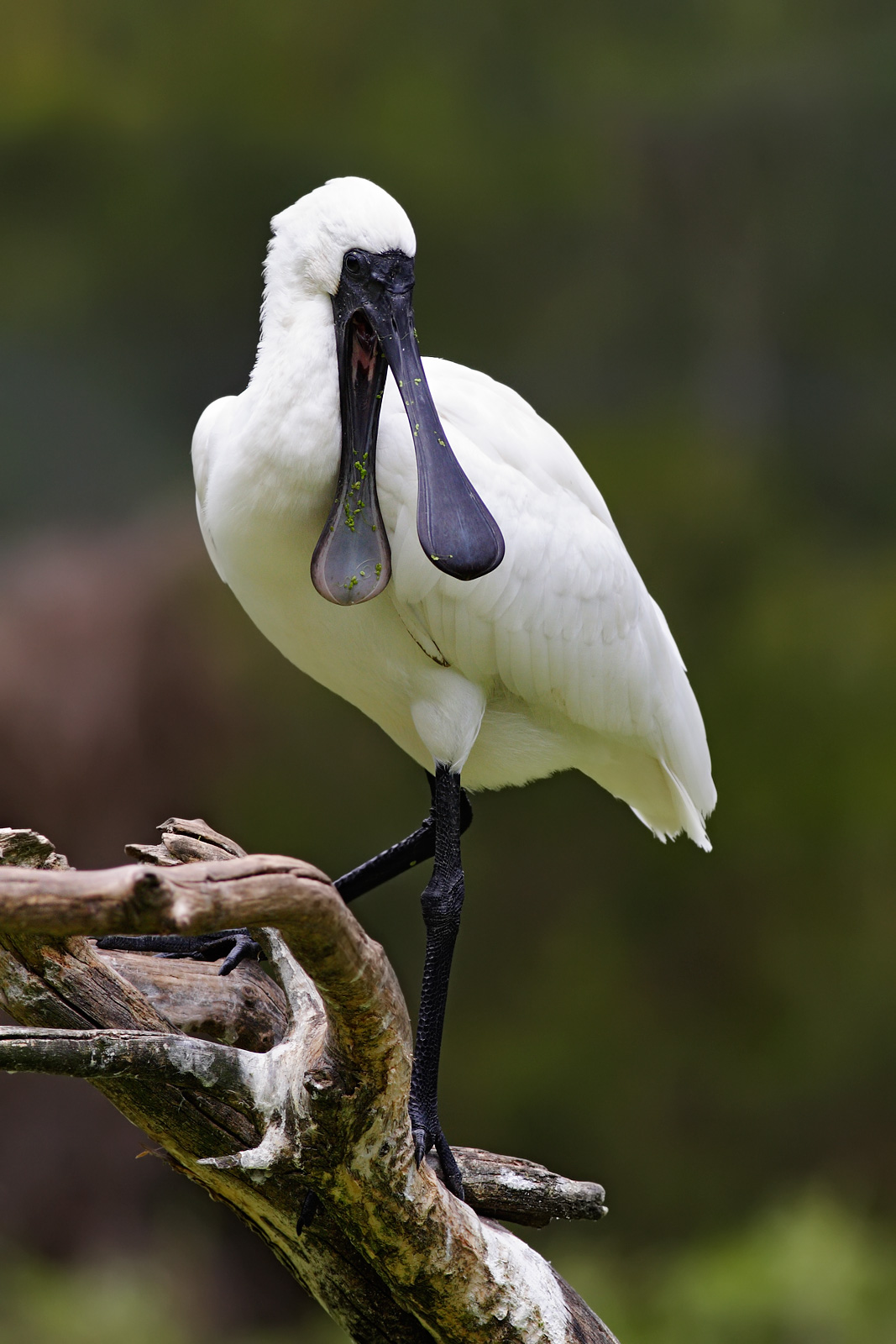
- Royal spoonbill with open beak

Conservation status
- Least Concern (IUCN 3.1)

Scientific classification
- Kingdom: Animalia
- Phylum: Chordata
- Class: Aves
- Order: Pelecaniformes
- Family: Threskiornithidae
- Genus: Platalea
- Species: P. regia

Binomial name
- Platalea regia Gould, 1838

= Royal spoonbill =

Species of bird

The royal spoonbill (Platalea regia), also known as the black-billed spoonbill lives in intertidal flats and shallows of fresh and saltwater wetlands in Australia, New Zealand, Indonesia, Papua New Guinea, and the Solomon Islands. (In New Zealand, it is also known by the Māori name kōtuku ngutupapa.) It has also been recorded as a vagrant in New Caledonia. It is one of 6 spoonbill species world wide. The royal spoonbill lives in wetlands and feeds on crustaceans, fish and small insects by sweeping its bill from side to side. It always flies with its head extended. Widespread throughout its large range, the royal spoonbill is evaluated as Least Concern on the IUCN Red List of Threatened Species.

== Taxonomy ==
The renowned ornithologist John Gould first described the royal spoonbill in 1838, naming it Platalea regia and noting its similarity to the Eurasian spoonbill (P. leucorodia). A 2010 study of mitochondrial DNA of the spoonbills by Chesser and colleagues found that the royal and black-faced spoonbills were each other's closest relatives.

== Description ==
The royal spoonbill is a large, white bird with a black, spoon-shaped bill. It is approximately 80 cm (31 in) tall, 74–81 cm (29–32 in) and a weight of 1.4–2.07 kg (3.1–4.6 lb). It is a wading bird and has long legs for walking through water. It eats fish, shellfish, crabs and amphibians, catching its prey by making a side-to-side movement with its bill.

The end of the bill of the royal spoonbill is broader and works more like a pair of tongs than the narrower bill of the yellow-billed spoonbill, which acts like a forceps.

== Feeding ==
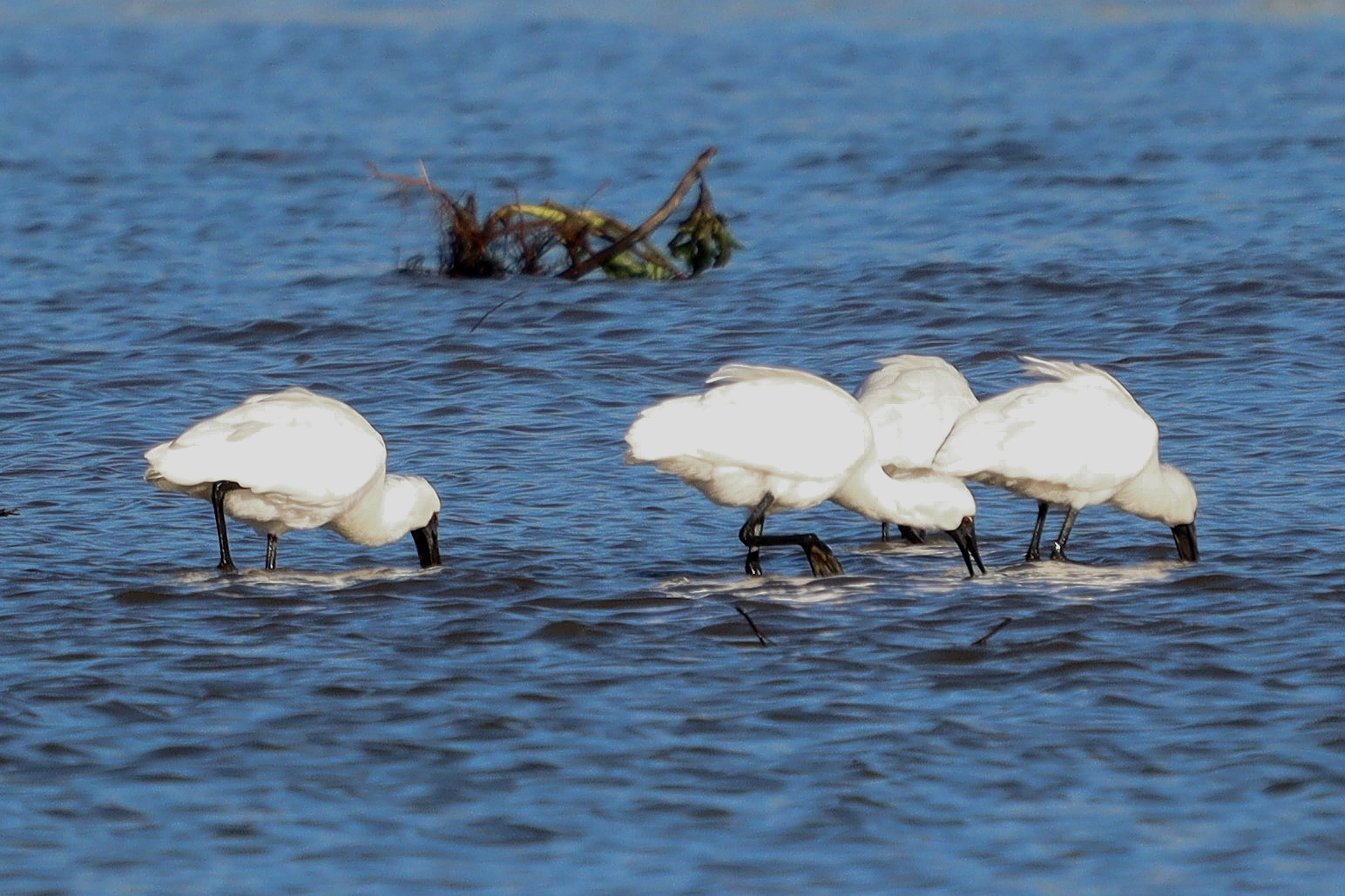
Spoonbills feeding at Pauatahanui inlet, New Zealand

The royal spoonbill is carnivorous, catching small animals by sweeping its bill through shallow water and swallowing prey once detected. When slow sweeping, the spoonbill walks slowly with the bill perpendicular to the water surface (i.e. vertical) with the bill tip open about 2 to 4 cm (1 to 1.5 in), sweeping an arc of around 100 degrees in front of the bird. The bird walks slowly, kicking up debris and small animals from the bottom of the body of water, which it senses and catches with its bill. When an item is sensed, the spoonbill switches to intensive sweeping of a small area. Royal spoonbills also probe submerged plants directly for prey, and seize prey such as spiders above ground. They have also been observed dragging their bills through shallow water alongside them while walking.

Prey items recorded at Lake Cowal include freshwater crustaceans such as the common yabby (Cherax destructor), shrimp of the genus Macrobrachium and family Atyidae, insects, particularly aquatic bugs of the families Notonectidae and Corixidae, fish such as mosquitofish (Gambusia affinis) and goldfish (Carassius auratus), and occasionally freshwater snails and plant material such as medic burr (Medicago polymorpha).

== Breeding ==
When they are breeding, long white plumes grow from the back of their heads and coloured patches appear on the face. The nest is an open platform of sticks in a tree in which the female lays two or three eggs. The chicks hatch after 21 days. The birds are highly sensitive to disturbance in the breeding season. In Australia, whole colonies have been known to desert their eggs after a minor upset.

== Gallery ==
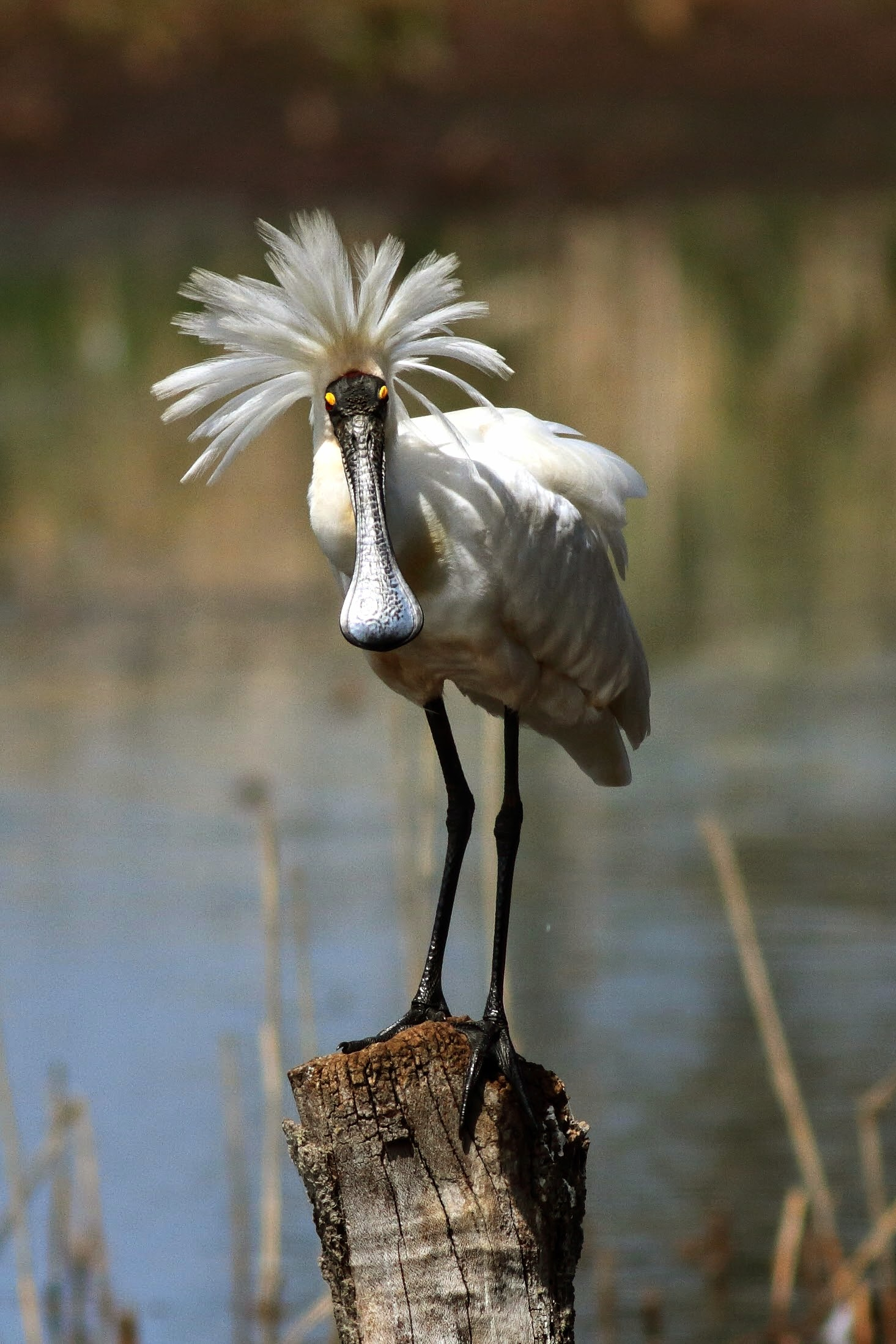

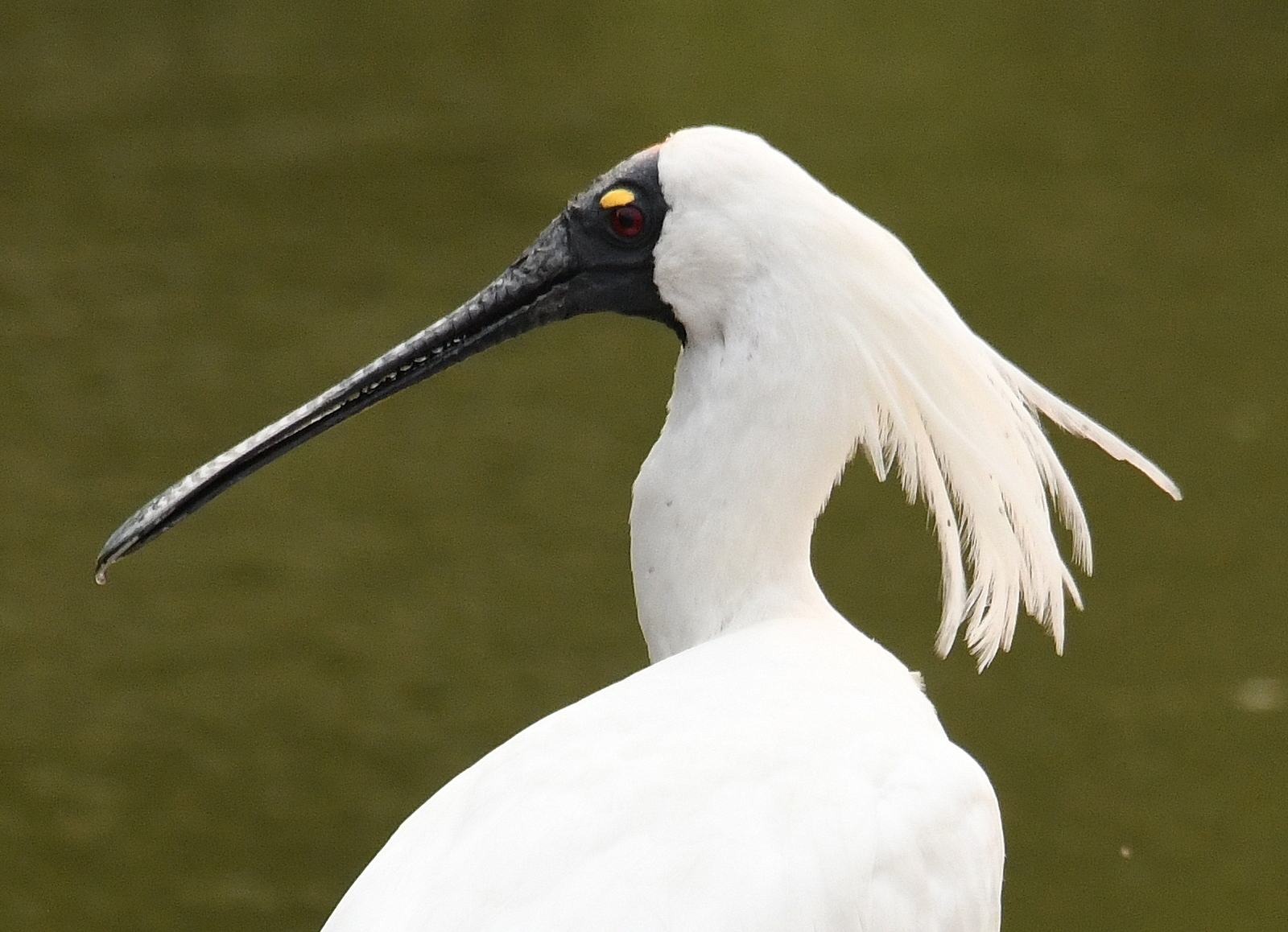

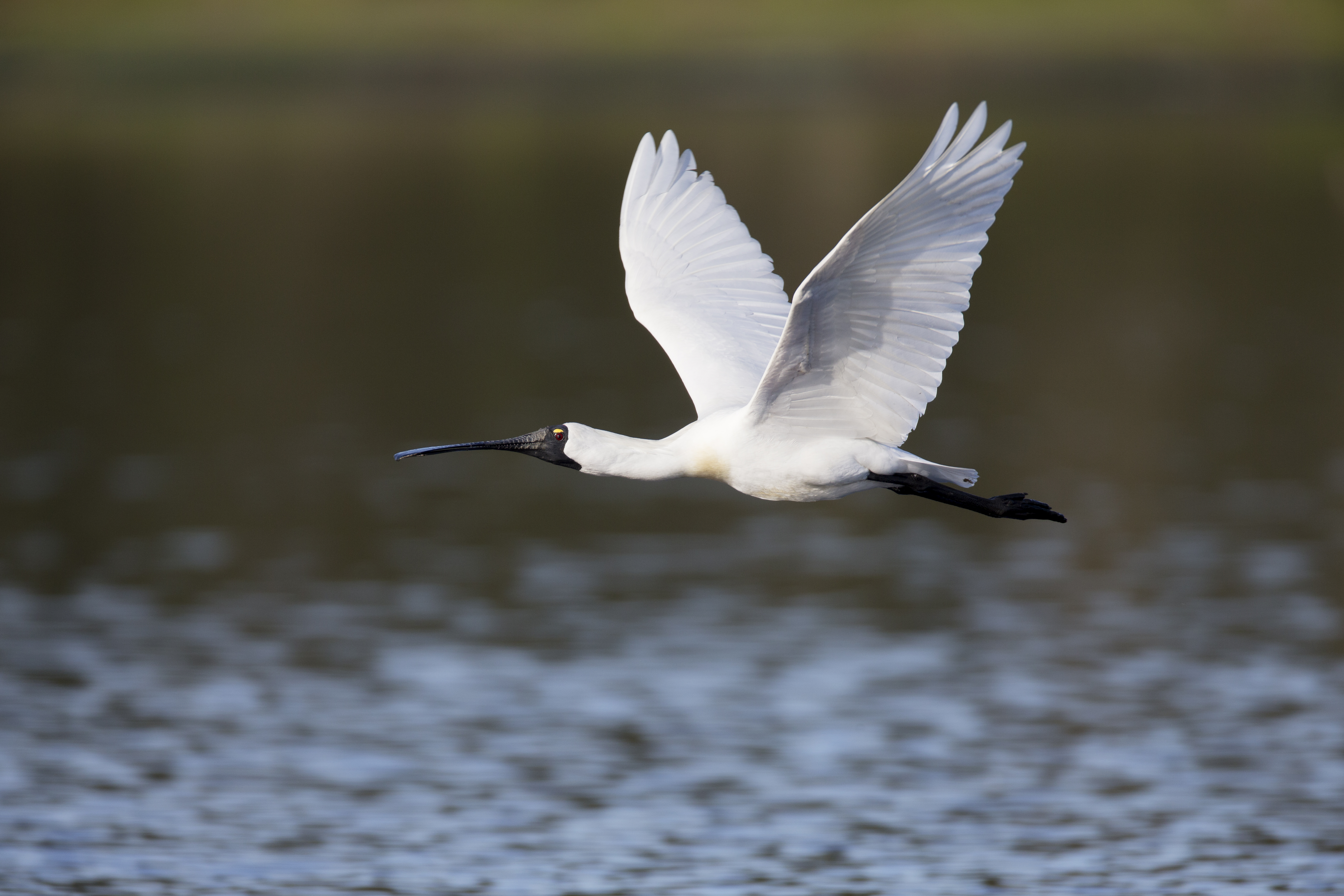

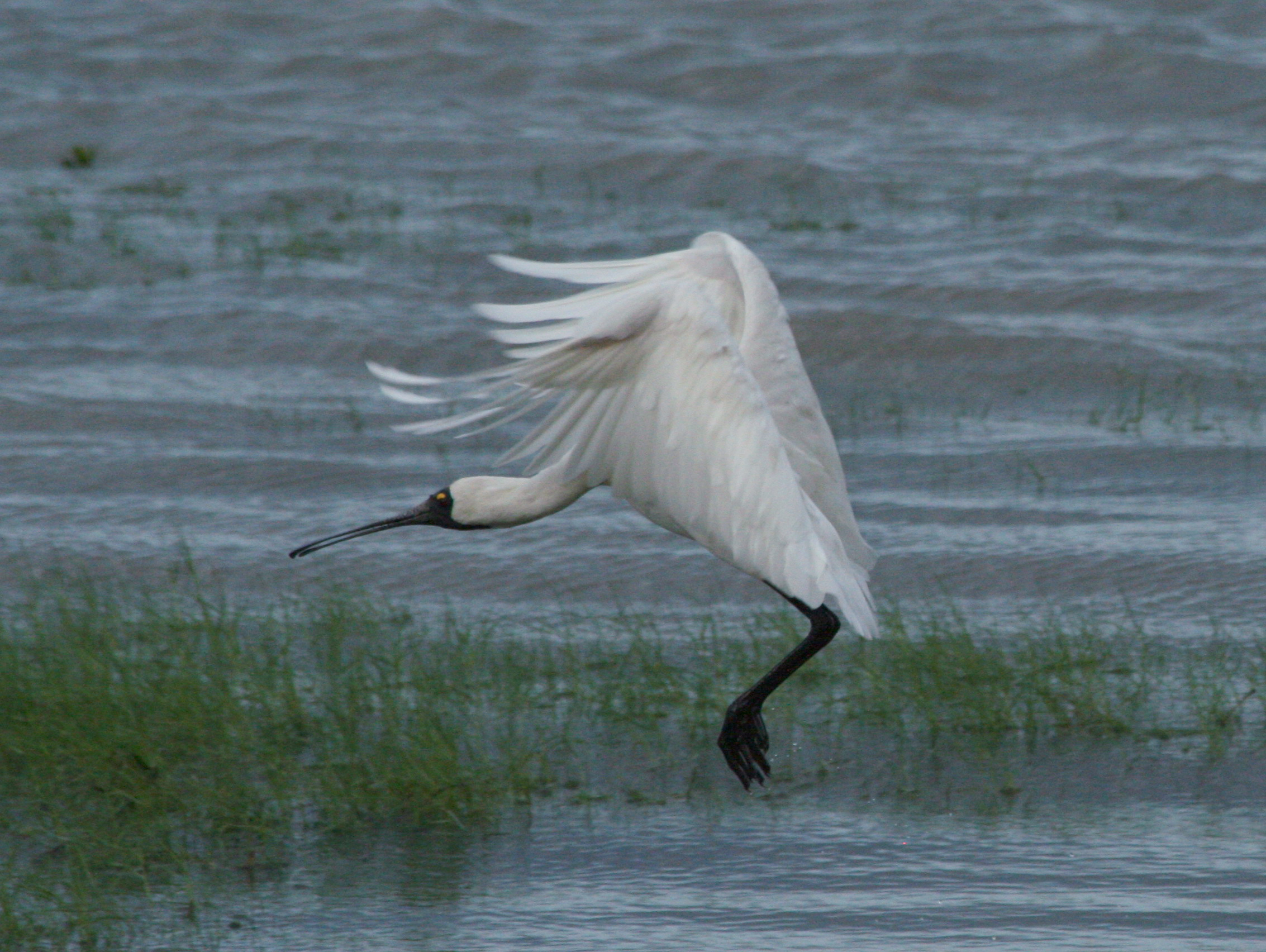

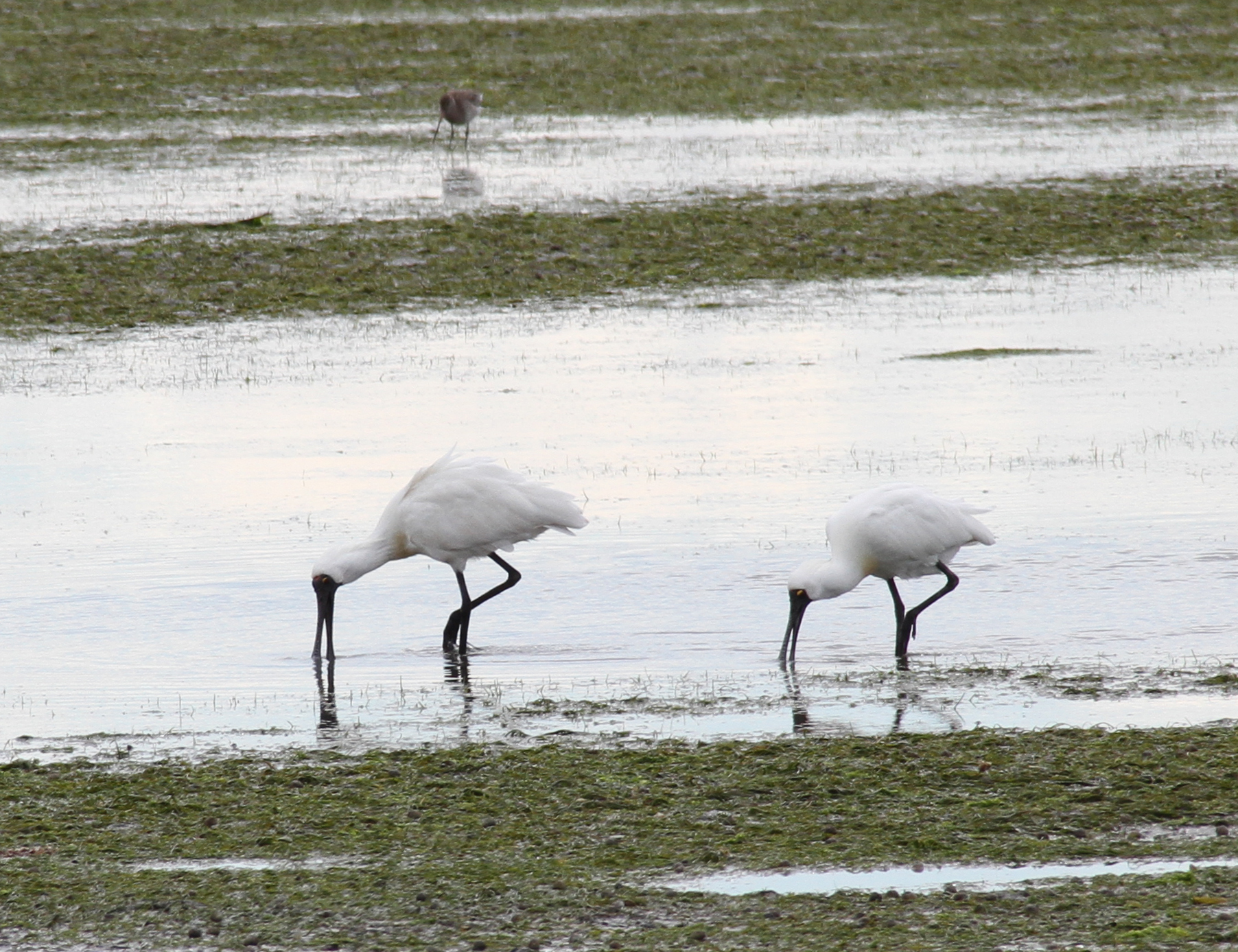

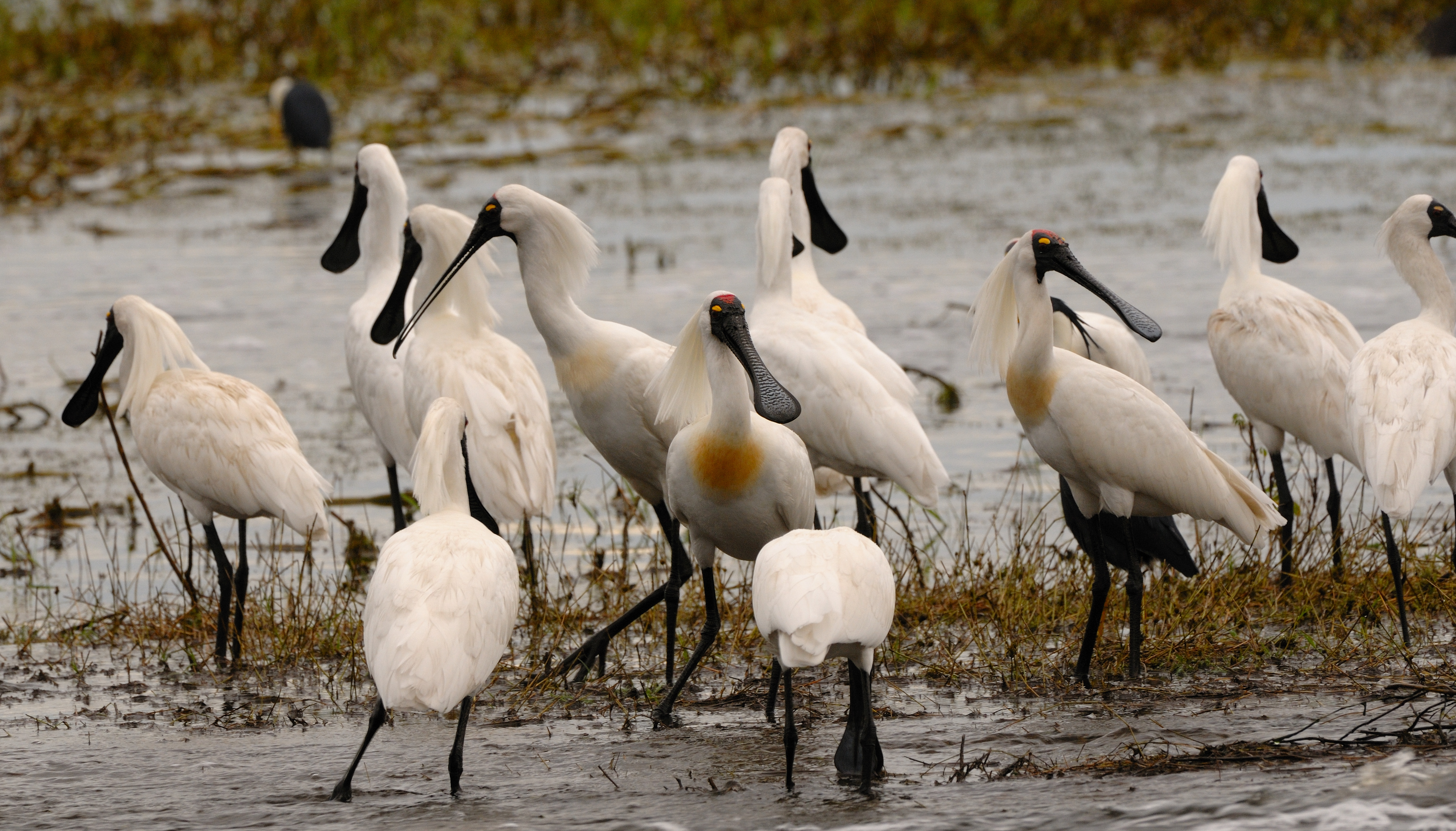

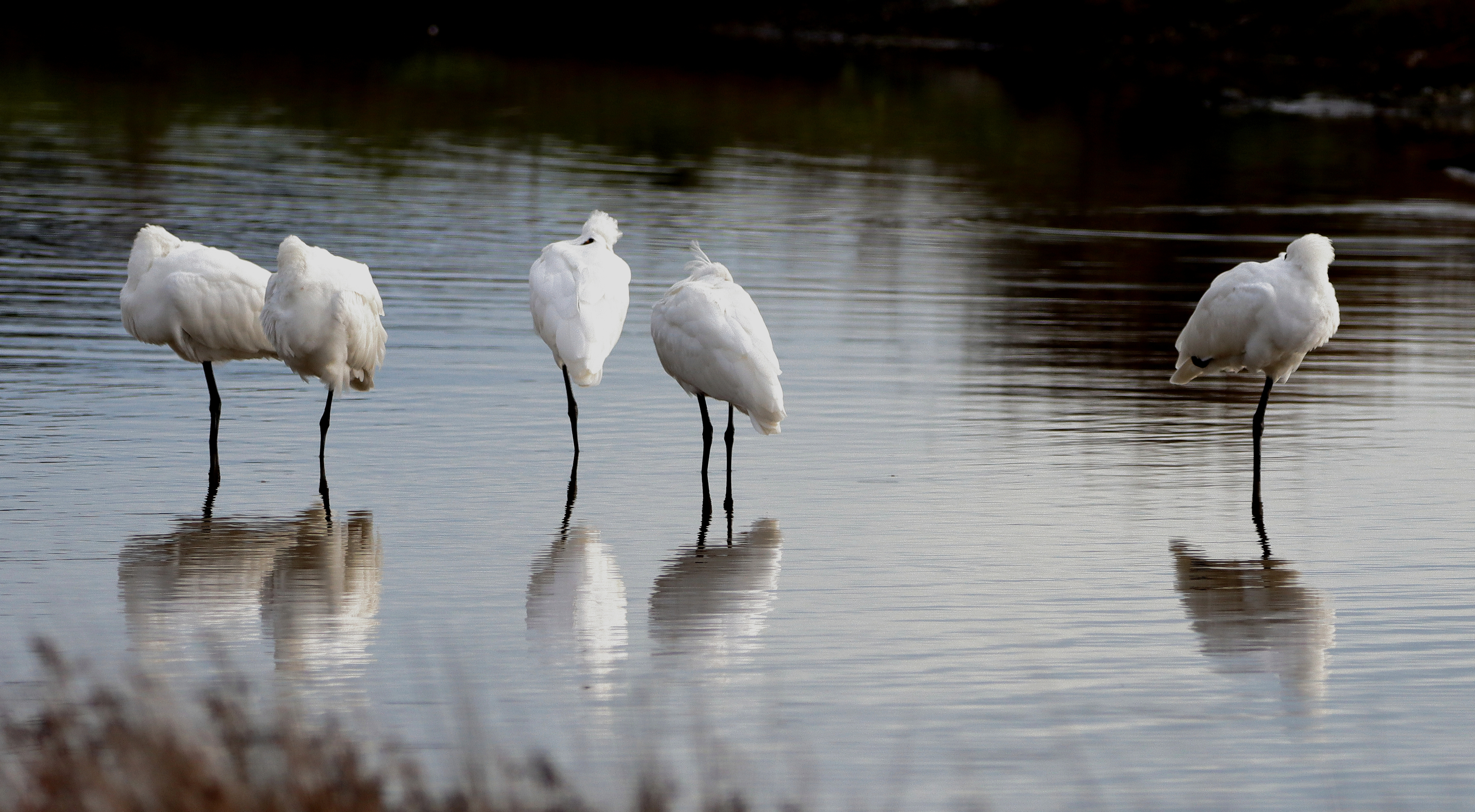

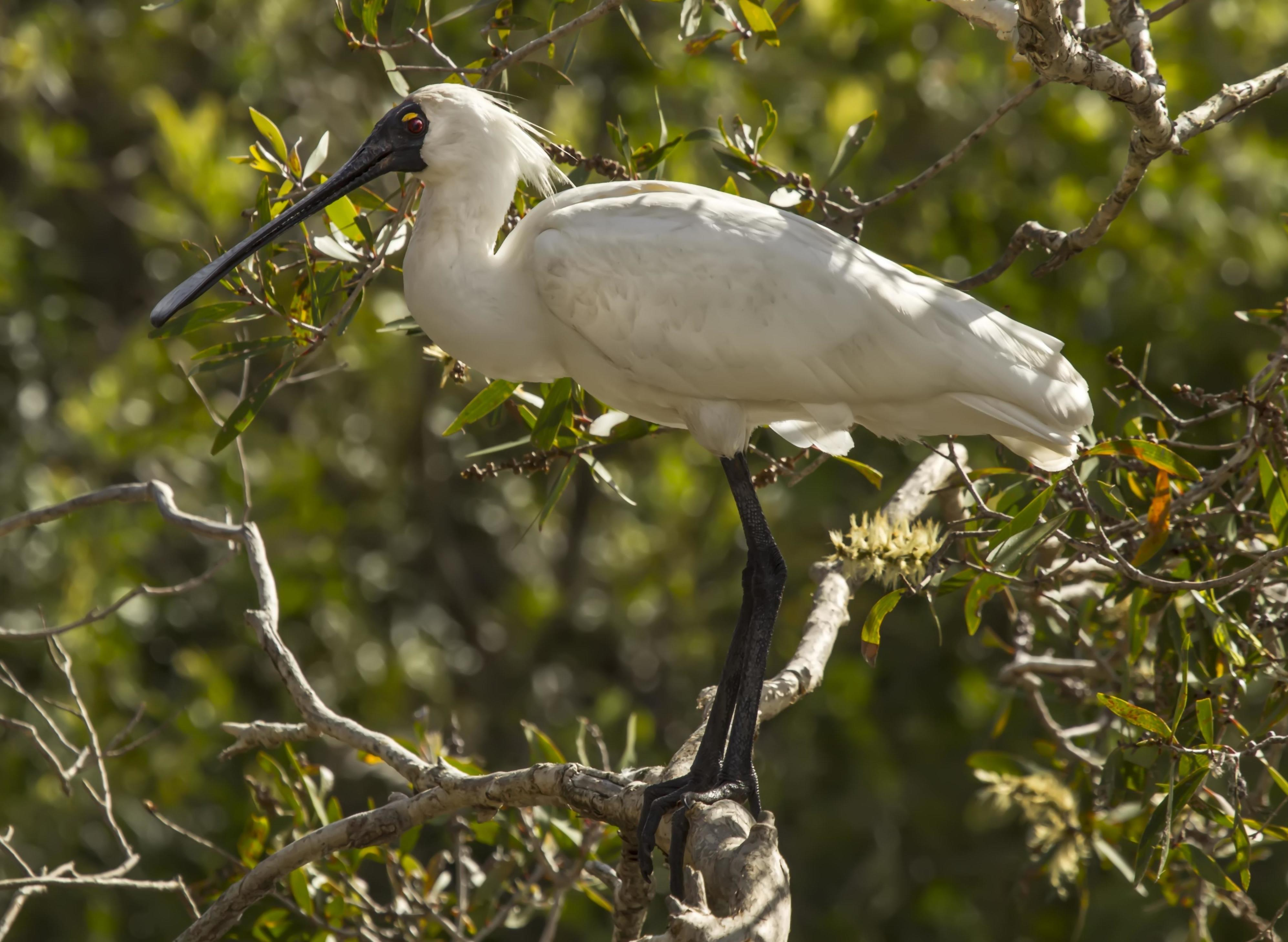

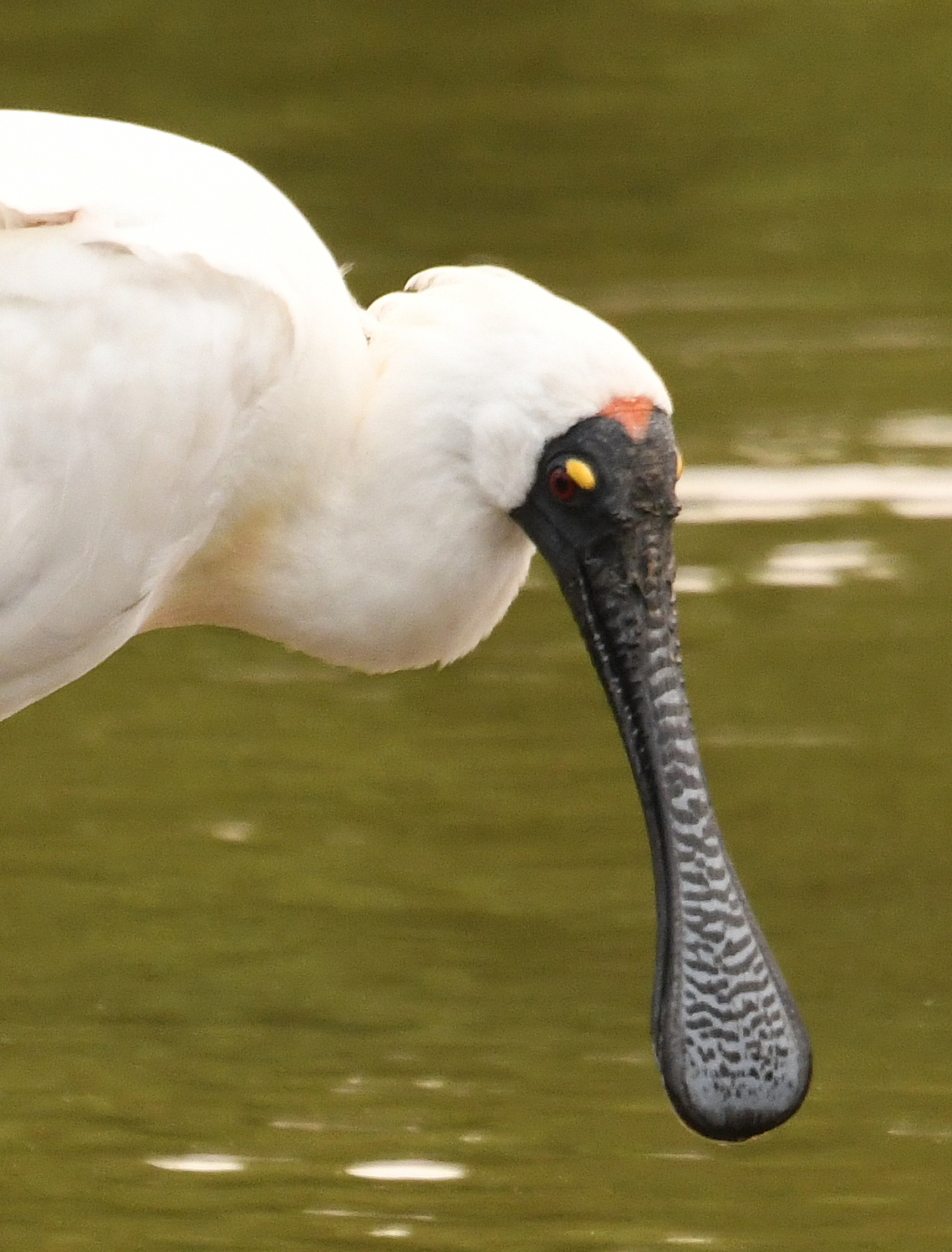
