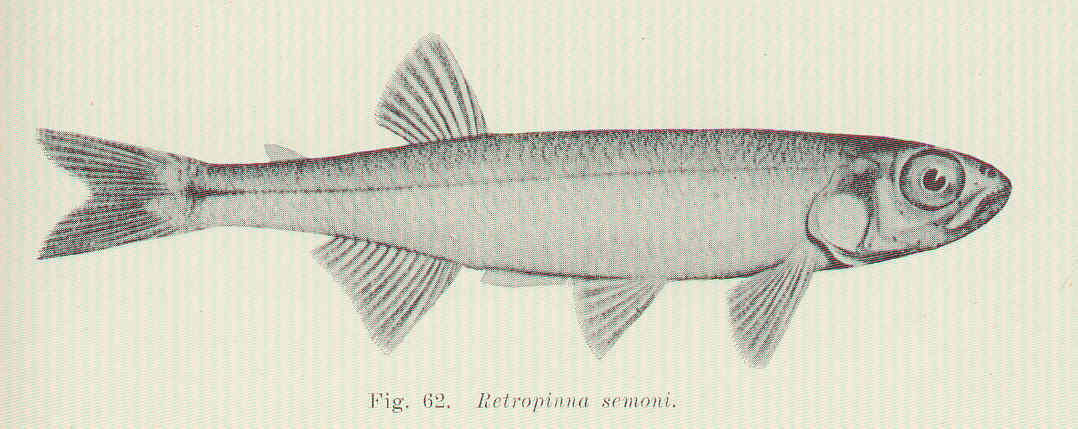

Conservation status
- Least Concern (IUCN 3.1)

Scientific classification
- Kingdom: Animalia
- Phylum: Chordata
- Class: Actinopterygii
- Order: Osmeriformes
- Family: Retropinnidae
- Genus: Retropinna
- Species: R. semoni

Binomial name
- Retropinna semoni (M. C. W. Weber, 1895)

= Australian smelt =

Species of fish

The Australian smelt (Retropinna semoni) is a small, pelagic silvery freshwater fish found in large numbers in waters of the south eastern Australian mainland.

== Distribution ==
The fish is endemic to Australia and widely distributed through the coastal drainages of the south eastern part of the mainland. The species is found in coastal drainages from the south east corner of South Australia through Victoria, New South Wales to the Fitzroy River in south east Queensland. It occurs widely in the Murray River and its tributaries and up the Darling as far upstream as Wilcannia. There are isolated populations in the Coopers Creek which drains into Lake Eyre and several smaller ones in north-western New South Wales and southern Queensland. Recent genetic research indicates Australian smelt stocks are composed of 5 highly genetically distinct and as yet undescribed species (Hammer et al., 2007).

== Description ==
A small silvery fish to 75 mm total length, very occasionally to 100 mm. In Coopers Creek usually only to 50 mm. It is clear to purple-olive on the back, translucent with a silver streak along the sides, sometimes with orange highlights, and has colourless fins. Captively raised specimens will easily exceed 100mm and live for longer periods than their wild counterparts.

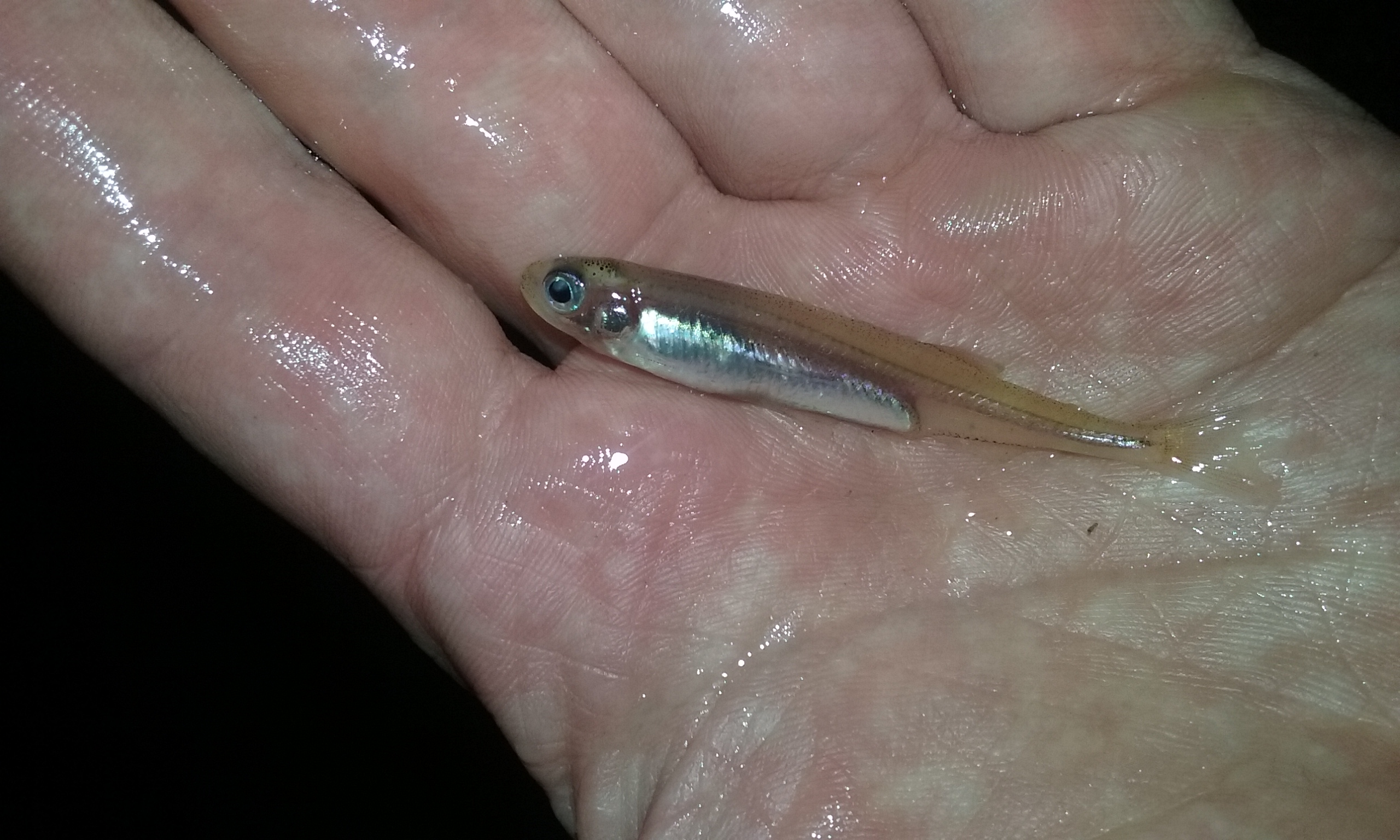
An Australian smelt captured at night by torchlight with a dip-net, in the upper Murrumbidgee River.

== Habitat ==
Often found in large schools of thousands, this pelagic species prefers slow moving or still waters. It is often found in billabongs, dams and lakes at various salinity levels and in the lower reaches of rivers and streams. Although there have been some reports of diadromous populations, this fish usually completes its entire life cycle in freshwater. They shoal near the surface and around the cover of aquatic plants and woody debris.

== Diet ==
A carnivorous fish, the Australian smelt feeds mostly on small invertebrates such as aquatic insects and microcrustaceans, and a variety of planktonic organisms.

== Reproduction ==
Spawns in spring at water temperatures in excess of 15 °C. Eggs are demersal, adhesive, spherical and transparent, about 0.8 mm diameter to 1 mm when water hardened. Eggs fall to the bottom and stick to instream debris, vegetation and the substrate. Females lay between 100 and 1000 eggs. Hatching occurs at about 9 to 10 days and larvae are around 4.5 to 5 mm total length.

== Importance to humans ==
This species has some potential as an aquarium species. Ideally suited to use as an effective mosquito predator in ponds in south eastern Australia, especially where frogs are encountered. Not suitable for use in a community tank, best kept as a school of fish in a single species situation.
