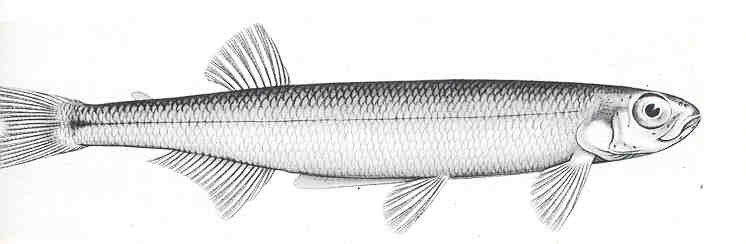

Scientific classification
- Domain: Eukaryota
- Kingdom: Animalia
- Phylum: Chordata
- Class: Actinopterygii
- Order: Osmeriformes
- Family: Retropinnidae
- Genus: Retropinna
- Species: R. tasmanica

Binomial name
- Retropinna tasmanica McCulloch, 1920

= Tasmanian smelt =

Species of fish

The Tasmanian smelt (Retropinna tasmanica) is a small, pelagic freshwater smelt found in lowland streams of Tasmania, Australia.
