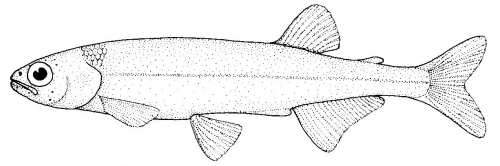

Scientific classification
- Kingdom: Animalia
- Phylum: Chordata
- Class: Actinopterygii
- Order: Osmeriformes
- Family: Retropinnidae
- Genus: Retropinna; T. N. Gill, 1862

= Retropinna =

Genus of fishes

Retropinna is a genus in the family Retropinnidae containing one species that is widespread in southeastern Australia, one from Tasmania and one from New Zealand.

== Species ==
There are currently three recognized species in this genus:

- Retropinna retropinna (J. Richardson, 1848) (Cucumberfish, New Zealand smelt)
- Retropinna semoni (M. C. W. Weber, 1895) (Australian smelt)
- Retropinna tasmanica McCulloch, 1920 (Tasmanian smelt)
