= Whitebait =

Collective term for the immature fry of fish

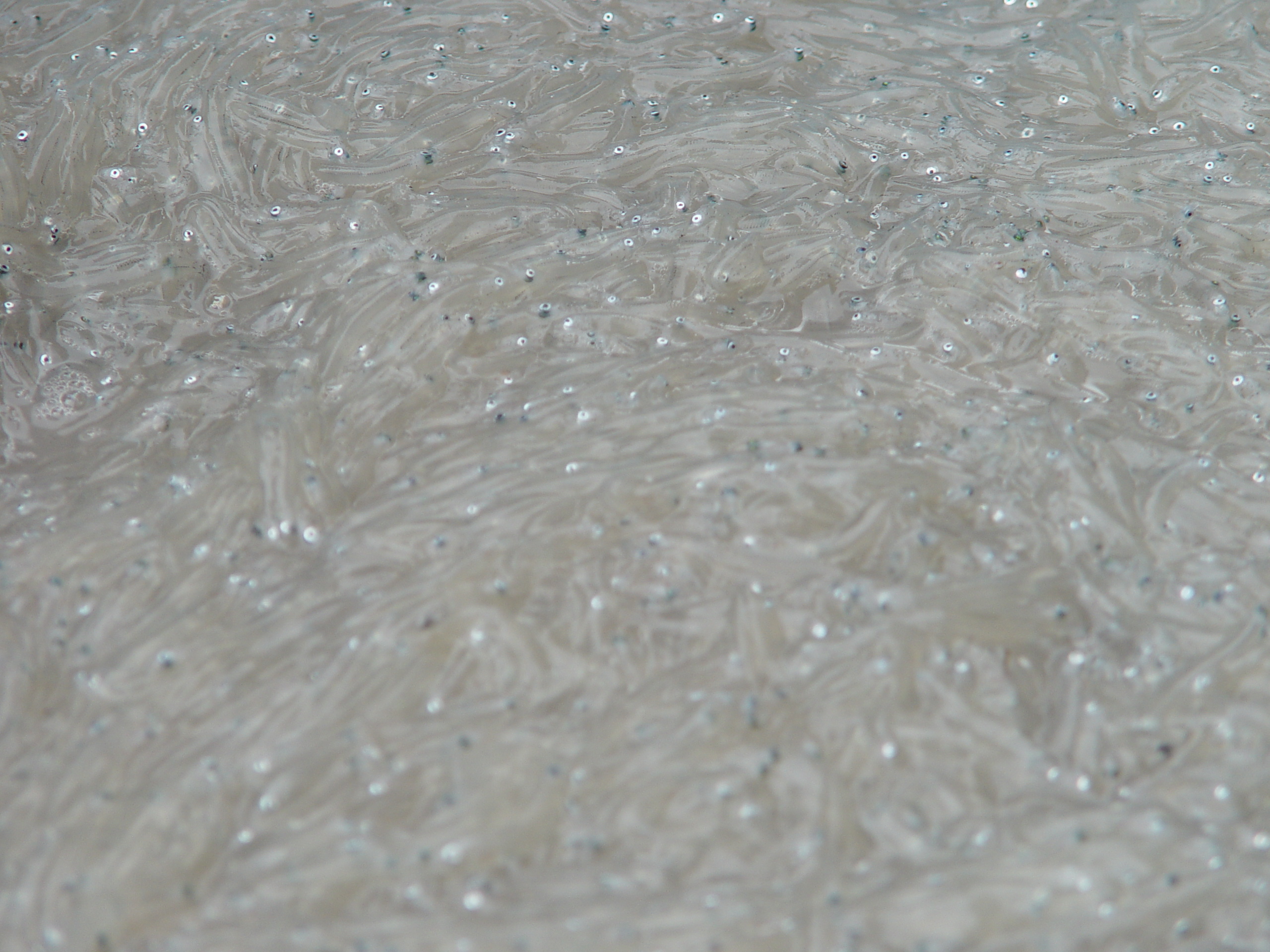
Whitebait is the immature fry of fish, in this case of sardines and anchovies caught on the French Riviera

Whitebait is a collective term for the immature fry of fish, typically between 25 and 50 millimetres (1 and 2 in) long. Such young fish often travel together in schools along coasts, and move into estuaries and sometimes up rivers where they can be easily caught using fine-meshed fishing nets. Whitebaiting is the activity of catching whitebait.

Individual whitebait are tender and edible. The entire fish is eaten — including head, fins, bones, and bowels. Some species make better eating than others, and the particular species that are marketed as "whitebait" vary in different parts of the world.

As whitebait consists of immature fry of many important food species (such as herring, sprat, sardines, mackerel, bass and many others) it is not an ecologically viable foodstuff and several countries impose strict controls on harvesting.

== Whitebait by region ==
=== Alboran Sea ===
The Alboran Sea is the westernmost element of the Mediterranean Sea. Whitebait have been consumed as a favoured element of the diet of peoples living along the northern coasts of the Alboran Sea in Spain, even though sale of these products has been banned.

=== Australia ===
In Australia whitebait refers to the juvenile stage of several predominantly galaxias species during their return to freshwater from the marine phase of their lifecycle.

Species referred to as whitebait in Australia include common galaxias G. maculatus, climbing galaxias G. brevipinnis, spotted galaxias G. truttaceus, Tasmanian whitebait Lovettia sealii, Tasmanian mudfish Neochanna cleaveri, and Tasmanian smelt Retropinna tasmanica.

Whitebait were once subject to a substantial commercial fishery but today only recreational fishers are permitted to gather them, under strict conditions and for a limited season.

=== China ===
Chinese whitebait is raised in fish farms and plentiful quantities are produced for export. The frozen product is commonly available in food stores and supermarkets at reasonable prices. The Chinese name for these is often translated as "silver fish" in English.

=== Italy ===
Gianchetti (also bianchetti) are the whitebait of the pesce azzurro of the Mediterranean (sardines and anchovies, etc.), caught with special nets named from the Ligurian sciabegottu (similar to the net to sciabica, but with smaller dimensions) in the early months of the year.

A speciality of the Liguria cuisine, gianchetti are generally lightly boiled in salted water and served hot, dressed with oil and lemon juice. Another classic approach is to make fritters of the fish together with an egg and flour batter; finally they may simply be dipped in flour and deep-fried (frittelle di gianchetti/bianchetti). The gianchetti of a red colour (ruscetti, rossetti) are tougher and scaly to the palate; they are largely used to flavour fish-based sauces.

In Sicilian cuisine whitebait are known as ceruses (literally translated as "baby"). Whitebait are the principal ingredient of the Sicilian specialty croquette polpette di neonata; which are a type of rolled meatball of whitebait with parsley, and egg and/or a bit of flour to amalgamate, fried in olive oil or sometimes deep-fried in peanut oil.

In Neapolitan cuisine whitebait are known as cicenielli.

In Brindisian cuisine whitebait are known as chuma (literally "foam of sea").

=== Japan ===
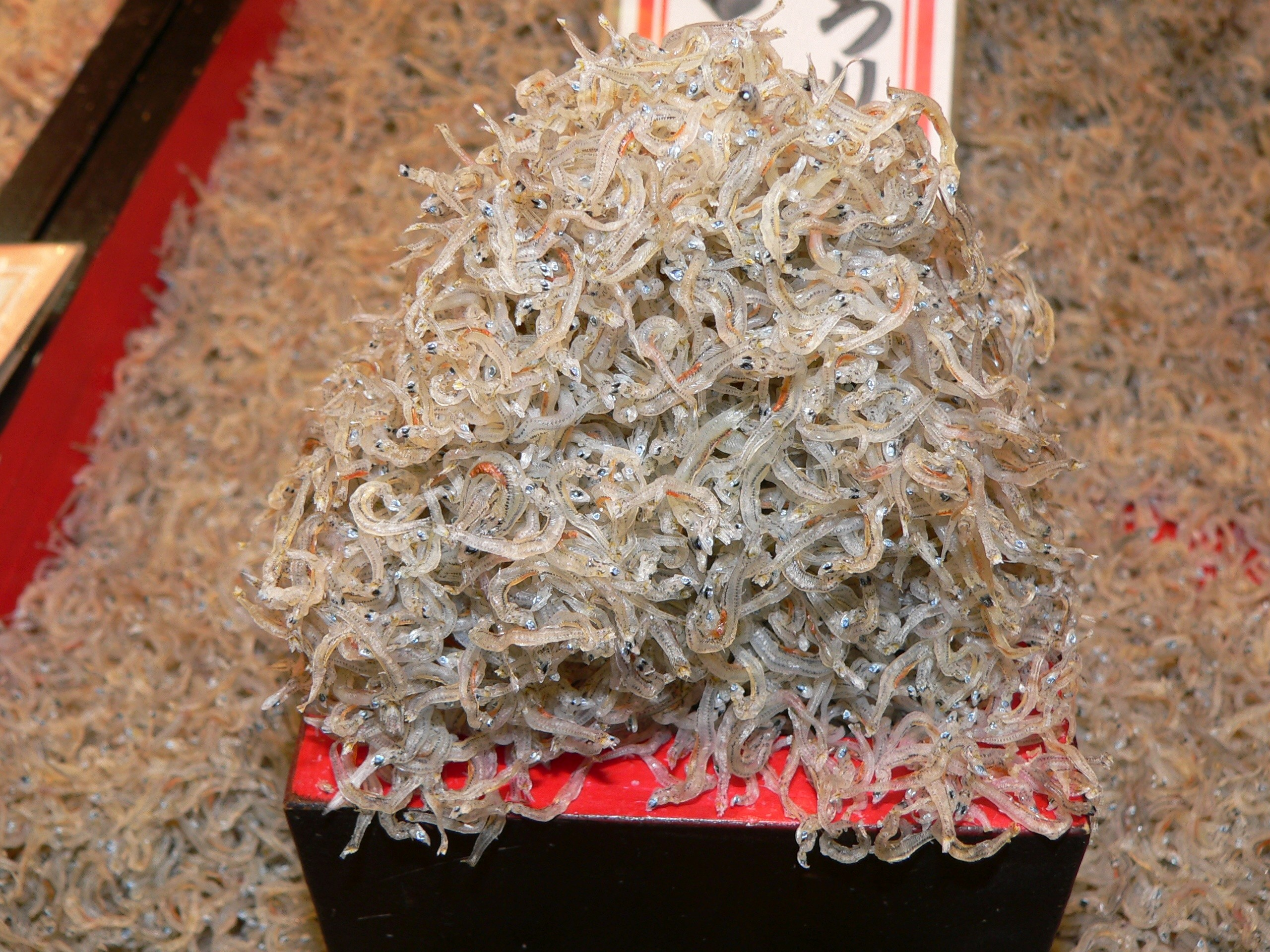
Japanese whitebait

In Japan, the whitebait (しらす/白子, shirasu) (Note: The kana script "しらす/シラス" may be preferred, since the kanji "白子" may also be read as shirako which means the soft roe of any fish.) fishing industry is concentrated in Shizuoka Prefecture, where the major landing ports for them are situated. The shirasu boiled in salted hot water is called kamaage shirasu (釜上げしらす; boiled whitebait), and this product retains about 85% or greater water ratio.

The boiled whitefish which are subsequently semi-dried are referred to generally as shirasuboshi (しらす干し; literally 'dried whitebait'), but this is in the wider sense of the term; in the stricter sense shirasuboshi (also known as Kantō boshi, or 'Eastern Japan–style dried') refers to soft-dried products (50–85% water ratio), (Note: Also the boiling water is saltier at around 15% saline. Drying time is approximately 30 minutes.) and distinguished from chirimen-jako (縮緬雑魚) (aka Kansai boshi or 'Western Japan style dried') which are dried to harder consistency (30% to shy of 50% water content.) (Note: The boiling water used is a milder 5–6% saline solution. Drying time is longer at 1.5 hours.)

The whitebait used in these shirasu products is generally the larvae of the Japanese anchovy, but in the vernacular Japanese language anchovy (片口鰯, katakuchi iwashi) is called a type of sardine (鰯, iwashi), thus shirasu may be (somewhat misleadingly) described as sardine fry in some literature, though the larvae of clupeids do occur as bycatch in the shirasu being harvested. The shirasu landed in Shizuoka Prefecture consists of the 2–3 month old, and 1–2 cm length larvae of mostly Japanese anchovy, and a small proportion of Japanese pilchard (真鰯, ma iwashi), Sardinops sagax melanostictus, a subspecies of sardine. (Note: Also 1% the larvae of urume iwashi (潤目鰯) (Etrumeus teres syn. Etrumeus sadina) or red-eye round herring). Though the Japanese vernacular name suggest it to be a type of sardine (iwashi).)

One specialty product is the tatami iwashi (たたみいわし; literally 'tatami sardine'), a paper-thin square wafer made from uncooked dry shirasu, spreading the washed fish thinly inside square molds then drying them, which has become an expensive delicacy.

=== New Zealand ===
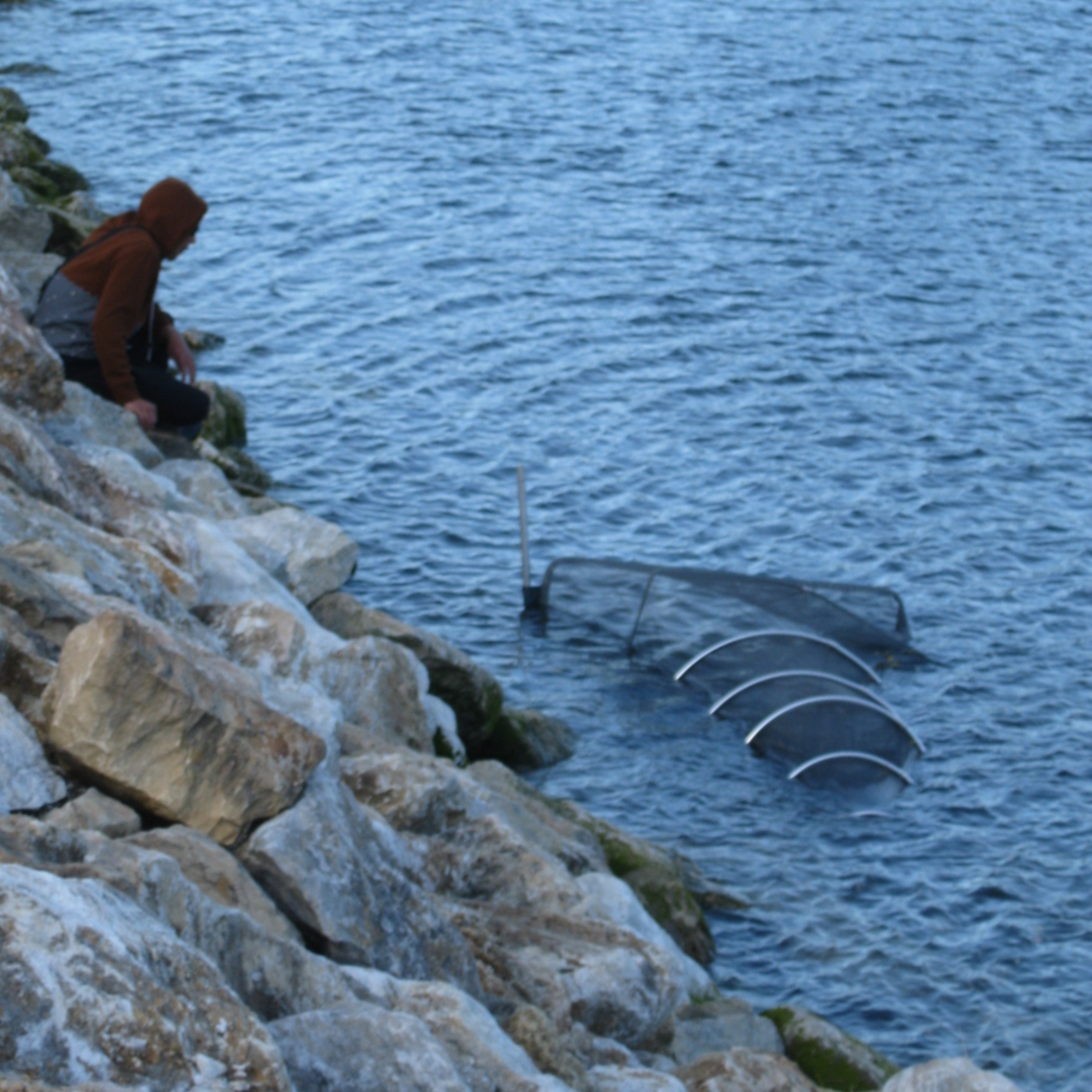
Whitebait net set alongside a flood-control bank in New Zealand

New Zealand whitebait are the juveniles of five galaxiid species which live as adults in freshwater rivers and streams. Four of these five species have been classified by the Department of Conservation as endangered. The whitebait are caught during their migration into freshwater habitats after their larval stage at sea. They are much smaller than Chinese or British whitebait, averaging 45–55 mm in length, and are around 15–22 weeks old.

Freshly-caught whitebait in a bucket, Okarito, West Coast, New Zealand

The most common whitebait species in New Zealand is the common galaxias or inanga, which lays its eggs during the very high spring tides in autumn amongst bankside grasses that are flooded by the tide. The eggs develop out of the water until inundated by the next spring tide which stimulates the eggs to hatch. The larvae are then carried to sea on the outgoing tide where they join the ocean's plankton. After approximately six months, the juvenile fish migrate back into freshwater habitats where they mature to adulthood. The four other galaxiid species in New Zealand whitebait are the kōaro, banded kōkopu, giant kōkopu and shortjaw kōkopu. These species also spawn in bankside vegetation, but their spawning is triggered by autumn floods rather than tides.

New Zealand whitebait are caught in the lower reaches of the rivers using large, open-mouthed, hand-held scoop nets, long sock nets, or rigid, typically wedge-shaped set nets. Whitebaiters must constantly attend the nets in order to lift them as soon as a shoal enters the net; otherwise the whitebait quickly swim back out of the net. Whitebaiters may fish from platforms known as 'stands', which may include screens to direct the fish and systems for raising and lowering nets.

Whitebaiting in New Zealand is a seasonal activity with a legally fixed and limited period which spans part of the annual migration. The timing of the allowed fishing season is set to target the more common inanga, while avoiding the less common species that mainly migrate before and after the whitebaiting season. There is strict control over net sizes and rules against blocking the river or channelling the fish into the net; these measures allow some fish to reach the adult habitats. The whitebait themselves are very sensitive to objects in the river and are adept at dodging the nets.

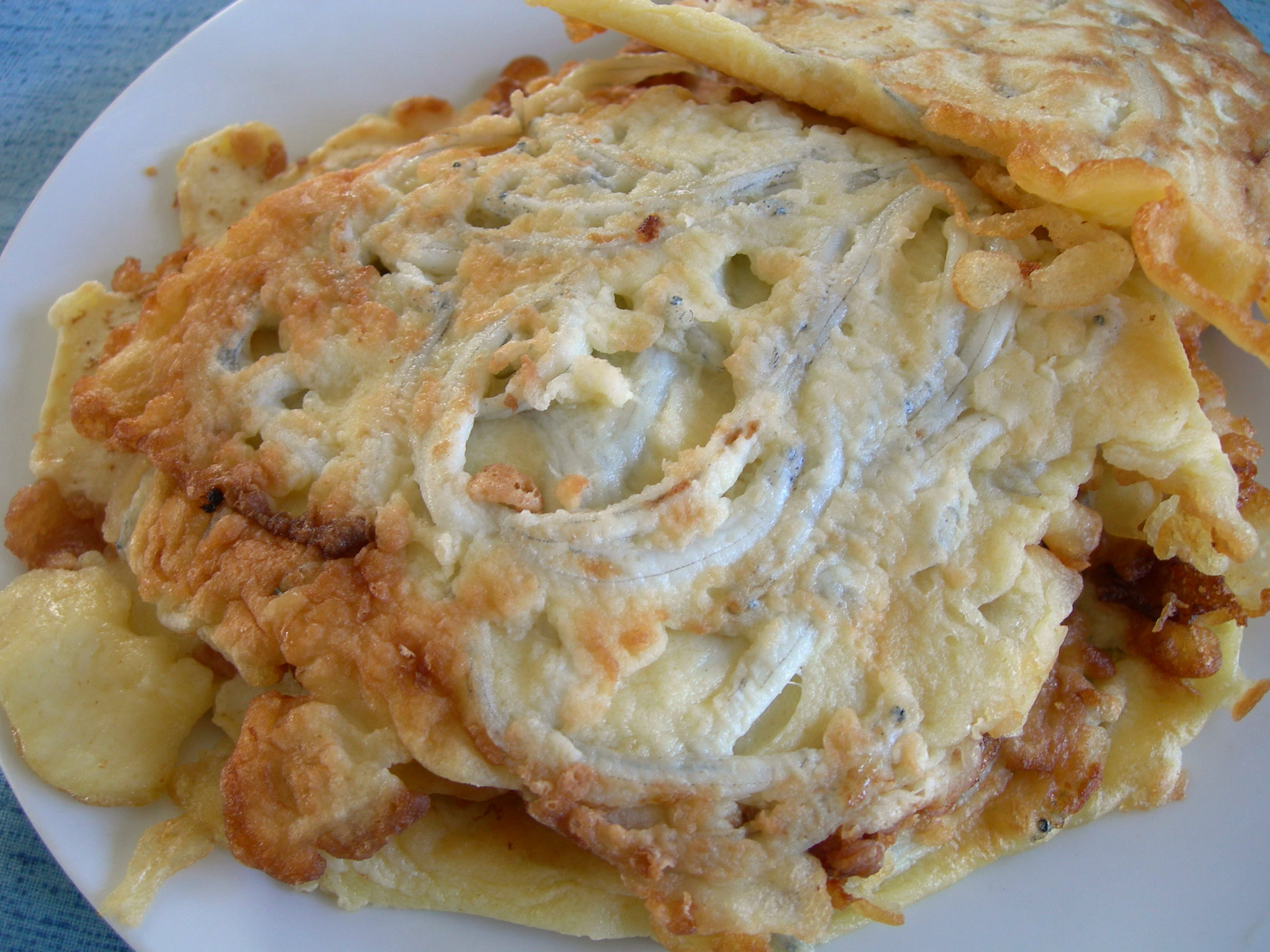
New Zealand whitebait fritters

Whitebait is a traditional food for Maori, and was widely eaten by European settlers in the 19th century. By the 20th century, the price of whitebait rose and it became known as a delicacy. Currently, it commands high prices to the extent that it is the most expensive fish on the market, when available. The wholesale price (NZD) is typically $60–$70 per kilogram ($27–$32/lb), but the retail price can be up to $140 per kilogram ($64/lb). It is normally sold fresh in small quantities, although some are frozen to extend the sale period. Nevertheless, whitebait can normally only be purchased during or close after the netting season. The most popular way of cooking whitebait in New Zealand is the whitebait fritter, which is essentially an omelette containing whitebait. Purists use only the egg white in order to minimise interfering with the taste of the bait.

The degradation of waterways through forest clearance, and the impacts of agriculture and urbanisation, have caused the whitebait catch to decline. The loss of suitable spawning habitat has been particularly severe, especially for inanga, which rely on dense riparian vegetation lining the tidal portions of waterways. Amongst other factors, a lack of shade over waterways has been shown to kill developing whitebait eggs.

=== Taiwan ===
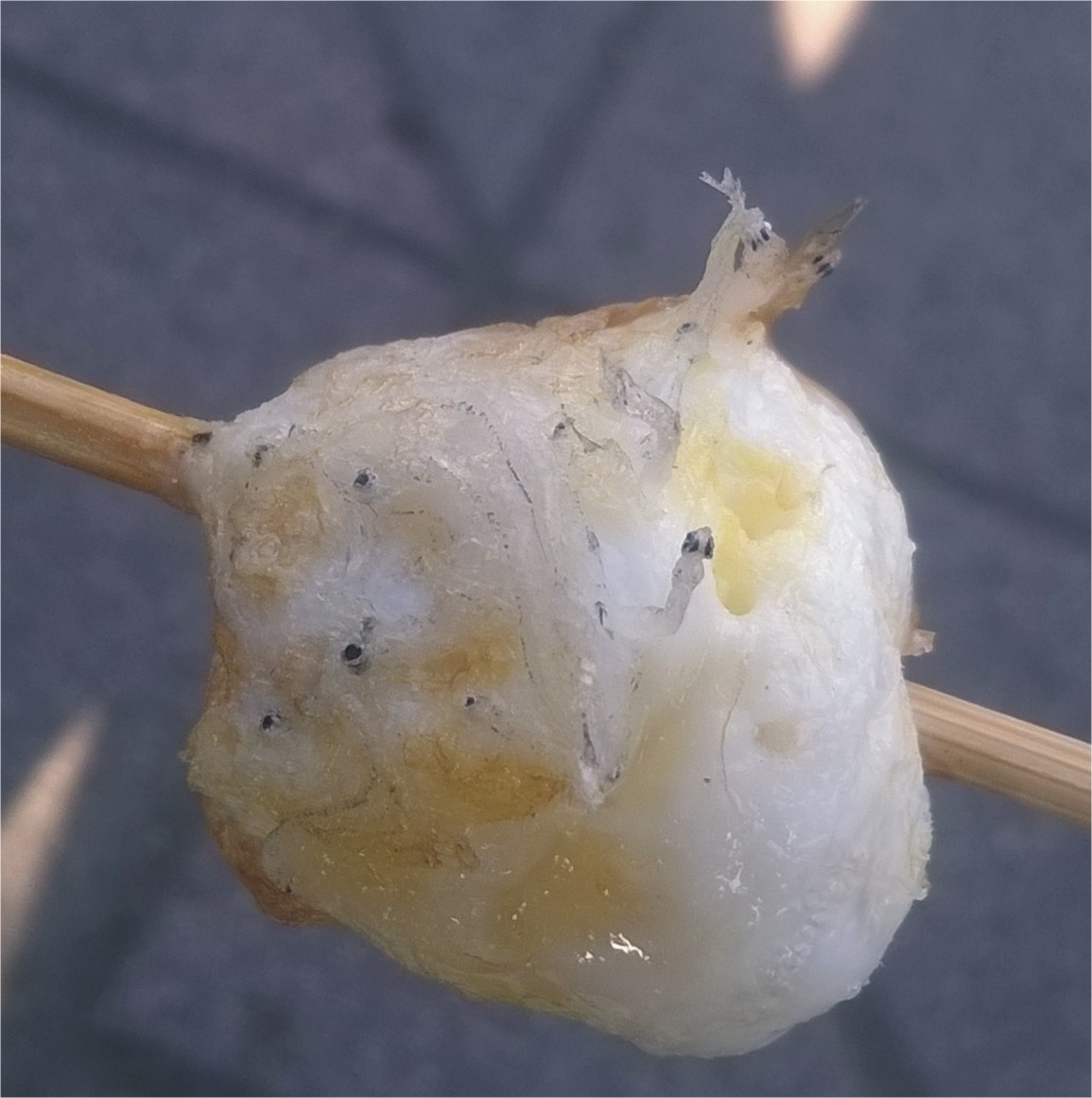
A grilled bird egg bought from Tamsui Old Street, with whitebait as a topping

According to the Fisheries Agency of Taiwan, whitebait (Chinese: 魩仔魚 or 吻仔魚, Taiwanese Hokkien: but-á-hî) refers to juveniles of anchovy and clupeidae, and mostly are buccaneer anchovy, shorthead anchovy, and Japanese anchovy. Their adult form can grow up to about 10 centimetres long, but they are not popular in the local market and are usually used as fishing bait.

Taiwan's geographical environment facilitates the movement of whitebait to feeding areas, such as estuaries and bays, through the action of currents and tides. Therefore, several fishing grounds for whitebait are available in Taiwan. Main production areas of Whitebait include Tamsui, Toucheng, and Fangliao. The catch varies between approximately 500 and 3,450 tons. Seine fishing is the common method used to catch whitebait.

In Taiwan, while most whitebait consist of anchovies and clupeids, which occupied 85% of the total catch, some other juvenile fish may also be caught, including juvenile mackerel, skipjack tuna, ribbonfish, bombay duck, moonfish, and daggertooth pike conger. The breeding season from June to August is the most likely time to get other juvenile fish. Other juvenile fish can occupied 76.65% of the total catch in extreme cases. For this reason, the government of Taiwan prohibits catching whitebait from May to September. The catch was around 1,000 tons after the prohibiting order.

Concerns about catching other juvenile fish have increased among the local public, and they have therefore tried to launch a boycott of whitebait, or even a government ban on catching whitebait. Liao Hung-chi, a Taiwanese writer and conservationist, wrote an essay in 2011 calling for a boycott of whitebait, believing that fish depletion in Taiwan resulted from overfishing whitebait. His essay had been spread in Facebook and news press. Some other conservationists described whitebait as "more than 200 species of juvenile fish were caught". Ming-Anne Lee (李明安), local expert of whitebait, opposed the claim of "200 species". Some questioned about the government's enforcement in 2013. In 2021, Lee reported that other juvenile fish accounted for less than 10% of the total catch. He therefore concluded that the government's enforcement is effective and can prevent catching other juvenile fish. The Taiwan Ocean Conservation and Fisheries Sustainability Foundation listed whitebait as "consume with caution" on the guideline of consuming fish in 2021, citing the concern of catching other juvenile fish by given the way of fishing whitebait, and the fact that whitebait are also food of other larger fish.

=== United Kingdom ===
In the United Kingdom today, whitebait principally refers to the fry of Clupeidae fish, young sprats, most commonly herring. They are normally deep-fried, coated in flour or a light batter, and served very hot with sprinkled lemon juice and bread and butter.

Records of whitebait as a food in England date back to 1612. By the 1780s it was fashionable to dine on whitebait. In those days, whitebait was thought to be a species or group on its own right, and the French zoologist Valenciennes proposed that whitebait was a new genus, which he called Rogenia. In 1903, Dr James Murie, in his 'Report on the sea fisheries and fishing industry of the Thames estuary' conducted studies on the contents of boxes sold as whitebait. He discovered that some boxes of whitebait contained up to 31 species of immature fish, including the fry of eel, plaice, whiting, herring sprat and bass, along with shrimp, crab, octopus and even jellyfish.

For Londoners in the 19th century and before, summer excursions down the Thames to Greenwich or Blackwall to dine on whitebait were popular. For instance, the Cabinet undertook such a trip every year shortly before the prorogation of Parliament. An annual whitebait festival takes place in Southend.

=== Puerto Rico ===
Residents of Arecibo, Puerto Rico traditionally fish for whitebait at the mouth of the Río Grande de Arecibo. The fish are known locally as cetí and classified as Pellona bleekeriana or Sicydium plumieri.

== Elvers ==
Elvers are young eels. Traditionally, fishermen consumed elvers as a cheap dish, but environmental changes have reduced eel populations. Similar to whitebait, they are now considered a delicacy and are priced at up to 1000 euros per kilogram.

== Cuttlefish, octopus and squid ==
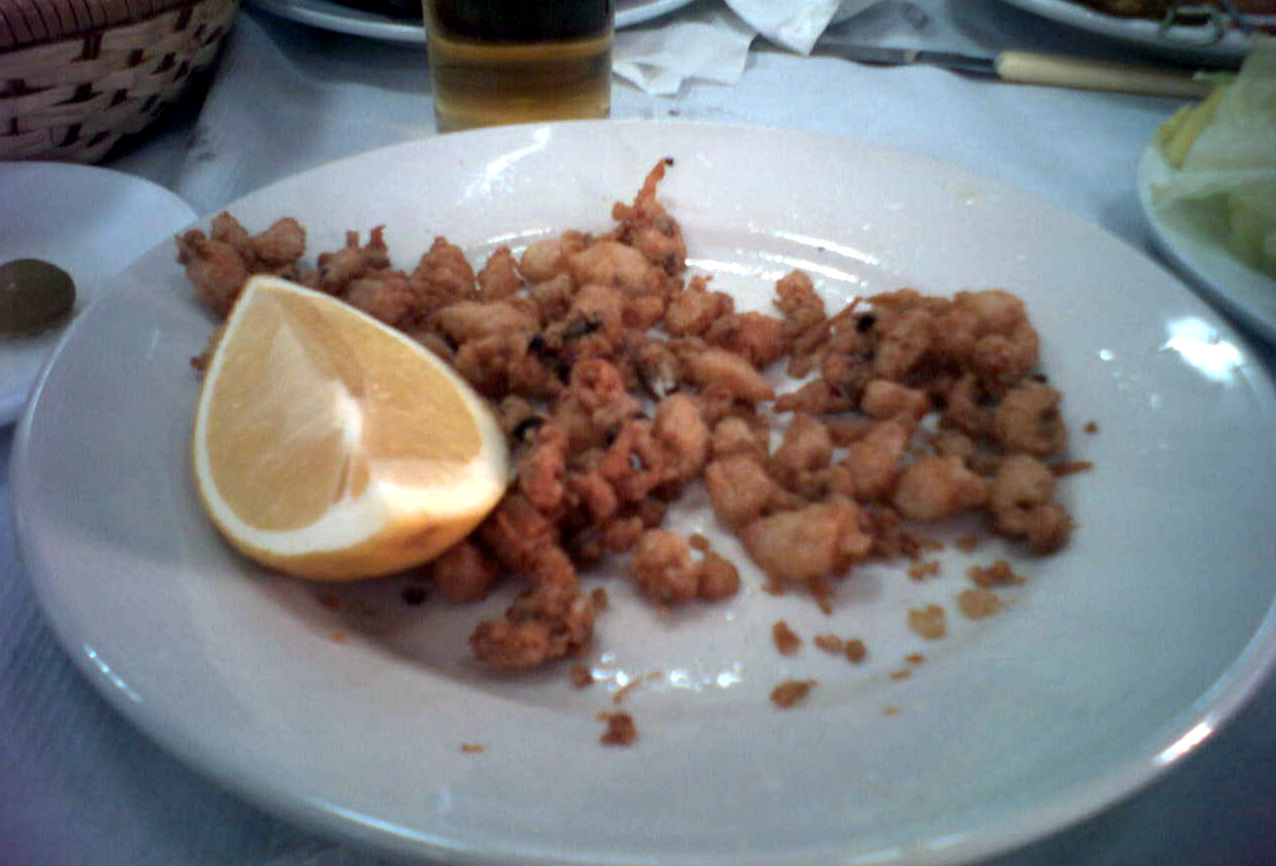
Puntillitas, small whole fried squid, a popular Spanish tapas

Battered and fried baby cephalopods (usually cuttlefish, but sometimes squid or octopus), known as puntillitas or chopitos, are popular in southern Spain and the Balearic Islands and possibly elsewhere.
