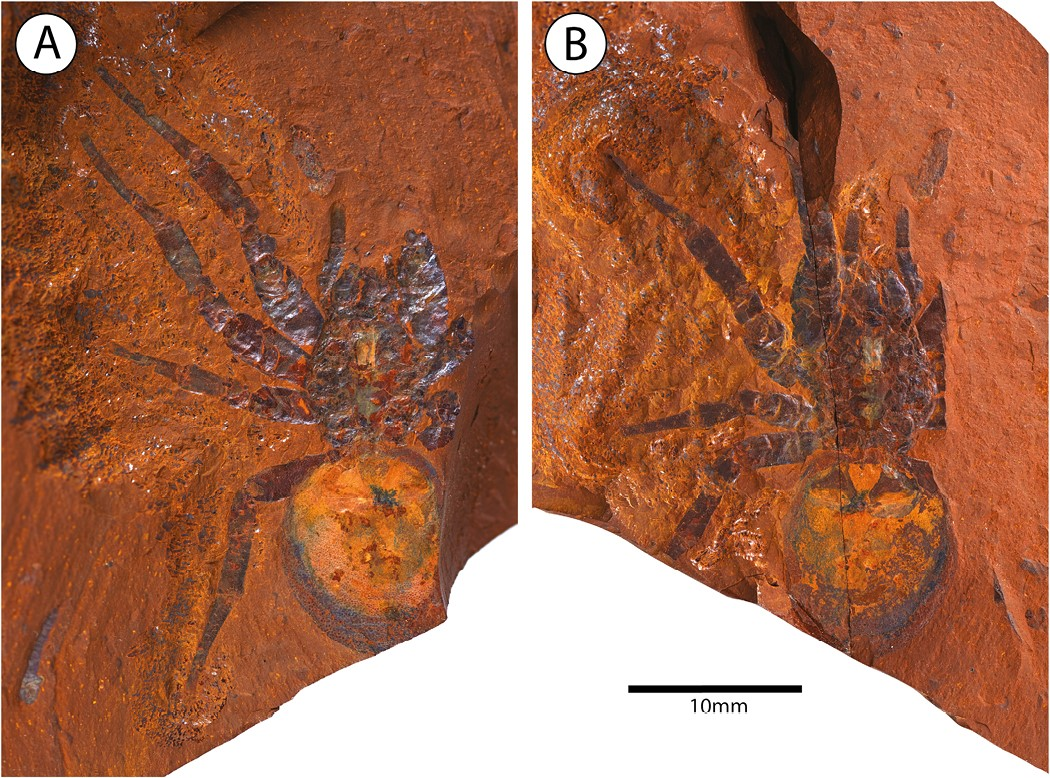
- Holotype specimen (AM F.145559)

Scientific classification
- Kingdom: Animalia
- Phylum: Arthropoda
- Subphylum: Chelicerata
- Class: Arachnida
- Order: Araneae
- Infraorder: Mygalomorphae
- Family: Barychelidae
- Genus: †Megamonodontium; McCurry et al., 2023
- Species: †M. mccluskyi

Binomial name
- †Megamonodontium mccluskyi McCurry et al., 2023

= Megamonodontium =

Megamonodontium Temporal range: 16–11 Ma Miocene

Extinct species of spider

Megamonodontium mccluskyi (Mygalomorphae: Barychelidae) is an extinct species of spider from the Miocene (16–11 million years ago). Its fossil was discovered in June 2020 in New South Wales, Australia, at McGraths Flat fossil site, by Dr Simon McClusky. It is the first fossil of the Barychelidae family ever found.

Megamonodontium is the 2nd largest spider in the fossil record, along with the Middle Jurassic spider from China, Mongolorachne. With a leg span of 50 millimeters. (2 inches long) There could be even larger spiders out there in the fossil record.
