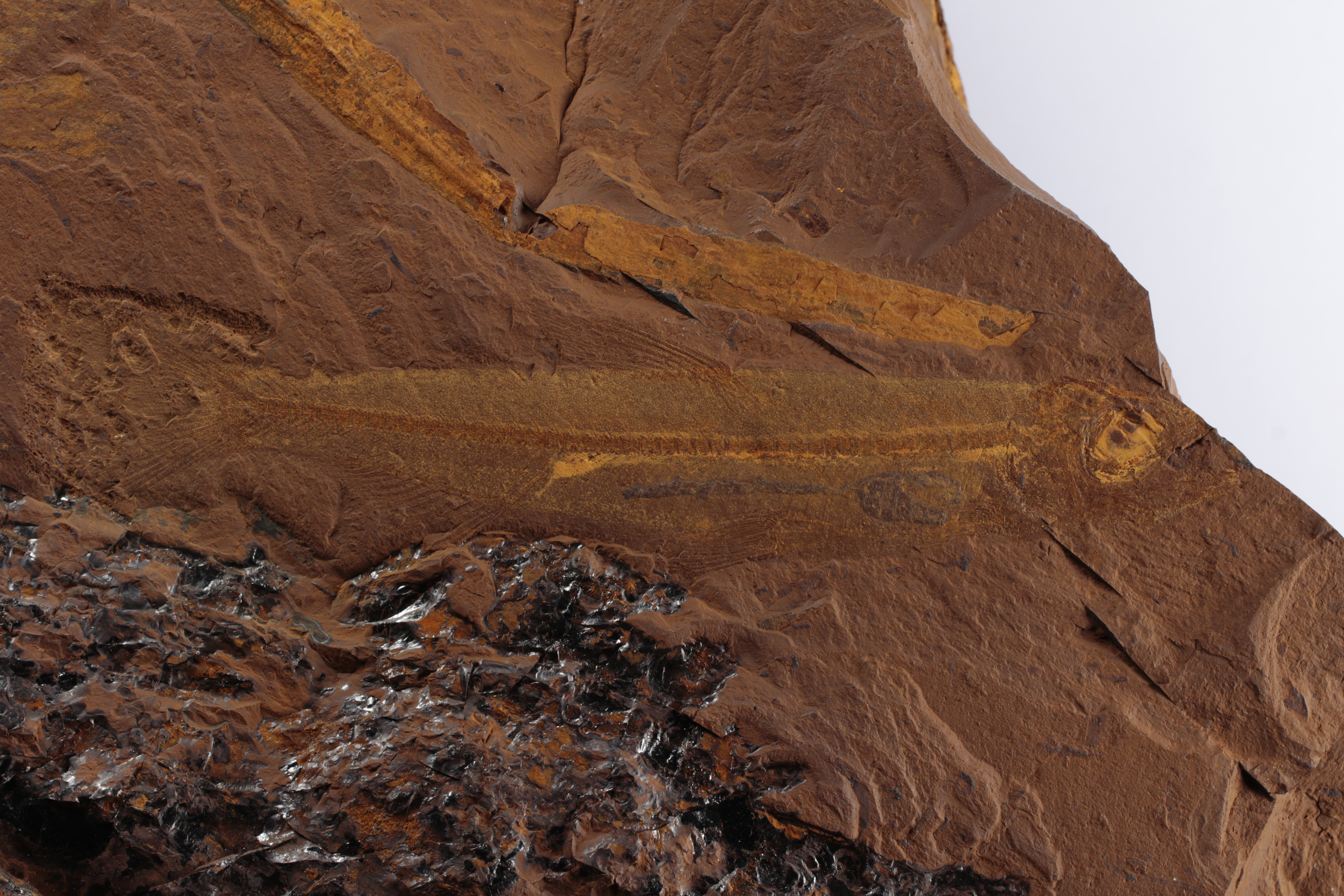
- Holotype specimen

Scientific classification
- Kingdom: Animalia
- Phylum: Chordata
- Class: Actinopterygii
- Division: Teleostei
- Order: Osmeriformes
- Suborder: Retropinnoidei
- Family: †Ferruaspidae; McCurry et al., 2025
- Genus: †Ferruaspis; McCurry et al., 2025
- Species: †F. brocksi

Binomial name
- †Ferruaspis brocksi McCurry, Gill, Baranov, Hart, Slatyer & Frese, 2025

= Ferruaspis =

Ferruaspis Temporal range: Middle Miocene, 16–11 Ma

Extinct genus of fishes

Ferruaspis (from Latin ferrum, meaning "iron", referencing its preservation in goethite, and Greek aspis, meaning "shield", a common suffix for fossil fish genera) is an extinct genus of freshwater osmeriform ray-finned fish from the Miocene of Australia. It contains a single species, F. brocksi, and is the only member of the family Ferruaspidae. It was closely related to the extant Southern Hemisphere smelts in the family Retropinnidae. It is named after professor Jochen Brocks of the Australian National University.

Ferruaspis is known from well-preserved specimens recovered from the McGraths Flat lagerstätte of New South Wales. These specimens provide a highly detailed glimpse into its life history, ecology, and physical appearance. Aside from an indeterminate percomorph fish, it is the only fish known from this site.

== Description ==
Ferruaspis specimens are unique for having poorly-preserved hard tissues (with the otoliths missing), but extremely well-preserved soft tissues down to the microscopic level. These include melanophores, which allows for the coloration of the fish to be reconstructed. Based on the melanophores, Ferruaspis was countershaded with two light stripes running horizontally across its side. Ferruaspis is one of only three prehistoric animals known to have preserved melanophores (most prehistoric animals for which color can be reconstructed have preserved melanosomes instead), alongside an indeterminate colubrid snake from the Miocene of Spain and a specimen of the ichthyosaur Stenopterygius.

== Ecology ==
The stomach contents of Ferruaspis primarily consist of the larvae of the phantom midge Chaoborus abundans, whose fossils are common in the McGraths Flat deposits. Aside from a small bivalve recovered in the stomach of one specimen, these suggest that Ferruaspis inhabited the pelagic zone of the lake and fed near the surface. In addition, one specimen of Ferruaspis shows infection by a glochidium, a larva of a river mussel that parasitizes fish early in its life. This suggests that the freshwater mussels relied on Ferruaspis as a host for part of their life cycle.

Ferruaspis inhabited an oxbow lake ecosystem surrounded by temperate rainforest. This lake was located significantly inland from any marine ecosystem, and west of the Great Dividing Range. This suggests that unlike most extant retropinnids, which have an amphidromous lifestyle, Ferruaspis lived in a freshwater habitat for its entire life. However, it is possible that Ferruaspis was a species with both amphidromous and land-locked populations that spent their entire lives in freshwater, with the McGraths Flat fossils representing the latter.
