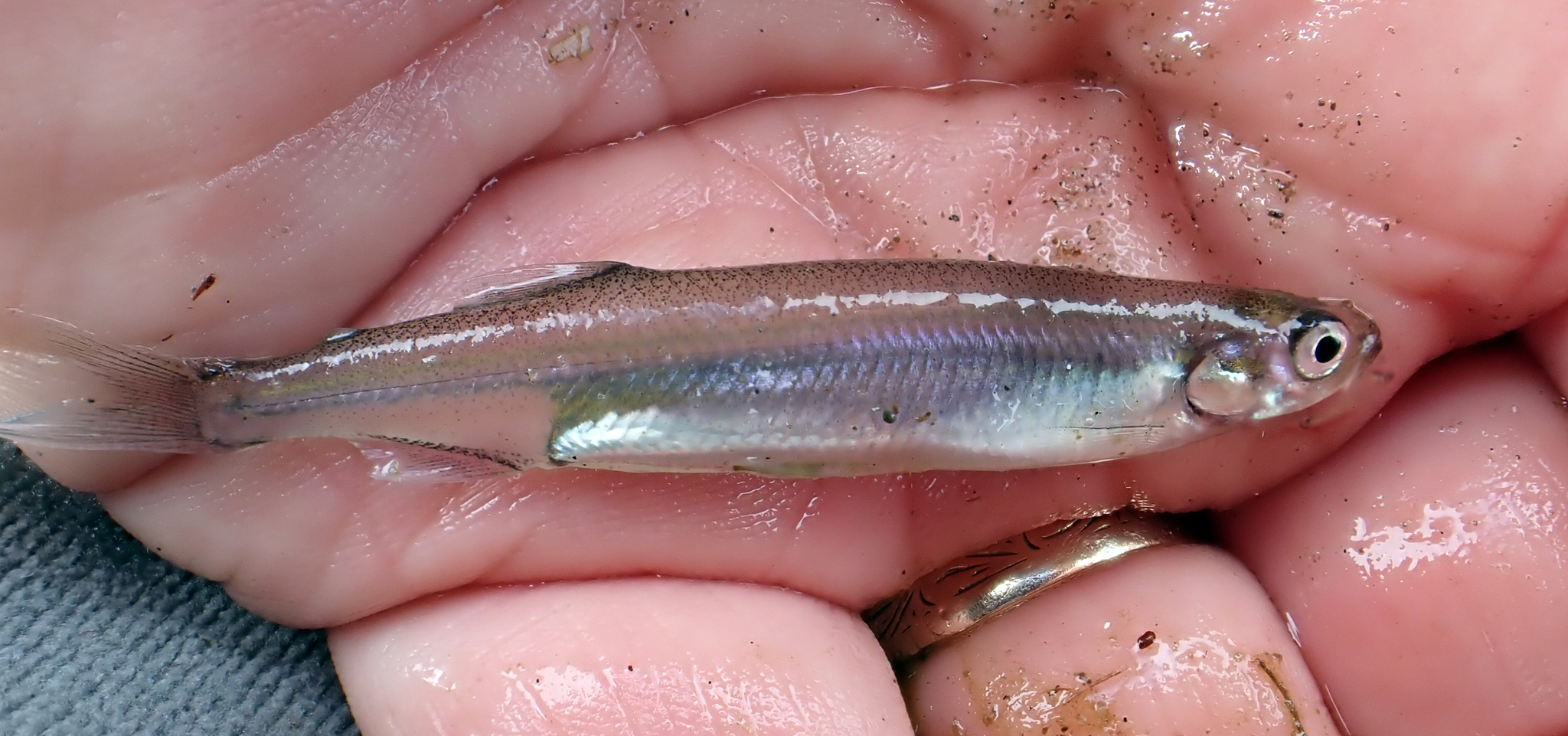

Conservation status
- Least Concern (IUCN 3.1)

Scientific classification
- Kingdom: Animalia
- Phylum: Chordata
- Class: Actinopterygii
- Order: Osmeriformes
- Family: Retropinnidae
- Genus: Retropinna
- Species: R. retropinna

Binomial name
- Retropinna retropinna (J. Richardson, 1848)
- Approximate known distribution (in orange) of the New Zealand smelt on a map of New Zealand

= New Zealand smelt =

Species of fish

The New Zealand smelt (Retropinna retropinna), also known as the New Zealand common smelt, New Zealand cucumber fish, or silveries is a smelt of the family Retropinnidae, found only in New Zealand at shallow depths in estuaries and rivers. Their length is between 8 and 13 cm.

== Description ==
Retropinna retropinna are elongated silver green fish with clear fins, just larger than palm size. Smelt can be identified by the adipose fin, a small fleshy nub, located halfway between the dorsal fin and the tail. Scales, a forked tail and a distinct "cucumber smell" are other ways of distinguishing Smelt from other species. There are two species of smelt in New Zealand, the common smelt and Stokell's smelt which can only be told apart by the size and number of scales. The length of a common smelt is between 8 and 13 cm.

== Distribution and habitat ==
Common smelt are widespread in North Island waterways, but are less common in the South Island (Stokell's smelt are only found on the central east coast of the South Island). Smelt are found in coastal seas and estuaries as well as in freshwater streams as far as they can migrate. While common smelt are not a climbing species, they are good swimmers and have been found up to 220 kilometres inland at an altitude of 150m.

=== Habitat ===
Smelt are sensitive to stress which means they have a narrow range of preferred conditions. Smelt live in waters between 15 and 17 degrees Celsius although they have been known to cope with temperatures up to 27 degrees. Smelt prefer waters with a pH of 8–9 and low levels of sedimentation. There are records of smelt being both non-diadromous (land-locked) as well as anadromous (fish that spend most of their life cycle in saltwater, returning to freshwater only to breed). The Department of Conservation (2015) reports that smelt live in large shoals in estuaries, spending most of their lives at sea, but returning to freshwater as adults in the summertime. They also report that smelt can be found in lakes and lowland rivers, which is confirmed by NIWA, which states that smelt are a widespread indigenous freshwater fish.

== Life cycle/phenology ==
To better understand the life cycle of the smelt the population must first be broken down into two groups: lacustrine/reservoir and diadromous populations. Lacustrine or reservoir referring to lake and artificially created water bodies and diadromous referring to fish that spend their life partially in freshwater, partially in saltwater. Diadromous smelt spend the first life stage in the sea, estuary or lower parts of rivers. In the mature stage, during spring, adults migrate upstream into lakes through river access. The fish populations then feed throughout Summer and early Autumn, spawning in late Autumn on sand bars. Lacustrine and reservoir smelt do not migrate, but rather feed and reproduce inside their habitats. The smelt is a semelparous species, meaning that adults usually die after spawning, at around one year of age. While not much is known about smelt breeding habits, it has been theorised that smelt may spawn several times per breeding season, but not over more than one season. The preferred conditions for spawning are: clean sand in water 0.5 to 2.5 metres deep in slow moving or "slack" waters. The required period for egg incubation decreases as water temperature increases, with optimal temperatures between 14 and 18 degrees Celsius. The fastest incubation times observed were found in lacustrine rather than diadromous smelt, with 8 – 10 days for lacustrine fish as compared to 10 – 18 days for the diadromous populations. Once the larvae have hatched they disperse through the water column at depths up to 40 metres. Larvae size ranges from 4 millimetres to approximately 30 millimetres. Once larvae have exceeded the 25mm mark they are classed as juveniles. During this stage their behaviour changes from "planktonic" to surface orientated. They begin to form schools and their depth range reduces to just 20 metres. Smelt are naturally a shoaling species, which means they prefer to swim near the surface in schools rather than resting or hiding in the aquatic substrate/. At 30 mm long, the Smelt can migrate and by 50 mm of length they are classed as adults, where their depth range is much larger – anywhere between 20 and 70 metres deep.

== Diet and foraging ==
In the larvae stage, smelt feed mainly on Rotifers (microscopic aquatic animals) rather than Zooplankton. When Smelt progress to the juvenile stage their diet changes to Copepods and Cladocerans – small crustaceans and water fleas respectively. Adult smelt feed on zooplankton and small insect larvae that they are able to catch on the surface. Little else is known about their eating habits, but aquatic vegetation can be ruled out as smelt are reportedly seen only on the surface and body of streams, and have never been observed feeding on substrate.

== Predators, parasites, and diseases ==
While smelt eggs are preyed upon by adult bullies in lacustrine areas, there are no recorded predators of Smelt larvae. Adult lacustrine Smelt are the primary prey species for North Island trout, while juvenile migrating Smelt are more likely to be caught by ‘whitebaiters’ as they move upstream alongside galaxiids. As well as trout, Smelt are also preyed upon by many species of birds. Black and Red Billed Gulls feed mainly on juvenile Smelt while Adults are preyed upon by Pied Shags and Little Black Shags. Schools of shags ‘drive’ the Smelt by swimming and diving in formation to feed on them. Shags are considered to be the primary bird predator of adult Smelt.

The main parasites of the smelt include black spot, Glochidia, Cestodes and Saprolegnia. Black spot is a cyst that forms under the surface of the skin, while Cestodes are juvenile freshwater mussels that use the Smelt species to travel to suitable habitats. Saprolegnia is a fungal fin infection that occurs when an injury has been sustained.

== Other information ==
Smelt have traditionally been caught by Māori in the past in scoop nets known as Hīnaki. The fish could then be eaten fresh or dried in the sun to preserve them. Smelt were known to the Māori as pōrohe and paraki. Smelt also has another name, the cucumber fish, due to its distinctive smell when it has been caught.

== Other sources ==
- "Retropinna retropinna". Integrated Taxonomic Information System.
- Froese, Rainer; Pauly, Daniel (eds.). "Retropinna retropinna". FishBase. January 2006 version.
- Tony Ayling & Geoffrey Cox, Collins Guide to the Sea Fishes of New Zealand, (William Collins Publishers Ltd, Auckland, New Zealand 1982) ISBN 0-00-216987-8
