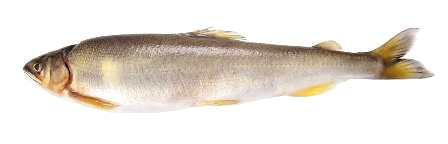

Conservation status
- Data Deficient (IUCN 3.1)

Scientific classification
- Kingdom: Animalia
- Phylum: Chordata
- Class: Actinopterygii
- Division: Teleostei
- Order: Osmeriformes
- Family: Plecoglossidae
- Genus: Plecoglossus; Temminck & Schlegel, 1846
- Species: P. altivelis

Binomial name
- Plecoglossus altivelis (Temminck & Schlegel, 1846)

Synonyms
- Salmo altivelis (Temminck & Schlegel, 1846); Plecoglossus altivelis altivelis (Temminck & Schlegel, 1846); Plecoglossus altivelis ryukyuensis (Nishida, 1988); Plecoglossus ryukyuensis (Nishida, 1988); Plecoglossus altivelis chinensis (Wu & Shan, 2005)

= Ayu sweetfish =

Species of fish

The ayu sweetfish (Plecoglossus altivelis), ayu (アユ, 鮎, 年魚, 香魚) or sweetfish, is a species of bony fish. It is the only species in the genus Plecoglossus and family Plecoglossidae. It is a relative of the smelts and other fish in the order Osmeriformes.

Native to East Asia, it is distributed in the northwestern Pacific Ocean along the coast of Hokkaidō in Japan southward to the Korean Peninsula, China, Hong Kong and northern Vietnam. It is amphidromous, moving between coastal marine waters and freshwater lakes and rivers. A few landlocked populations also exist in lakes in Japan such as Lake Biwa. Original wild populations in Taiwan became extinct in 1968 due to pollution and present extant populations were reintroduced from Japan in the 1990s.

The name "sweetfish" was inspired by the sweetness of its flesh. In reference to its typical one-year lifespan, it is also written as 年魚 ("year-fish"). Some individuals live two to three years. The ayu is the prefectural fish of Gunma Prefecture and Gifu Prefecture.

== Subspecies ==
Two to three subspecies are recognized by some authors. Others do not distinguish the subtaxa.

Subspecies include:

- P. a. altivelis (Temminck & Schlegel, 1846) (ayu, sweetfish)
- P. a. chinensis Y. F. Wu & X. J. Shan, 2005 (Chinese ayu)
- P. a. ryukyuensis M. Nishida, 1988 (Ryukyu ayu-fish) – endangered

== Biology ==
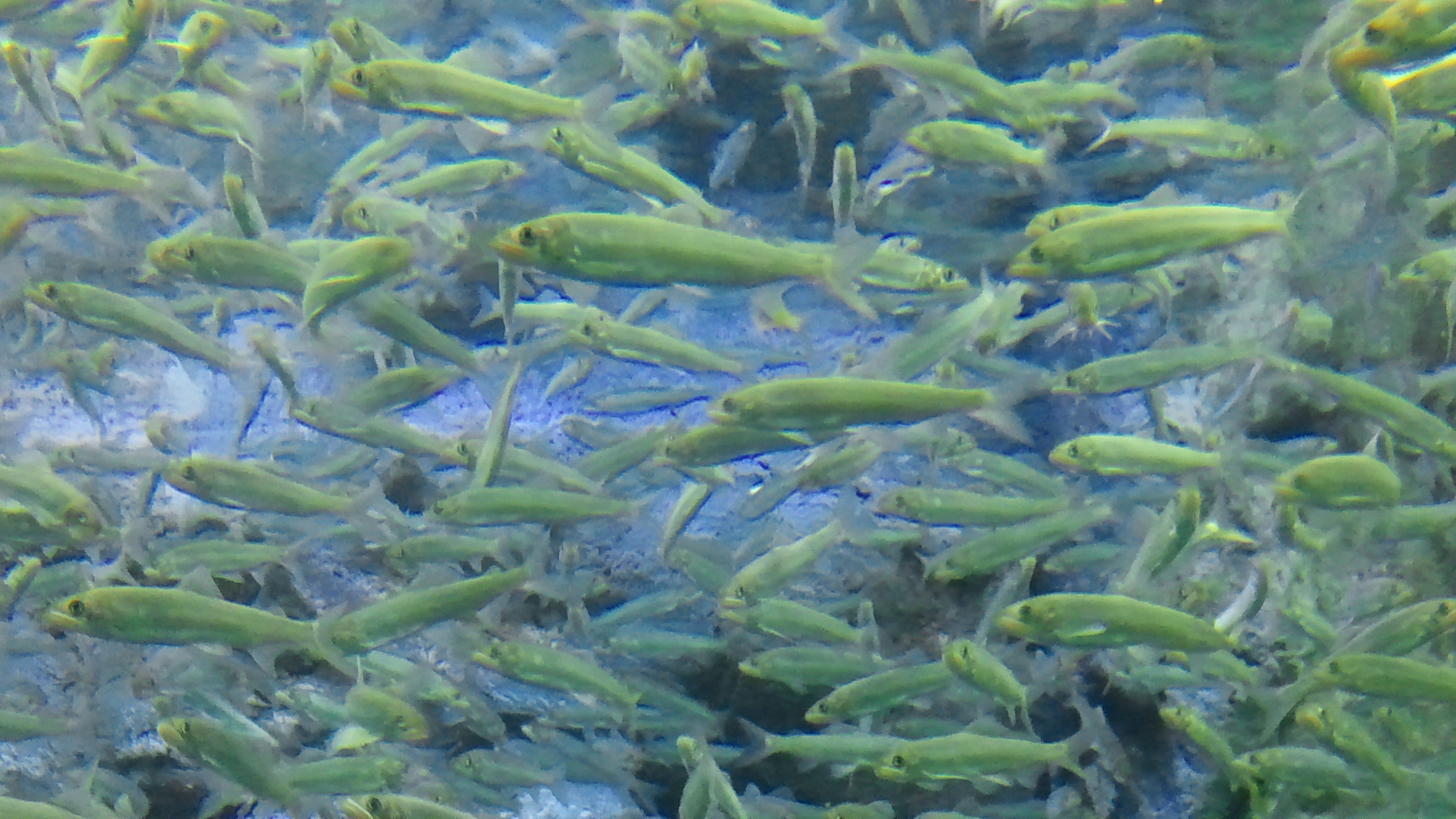
A school of ayu

An omnivore, the ayu feeds on algae, crustaceans, insects, sponges, and worms. It feeds on algae that accumulates on the rocks, scraping it off the rocks with their saw-shaped teeth. Adults typically maintain a feeding territory, but the form restricted to lakes and associated streams is schooling.

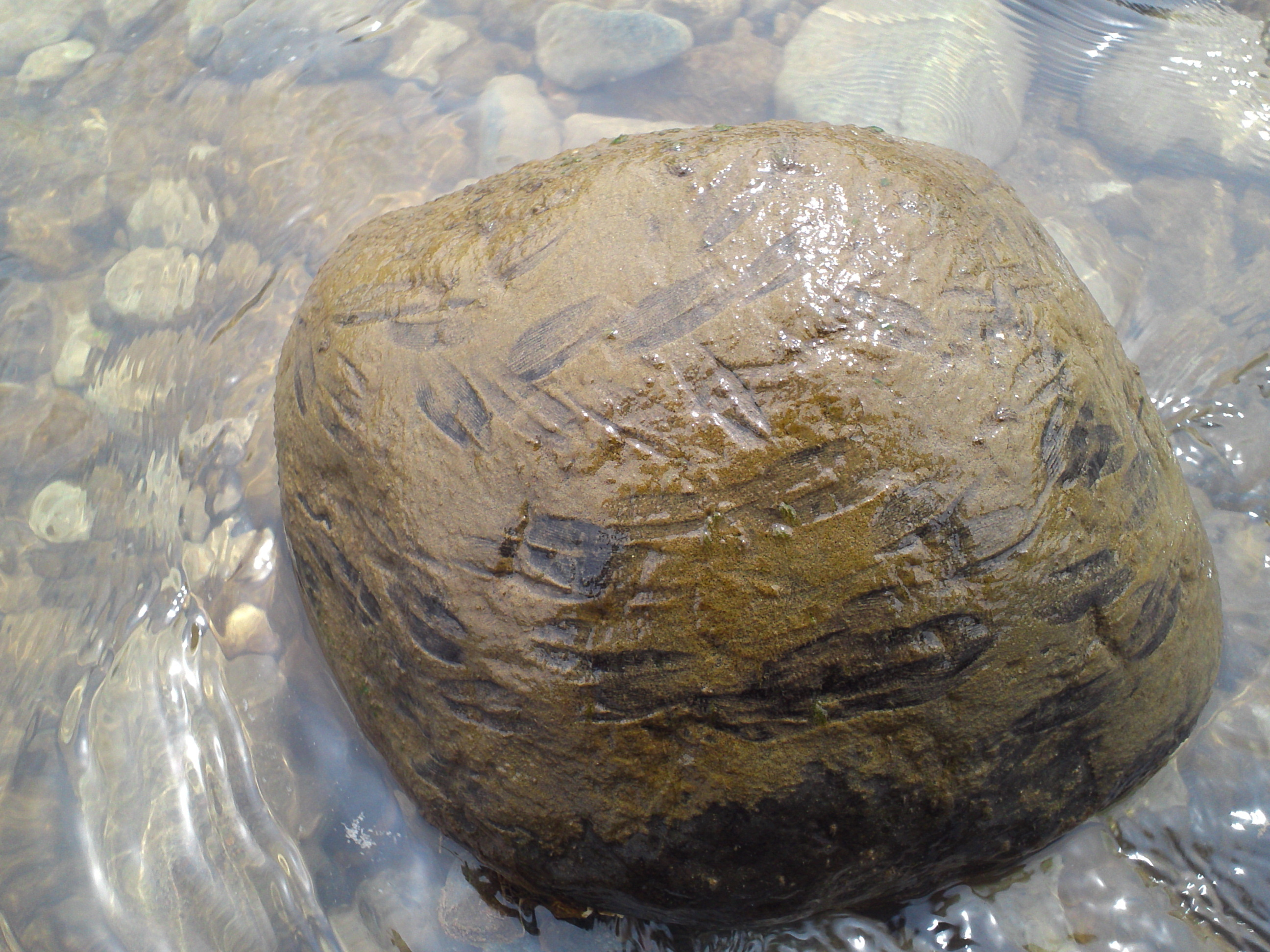
Scrape marks left by ayu feeding on algae when the rock was submerged

Most populations of this species are amphidromous and breed in the lower part of rivers during the autumn, laying their eggs in small pits they dig in the gravel. The eggs hatch shortly after and the larvae are carried downriver to the sea. They overwinter in coastal regions, staying there until the spring where the young fish typically are about 6 cm (2.5 in) long and move back to the rivers. Here they reach 15–30 cm (6–12 in) by the summer. They reach maturity by the autumn and move down to the lower part of rivers to breed. Some die after breeding and only live one year, but others return to live in the ocean and may spawn up to three times, each time moving into the lower part of rivers in the autumn. In Japan, some populations live their entire life in freshwater, only moving between lakes and the associated streams where they breed. These have a more variable migration pattern, moving upstream from the lakes in the spring, summer or autumn. Although their larvae mostly stay within freshwater, some are carried downstream with the current to the sea and become part of the amphidromous populations. The freshwater-restricted populations typically reach an age of two or three years. During the breeding season the amphidromous and freshwater-restricted forms may occur together. Ayu are also stocked in reservoirs.

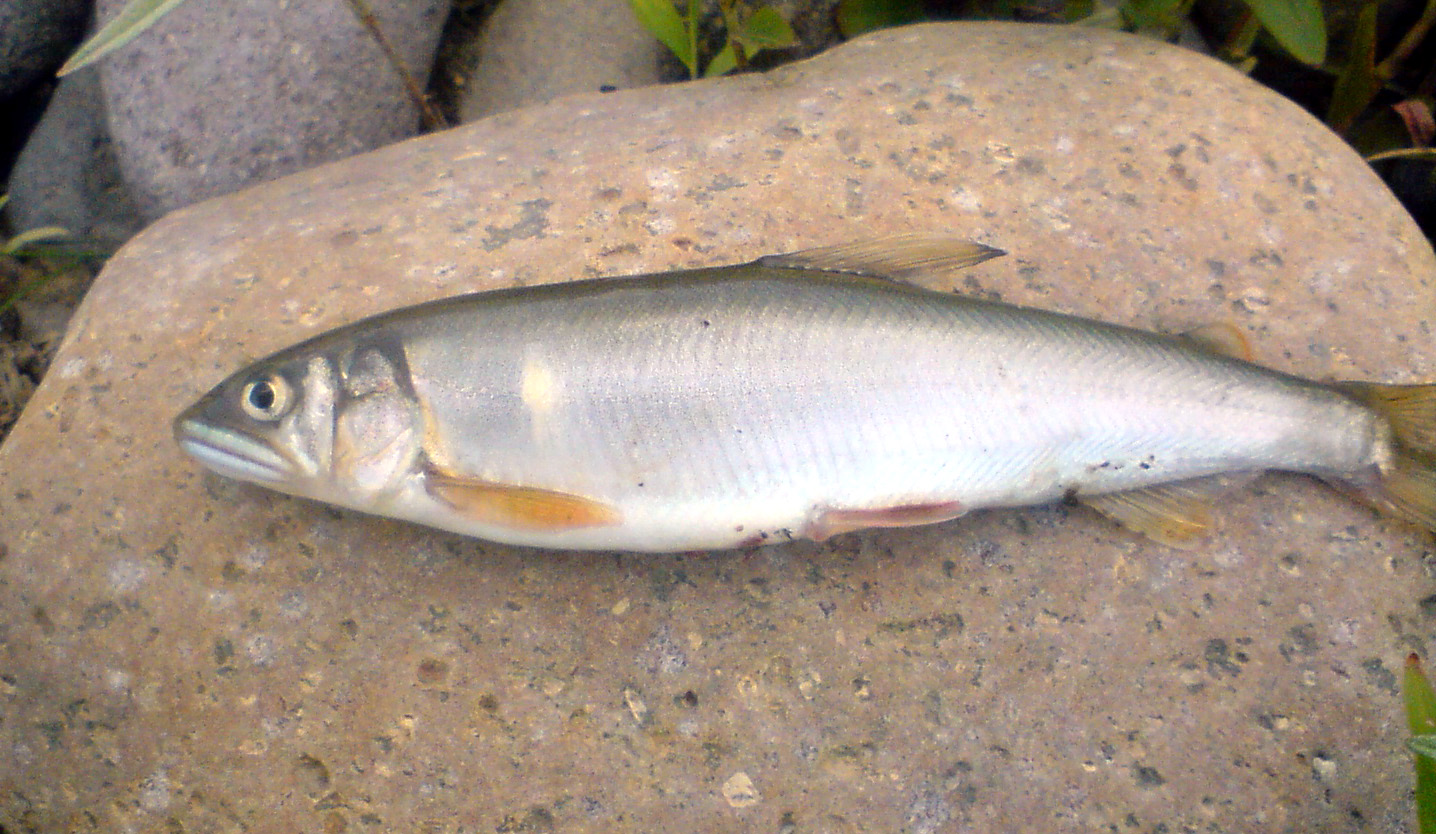
Lake Biwa ayu

Although there are reports of ayu up to 70 cm (2.3 ft) long, a more typical maximum size for the species is about 30 cm (1 ft). The form restricted to freshwater is considerably smaller than the amphidromous form. The freshwater-restricted ayu of Lake Biwa that migrate into their spawning streams in the spring can reach up to about 15 cm (6 in) in length, but those that migrate later in the year, primarily in the autumn, only grow to 10 cm (4 in). This is caused by differences in the availability of food.

== Human uses ==
Capture (blue) and aquaculture (green) production of Ayu sweetfish (Plecoglossus altivelis) in thousand tonnes from 1950 to 2022, as reported by the FAO

The ayu is highly prized for its flavour, mostly consumed in East Asia. Its flesh is distinctively sweet, with "melon and cucumber aromas". The main methods for obtaining ayu are by means of fly fishing, by using a fish trap, and by fishing with a decoy which is known as ayu-no-tomozuri in Japan. The decoy is a living ayu placed on a hook, which swims when immersed into water. It provokes the territorial behavior of other ayu, which assault the "intruder" and get caught.

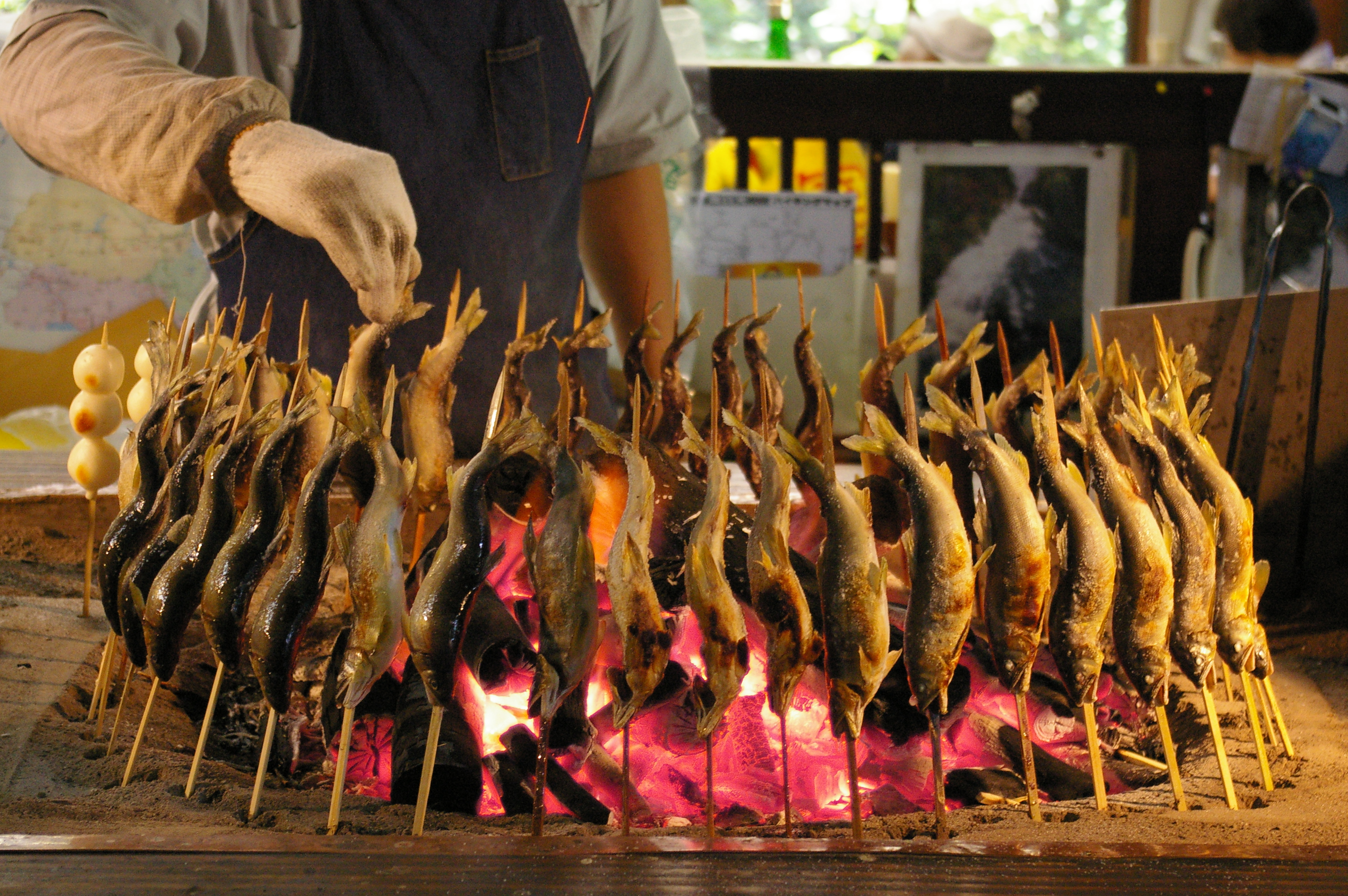
Ayu being grilled with salt in Japan; note the wave-like "swimming" shape of the skewered fish

The ayu is also caught by cormorant fishing. The practice on the Nagara River, where Japanese cormorants (Phalacrocorax capillatus) are used, draws visitors from all over the world. The Japanese cormorants, known in Japanese as umi-u (ウミウ, "sea-cormorant"), are domesticated birds trained for this purpose. The bird catches the ayu, stores it in its crop, and delivers it to the fishermen.

Ayu is also fished commercially, and captive juveniles are raised in aquaculture before being released into rivers for sport fishing.

In Japanese cuisine, a common method of preparing ayu (among other small fish) is to fold their bodies in a wave-like "swimming" shape, then skewer. The fish is then grilled with salt over charcoal to preserve the natural flavor of the fish.

== Gallery ==
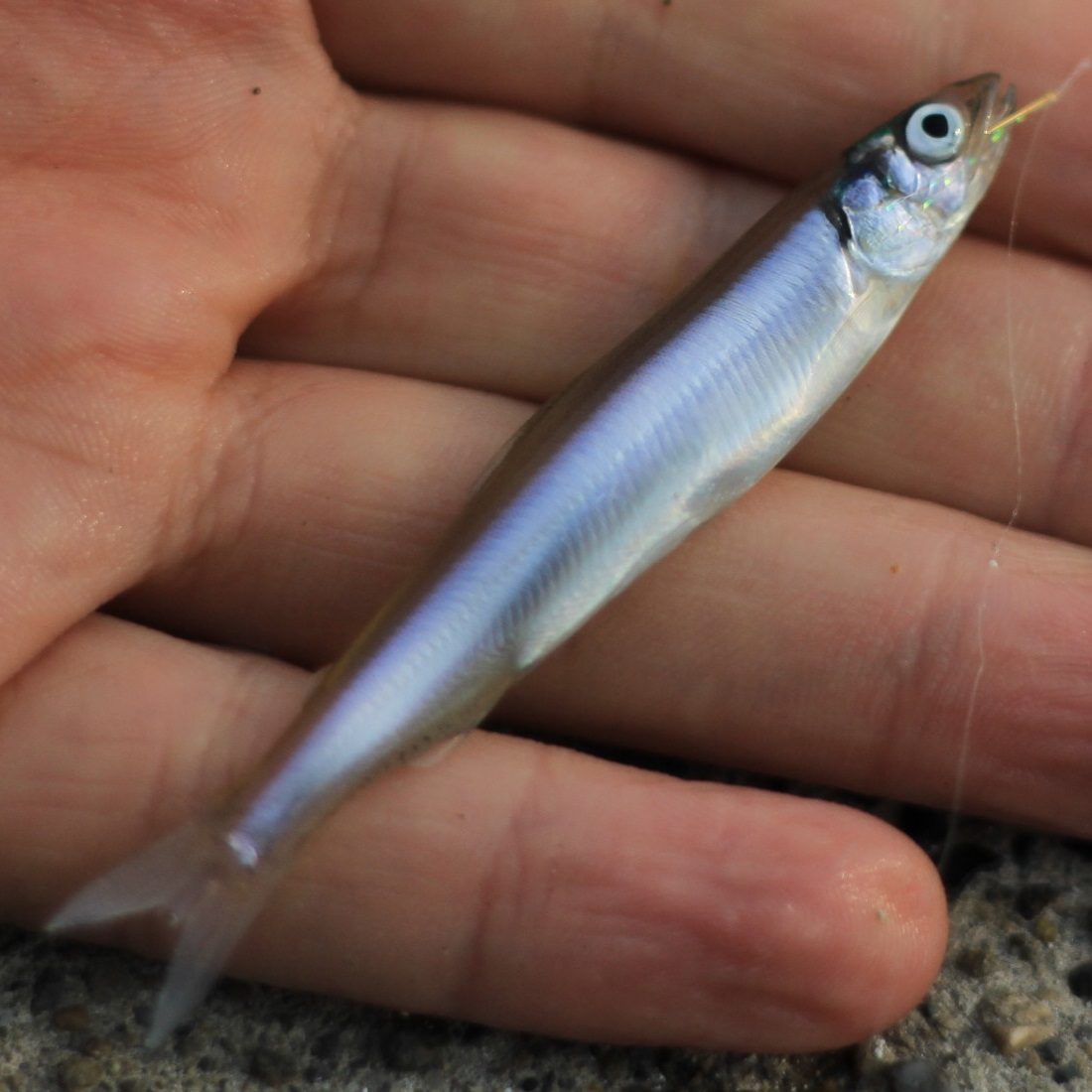
Young P. a. altivelis

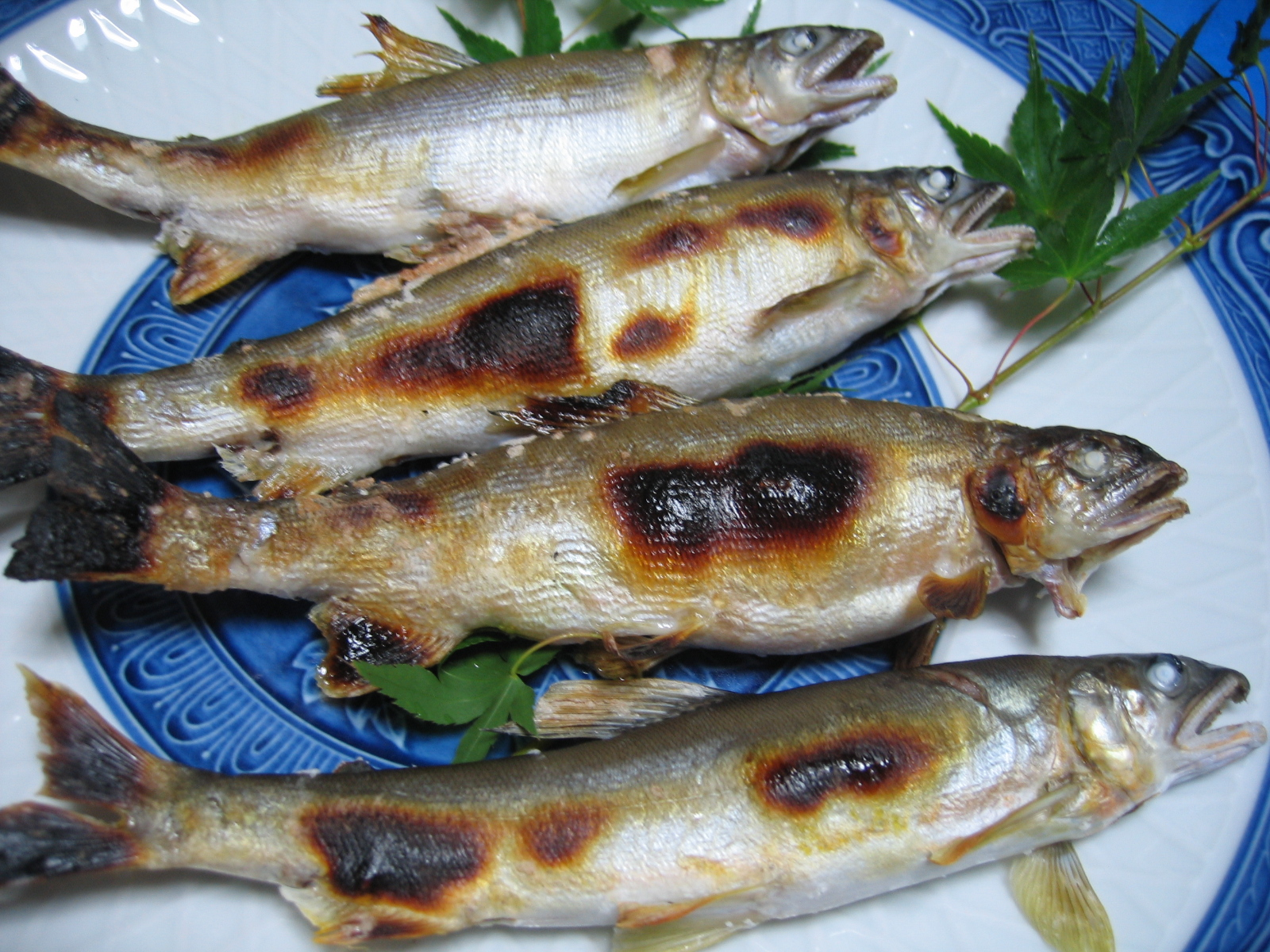
Ayu no shio yaki
(Ayu grilled with salt)

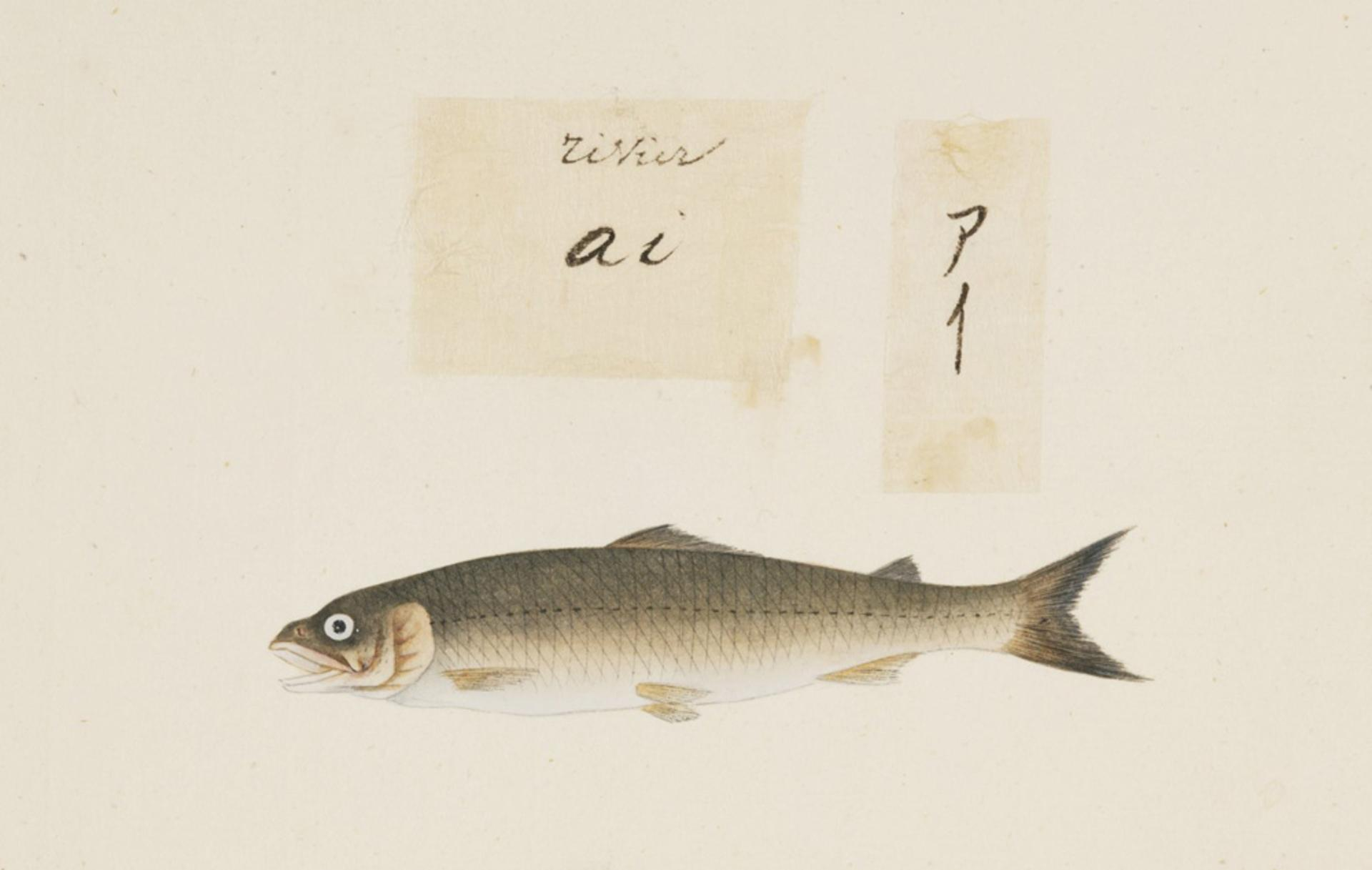
Watercolor illustration

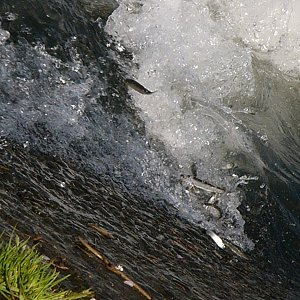
Swimming up a dam

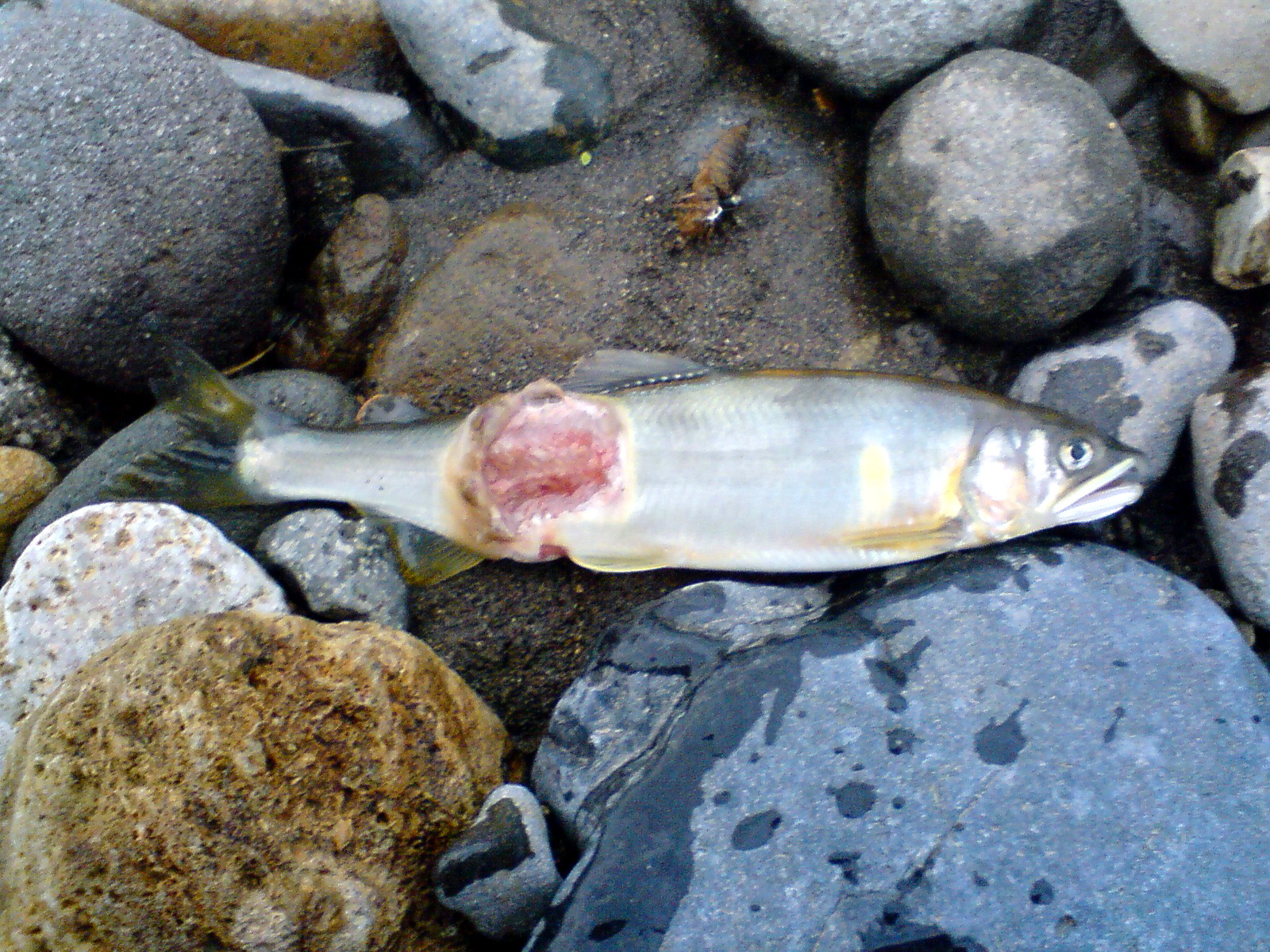
With cold water disease.

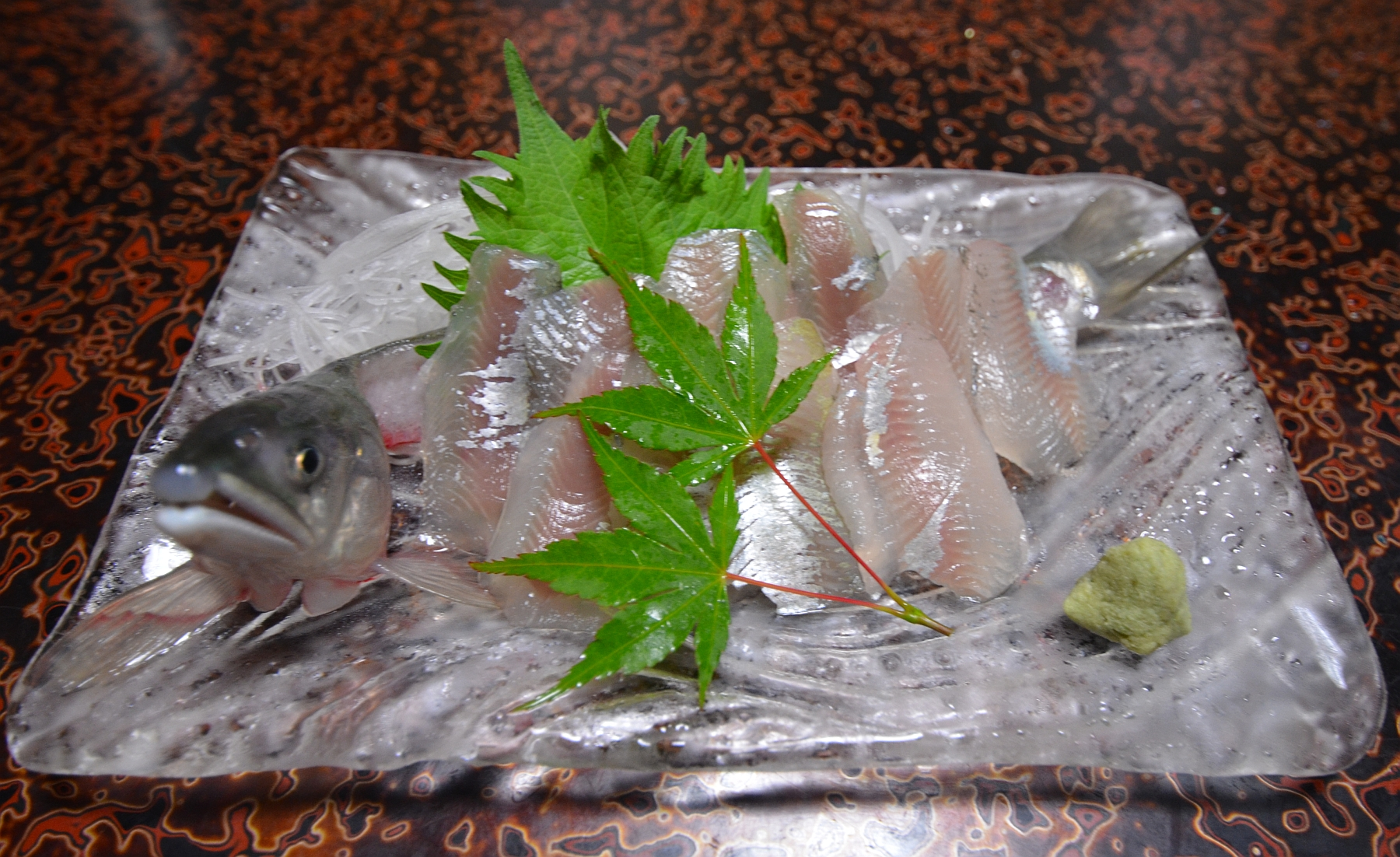
As sashimi

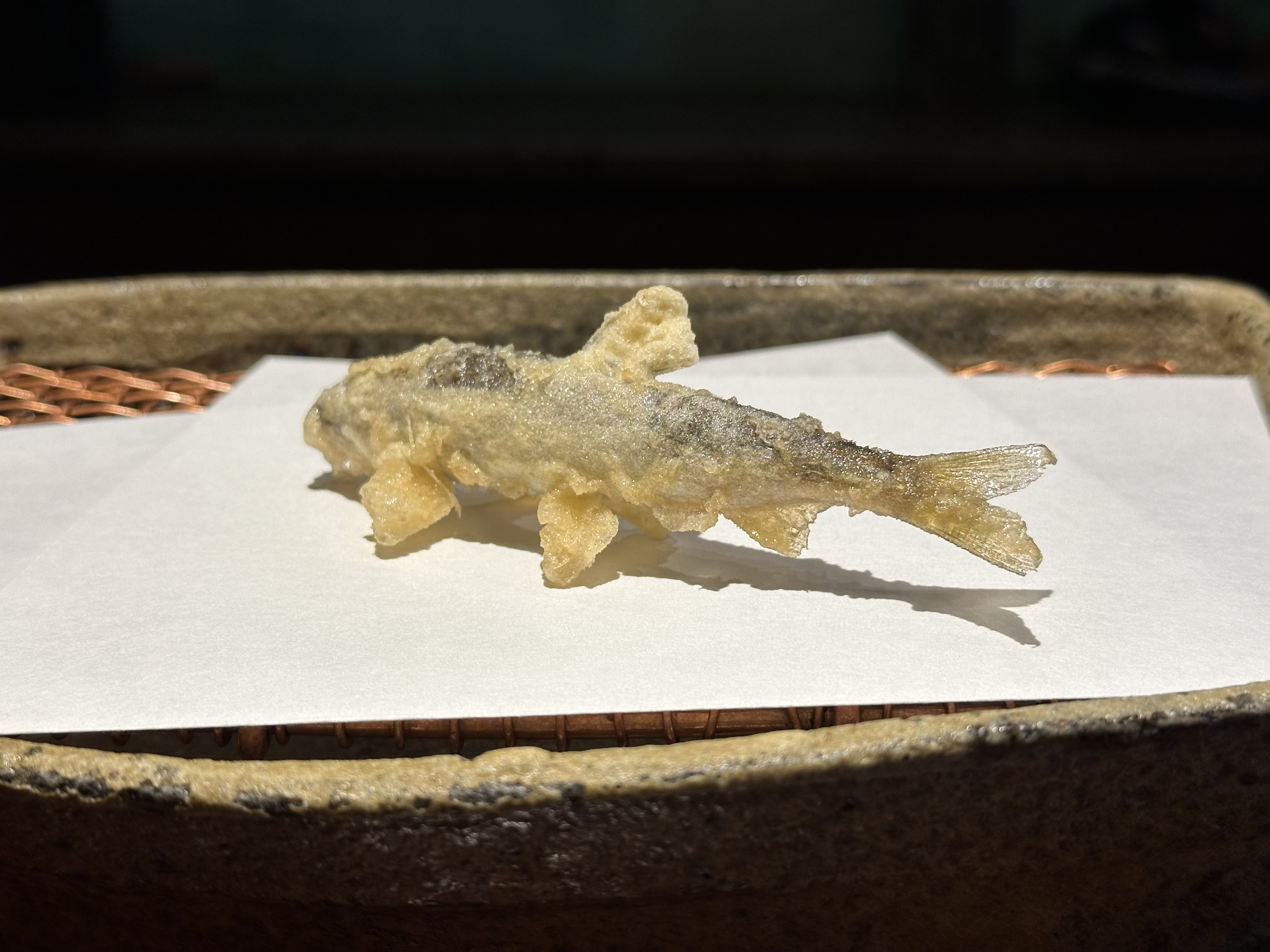
As tempura

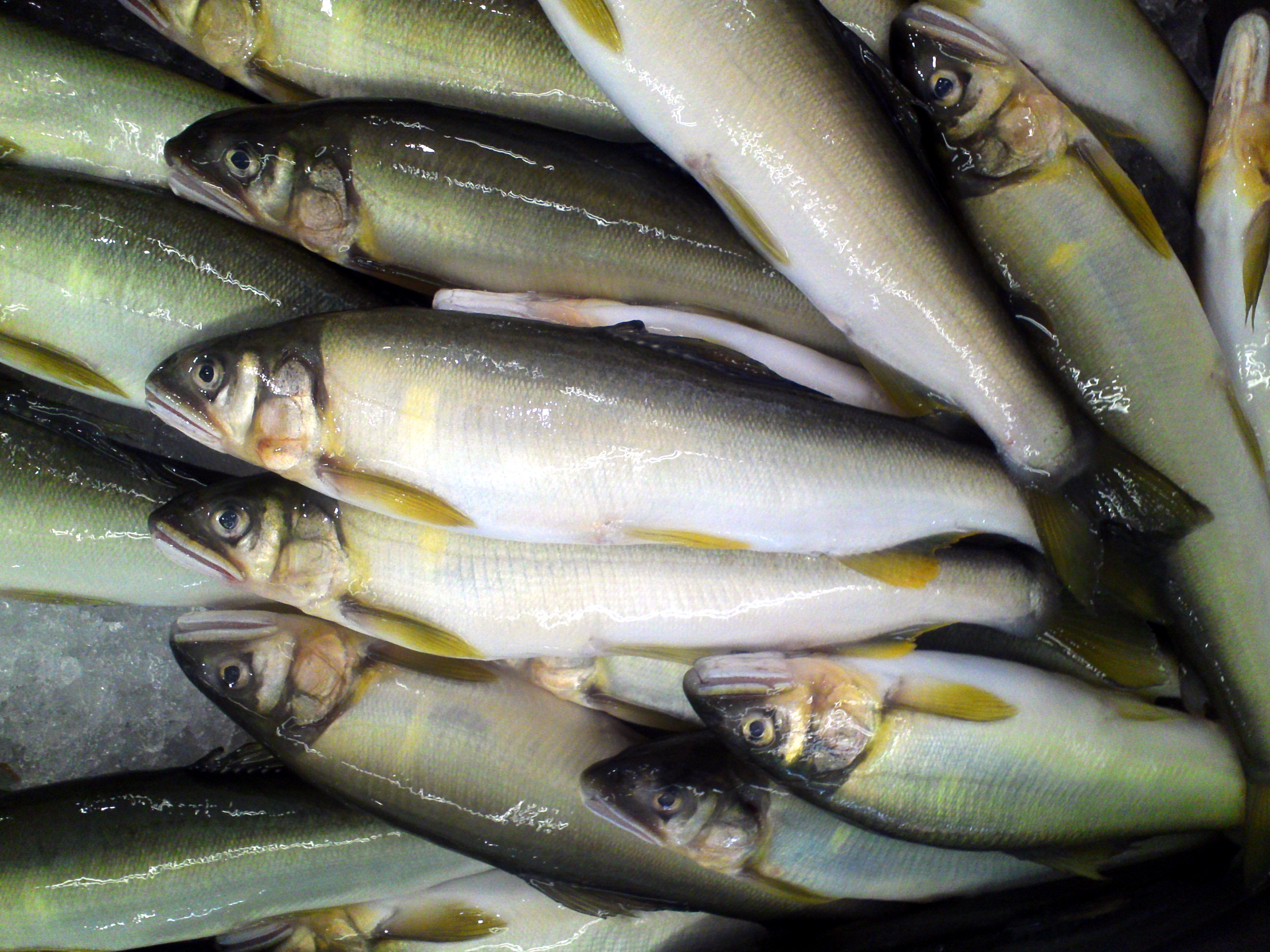
Farmed ayu

== See also ==
- Tai Ho Stream
