= McGraths Flat =

Paleontological site in New South Wales, Australia

McGraths Flat is an Australian research site containing fossils and other evidence of animals and plants that existed in Miocene Australia. Located in central New South Wales, specimens at the site are in an exceptional state of preservation, described in paleontology as a Konservat-Lagerstätten, deposited in unusual conditions that record microscopic details of soft tissues and delicate structures. Fossil evidence of animals with soft bodies, unlike the bones of mammals and reptiles, is rare in Australia, and discoveries at McGraths' Flat have revealed unknown species of invertebrates such as insects and spiders.

The site, near the town of Gulgong, is named for its discoverer, Nigel McGrath, a farmer who found the first fossils there in 2017. The degree of preservation at this Lagerstätte has been compared to the quality of that found at Crato Formation, Lake Eckfeld, and Libros. Other fossil sites in Australia, such as Riversleigh World Heritage Area, Bullock Creek and Alcoota, are rich in the skeletal remains of Miocene fauna, but none provide the diversity of organisms, their interactions, or exquisite detail found at this site. The finely layered fossiliferous strata is associated with permanent water, perhaps an oxbow lake, in a mesic rainforest, habitat that once dominated the continent. One theory of the rock's formation is that acidic soils released and transported dissolved Fe(II) from weathering basaltic bedrock into the depositional environment creating Ferricrete.

At the time of deposition of the fossil strata, from 16 to 11 million years ago, the site was a slow moving or still water body, perhaps a billabong. Along with fish, the fossilised remains of insects include an abundance of pupae and adult stages of aquatic species. Evidence of an isolated ecosystem at a stable and permanently wet site is supported by preliminary examination of taxa that includes midges.

List of named taxa form McGraths Flat
Taxon	Higher taxonomy	Reference
Laopsaltria ferruginosa	Hemiptera: Cicadidae	
Burbungoides gulgongensis	Hemiptera: Cicadidae	
Tithopsaltria titan	Hemiptera: Cicadidae	
Megamonodontium mccluskyi	Arachnida: Barychelidae	
Chaoborus abundans	Diptera: Chaoboridae	
Gleichenia nagalingumiae	Gleicheniales: Gleicheniaceae	
Neromantispa antiqua	Neuroptera: Mantispidae	
Ferrucornus gulgongensis	Coleoptera: Cerambycidae	
Ventiala beattiei	Coleoptera: Cerambycidae	
Baladi warru	Hymenoptera: Pergidae	
Ferruaspis brocksi	Osmeriformes: Ferruaspidae	
