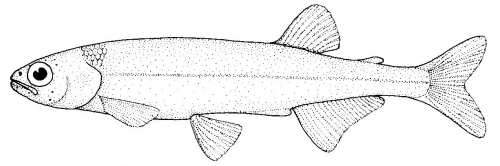
- New Zealand smelt, Retropinna retropinna

Scientific classification
- Kingdom: Animalia
- Phylum: Chordata
- Class: Actinopterygii
- Order: Osmeriformes
- Suborder: Retropinnoidei
- Family: Retropinnidae; Gill, 1862

Genera
- Prototroctes; Retropinna; Stokellia

Synonyms
- Prototroctidae

= Retropinnidae =

Retropinnidae Temporal range: Miocene–present

Family of fishes

The Retropinnidae are a family of bony fishes that contains the Southern Hemisphere smelts and graylings. They are the only members of the suborder Retropinnoidei. They are closely related to the northern smelts (Osmeroidei), which they greatly resemble, but not to the northern graylings (Thymallus). Species from this family are only found in southeastern Australia and New Zealand, although a fossil otolith suggests that they may have also inhabited southern South America during the Neogene. Although a few species are partly marine, most inhabit fresh or brackish water.

In the past, this family was allied with the galaxiids, with the latter also being treated as osmeriforms. However, more recent studies suggest that the galaxiids form their own order distinct from the osmeriforms.

The following taxa are placed in this family:

- Suborder Retropinnoidei
  - Family †Ferruaspidae
    - Genus †Ferruaspis
  - Family Retropinnidae
    - Genus ?†Navidadichthys
    - Subfamily Retropinninae
      - Genus Retropinna
    - Subfamily Prototroctinae
      - Genus Prototroctes
      - Genus Stokellia

The otolith-based fossil genus Navidadichthys is known from the Miocene-aged Navidad Formation of Chile. Its taxonomic identity is ambiguous, but if it represents a member of the Retropinnidae, it is the only member of this group known outside of Australasia. A basal relative of the Retropinnidae, the extinct freshwater family Ferruaspidae (containing the single genus Ferruaspis) has been identified from well-preserved remains from the Miocene of Australia.
