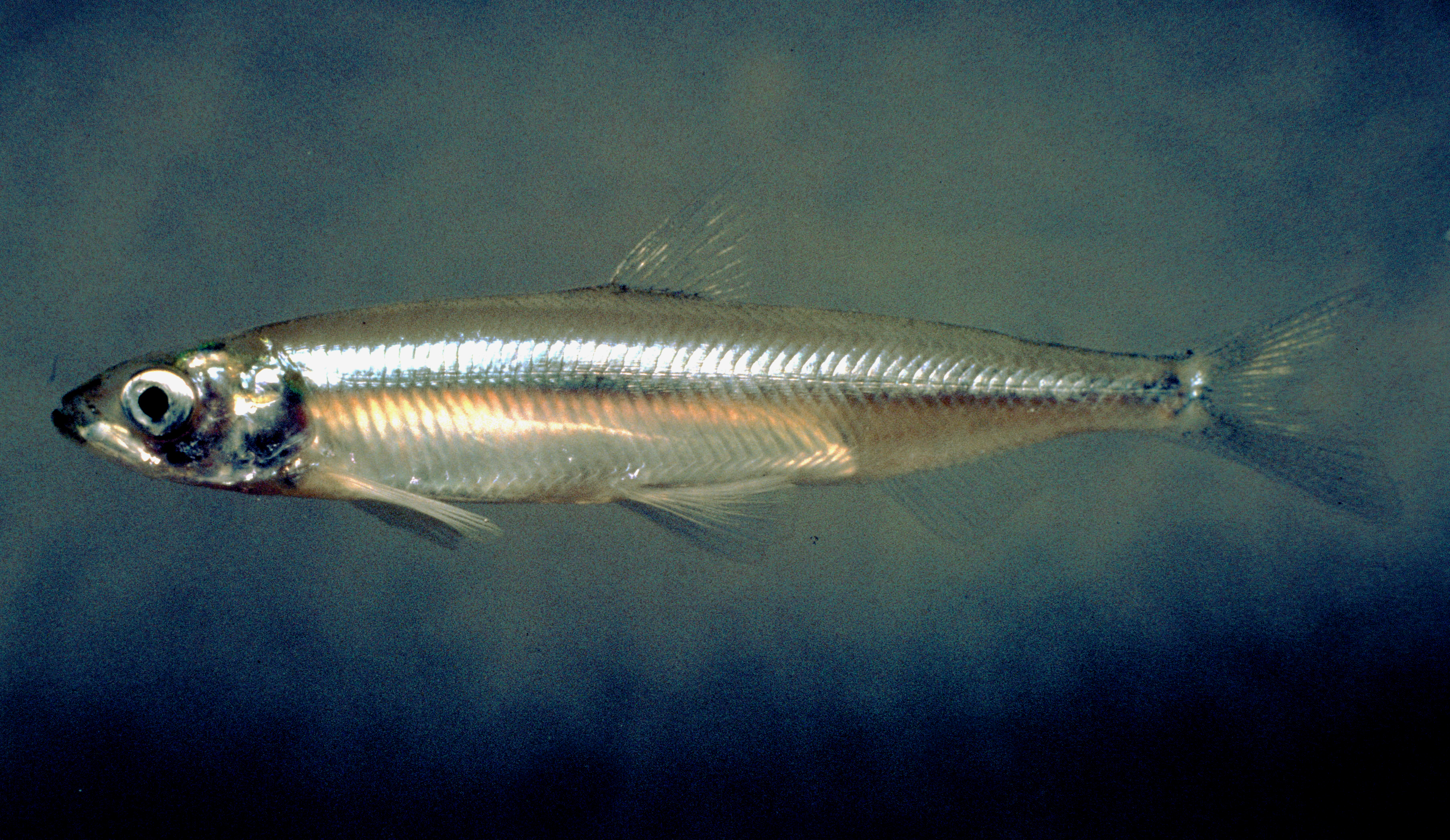
- Delta smelt, Hypomesus transpacificus (Osmeroidei: Osmeridae)

Scientific classification
- Kingdom: Animalia
- Phylum: Chordata
- Class: Actinopterygii
- Superorder: Osmeromorpha
- Order: Osmeriformes; Regan, 1913

Type species
- Osmerus eperlanus Linnaeus, 1758

Families
- ?†Spaniodontidae; Retropinnidae; †Ferruaspidae; Osmeridae; Plecoglossidae; Salangidae

= Osmeriformes =

Osmeriformes Temporal range: Late Paleocene–present

Order of fishes

The Osmeriformes /ɒsˈmɛrɪfɔːrmiːz/ are an order of ray-finned fish that includes the true or freshwater smelts and allies, such as the noodlefishes; they are also collectively called osmeriforms. They belong to the teleost superorder Protacanthopterygii, which also includes pike and salmon, among others. The order's name means "smelt-shaped", from Osmerus (the type genus) + the standard fish order suffix "-formes". It ultimately derives from Ancient Greek osmé (ὀσμή, "pungent smell") + Latin forma ("external form"), the former in reference to the characteristic aroma of the flesh of Osmerus.

In the classification used here, the order Osmeriformes contains two suborders, four families, some 17 genera, and about 52 species. The "marine" smelts and allies (e.g. the odd-looking barreleyes) were formerly included here as suborder Argentinoidei; they are now usually considered more distantly related than it was believed and treated as order Argentiniformes. When the marine smelts were included here, the subdivisions of the Osmeriformes were down-ranked by one. The galaxiids were also previously placed in this order, being treated as allied with the retropinnids, but are now known to represent their own, distinct order.

== Description and ecology ==
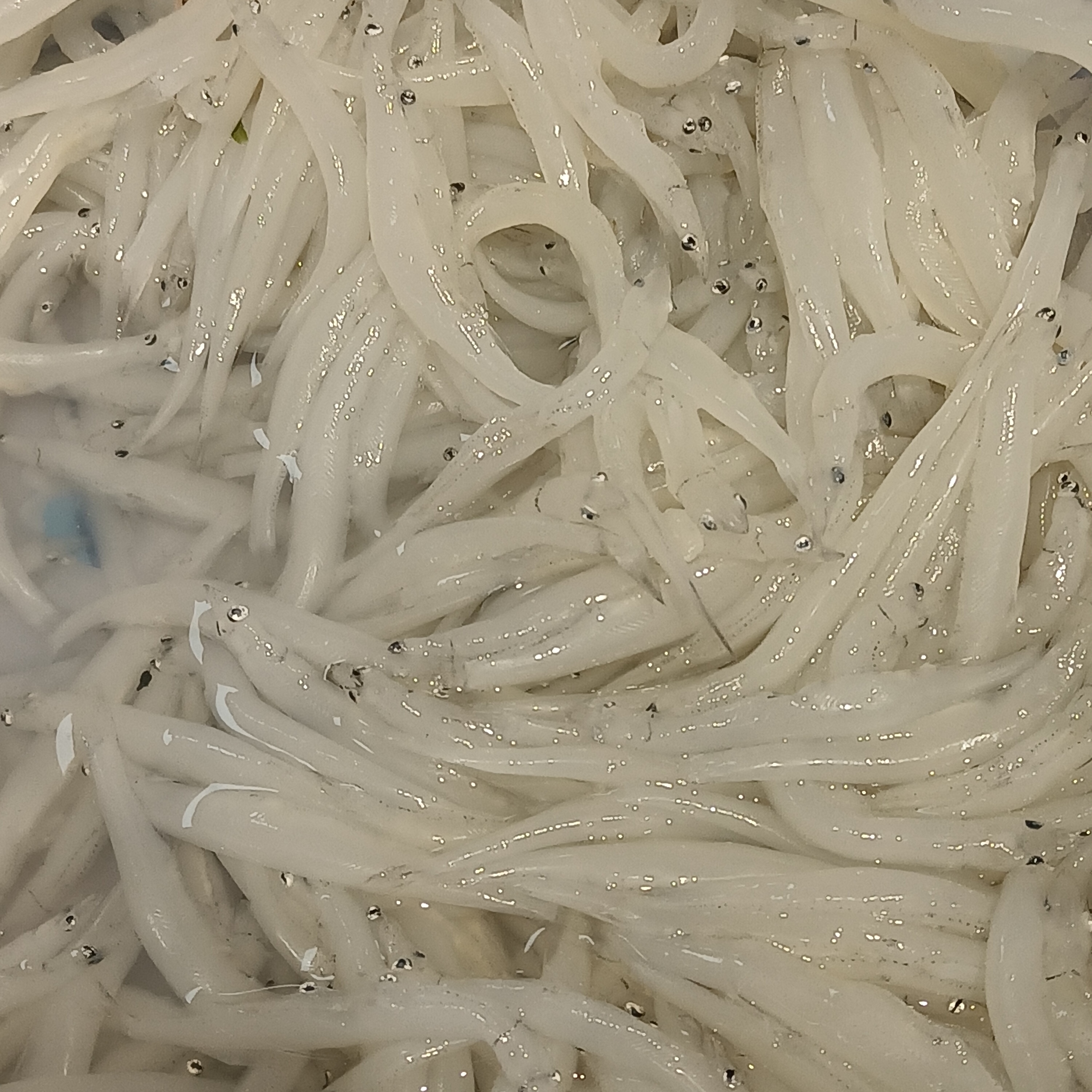
Noodlefish (Salangidae) are unusual osmeriforms that are commonly harvested

Osmeriformes are small to mid-sized slender fish. Their maxilla is usually included in the mouth's gape, and most of them have an adipose fin as is often found in the Protacanthopterygii. Their [pterosphenoid] usually has a ventral flange, and the vomer has a short posterior shaft. They have reduced or even missing articular and mesopterygoid teeth, and the basisphenoid and orbitosphenoid bones are entirely absent. Their scales lack radii.

Despite the term "freshwater smelts", the members of the Osmeriformes are generally marine, amphidromous or anadromous migrants. Even the sedentary freshwater species in this family are usually tolerant of considerable changes in salinity. Almost all osmeriforms spawn in fresh water, thus the marine species are generally anadromous. They are found in temperate oceans worldwide and in temperate freshwater of the Holarctic and around the South Pacific region; only a handful of species occur in tropical waters. The eggs are surrounded by an adhesive membrane.

== Systematics ==
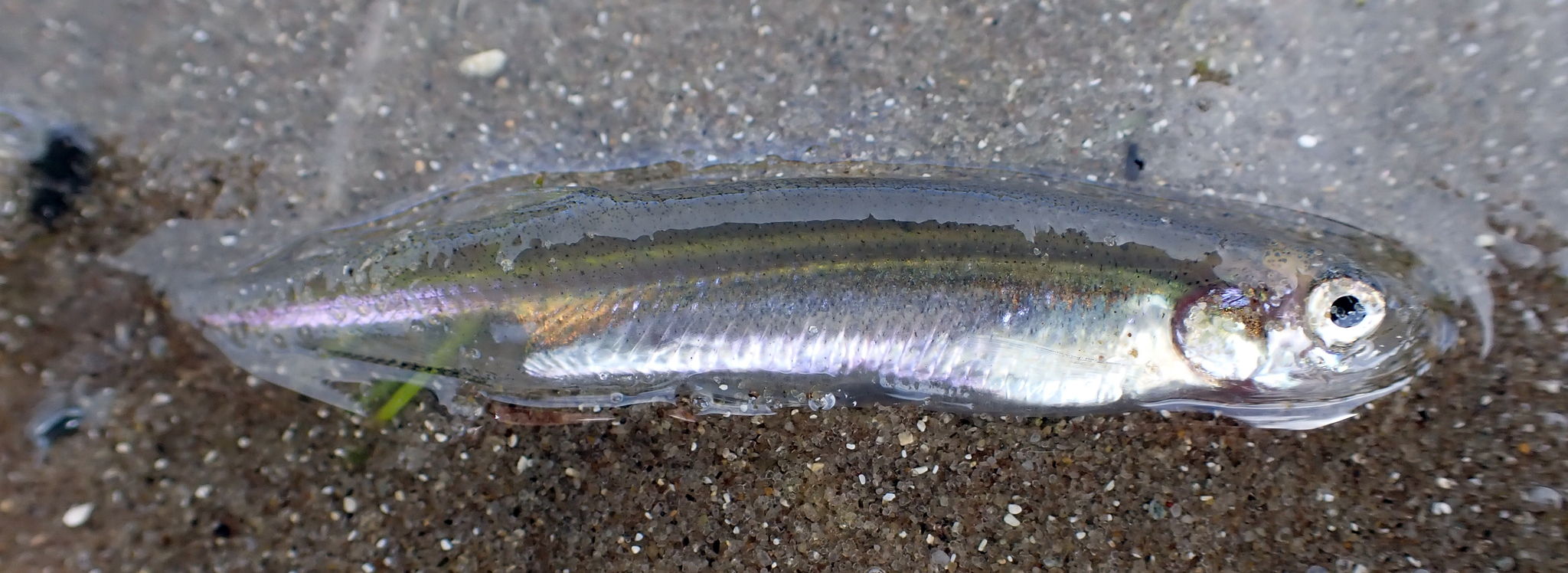
New Zealand smelt (Retropinna retropinna), one of the few species in the Retropinnidae

With the Argentiniformes, Alepocephaliformes, Galaxiiformes, and Lepidogalaxiiformes separated as distinct orders, the remaining Osmeriformes appear to be a monophyletic group. As protacanthopterygians, they are known to be related to the Salmoniformes (pikes and salmon). However, more recent studies incorporating anatomical and DNA sequence data suggest that their closest relatives are the deep-sea Stomiiformes.

The classification of the Osmeriformes as approached here is:

- Family ?†Spaniodontidae Jordan, 1905 (Late Cretaceous (Santonian) of Lebanon)
- Suborder Retropinnoidei
  - Family †Ferruaspidae McCurry et al., 2025 (Late Miocene of New South Wales, Australia)
  - Family Retropinnidae Gill, 1862 - Australian-New Zealand smelts and graylings (3 genera)
- Suborder Osmeroidei
  - Genus †Speirsaenigma Wilson & Williams, 1991 (Late Paleocene of Alberta, Canada)
  - Family Osmeridae Regan, 1913 - freshwater smelts, typical smelts (6 genera)
  - Family Plecoglossidae Bleeker, 1859 - ayu (1 genus)
  - Family Salangidae Bleeker, 1859 - noodlefishes, "icefish" (7 genera)

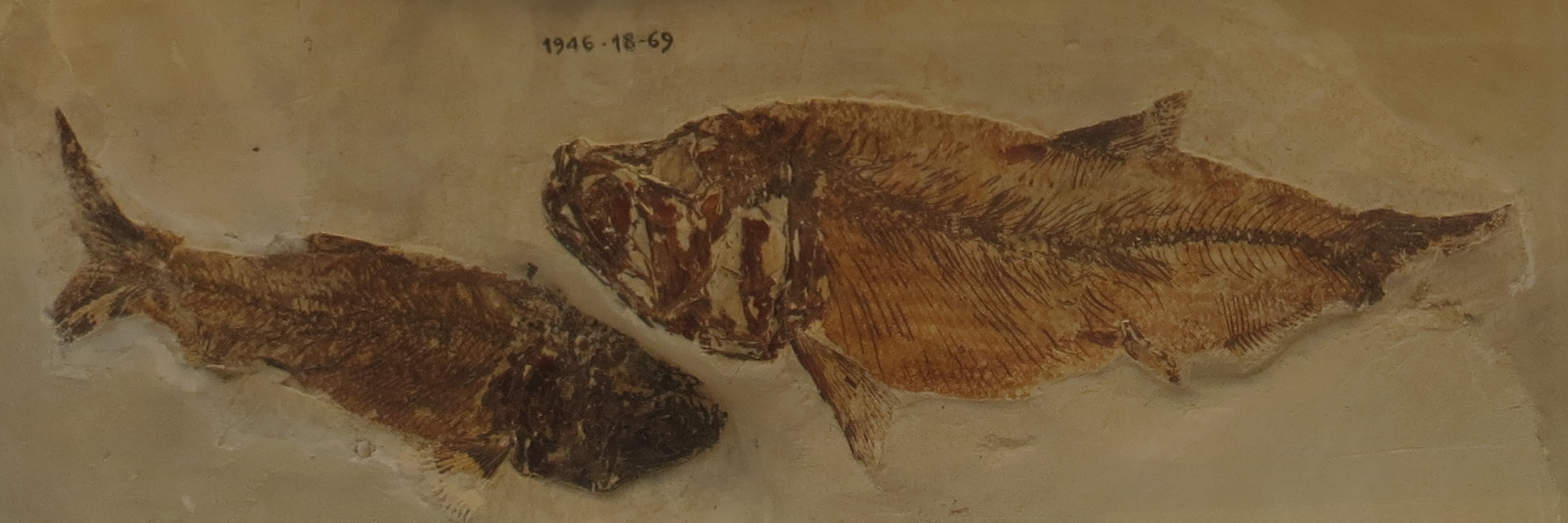
The Late Cretaceous-aged Spaniodon potentially represents an early osmeriform

A possible fossil osmeriform is Spaniodon, a piscivore from Late Cretaceous seas. The group originated probably somewhat earlier, but a Cretaceous age maybe about 110 million years ago or so is likely. The oldest definite osmeriform is Speirsaenigma from the Paleocene of Alberta, Canada, which was a relative of the modern ayu fish and appears to have been a freshwater species. In 2025, a new, extinct family of freshwater Southern Hemisphere smelt, the Ferruaspidae, was identified from the Miocene-aged McGraths Flat fossil site of Australia.

The families Galaxiidae and Lepidogalaxiidae were at one time placed together with Retropinnidae in the sub order Galaxoidei, however with new molecular studies they have been elevated to the ordinal level.
