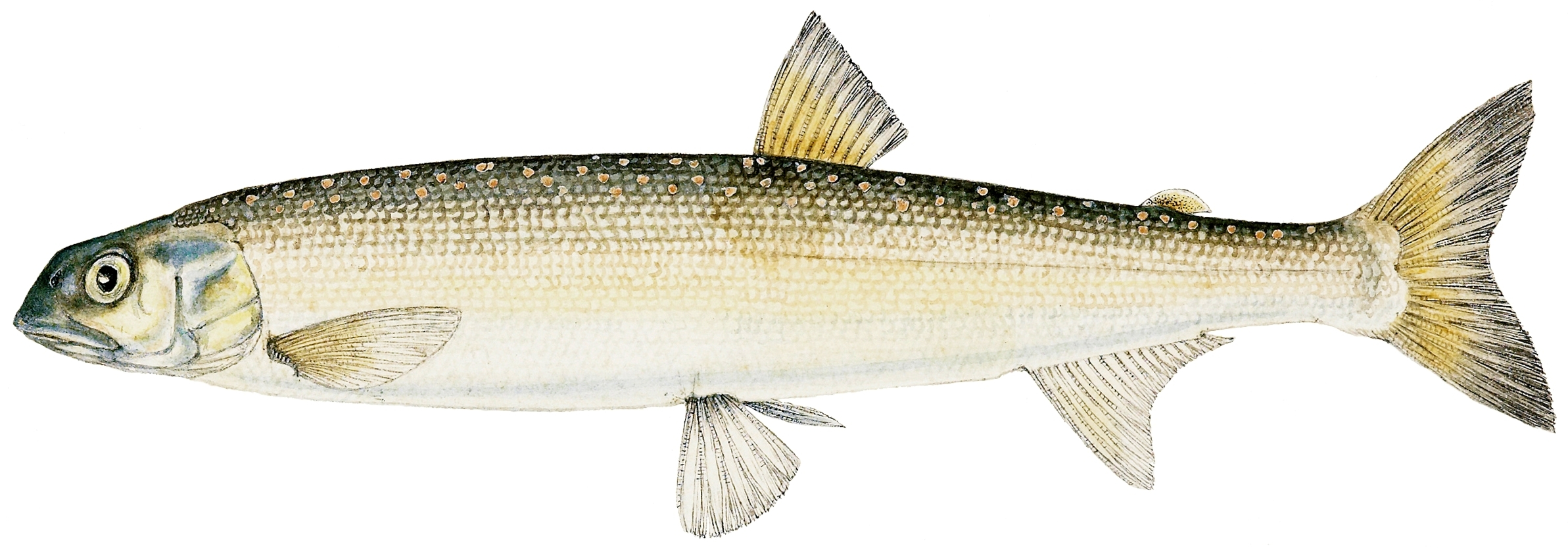

Conservation status
- Extinct (1927) (IUCN 3.1)

- Extinct (1927) (NZ TCS)

Scientific classification
- Kingdom: Animalia
- Phylum: Chordata
- Class: Actinopterygii
- Order: Osmeriformes
- Family: Retropinnidae
- Genus: Prototroctes
- Species: †P. oxyrhynchus

Binomial name
- †Prototroctes oxyrhynchus Günther, 1870
- Approximate known formal distribution (in red) of the New Zealand grayling on a map of New Zealand

= New Zealand grayling =

Species of fish

The New Zealand grayling (Prototroctes oxyrhynchus) is an extinct species of fish that was endemic to New Zealand. It was known to the Māori by many names, including pokororo, paneroro, kanae-kura, and most commonly, upokororo. The variety of names for the fish came from either multiple iwi, or to describe the fish at different periods of its life cycle. Even though this fish is named grayling, it is not related to the 'typical' or 'true' graylings of Europe and America (genus Thymallus), lacking the large dorsal fins true graylings are characterised by. It is, however, closely related to the Australian grayling (P. maraena). The New Zealand grayling was an amphidromous species, migrating between freshwater and saltwater during different seasons as well as stages in their life cycle. The last sighting of the New Zealand grayling was in 1929, and it was declared extinct in 2018.

== Taxonomy ==
The New Zealand grayling, previously part of the family Prototroctidae, is now part of the family Retropinnidae which contains smelts and graylings found in the southern hemisphere. Previously, smelts and southern graylings were classed into two separate families, Prototroctidae for graylings and Retropinnidae for southern smelts, however, now all six species under these families are classed in Retropinnidae. The fish is part of the genus Prototroctes, which contains two species, the New Zealand grayling (P. oxyrhynchus) and the Australian grayling (P. maraena).

The New Zealand grayling likely diverged from the Australian grayling during the mid-Miocene, about 14 million years ago. Two slightly older fossil Prototroctes species, P. modestus and P. vertex, are known from the early Miocene-aged St. Bathans Fauna of New Zealand, exclusively from fossil otoliths. Their relationship to P. oxyrhynchus, the only Prototroctes to have inhabited New Zealand into historical times, is unknown, as the specimens of P. oxyrhynchus lack any otoliths due to their preservation methods. Two complete fossil skeletons of an indeterminate Prototroctes have also been identified from the mid-Pleistocene of New Zealand, and these could potentially represent fossil remains of P. oxyrhynchus.

== Description ==
The New Zealand grayling was a medium-sized fish which, when matured, measured between 30–45 cm (12–18 in) in length and slender in shape with the presence of an adipose fin. As an amphidromous fish, during their migration, it was found that graylings, originally silvery in colour, would darken to a grey or brown, and turn occasionally gold, while the underbelly remained light.

=== Dentition ===
The dentition of the fish comprises a blunt and rounded snout, with the upper jaw containing a single row of long, blunt teeth that were situated close together forming a comb-like structure. The lower jaw, which contains another single row of smaller and sharper teeth, is slightly shorter than the upper jaw, and less rounded, forming a point that fits just inside the row of teeth on the upper jaw.

=== Diet ===
The dentition and digestive system of the New Zealand grayling suggests the fish was omnivorous, feeding on both aquatic insect larvae such as caddisflies, and plants such as waterweeds growing on the rocks of riverbeds. The fish is suspected to have been herbivorous at times.

== Distribution ==
The New Zealand grayling was widely distributed throughout both the North and South Islands of New Zealand throughout the 1800s; however the range of the fish decreased to more isolated parts of New Zealand in the 20th century, such as some streams in the East Cape, Wairarapa and Otaki districts on the North Island and on the west coast of the South Island. It was found in freshwater rivers and streams during autumn and winter, and migrated to New Zealand's surrounding seas in early spring. The fish is believed to have spawned in freshwater rivers before migrating to the sea and returning to freshwater to reproduce.

== History ==
The New Zealand grayling was often hunted by Māori. A traditional way the Māori people hunted the New Zealand grayling was by using a basket trap known as a hīnaki, lodged in a river to capture fish swimming downstream. The traps were often left overnight, so by morning, fish that were guided into the trap by the mānuka brush walls would be caught at the top of the tapered "V", not being able to swim back against the current to avoid being caught. This method of catching the fish was effective as it allowed dozens of fish to be captured at a single time. Another method involved two parties, one group startling the fish by beating the water with sticks, and another waiting downstream with nets.

The fish was abundant in the 19th Century. It was prized by early European settlers, unlike many other, and it became a sporting fish. Hundreds of graylings were often caught at once. The first declines in fish numbers were noted in the 1870s, and by the 1880s the New Zealand grayling was no longer found in most rivers. The population decreased so much by the 1900s that shoals would be reported on in newspapers. The last confirmed sighting of the fish being in 1923, when Peter Buck asked Māori living in the Waiapu Valley to teach him traditional fishing methods.

In 1951, some years after the last sighting, the species was given full legal protection by the Freshwater Fisheries Regulations. It is the only New Zealand native freshwater fish ever to be protected. In August 2018, the New Zealand Department of Conservation classified the New Zealand grayling as "Extinct" under the New Zealand Threat Classification System.

== Threats and extinction ==
The cause for the extinction of the New Zealand grayling is only speculated on, as the fish went extinct around the 1920s. However, multiple sources note that there was not a single cause for the extinction, but multiple subtle factors, which when combined, led to the abrupt disappearance of the fish which was once in abundance.

Being an amphidromous species and spending part of its life in freshwater rivers and streams, the New Zealand grayling was at risk of population decline and extinction due to the fragility of freshwater ecosystems. Deforestation has been identified as a process that threatens freshwater systems as runoff can lead to habitat degradation, causing erosion and increased river sedimentation. Another threat to freshwater systems is pollution, which poses a great threat to organisms confined to smaller waterways.

One of the factors believed to have contributed to the extinction of the New Zealand grayling include the theory of source-sink dynamics; rivers and streams that supply an optimal habitat for ecosystems are known as sources, whereas those which do not provide the same level of environmental characteristics due to pollution, overfishing, or introduced species, are known as sinks. As the presence of sink rivers increased through pollution, caused by industrial development, increased, the availability of source rivers decreased accordingly. When at sea the New Zealand grayling faced little to no threat from humans, but when migrating back to freshwater rivers or streams faced the threat of entering a sink river, where breeding and inhabiting conditions are unfavorable. As the fish were known to migrate in large shoals, if migration to a sink river occurred, a significant proportion of the population would either find it difficult to reproduce, which would decrease the amount of offspring in the next age cohort or generation, or simply die off, which would impact their own cohort. The increase in sink rivers therefore posed a significant threat to the amphidromous species, as the availability of source habitats decreased and turned to habitats with less than favorable conditions.

Another factor assessed to be a cause for the extinction of the species is the harvesting of the fish. Along with the Māori people hunting the New Zealand grayling, the settlement of the Europeans resulted in an increase of fishing. The increase in hunting for the fish, as it was in abundance, led to a decline in the population and eventually extinction, as the reproductive capacity of it was inundated.

The final factor believed to have triggered the rapid decline and subsequent extinction of the population of the New Zealand grayling is the effects of introducing various trout species; brown trout were introduced into the southern oceanic regions during the 1860s including New Zealand in 1867, and rainbow trout were introduced in 1883. The introduction of both brown and rainbow trout affected endemic species, such as the New Zealand grayling, through direct predation and competition for food and habitat. The non-native oomycete pathogen Saprolegnia parasitica vectored by introduced trout may have also played a strong role in the extinction of the New Zealand grayling, particularly in waters that, with the exception of trout introduction, appeared remote and undisturbed. S. parasitica is inevitably introduced with salmonids and is strongly implicated in very severe fish kills of the closely related Australian grayling soon after trout introduction in Australia.
