= List of rice diseases =

Rice disease

This article is a list of diseases of rice (Oryza sativa). Diseases have historically been one of the major causes of rice shortages.

== Bacterial diseases ==
Bacterial diseases
Bacterial blight	Xanthomonas oryzae pv. oryzae = X. campestris pv. oryzae
Bacterial leaf streak	Xanthomonas oryzae pv. oryzicola
Foot rot	Dickeya dadantii/Erwinia chrysanthemi
Grain rot	Burkholderia glumae
Pecky rice (kernel spotting)	Damage by bacteria (see also under fungal and miscellaneous diseases)
Sheath brown rot	Pseudomonas fuscovaginae

== Fungal diseases ==
Fungal diseases
Aggregate sheath	Ceratobasidium oryzae-sativae Rhizoctonia oryzae-sativae [anamorph]
Black horse riding	Curvularia lunata Cochliobolus lunatus [teleomorph]
Blast (leaf, neck [rotten neck], nodal and collar)	Pyricularia grisea = Pyricularia oryzae Magnaporthe grisea [teleomorph]
Brown spot	Cochliobolus miyabeanus Bipolaris oryzae [anamorph]
Crown sheath rot	Gaeumannomyces graminis
Downy mildew	Sclerophthora macrospora
Eyespot	Drechslera gigantea
False smut	Ustilaginoidea virens
Kernel smut	Tilletia barclayana = Neovossia horrida
Leaf smut	Entyloma oryzae
Leaf scald	Microdochium oryzae = Rhynchosporium oryzae
Narrow brown leaf spot	Cercospora janseana = Cercospora oryzae Sphaerulina oryzina [teleomorph]
Pecky rice (kernel spotting)	Damage by many fungi including Cochliobolus miyabeanus Curvularia spp. Fusarium spp. Microdochium oryzae Sarocladium oryzae and other fungi.
Root rots	Fusarium spp. Pythium spp. P. dissotocum P. spinosum
~~Rust~~	Rice is immune to rusts.
Seedling blight	Cochliobolus miyabeanus Curvularia spp. Fusarium spp. Rhizoctonia solani Athelia rolfsii and other pathogenic fungi.
Sheath blight	Rhizoctonia solani
Sheath rot	Sarocladium oryzae = Acrocylindrium oryzae
Sheath spot	Waitea oryzae
Stackburn (Alternaria leaf spot)	Alternaria padwickii
Stem rot	Magnaporthe salvinii Sclerotium oryzae [synanamorph]
Water-mold (seed-rot and seedling disease)	Achlya conspicua A. klebsiana Fusarium spp. Pythium spp. P. dissotocum P. spinosum

== Viruses ==
- Rice black-streaked dwarf virus
- Rice bunchy stunt virus
- Rice dwarf virus
- Rice gall dwarf virus
- Rice giallume virus
- Rice grassy stunt virus
- Rice hoja blanca tenuivirus
- Rice necrosis mosaic virus
- Rice ragged stunt virus
- Rice stripe necrosis virus
- Rice stripe tenuivirus
- Rice transitory yellowing virus
- Rice tungro bacilliform virus - see Tungro below
- Rice tungro spherical virus - see Tungro below
- Rice yellow mottle virus

== Miscellaneous diseases and disorders ==
Miscellaneous diseases and disorders
Alkalinity or salt damage	Excessive salt concentration in soil or water
Bronzing	Zinc deficiency
Cold injury	Low temperatures
Panicle blight	Cause undetermined
golden apple snail	Pomacea canaliculata
Pecky rice (kernel spotting)	Feeding injury by rice stink bug, Oebalus pugnax
Rice tungro	Complex virus (Rice tungro bacilliform virus and Rice tungro spherical virus) transmitted by green leafhopper Nephotettix spp.)
Straighthead	Arsenic induced, unknown physiological disorder
White tip (see nematodes)	Aphelenchoides besseyi

== See also ==
- Category:Insect pests of rice
- List of rice varieties
