= Alma Joslyn Whiffen-Barksdale =

American mycologist

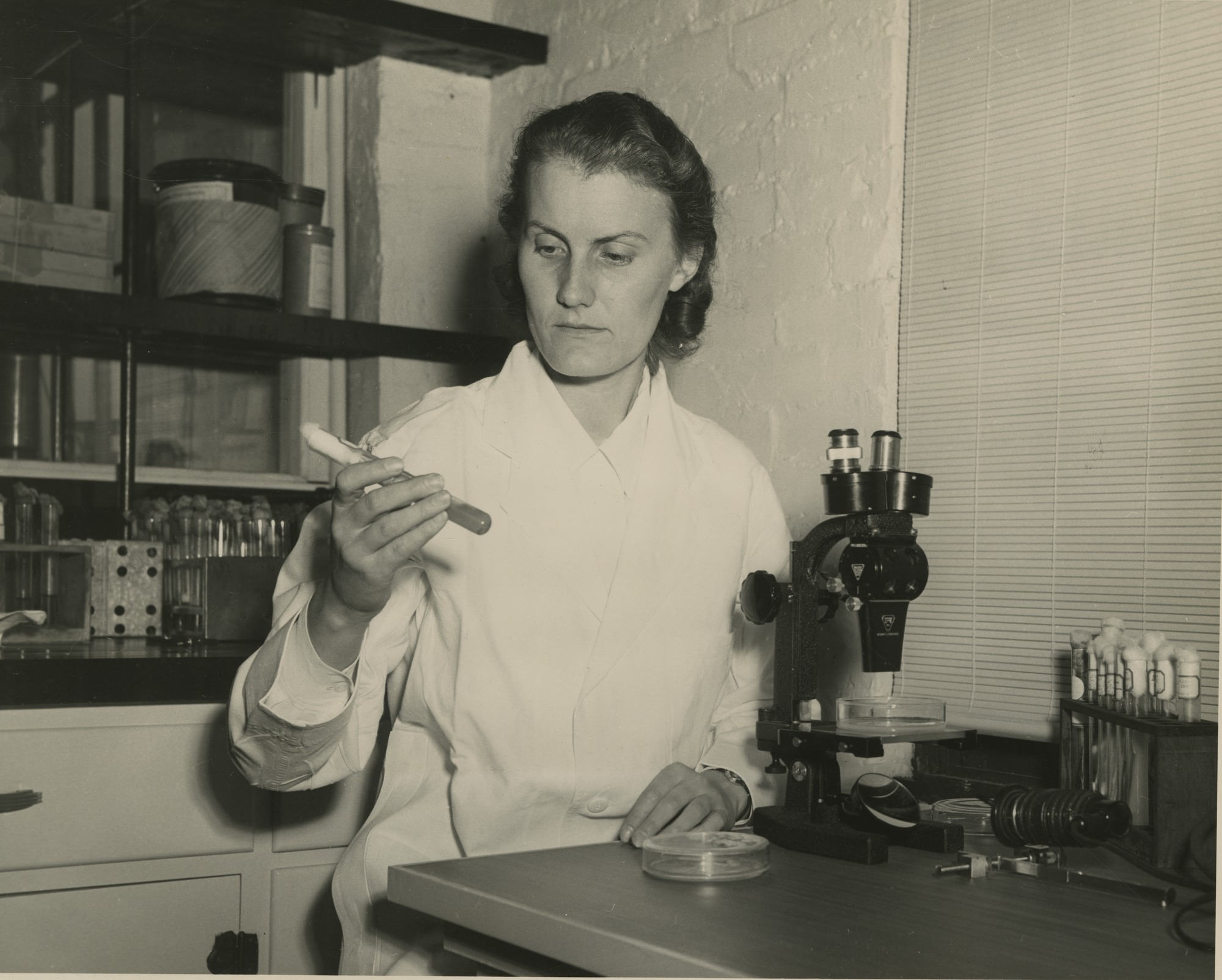
- Born: 1916; Hammonton, New Jersey
- Died: 1981 (aged 64–65)
- Education: University of North Carolina
- Awards: Guggenheim Fellowship
- Scientific career
- Fields: Botany; Mycology
- Workplaces: Upjohn; New York Botanical Garden

Alma Joslyn Whiffen-Barksdale (October 25, 1916 – July 5, 1981) was an American mycologist who discovered cycloheximide. She was born in Hammonton, New Jersey. She received a bachelor's degree from Maryville College (1937). During her time at Maryville College, she was an assistant in biology and botany, the Nature Club President, and received honor roll all four years. Her Masters (botany, 1939) and Ph.D. (botany and mycology, 1941) were earned at the University of North Carolina. In 1941–42. She was a Carnegie Fellow, and in 1951, she was a Guggenheim Fellow. Barksdale worked at the Department of Antibiotic Research of the Upjohn Company of Kalamazoo, Michigan (1943–52) and at the New York Botanical Garden. Barksdale became a foundational figure in the study of Achlya, a genus of aquatic fungi with a unique reproductive system, while working at the New York Botanical Garden; The Mycological Society of America and the Achlya Newsletter, a publication of continuing research on Achlya, both published retrospectives on her life and work following her death in 1981.

== Research career ==
=== Graduate and post-doctoral work (1939–1943) ===
At the University of North Carolina (at Chapel Hill), and later Harvard University, Barksdale conducted graduate and post-doctoral research on the aquatic fungi classes Oomycetes and Chytridiomycetes. She contributed to the development of methods for isolating and cultivating aquatic fungi, the accurate description of their nutritional needs, and a previously unknown sexual life cycle in the aquatic parasite order Blastocladiales. She received a Carnegie Fellowship (at North Carolina) and a National Research Council Fellowship (at Harvard) for her research, and her work during that time resulted in several academic publications. Some specimens collected by Barksdale can still be found in the Herbarium at the University of North Carolina at Chapel Hill.

=== Department of Antibiotic Research at Upjohn Company, Kalamazoo, Michigan (1943–1952) ===
In 1943, Barksdale was hired by the Upjohn Company in Kalamazoo MI, as a professional mycologist. While there, she discovered the chemical cycloheximide (trade name Actidione), an anti-fungal and anti-bacterial agent produced by the bacterium Streptomyces griseus. The chemical found initial use as a fungicide for plants affected by fungal pathogens, but is now primarily used for experimental purposes. In 1951, a year before leaving Upjohn, she became a John Simon Guggenheim Fellow at Stanford University. In 1952, she married microbiologist Lane Barksdale and left the Upjohn Company, after which she and her new husband spent a year conducting research projects in Paris.

=== New York Botanical Garden (1955–1974) ===
In 1955, Barksdale became a research associate at the New York Botanical Garden and returned to the study of aquatic fungi. From 1955 to 1961, she expanded existing research on the species Achlya bisexualis, focusing on the fungus' unique sexual reproductive hormones. It had been previously concluded by fellow mycologist, Dr.John Raper, that the development of sexual organs in A. bisexualis was mediated by the exchange of hormones between the male and female strains of the fungus. Over the course of ten years of research, Barksdale discovered and isolated the sex hormone antheridiol: a steroid released by the female strains of A. bisexualis, which stimulates the growth of antheridia when introduced to male strains of the fungus. Antheridiol also stimulates the release of a second hormone, when introduced to the male strains, which promoted the growth of oogonia in the female strains. Her discoveries sparked a new wave of interest in the Achlya genus as a research subject over the following decades, and she and Dr. Raper are jointly considered the primary establishing figures in Achlya research, according to the retrospective on her life published in the 1981 issue of Achlya Newsletter.

In 1960, Alma and Lane spent a year conducting research in Japan, at the Universities of Kyoto and Osaka.

In 1961, Barksdale was promoted to senior research associate at the New York Botanical Garden, and from 1972 to 1974 she held the position of senior botanist at the garden, after which she retired due to failing health.

== See also ==
- List of mycologists
- Cycloheximide
- Achlya bisexualis
