= UDN =

UDN can stand for:

- National Democratic Union (Brazil) (União Democrática Nacional), a political party that existed in Brazil between 1945 and 1965
- Univision Deportes Network, a Spanish-language sports channel in the United States
- Ulcerative dermal necrosis, a disease of salmon and trout
- United Daily News, a Taiwanese newspaper
- IATA airport code for Codroipo civil airport in Italy
- Unique Device Name of the UPnP Device Architecture
- Undiagnosed Diseases Network, an NIH-funded study of intractable medical conditions that have eluded diagnosis
- University of Da Nang, a public university system in Vietnam
