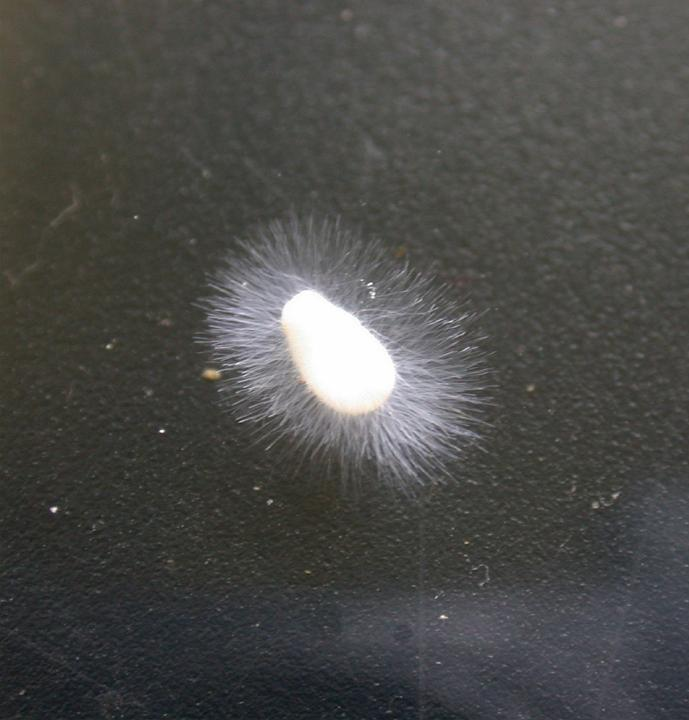
- Mainly Achlya sp. Isolated from small stream around rice field. Incubated in room temperature on hemp seed

Scientific classification
- Domain: Eukaryota
- Clade: Sar
- Clade: Stramenopiles
- Division: Oomycota
- Class: Saprolegniomycetes
- Order: Saprolegniales
- Family: Saprolegniaceae
- Genus: Achlya

= Achlya =

Genus of single-celled organisms

Achlya is a genus of oomycete (water mold), in the family Saprolegniaceae. The genus includes several plant pathogens including Achlya conspicua and Achlya klebsiana. Unlike many other microorganisms, cell expansion is governed by changes in cell wall strength rather than changes in osmotic pressure. The genome of Achlya hypogyna has been sequenced and can be accessed on public online databases, for example on the NCBI website (National Center for Biotechnology Information).

The genus was first circumscribed in Nova Acta Phys.-Med. Acad. Caes. Leop.-Carol. Nat. Cur. vol.11 on page 514 in 1823 by Christian Gottfried Daniel Nees von Esenbeck.

The type species is Achlya prolifera.

The genus name of Achlya is named after Achlys, who in the Hesiodic Shield of Heracles, is one of the figures depicted on Heracles' shield, perhaps representing the personification of sorrow.

Several Achyla spp. are pathogens of rice seedlings.

== Species ==
As accepted by Species Fungorum;

- Achlya abortispora B. Paul & El Andr. (2006)
- Achlya abortiva Coker & Braxton (1926)
- Achlya achlyoides (Coker) T.W. Johnson & R.L. Seym. (2005)
- Achlya ambisexualis Raper (1939)
- Achlya ambispora Steciow (2001)
- Achlya americana Humphrey (1893)
- Achlya androcomposita Hamid (1942)
- Achlya anomala Steciow & Marano (2008)
- Achlya aquatica Dayal & J. Thakur (1969)
- Achlya bisexualis Coker & Couch (1927)
- Achlya bispora (Couch) Langsam (1986)
- Achlya bonariensis Beroqui (1969)
- Achlya caroliniana Coker (1910)
- Achlya colorata Pringsh. (1882)
- Achlya conspicua Coker (1923)
- Achlya crenulata Ziegler (1948)
- Achlya debaryana Humphrey (1893)
- Achlya diffusa J.V. Harv. ex T.W. Johnson (1956)
- Achlya dubia Coker (1923)
- Achlya echinulata Beroqui (1969)
- Achlya flagellata Coker (1923)
- Achlya flexuosa Nagai (1931)
- Achlya formosana Chiou & H.S. Chang (1976)
- Achlya fuegiana Steciow (2001)
- Achlya glomerata Coker (1912)
- Achlya haehneliana Cejp (1934)
- Achlya heterosexualis Whiffen (1965)
- Achlya imperfecta Coker (1923)
- Achlya inflata Coker & Braxton (1927)
- Achlya intricata Beneke (1948)
- Achlya kamatii Date (1972)
- Achlya kashyapia Chaudhuri & Kochhar (1935)
- Achlya klebsiana Pieters (1915)
- Achlya lobata Ziegler & Gilpin (1954)
- Achlya michiganensis T.W. Johnson (1950)
- Achlya orion Coker & Couch (1920)
- Achlya oryzae S. Ito & Nagai (1931)
- Achlya oviparvula A.L. Rogers & Beneke (1962)
- Achlya pacifica J.V. Harv. (1942)
- Achlya papillosa Humphrey (1893)
- Achlya primoachlya (Coker & Couch) T.W. Johnson & R.L. Seym. (2005)
- Achlya prolifera Nees (1823)
- Achlya proliferoides Coker (1923)
- Achlya pseudoachlyoides (Beneke) T.W. Johnson & R.L. Seym. (2005)
- Achlya pseudoradiosa A.L. Rogers & Beneke (1962)
- Achlya racemosa Hildebr. (1867)
- Achlya radiosa Maurizio (1899)
- Achlya regularis Coker & J. Leitn. (1938)
- Achlya robusta Steciow & Elíades (2002)
- Achlya rodrigueziana F.T. Wolf (1941)
- Achlya sparrowii Reischer (1949)
- Achlya spiracaulis T.W. Johnson (1950)
- Achlya spiralis B. Paul & Steciow (2008)
- Achlya subterranea Coker & Braxton (1926)
- Achlya truncatiformis M.W. Dick & Mark A. Spencer (2002)
- Achlya tuberculata Ziegler (1950)
- Achlya turfosa Johannes (1950)

Former species; (all are Saprolegniaceae family)

- A. abortiva f. normalis Coker (1927) = Achlya abortiva
- A. acadiensis C.L. Moore (1912) = Newbya androgyna,
- A. ambisexualis var. abjointa Raper (1939) = Achlya ambisexualis
- A. ambisexualis var. gracilis Raper (1939) = Achlya ambisexualis
- A. americana var. cambrica Trow (1899) = Achlya americana
- A. americana var. megasperma Crooks (1937) = Achlya americana
- A. americana var. megasperma Crooks ex Cejp (1959) = Achlya americana
- A. androgyna (W. Archer) T.W. Johnson & R.L. Seym. (2005) = Newbya androgyna
- A. apiculata de Bary (1888) = Newbya apiculata
- A. apiculata var. forbesiana Cejp (1959) = Newbya apiculata
- A. apiculata var. prolifica Coker & Couch (1923) = Newbya apiculata
- A. benekei J.S. Furtado (1965) = Protoachlya benekei
- A. bisexualis var. ambisexualis (Raper) Milko (1983) = Achlya ambisexualis
- A. brasiliensis A.I. Milanez (1965) = Newbya brasiliensis
- A. braunii Reinsch (1877) = Newbya androgyna
- A. cambrica (Trow) T.W. Johnson (1956) = Achlya americana
- A. curvicollis Beroqui (1969) = Newbya curvicollis
- A. debaryana var. americana (Humphrey) Minden (1912) = Achlya americana,
- A. debaryana var. intermedia Minden (1912) = Achlya debaryana
- A. dioica Pringsh. (1860) = Saprolegnia dioica, Saprolegniaceae
- A. dubia var. pigmenta Chaudhuri & Kochhar (1935) = Achlya dubia
- A. flagellata var. yezoensis S. Ito & Nagai (1931) = Achlya flagellata
- A. klebsiana var. indica Chaudhuri & Kochhar (1936) = Achlya klebsiana
- A. lignicola Hildebr. (1867) = Achlya racemosa
- A. megasperma Humphrey (1893) = Newbya megasperma
- A. mucronata Ziegler (1958) = Protoachlya mucronata
- A. oblongata de Bary (1888) = Newbya oblongata
- A. oblongata var. gigantica E.J. Forbes (1935) = Newbya oblongata
- A. oblongata var. globosa Humphrey (1893) = Newbya oblongata
- A. oligocantha de Bary (1888) = Newbya oligocantha
- A. oligocantha var. brevispina Schkorb. (1923) = Newbya oligocantha
- A. ornata T.W. Johnson & R.L. Seym. (2005) = Newbya pascuicola
- A. paradoxa Coker (1914) = Isoachlya paradoxa
- A. polyandra sensu de Bary, = Achlya debaryana
- A. polyandra Hildebr. (1867) = Newbya polyandra
- A. racemosa f. maxima Minden (1912) = Achlya racemosa
- A. racemosa f. polyspora Schkorb. (1923) = Achlya racemosa
- A. racemosa var. lignicola (Hildebr.) Cornu (1881) = Achlya racemosa
- A. racemosa var. maxima (Minden) Cejp (1959) = Achlya racemosa
- A. racemosa var. spinosa (de Bary) Cornu (1881) = Newbya spinosa
- A. racemosa var. stelligera Cornu (1881) = Achlya racemosa
- A. recurva Cornu (1881) = Newbya recurva
- A. spinosa de Bary (1881) = Newbya spinosa
- A. stellata de Bary (1888) = Newbya stellata
- A. stellata var. multispora J.N. Rai & J.K. Misra (1977) = Protoachlya mucronata
- A. treleaseana (Humphrey) Kauffman (1906) = Newbya androgyna
- Steciow, Mónica M. (2001). "A new freshwater species of Achlya from Tierra del Fuego province, Argentina". New Zealand Journal of Botany. 39 (2): 277–283. Bibcode:2001NZJB...39..277S. doi:10.1080/0028825X.2001.9512738.
- Sosa, Emilio R.; Landsberg, Jan H.; Kiryu, Yasunari; Stephenson, Christy M.; Cody, Theresa T.; Dukeman, Angela K.; Wolfe, Heather P.; Vandersea, Mark W.; Litaker, R. Wayne (March 2007). "Pathogenicity studies with the fungi Aphanomyces invadans, Achlya bisexualis, and Phialemonium dimorphosporum: induction of skin ulcers in striped mullet". Journal of Aquatic Animal Health. 19 (1): 41–48. Bibcode:2007JAqAH..19...41S. doi:10.1577/H06-013.1. PMID 18236631.
- Harold F M, Money N P (1992). "Extension growth of the water mold Achlya: interplay of turgor and wall strength". PNAS. 89 (10): 4245–4249. Bibcode:1992PNAS...89.4245M. doi:10.1073/pnas.89.10.4245. PMC 49058. PMID 11607292.
