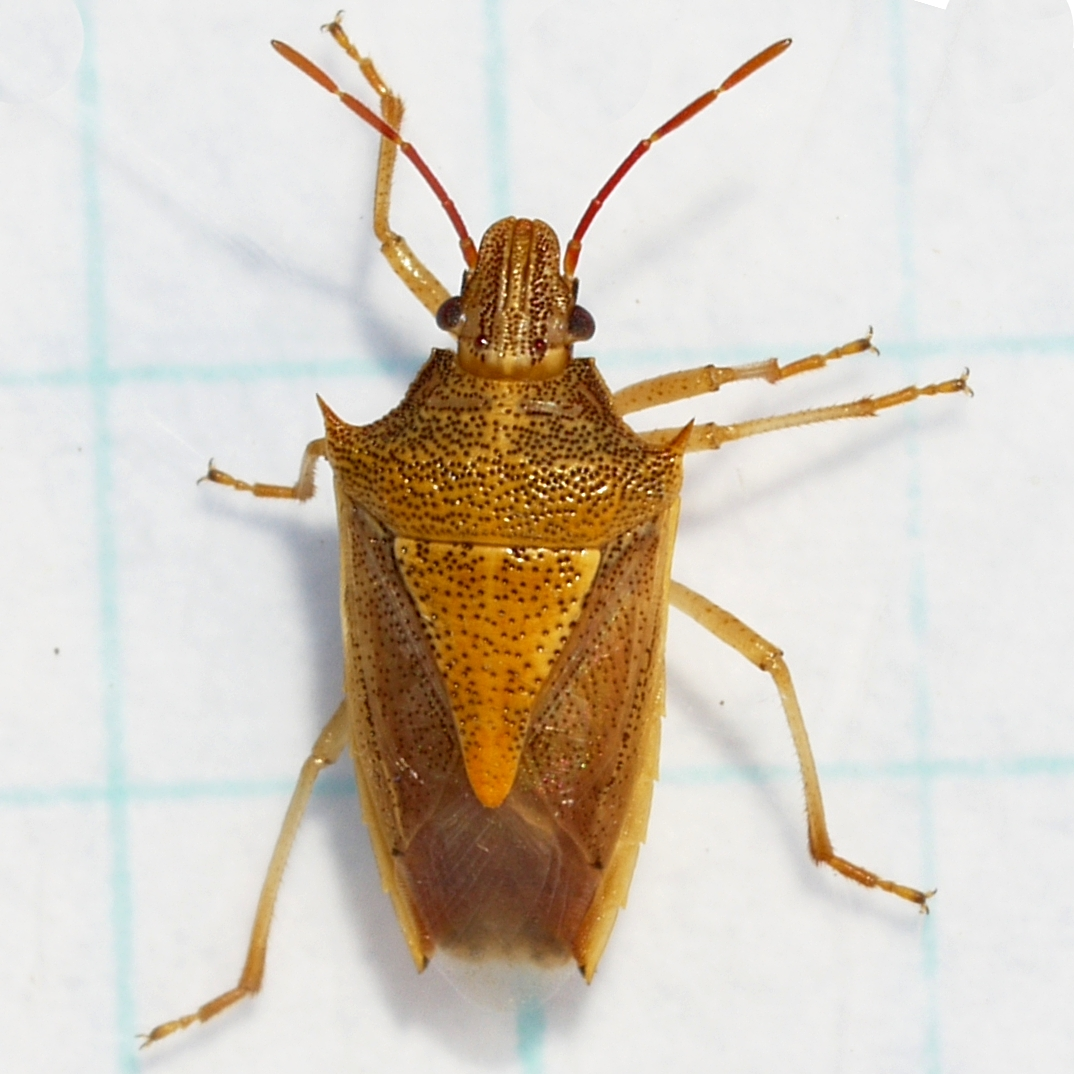
- Adult

Scientific classification
- Kingdom: Animalia
- Phylum: Arthropoda
- Class: Insecta
- Order: Hemiptera
- Suborder: Heteroptera
- Family: Pentatomidae
- Genus: Oebalus
- Species: O. pugnax

Binomial name
- Oebalus pugnax (Fabricius, 1775)

= Oebalus pugnax =

Species of true bug

Oebalus pugnax, the rice stink bug, is a flying insect in the shield bug family Pentatomidae native to North America that has become a major agricultural pest in the Southern United States. It has been a known pest since at least the time of Johan Christian Fabricius, who described the species in 1775.

== Description ==
The adult Oebalus pugnax measures 0.375 inches (9.5 mm) to 0.50 inches (13 mm) long. It has a narrow profile that forms the shield shape characteristic of other stink bugs. These true bugs are typically straw-colored with sharp points on the apex of the shield and a yellow triangle exhibited on center of the shield. Some adults have gray coloring near the yellow triangle, while others may be a darker brown rather than straw-colored. However, the rice stink bug is easily distinguished from other stink bugs because of its narrower profile and lighter color than, for example, the brown marmorated stink bug.

== Behavior and crop damage ==
The rice stink bug is a significant pest of rice crops in the southern U.S., including Mississippi, Arkansas, Louisiana, and Texas (the Rice Belt). This agricultural pest is known to attack cereal crops with small seeds, particularly wheat, sorghum, and rice. The insect also lives in wild grasses such as Johnson grass, barnyard grass, and sedge, making control of cash crops difficult. They are occasionally found on other crops in which grasses are prevalent between the rows, even though the insect may ignore the field crop. The insect is extremely mobile and is known to travel en masse in and out of fields quickly in search of more favorable foods.

Non-food crop hosts of the rice stink bug include: Echinochloa crusgalli, Echinochloa colona, Digitaria sanguinalis, Panicum dicotomiflorum, Phalaris minor, Paspalum urvillei, and Sporobolus poiretti; the last two are the most common species that the bug prefers.

The rice stink bug will damage a developing seed head by feeding on the seed's endosperm, leaving an empty shell or shriveled kernels. This type of damage can precipitate microorganism diseases and other crop losses, most notably discoloration, "pecky rice," and lower quality produce. When Oebalus pugnax are found in non-target crops such as standing corn, they can be ignored since they "generally do not feed in corn." However, seedling corn is susceptible to the rice stink bug.

Although the rice stink bug is the source cause of "pecky rice" damage in rice crops, the kernel spotting and discoloration is the result of a fungal infection of the rice kernels by fungi such as species of the ubiquitous genus Fusarium.

== Related species ==
In South America, the small rice stink bug, Oebalus poecilus (also Solubea poecila), is the most destructive pest of rice crops. It attacks rice, barley, oats, corn, and wheat, while it occasionally attacks soybean, cotton, and guava. The small rice stink bug looks similar to the rice stink bug.

== See also ==
- List of rice diseases
- Stink bug
