= James Ellis Humphrey =

American botanist and mycologist

James Ellis Humphrey (1861-1897) was an American botanist and mycologist. He made notable contributions on Saprolegniaceae. He graduated from Harvard University. In 1892, he was elected to the American Philosophical Society.
