= Achlya conspicua =

Scientific classification
- Domain: Eukaryota
- Clade: Sar
- Clade: Stramenopiles
- Phylum: Oomycota
- Class: Saprolegniomycetes
- Order: Saprolegniales
- Family: Saprolegniaceae
- Genus: Achlya
- Species: A. conspicua

Binomial name
- Achlya conspicua Coker, (1923)

Species of single-celled organism

Achlya conspicua is a plant pathogen, including of rice seedlings.
