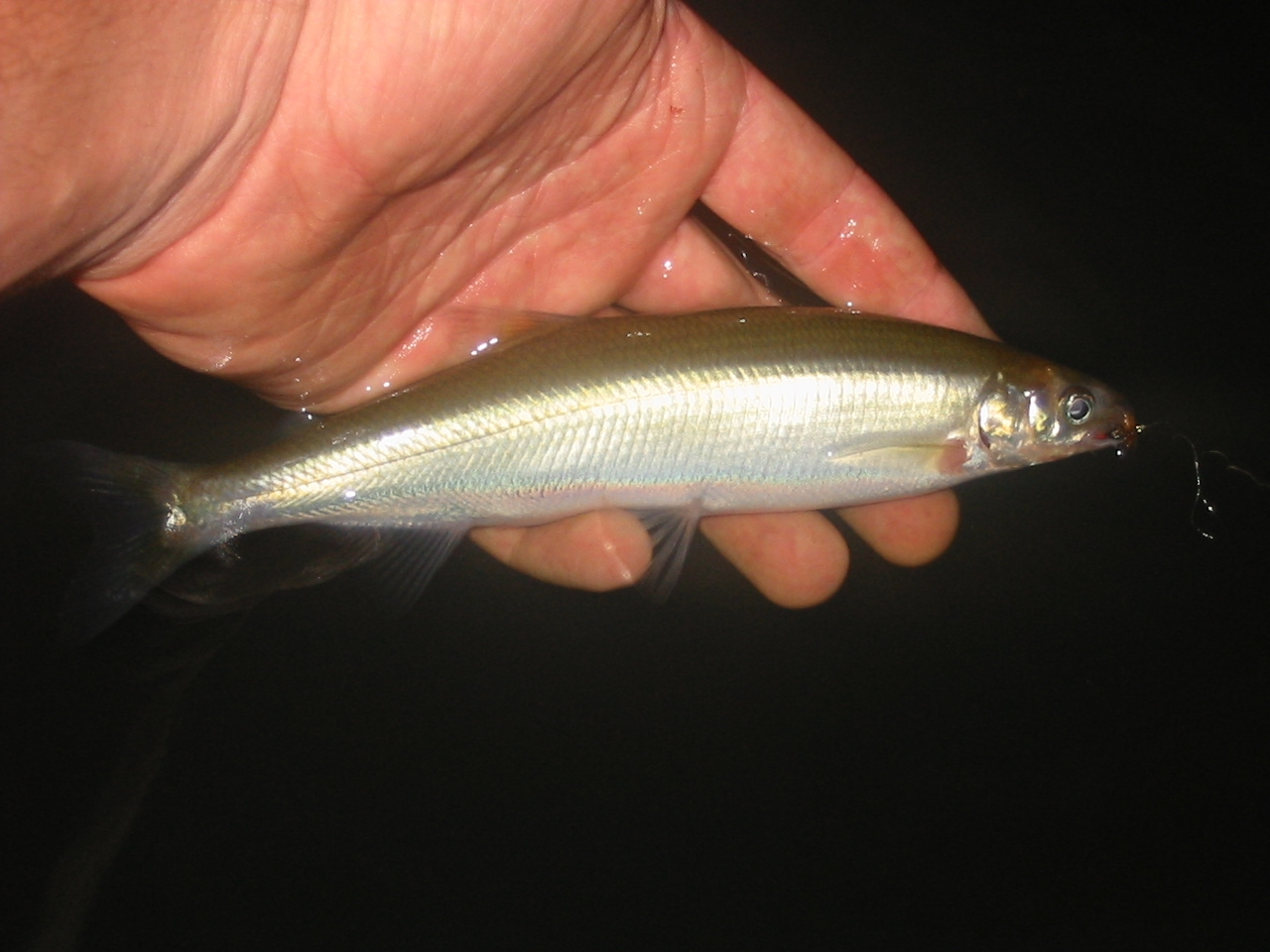
- A relatively small Australian grayling caught and released on a dry fly

Conservation status
- Vulnerable (IUCN 3.1)

Scientific classification
- Kingdom: Animalia
- Phylum: Chordata
- Class: Actinopterygii
- Division: Teleostei
- Order: Osmeriformes
- Family: Retropinnidae
- Genus: Prototroctes
- Species: P. maraena

Binomial name
- Prototroctes maraena Günther, 1864

= Australian grayling =

Species of fish

The Australian grayling (Prototroctes maraena) is a primarily freshwater fish found in coastal rivers in south-eastern mainland Australia and Tasmania. In past decades it has also been known as the cucumber mullet or cucumber herring, for its cucumber-like odour.

== Description and diet ==
The Australian grayling is a streamlined fish with a long and slender body and small conical head. Colouration is usually silver on the flanks and dusky olive on the back, overlain with a gold sheen.

Australian grayling commonly live for 2–3 years and reach around 20 centimetres (7.9 in) in length, although rare individuals have been recorded up to at least 5 years in age and 33 centimetres (13 in) in length. The fish has an omnivorous diet, feeding upon algae, shrimp, and small insects. They have specially adapted teeth and a long gut to help with the digestion of algae.

== Reproduction ==
Australian grayling spawn following movements down to the lower freshwater reaches of coastal rivers. Spawning is thought to occur in late autumn or early winter. McDowall (1996) reports that egg counts range from 25,000 to 67,000 in females 170–200 mm long, and that the small (~1 mm) demersal eggs probably settle among gravel and cobble in the river bed before hatching. Hatched larvae are washed out to sea. Australian grayling juveniles return to the freshwater reaches of rivers after roughly 6 months at sea and spend the rest of their lives in river habitats.

== Angling ==
Before the introduction of alien ("introduced") trout to Australian waterways the Australian grayling and spotted galaxias were keenly fished by recreational anglers using fly-fishing gear. The species was appreciated for its willingness to take wet and dry flies, its excellent fighting ability on very light tackle, and its reasonable size, and excellent eating qualities. However, due to declining numbers the fish is now protected under the Environment Protection and Biodiversity Conservation Act 1999. Heavy penalties apply for taking any of the fish.

== Historical declines and current threats ==
Australian grayling suffered massive initial declines in 1868–1870 through very large, unexplained fish kills (Saville-Kent, 1888). Australian grayling killed in these events are described as being covered in "cottony growths", a characteristic hallmark of the alien fungus-like oomycete Saprolegnia parasitica; these kills likely mark the arrival of this alien pathogen in Australian freshwater habitats via the importation, culturing and stocking of alien salmonid (trout) species.

Saville-Kent then went on to consider the apparent epidemic some 17–18 years previously which had caused the demise of the Australian grayling Prototroctes maraena. The grayling were said to "have been seen floating down the rivers in thousands, covered more or less extensively with a cottony fungoid growth. So virulent and exhaustive was this epidemic that many, more especially of the southern rivers, were more or less completely denuded of their stock of this species and have so remained up to the present date". Saville-Kent posed the questions of how, when and where the epidemic originated and whether at the time there were any abnormal conditions associated with the rivers carrying the infected fish. He went on to say: "The approximate date of the appearance of this epidemic would appear to be about the year 1869 or 1870, periods it may be remarked of great activity in association with the distribution of the fry of the newly acclimatised Salmonidae in the rivers of this colony. Is it possible ... that the fungus, Saprolegnia, was hitherto unknown to Tasmania and was introduced with the ova of these Salmonidae, or more probably in the moss wherein they were packed? Under such conditions the germs or spores, like the microbes of measles or smallpox, arriving on a virgin and congenial soil, might be expected to spread with devastating virulence among the aboriginal inhabitants."

Australian grayling is threatened by a number of factors. Dams and weirs block migration and also block floods and reduce base flows, both of which are important for habitat maintenance and for spawning and movement of grayling larvae and juveniles to and from the sea. Irresponsible forestry and farming practices degrade and fragment river environments through siltation and other effects. Alien trout species threaten grayling through predation and competition. Scientific studies have shown native fish species similar in habitat and lifestyle such as spotted galaxias are severely depressed in number in rivers inhabited by alien trout species (Ault & White 1994), and are forced into sub-optimal feeding locations, feeding times and diets by aggressive competition from alien trout species. A chronic lack of alien-trout-free habitat reserved for galaxias, grayling and other native fish species in south-eastern Australia generally is a major concern.

Two Australian grayling were observed in the Glenelg River in south-western Victoria in early 2021, the first recorded sighting since 1899. Scientists think that some of the environmental degradation caused after agriculture was introduced into the area was being reversed, and the health of the river and estuary has improved enough for the fish to make a comeback.

Australian grayling are listed as a vulnerable species under Australia's Environment Protection and Biodiversity Conservation Act 1999 and under the IUCN Red List. There are now a number of conservation measures focused on conserving the fish.
