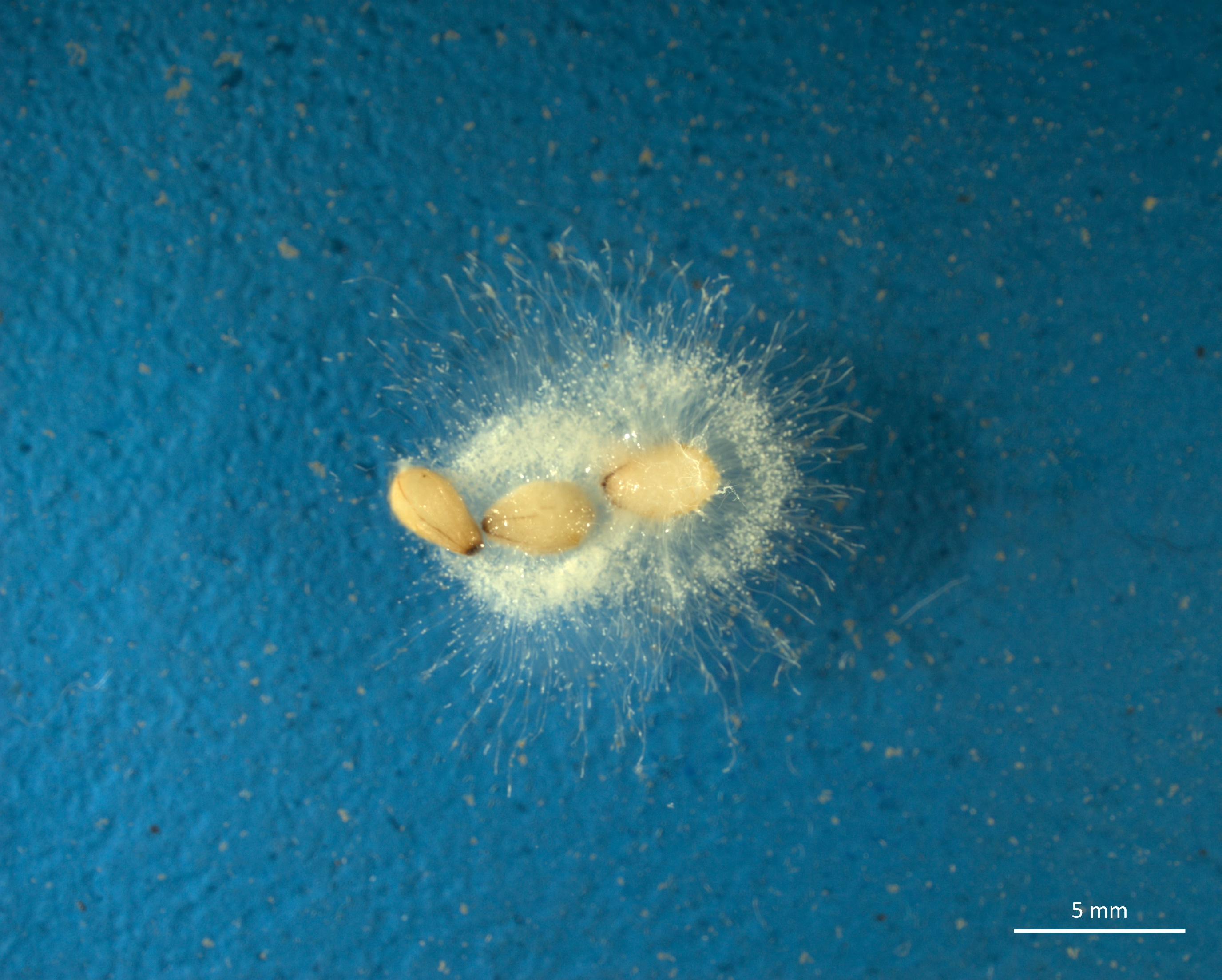
- Saprolegnia on sesame seeds

Scientific classification
- Domain: Eukaryota
- Clade: Sar
- Clade: Stramenopiles
- Division: Oomycota
- Class: Saprolegniomycetes
- Order: Saprolegniales
- Family: Saprolegniaceae
- Genus: Saprolegnia; Nees, 1823

Species
- Saprolegnia aenigmatica; Saprolegnia anisospora; Saprolegnia anomalies; Saprolegnia asterophora; Saprolegnia australis; Saprolegnia bulbosa; Saprolegnia delica; Saprolegnia diclina; Saprolegnia eccentrica; Saprolegnia ferax; Saprolegnia cf. ferax; Saprolegnia furcata; Saprolegnia hypogyna; Saprolegnia lapponica; Saprolegnia litoralis; Saprolegnia longicaulis; Saprolegnia megasperma; Saprolegnia milanezii; Saprolegnia mixta; Saprolegnia monilifera; Saprolegnia monoica; Saprolegnia multispora; Saprolegnia oliviae; Saprolegnia parasitica; Saprolegnia polymorpha; Saprolegnia racemosa; Saprolegnia salmonis; Saprolegnia semihypogyna; Saprolegnia subterranea; Saprolegnia terrestris; Saprolegnia torulosa; Saprolegnia truncata; Saprolegnia turfosa; Saprolegnia unispora

Synonyms
- Archilegnia Apinis, 1933; Cladolegnia Johannes, 1955; Diplanes Leitg., 1868

= Saprolegnia =

Genus of single-celled organisms

Saprolegnia is a genus of water moulds often called cotton moulds because of the characteristic white or grey fibrous patches they form. Current taxonomy puts Saprolegnia as a genus of the heterokonts in the order Saprolegniales.

== Habits ==
Saprolegnia, like most oomycetes, is both a saprotroph and necrotroph. Typically feeding on waste from fish or other dead cells, they will also take advantage of creatures that have been injured. An infection is known as oomycosis.

Saprolegnia is tolerant to a wide range of temperature, 3–33 °C (37–91 °F), but is more prevalent in lower temperatures. While it is found most frequently in freshwater, it will also tolerate brackish water and even moist soil.

Saprolegnia filaments (hyphae) are long with rounded ends, containing the zoospores. Saprolegnia generally travels in colonies consisting of one or more species. They first form a mass of individual hyphae. When the mass of hyphae grows large enough in size to be seen without use of a microscope, it can be called a mycelium. Colonies are generally white in color, though they may turn grey under the presence of bacteria or other debris which has become caught in the fibrous mass.

== Reproduction ==
It has a diploid life cycle which includes both sexual and asexual reproduction. In the asexual phase, a spore of Saprolegnia releases zoospores. Within a few minutes, this zoospore will encyst, germinate and release another zoospore. This second zoospore has a longer cycle during which most dispersal happens; it will continue to encyst and release a new spore in a process called polyplanetism until it finds a suitable substrate. When a suitable medium is located, the hairs surrounding the spore will lock onto the substrate so that the sexual reproduction phase can start. It is also during this stage of polyplanetism that the Saprolegnia are capable of causing infection; the most pathogenic species have tiny hooks at the end of their hairs to enhance their infectious ability.

Once firmly attached, sexual reproduction begins with the production of male and female gametangium, antheridia and oogonium respectively. These unite and fuse together via fertilization tubes. The zygote produced is named an oospore.

== Characteristics of infection ==
Saprolegnia is generally a secondary pathogen, though in the right circumstances, it can act as primary. It most frequently targets fish, both in the wild and in tank environments. Through necrosis of the skin, Saprolegnia will spread across the surface of its host as a cotton-like film. Though it often stays in the epidermal layers, the mould does not appear to be tissue specific. A Saprolegnia infection is usually fatal, eventually causing hemodilution, though the time to death varies depending on the initial site of the infection, rate of growth and the ability of the organism to withstand the stress of the infection.

The extensive mortalities of salmon and migratory trout in the rivers of western Europe in the 1970s and 1980s in the UDN outbreak were probably almost all ultimately caused by the secondary Saprolegnia infections.

Historical evidence suggest the Saprolegnia species affecting Australian freshwater fish may be an introduced strain, imported in the 1800s with exotic salmonid species.
