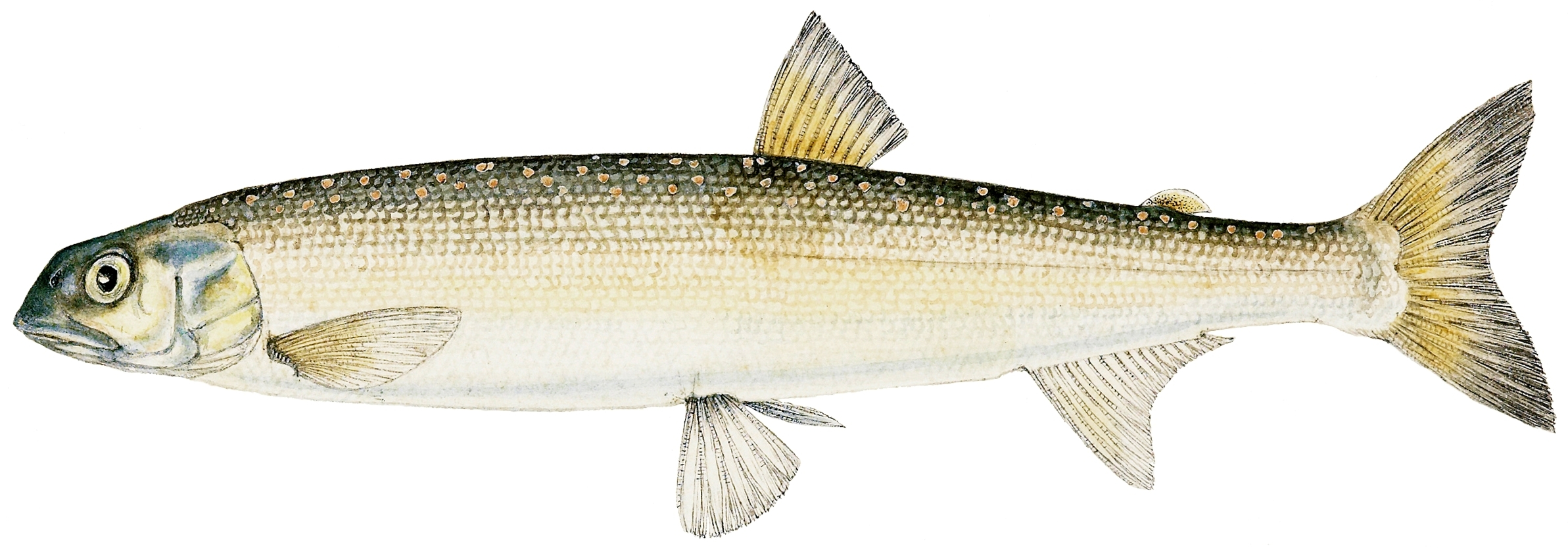
- Prototroctes oxyrhynchus

Scientific classification
- Kingdom: Animalia
- Phylum: Chordata
- Class: Actinopterygii
- Order: Osmeriformes
- Family: Retropinnidae
- Genus: Prototroctes; Günther, 1864

= Prototroctes =

Prototroctes Temporal range: Early Miocene to present

Genus of fishes

Prototroctes is a genus of New Zealand smelts containing one species native to Australia and another, now extinct, species that was native to New Zealand.

The two species in this genus appear to have diverged from one another during the Miocene, about 14 million years ago.

== Species ==
There are currently two recognized species in this genus:

- Prototroctes maraena Günther, 1864 (Australian grayling)
- †Prototroctes oxyrhynchus Günther, 1870 (New Zealand grayling)

In addition, two prehistoric species known only from fossil otoliths (Prototroctes modestus Schwarzhans, 2011 and Prototroctes vertex Schwarzhans, 2011) have been identified from the Early Miocene-aged St. Bathans fauna of New Zealand. Two complete fossil skeletons of an indeterminate Protroctes have been identified from the Pleistocene of New Zealand, and likely represent P. oxyrhynchus.
