= Achlya klebsiana =

Scientific classification
- Domain: Eukaryota
- Clade: Sar
- Clade: Stramenopiles
- Phylum: Oomycota
- Class: Saprolegniomycetes
- Order: Saprolegniales
- Family: Saprolegniaceae
- Genus: Achlya
- Species: A. klebsiana

Binomial name
- Achlya klebsiana Pieters

Species of single-celled organism

Achlya klebsiana is a plant pathogen. Studies say that this fungi potentially poses threats against fish in the Nile.

A. klebsiana has been found infecting farmed Channa striatus, and appeared to be causing significant disease.

A. klebsiana is a significant cause of germination failures in rice.
