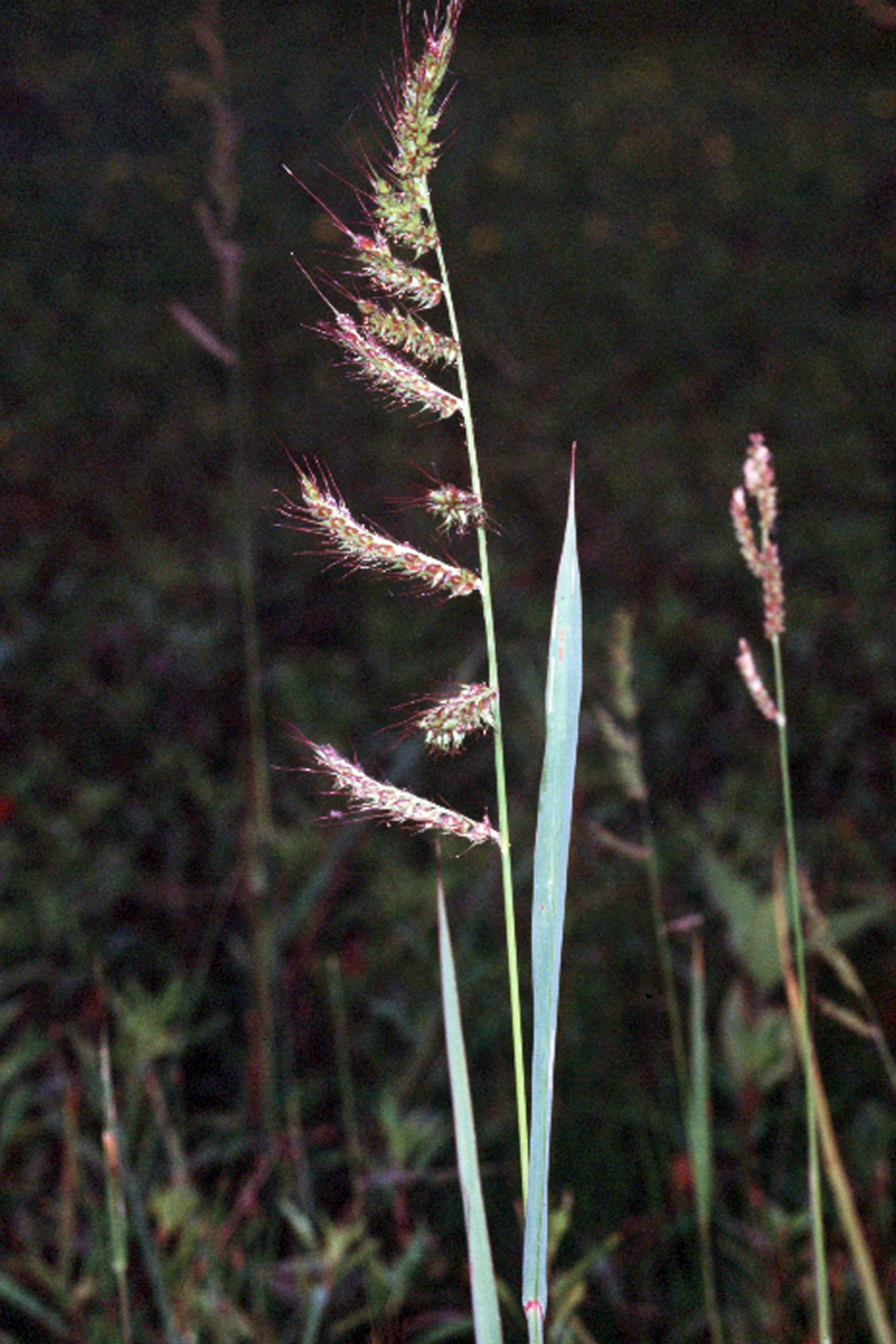

Conservation status
- Least Concern (IUCN 3.1)

Scientific classification
- Kingdom: Plantae
- Clade: Embryophytes
- Clade: Tracheophytes
- Clade: Angiosperms
- Clade: Monocots
- Clade: Commelinids
- Order: Poales
- Family: Poaceae
- Subfamily: Panicoideae
- Genus: Echinochloa
- Species: E. crus-galli

Binomial name
- Echinochloa crus-galli (L.) P.Beauv.

Varieties
- E. cg. var. utilis syn. E. esculenta

Synonyms
- Digitaria hispidula (Retz.) Willd.; Echinochloa caudata Roshev.; Echinochloa commutata Schult.; Echinochloa crus-corvi (L.) P.Beauv.; Echinochloa crus-pavonis var. austrojaponensis (Ohwi) S.L.Dai; Echinochloa crus-pavonis var. breviseta (Döll) S.L.Dai; Echinochloa crus-pavonis var. praticola (Ohwi) S.L.Dai; Echinochloa disticha St.-Lag. nom. illeg.; Echinochloa dubia Roem. & Schult.; Echinochloa echinata (Willd.) Nakai; Echinochloa formosensis (Ohwi) S.L.Dai; Echinochloa glabrescens Kossenko; Echinochloa hispida (E.Forst.) Schult.; Echinochloa macrocarpa var. aristata Vasinger; Echinochloa macrocarpa var. mutica Vasinger; Echinochloa macrocorvi Nakai; Echinochloa madagascariensis Mez; Echinochloa micans Kossenko; Echinochloa muricata var. occidentalis Wiegand; Echinochloa occidentalis (Wiegand) Rydb.; Echinochloa paracorvi Nakai; Echinochloa persistentia Z.S.Diao; Echinochloa pungens var. occidentalis (Wiegand) Fernald & Griscom; Echinochloa spiralis Vasinger; Echinochloa zelayensis (Kunth) Schult.; Milium crus-galli (L.) Moench; Oplismenus crus-galli (L.) Dumort.; Oplismenus dubius (Roem. & Schult.) Kunth; Oplismenus echinatus (Willd.) Kunth; Oplismenus limosus J.Presl; Oplismenus zelayensis Kunth; Orthopogon crus-galli (L.) Spreng.; Orthopogon echinatus (Willd.) Spreng.; Panicum alectorocnemum St.-Lag. nom. illeg.; Panicum alectromerum Dulac nom. illeg.; Panicum corvi Thunb. nom. illeg.; Panicum corvipes Stokes nom. illeg.; Panicum cristagalli Gromov ex Trautv.; Panicum crus-galli L.; Panicum cruscorvi L.; Panicum echinatum Willd.; Panicum goiranii Rouy; Panicum grossum Salisb. nom. illeg.; Panicum hispidum G.Forst.; Panicum limosum J.Presl ex Nees; Panicum oryzetorum Sickenb. nom. illeg.; Panicum scindens Nees ex Steud.; Panicum zelayense (Kunth) Steud.; Pennisetum crus-galli (L.) Baumg.

= Echinochloa crus-galli =

Species of plant

Echinochloa crus-galli is a species of wild grass originating from tropical Asia that was formerly classified as a panicum grass. It is commonly known as cockspur, cockspur grass, barnyard grass, barnyard millet, water grass, cocksfoot grass, cockshin grass. It is sometimes referred to using the general term, barnyard grass, which may refer to any species of the genus Echinochloa. This plant can grow to 1.5 m (5 ft) in height and has long, flat leaves which are often purplish at the base. Most stems are upright, but some will spread out over the ground. Stems are flattened at the base. The seed heads are a distinctive feature, often purplish, with large millet-like seeds in crowded spikelets.

Considered one of the world's worst weeds, it reduces crop yields and causes forage crops to fail by removing up to 80% of the available soil nitrogen. It acts as a host for several mosaic virus diseases. Heavy infestations can interfere with mechanical harvesting.

Individual plants can produce up to 40,000 seeds per year. Water, birds, insects, machinery, and animal feet disperse it, but contaminated seed is probably the most common dispersal method.

== Distribution and habitat ==
Barnyard grass commonly occurs in Europe and throughout tropical Asia and Africa in fields and along roadsides, ditches, along railway lines, and in disturbed areas such as gravel pits and dumps. It also invades riverbanks and the shores of lakes and ponds. It occurs in all agricultural regions. This species is considered an invasive species in North America where it occurs throughout the continental United States. It is also found in southern Canada from British Columbia east to Newfoundland. It was first spotted in the Great Lakes region in 1843.

== Ecology ==
Ranging from boreal moist to wet through tropical and very dry to moist forest life zones. Adapted to nearly all types of wet places, this grass is often a common weed in paddy fields, roadsides, cultivated areas, and fallow fields. It grows on variety of wet sites such as ditches, low areas in fertile croplands and wet wastes, often growing in water. It succeeds in cool regions, but is better adapted to areas where average annual temperature is 14–16 °C (57–61 °F). It is not restricted by soil pH.

== Usage ==
E. crus-galli was domesticated in southern Hokkaido 4,500 years ago.

A warm-season grass used as cattle fodder and is sometimes cultivated for this purpose. It is also suited for silage, but not for hay. It is fed green to animals and provides fodder throughout the year; hay made from this plant can be kept up to 6 years. This grass is also used for reclamation of saline and alkaline areas, especially in Egypt.

This grass is readily eaten by rabbits, deer, and waterfowl.

The grain of some varieties is eaten by humans in times of scarcity and sometimes used for adulterating fennel. The young shoots are eaten as a vegetable.

In the Hisar district of the Indian state of Haryana the seeds of this grass are commonly eaten with cultivated rice grains to make rice pudding or khir on Hindu fast days.

Barnyard grass was one of the five most cultivated crops during Joseon Dynasty in Korea.

Japanese barnyard millet (Echinochloa esculenta syn. E. cg. var. utilis), a domesticated form of E. crus-galli, is cultivated on a small scale in Japan, Korea and China. It underwent selection for larger grain size over a span of one or two millennia in Japan.

== Diseases and pests ==
This grass is subject to the brown spot disease caused by Bipolaris oryzae, a fungal infection.

== Gallery ==
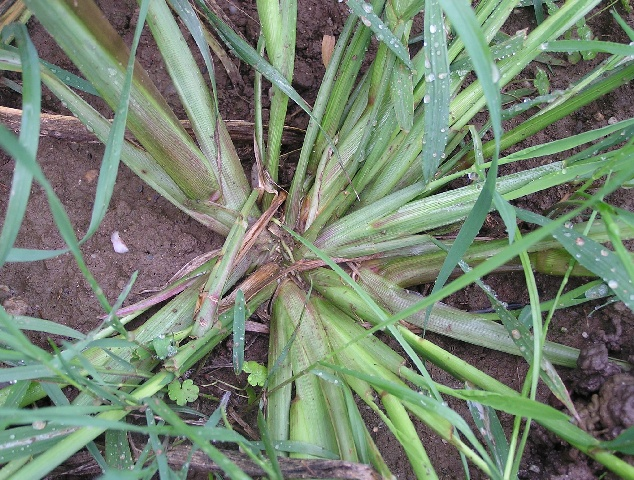
Near Neuss, Germany

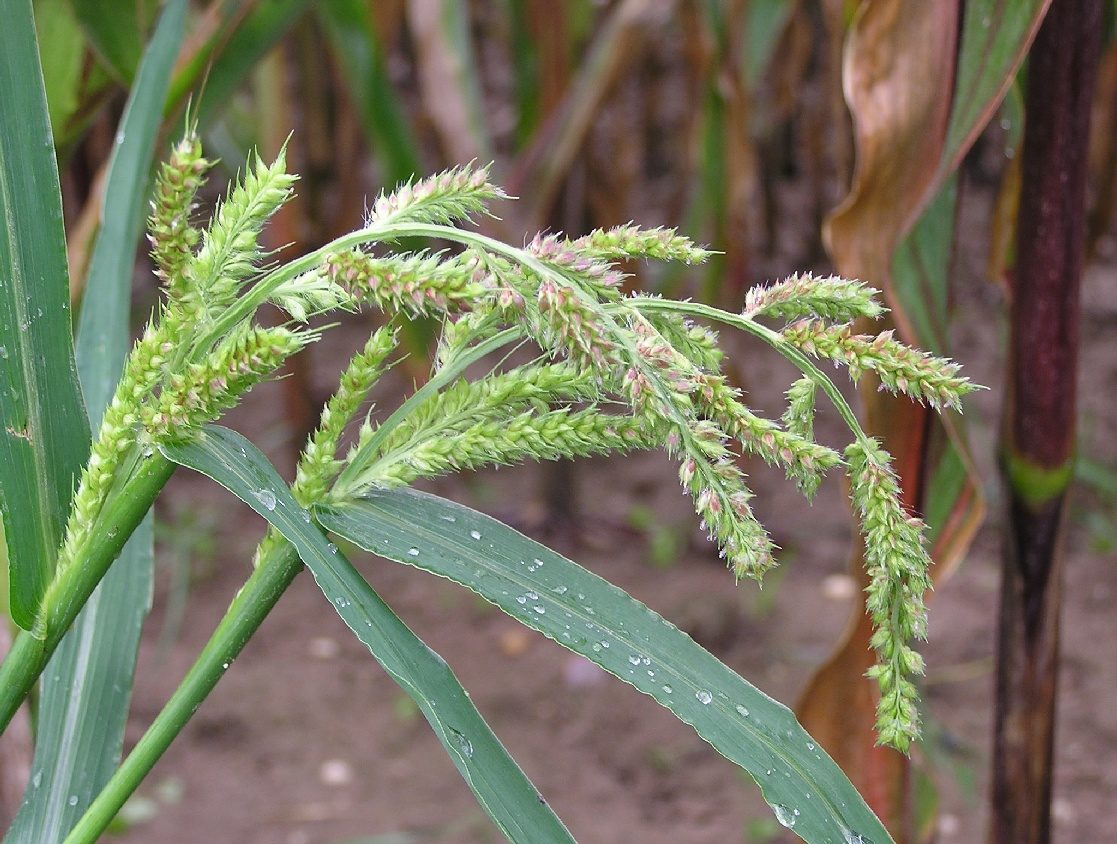
Near Neuss

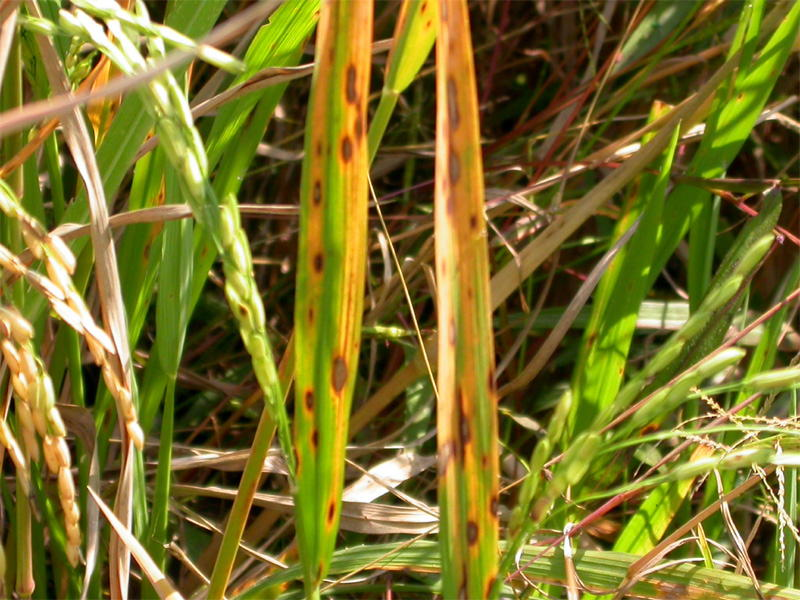
With brown spot Bipolaris oryzae
