= Achlya bisexualis =

Scientific classification
- Domain: Eukaryota
- Clade: Sar
- Clade: Stramenopiles
- Division: Oomycota
- Class: Saprolegniomycetes
- Order: Saprolegniales
- Family: Saprolegniaceae
- Genus: Achlya
- Species: A. bisexualis

Binomial name
- Achlya bisexualis Coker & Couch (1927)

Species of single-celled organism

Achlya bisexualis is a species of water mold. It is described as being close to Achlya flagellata, differing by it striking heterothallism and less elongated gemmae.

In 1936, it was discovered that the species contains a number of hermaphrodite females, which behave as true females in the presence of strong males.

Some of the protein of Achlya bisexualis have been sequenced, such as Actin, Cytochrome c oxidase subunit 1 & 2, Pyruvate kinase etc.

== Geography distribution ==
Achlya bisexualis can be found in fresh water of many place, such as Europe, North America, Korea, South Africa, India etc.

== Reproduction ==
Achlya bisexualis as other Achlya has asexual reproduction and sexual reproduction.

One kind of asexual reproduction is vegetative reproduction. Vegetative reproduction can be process when it is fragmented. Or when the environment condition is unfavor to Achlya bisexualis it will create gammae and be cut off by hyphae.

Another way of asexual reproduction is sporulation. During sporulation, the hyphal tip which will become sporangium will slightly inflate. The nuclei and cytosol will flow into the tip. There will be a cross wall to separate sporangium and other parts, then a gray central vacuole occurs in sporangium. The sporangium will start cleavage and then become homogeneous and uninuclear. Then primary zoospores formed and come out from the tip. These primary zoospores will germinate and release secondary zoospores, secondary zoospores will germinate and release tertiary zoospores, finally tertiary zoospores will grow to new mycelium.

Achlya bisexualis is heterothallic its sex organ antheridia and oogonia will develop on different somatic hyphae. During the sexual reproduction, the female Achlya bisexualis will release Antheridial (hormone A) to let male Achlya bisexualis grow antheridial initials. Second, the male Achlya bisexualis will release hormone B to let female Achlya bisexualis form oogonial initials. Third, oogonial initials will release hormone C to let antheridial initials grow towards the oogonial initials. When the antheridia contact with the oogonial initials, it will release hormone D to let the oogonial initials form oogonia and the eggs will start differentiation. Antheridia will give one male nucleus to each eggs in oosphere then become diploid oospore. These oospore will release when the oogonial wall be degraded. These oospores will grow zoosporangium, then it will go meiosis to create zoospores. Zoospores will grow to new mycelium.

== Saprolegniasis ==
Achlya bisexualis also can cause saprolegniasis to fishes as other water molds. It can grow at any part of skin, gill etc. but mostly at head. It will cause damage to fish skin. There are some chemical treatments for saprolegniasis, such as Malachite Green, Formalin and Copper sulphate.
