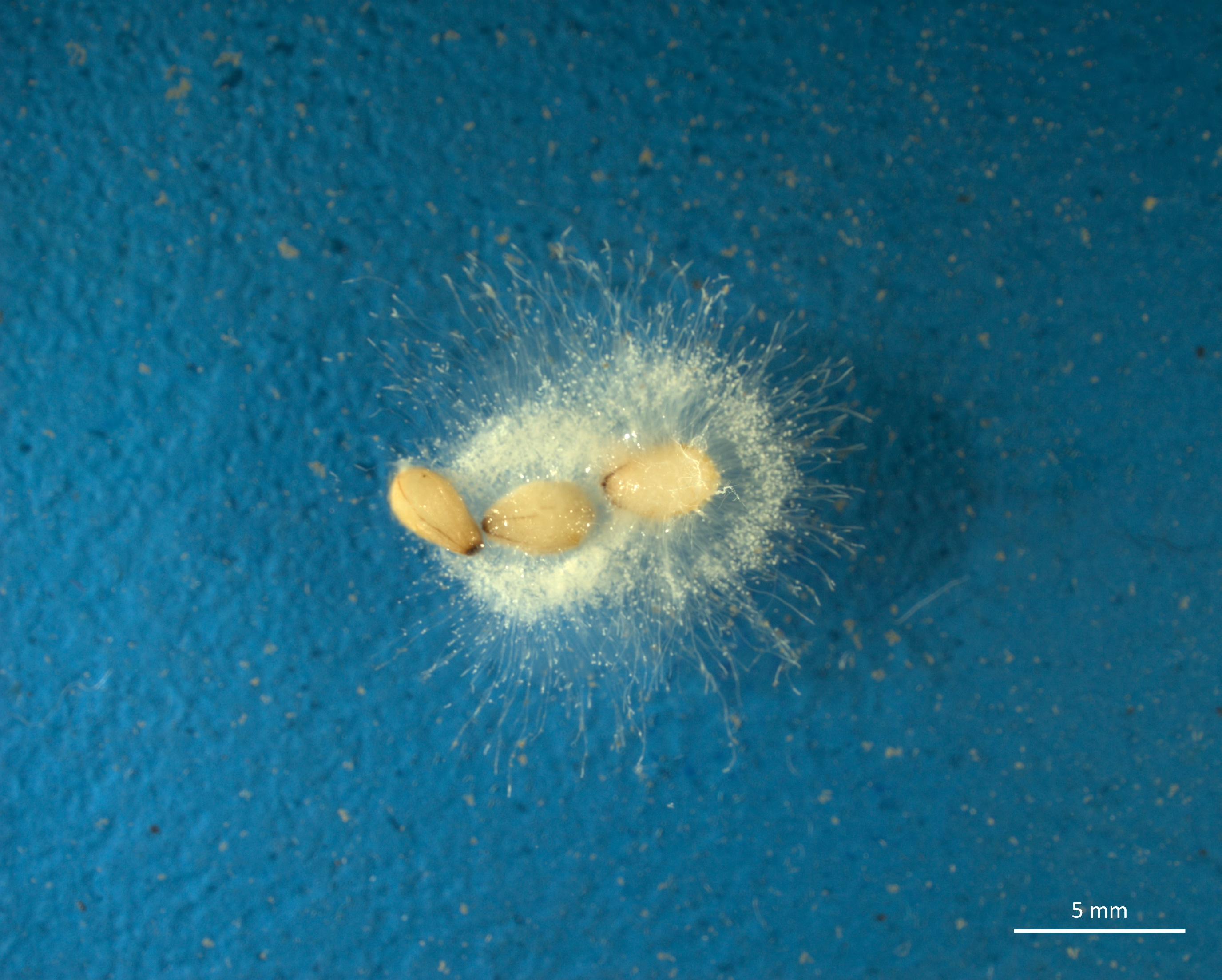
- Saprolegnia on sesame seeds

Scientific classification
- Domain: Eukaryota
- Clade: Sar
- Clade: Stramenopiles
- Phylum: Oomycota
- Class: Saprolegniomycetes
- Order: Saprolegniales
- Family: Saprolegniaceae; Kütz. ex Warm., 1884

Genera
- Achlya; Aplanes; Aplanopsis; Brevilegnia; Calyptralegnia; Dictyuchus; Geolegnia; Isoachlya; Newbya; Phragmosporangium; Protoachlya; Pythiopsis; Saprolegnia; Scoliolegnia; Thraustotheca

= Saprolegniaceae =

Family of single-celled organisms

Saprolegniaceae is a family of freshwater mould. James Ellis Humphrey (1861-1897), an American mycologist did significant work on this family.

== Taxonomy ==
Saprolegniaceae contains the following genera, species, and subspecies.

- Achlya
  - Achlya ambisexualis
  - Achlya americana
  - Achlya androgyna
  - Achlya apiculata
  - Achlya aquatica
  - Achlya bisexualis
  - Achlya bonariensis
  - Achlya caroliniana
  - Achlya catenulata
  - Achlya colorata
  - Achlya conspicua
  - Achlya crenulata
  - Achlya debaryana
  - Achlya dubia
  - Achlya flagellata
  - Achlya glomerata
  - Achlya heterosexualis
  - Achlya hypogyna
  - Achlya intricata
  - Achlya klebsiana
  - Achlya oblongata
  - Achlya oligacantha
  - Achlya orion
  - Achlya ornata
  - Achlya oviparvula
  - Achlya papillosa
  - Achlya primoachlya
  - Achlya prolifera
  - Achlya proliferoides
  - Achlya racemosa
  - Achlya radiosa
  - Achlya recurva
  - Achlya rodrigueziana
  - Achlya sparrowii
  - Achlya spiralis
  - Achlya stellata
  - Achlya treleaseana
- Aplanes
  - Aplanes androgynus
  - Aplanes treleaseanus
- Aplanopsis
  - Aplanopsis terrestris
- Brevilegnia
  - Brevilegnia bispora
  - Brevilegnia gracilis
  - Brevilegnia longicaulis
  - Brevilegnia macrospora
  - Brevilegnia megasperma
  - Brevilegnia minutandra
  - Brevilegnia unisperma
    - Brevilegnia unisperma var. delica
  - Brevilegnia variabilis
- Calyptralegnia
  - Calyptralegnia achlyoides
- Dictyuchus
  - Dictyuchus monosporus
  - Dictyuchus pseudodictyon
  - Dictyuchus sterilis
- Geolegnia
  - Geolegnia helicoides
- Isoachlya
  - Isoachlya toruloides
- Newbya
  - Newbya dichotoma
  - Newbya spinosa
- Phragmosporangium
  - Phragmosporangium uniseriatum
- Protoachlya
  - Protoachlya paradoxa
  - Protoachlya polysporus
- Pythiopsis
  - Pythiopsis cymosa
  - Pythiopsis humphreyana
  - Pythiopsis intermedia
  - Pythiopsis irregularis
  - Pythiopsis terrestris
- Saprolegnia
  - Saprolegnia aenigmatica
  - Saprolegnia anisospora
  - Saprolegnia anomalies
  - Saprolegnia asterophora
  - Saprolegnia australis
  - Saprolegnia bulbosa
  - Saprolegnia delica
  - Saprolegnia diclina
  - Saprolegnia eccentrica
  - Saprolegnia ferax
  - Saprolegnia cf. ferax
  - Saprolegnia furcata
  - Saprolegnia hypogyna
  - Saprolegnia lapponica
  - Saprolegnia litoralis
  - Saprolegnia longicaulis
  - Saprolegnia megasperma
  - Saprolegnia milanezii
  - Saprolegnia mixta
  - Saprolegnia monilifera
  - Saprolegnia monoica
  - Saprolegnia multispora
  - Saprolegnia oliviae
  - Saprolegnia parasitica
  - Saprolegnia polymorpha
  - Saprolegnia racemosa
  - Saprolegnia salmonis
  - Saprolegnia semihypogyna
  - Saprolegnia subterranea
  - Saprolegnia terrestris
  - Saprolegnia torulosa
  - Saprolegnia truncata
  - Saprolegnia turfosa
  - Saprolegnia unispora
- Scoliolegnia
  - Scoliolegnia asterophora
- Sommerstorffia Arnaudov 1923
- Sommerstorffia spinosa Arnaudov
- Thraustotheca
  - Thraustotheca clavata
  - Thraustotheca terrestris
