= Saprolegnia parasitica =

Scientific classification
- Domain: Eukaryota
- Supergroup: Stramenopiles
- Division: Oomycota
- Class: Saprolegniomycetes
- Order: Saprolegniales
- Family: Saprolegniaceae
- Genus: Saprolegnia
- Species: S. parasitica

Binomial name
- Saprolegnia parasitica Coker, (1923)

Species of freshwater and estuarine oomycete

Saprolegnia parasitica is a species of freshwater and estuarine water mold, or oomycete, in the genus Saprolegnia. The species is an important pathogen of fish and fish eggs and is one of the principal causative agents of saprolegniasis (or cotton wool disease) in aquaculture. Although historically grouped with fungi, S. parasitica is classified as a water mold, and is more closely related to brown algae and diatoms than to true fungi.

== Taxonomy ==
S. parasitica was first described in 1923.

== Description ==
The hyphae of S. parasitica contain cellulose, which provide structural integrity.

Saprolegnia parasitica grows readily on Sabouraud dextrose agar at room temperature (20-25 °C).

== Ecology and host range ==
S. parasitica are saprophytic organism that derive nutrients from organic matter in the water. This species is widely distributed globally.

=== Fish aquaculture ===
Saprolegnia parasitica is associated with significant economic loss in the aquaculture industry. Mortality associated with saprolegniasis is estimated to affect approximately one in ten hatched salmon.

=== Wild fish populations ===
Saprolegnia parasitica is also responsible for infections in wild fish populations.

== Pathogenesis and disease ==
=== Pathogenesis ===
S. parasitica infection is facilitated by the translocation of effector proteins into infected host cells that impede host defenses. S. parasitica cysts produce clusters of long haired hooks that facilitate attachment to surfaces. The parasite appears to be able to modulate the number and length of these bundles in order to facilitate attachment to different types of surfaces. Proteomics of the extracellular matrix indicates enrichment of putative attachment and adhesion related proteins.

=== Signs and symptoms ===
In fish, S. parasitica infection is characterized by whitish gray growths on the skin, fins, head, or gills. The species primarily affects broodfish and incubating eggs.

=== Diagnosis ===
Definitive diagnosis of Saprolegnia parasitica infections is laborious and time consuming. Recognition of S. parasitica relies on the cultivation of the mold in pure culture on solid media followed by morphological examination or internal transcribed spacer (ITS) sequencing.

=== Treatment ===
Saprolegnia parasitica infections were historically treated with the fungicide, malachite green. Malachite green was administered by submerging the fish or eggs into baths containing malachite green or in combination with other antimicrobial compounds. The use of malachite green in fish intended for consumption was banned by the European Commission in 2010 due to concerns about potential carcinogenicity and toxicity. Currently there are no effective treatment methods that are approved for fish intended for human consumption.

Due to the significant impact S. parasitica has on aquaculture and the lack of effective treatment methods, considerable research is being conducted on potential treatment methods. One compound currently being investigated is linalool, a natural antibiotic alternative found in essential oils. Under in vitro conditions, linalool was found to inhibit protein synthesis and disrupt the cell membrane of S. parasitica. Under in vivo conditions, linalool strengthened the immune response against the pathogen by enhancing the complement and coagulation systems. Additionally, linalool also increased the amount of protective Actinobacteriota flora present in treated fish.
