= Prototroctes vertex =

Prototroctes vertex Temporal range: Early Miocene

Scientific classification
- Kingdom: Animalia
- Phylum: Chordata
- Class: Actinopterygii
- Order: Osmeriformes
- Family: Retropinnidae
- Genus: Prototroctes
- Species: †P. vertex

Binomial name
- †Prototroctes vertex Schwarzhans et al., 2012

Extinct species of fish

Prototroctes vertex is an extinct species of bony fish in the genus Prototroctes. It existed in what is now New Zealand in the early Miocene epoch. It was described by Werner Schwarzhans, R. Paul Scofield, Alan J. D. Tennyson, Jennifer P. Worthy and Trevor H. Worthy in 2012.
