= Pseudomonas fuscovaginae =

Scientific classification
- Domain: Bacteria
- Kingdom: Pseudomonadati
- Phylum: Pseudomonadota
- Class: Gammaproteobacteria
- Order: Pseudomonadales
- Family: Pseudomonadaceae
- Genus: Pseudomonas
- Species: P. fuscovaginae

Binomial name
- Pseudomonas fuscovaginae (ex Tanii, et al. 1976); Miyajima, et al. 1983

Synonyms
- Pseudomonas fuscovaginae Tanii, et al. 1976

Pathogenic bacterium

Pseudomonas fuscovaginae is a fluorescent, Gram-negative, soil bacterium that causes brown sheath rot of rice and wheat. The type strain is CCUG 32780.

== Life cycle ==
Ps. fuscovaginae is a seed-borne pathogen.
