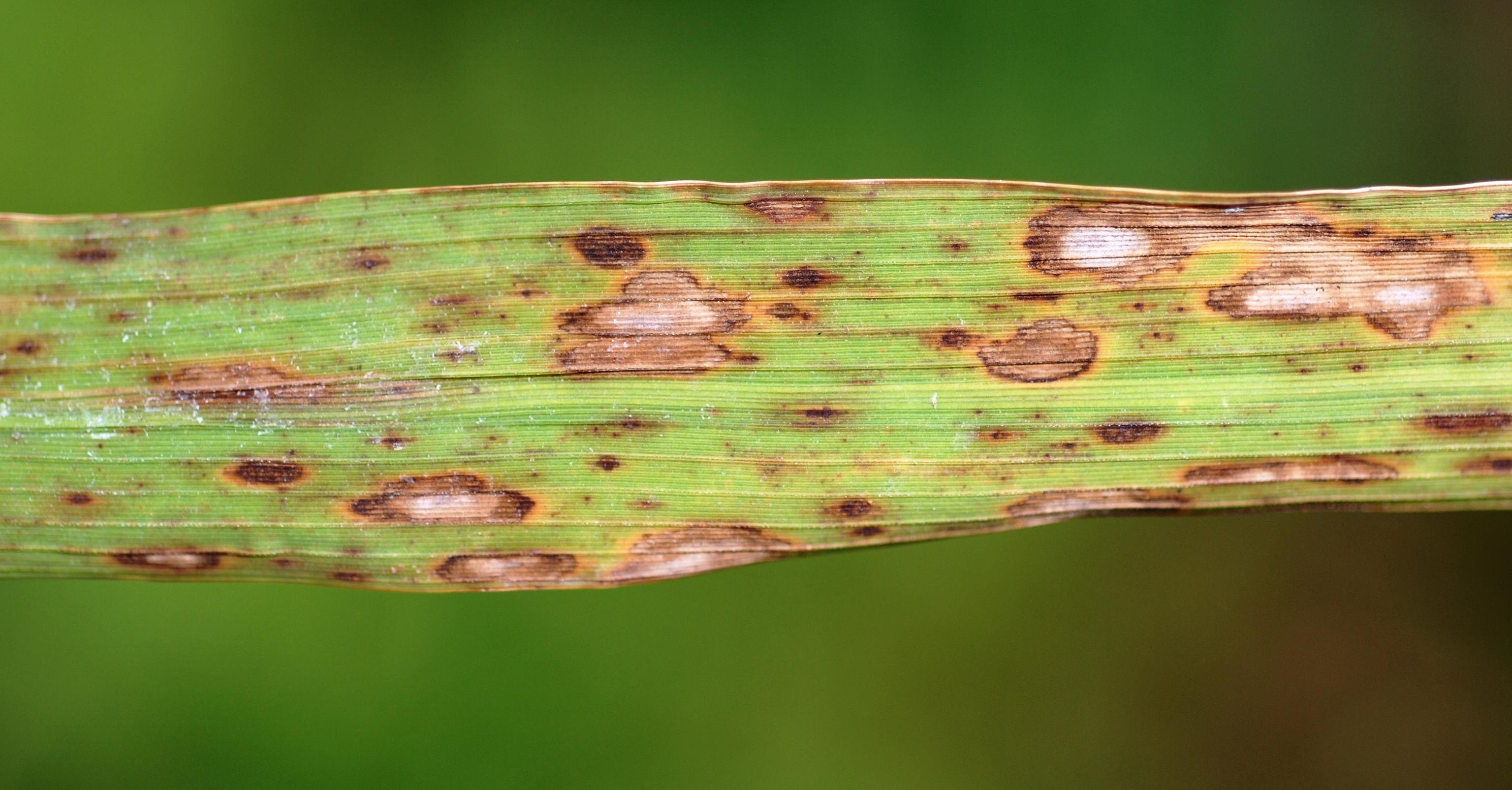
- Symptoms of Cochliobolus miyabeanus on rice

Scientific classification
- Kingdom: Fungi
- Division: Ascomycota
- Class: Dothideomycetes
- Order: Pleosporales
- Family: Pleosporaceae
- Genus: Cochliobolus
- Species: C. miyabeanus

Binomial name
- Cochliobolus miyabeanus (S.Ito & Kurib.) Drechsler ex Dastur

= Cochliobolus miyabeanus =

Species of fungus

Cochliobolus miyabeanus (teleomorph, formerly known as Helminthosporium oryzae, anamorph Bipolaris oryzae) is a fungus that causes brown spot disease in rice.

It was considered for use by the US as a biological weapon against Japan during World War II.

== Hosts and symptoms ==
Brown spot of rice is a plant fungal disease that usually occurs on the host leaves and glume, as well as seedlings, sheaths, stems and grains of adult host plants. Hosts include Oryza (Asian rice), Leersia (Cutgrass), Zizania (Wild rice), and other species as well such as Echinochloa colona (junglerice) and Zea mays (maize).

Cochliobolus miyabeanus may cause a wide range of symptoms. General symptoms occurring on the hosts can be observed on many parts of the plant, including leaves, seeds, stems and inflorescences, along with the presence of brown spot. Discoloration of stems is another symptom develops from brown spot of rice disease. Oval-shaped brown spots are the fungal growth sign, which have grey colored center developed on host leaves. The fungus produces a toxin known as ophiobolin which inhibits the growth of roots, coleoptiles, and leaves. This pathogen has also been known to produce non-host specific toxins which suppress plant defenses, causing the characteristic brown spots on rice leaves.

Dark coffee-coloured spots appear in the panicle and severe attacks cause spots in the grain and loss of yield and milling quality.

Also, lesions on glumes and seeds occur if the pathogen associates with other fungi and insects. Such lesions may develop when favorable condition for sporulation is present.

== Importance ==
Cochliobolus miyabeanus is an important plant pathogen because it causes a common and widespread rice disease that causes high level of crop yield losses. It was a major cause of the Bengal famine of 1943, where the crop yield was dropped by 40% to 90% and the death of 2 million people was recorded. It is a possible agroterrorism weapon. Other known severe crop loss cases caused by Cochliobolus miyabeanus are globally distributed. In the Philippines, rice seedling mortality rate has been recorded up to 60%. In India and Nigeria, it can reduce total crop yield by up to 40%. Similar losses are observed in Suriname and Sumatra.

== Environment ==
There are several factors influencing the disease cycle and epidemics of brown spot of rice disease.

1. Rainfall and drought – The first factor affecting Cochliobolus miyabeanus life cycle is rainfall and drought. It tends to proliferate when there is reduced rainfall and in dewy conditions. In addition to a low level of precipitation, severe epidemics of rice brown spot occur during drought season. Compared to well-flooded or irrigated areas, disease occurrence is favored in drier environments where a reduced amount of water is present.
2. Temperature and humidity – Another factor affecting disease development for Cochliobolus miyabeanus is temperature and humidity. Infection efficiency is influenced by the humidity level of the leaves, and lowered minimum temperature for crop cultivation favors epidemics of this disease. Infection by this pathogen is favored by long durations of leaf wetness; however, this disease has even been reported without free water when humidity levels are above 89%. Cochliobolus miyabeanus grows well at lower temperatures during its developmental stages compared to the developed stage, so if high temperatures are maintained in the area it is likely that farmers can restrict the growth of this pathogen. The optimal temperature for the pathogen is between 20 and 30 °C, however the pathogen can occur anywhere between 16 and 36 °C.
3. Nutrition level – Nutrition of the host plant may also influence the level of disease development. For example, low soil nutrient content is associated with epidemics of rice brown spot. If soil minerals such as nitrogen, potassium, phosphorus, silicon and manganese are deficient, this will likely favor disease development. In specific, in areas where silicon is present in a high amount in the soil, the host becomes less susceptible to this disease because silicon not only alleviates physiological stresses of the host, but also promotes disease resistance ability in the host. Furthermore, soil moisture level contributes to disease occurrence. Brown spot of rice is favored in areas where water content is low in soil.

== Management ==
=== Prevention ===
The spread of the fungus can be prevented by using certified disease-free seed and using available resistant varieties such as MAC 18.

Avoiding dense sowing will can also help prevent the spread of the fungus as it reduces humidity.

Maintaining control of weeds and removal of volunteer crops in the field can also prevent fungal spread, as well as burning the stubble of infected plants.

Seed treatments can also be used as a preventative measure. Seeds can be treated with fungicides or alternatively soaking seeds in cold water for 8 hours before treating with hot water (53–54 °C) for 10–12 minutes prior to planting.

Soil treatments can also be used to prevent the spread of C. miyabeanus. The addition of potassium and calcium if the soil is deficient can help boost disease resistance. However, excessive application of nitrogen fertilisers should be avoided.

=== Control ===
Once symptoms are observed the disease may be controlled by burning removal and burning of any plants and maintaining water levels up to 3 inches at grain formation. below grain formation.

== See also ==
- list of rice diseases

== Sources ==
This article incorporates text from a free content work. Licensed under CC BY-SA (license statement/permission). Text taken from Plantwise Factsheet for Farmers: Helminthosporiosis in rice, Dalcy Montenegro Coca, Raquel Pardo, Fabiola Mareño, Dionicio Sosa, CABI.

This article incorporates text from a free content work. Licensed under CC BY-SA (license statement/permission). Text taken from PMDG: Brown spot in rice -Thailand, Bureau of Rice Research and Development, Rice Department, CABI.

This article incorporates text from a free content work. Licensed under CC BY-SA (license statement/permission). Text taken from PMDG: Brown spot of rice - Pakistan, Yasar Saleem Khan and Amna Palwasha, CABI.

This article incorporates text from a free content work. Licensed under CC BY-SA (license statement/permission). Text taken from PMDG: Brown leaf spot of rice - Ghana, E. Moses, S. Akrofi and P. Beseh, CABI.

This article incorporates text from a free content work. Licensed under CC BY-SA (license statement/permission). Text taken from PMDG: Rice - Brown spot - Cambodia, GDA, Phnom Penh, Cambodia, CABI.

This article incorporates text from a free content work. Licensed under CC BY-SA (license statement/permission). Text taken from PMDG Green List: Brown leaf spot on rice, Plantwise, CABI.

This article incorporates text from a free content work. Licensed under CC BY-SA (license statement/permission). Text taken from PMDG: Brown spot on rice - Malawi, T. Maulana, D. Kachigamba, J. Chipole, H. Msatilomo and J. Nthenda, CABI.
