= Prototroctes modestus =

Prototroctes modestus Temporal range: Early Miocene

Scientific classification
- Kingdom: Animalia
- Phylum: Chordata
- Class: Actinopterygii
- Order: Osmeriformes
- Family: Retropinnidae
- Genus: Prototroctes
- Species: †P. modestus

Binomial name
- †Prototroctes modestus Schwarzhans et al., 2012

Extinct species of fish

Prototroctes modestus is an extinct species of bony fish in the family Retropinnidae. It existed in what is now New Zealand in the early Miocene epoch. It was described by Werner Schwarzhans, R. Paul Scofield, Alan J. D. Tennyson, Jennifer P. Worthy and Trevor H. Worthy in 2012.
