= Pythium dissotocum =

Scientific classification
- Domain: Eukaryota
- Clade: Sar
- Clade: Stramenopiles
- Division: Oomycota
- Class: Peronosporomycetes
- Order: Peronosporales
- Family: Pythiaceae
- Genus: Pythium
- Species: P. dissotocum

Binomial name
- Pythium dissotocum Drechsler, (1930)

Synonyms
- Pythium perigynosum

Pathogenic water mold

Pythium dissotocum is a plant pathogen infecting strawberry and rice.

== Disease cycle ==
Pythium dissotocum is a polycyclic oomycete root rot capable of both sexual and asexual reproduction. In its mid-season asexual phase, P. dissotocum disperses by forming filamentous sporangia, which produce vesicles housing 10-75 motile zoospores. Vesicles open, releasing zoospores which contact host roots, encyst, and produce a germ tube which infects the host root, and begins formation of mycelium.

In sexual reproduction, if multiple mating types are present, hyphal antheridium can contact each other and undergo plasmogamy, merging their membranes near the end of growing season. After several steps of differentiation and meiosis, an oospore, the primary survival structure, is formed. These thick-walled oospores can remain dormant for many months, and will eventually germinate through two methods. A sporangium can be produced, which generates a cyst and releases zoospores, or the oospore can create a germ tube which can directly penetrate and infect a host. This disease cycle is extremely dependent on water for dispersal, making greenhouses, irrigation systems, and hydroponics especially prone to spread of P. dissotocum.

== Importance ==
P. dissotocum is primarily a water-borne pathogen, and as a result poses serious threats to plants grown via hydroponics and by irrigation. With motile spores that can move quickly, infection spreads rapidly in water-logged crops and hydroponic systems. P. dissotocum can infect a large range of hosts, including many agricultural and horticultural crops like lettuce, spinach, peppers, parsnip, parsley, tomato, sugar cane, and carrot and hydroponic Cannabis sativa. Other economic products are threatened by the presence of P. dissotocum, including tree nurseries, maize/corn, and soybeans. Infection of P. dissotocum can lead to significant loss of crop yield due to necrosis of roots, root lesions, chlorosis, and damping off. This results in severe economic loss for farmers growing both sustenance crops, and commercial products. The organism is found in many regions across the Americas, Europe, and Asia, meaning that increasing globalization could cause introduction of the pathogen to potentially vulnerable crops and ecosystems.

== Diagnosis ==
RTPCR methods are available.

== Control ==
As a root rot, it tends to have more severe effects on young plants and seedlings, where it can damage and kill newly forming roots necessary for plant growth and nutrient acquisition. As a result, many control methods involve limiting the amount of exposure early in the season. Effective measure include application of fungicides like mefenoxam and phosphonates, often in conjunction. Additionally, inoculation with Pseudomonas chlororaphis, a common biocontrol inoculant used in horticulture, has potential to suppress symptoms of P. dissotocum infection, but is currently inconsistent in current trials, and doesn't block colonization. Like most root rots, P. dissotocum thrives in wet conditions. Preventing over-watering will help reduce infection in soil. Engaging in sanitation or fungicide treatment of tools and water can help reduce transmission and infection of P. dissotocum especially in irrigation or hydroponic systems. If infection has occurred, recovery can sometimes occur by trimming off damaged roots, and sterilizing those that are still white and healthy.
