= Ulcerative dermal necrosis =

Disease of salmon and trout

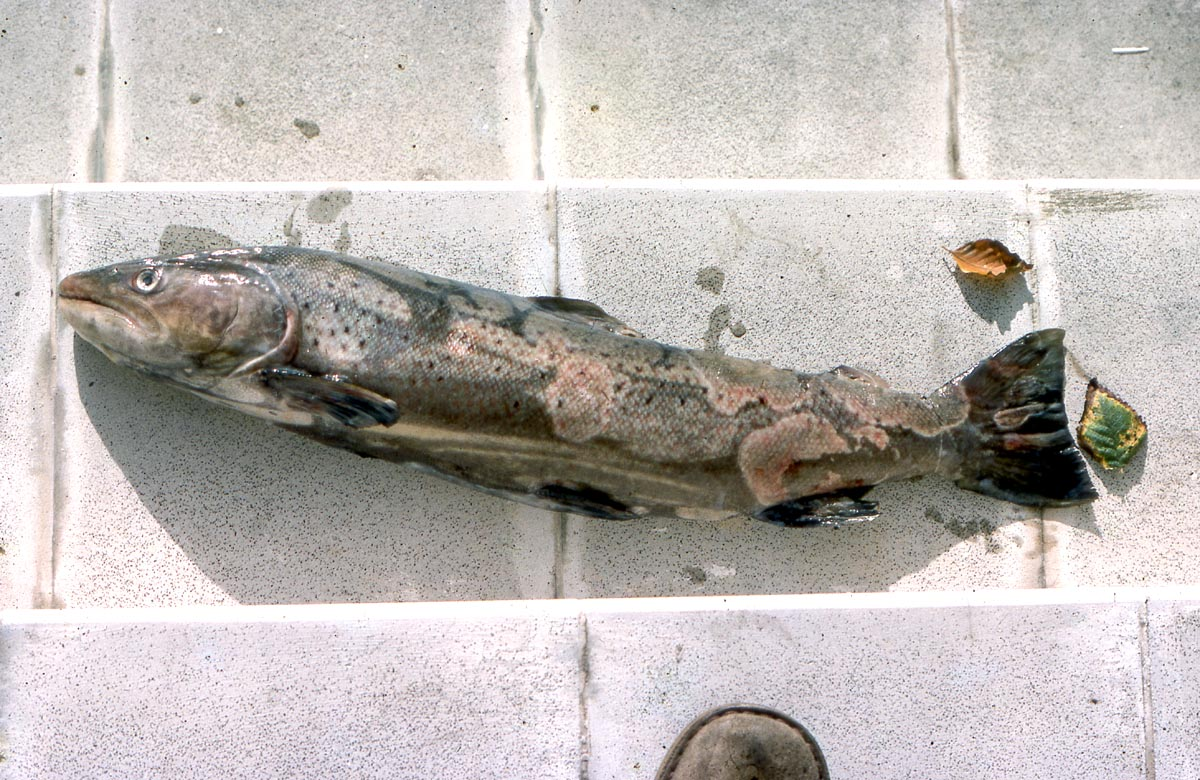
Sea trout affected by UDN with typical secondary Saprolegnia infections

Ulcerative dermal necrosis (UDN) is a chronic dermatological disease of cold water salmonid fish that had a severe impact on north Atlantic Salmon and sea trout stocks in the late 1960s and 1970s–1980. Despite much investigation, the cause of UDN has not been determined.

The onset of symptoms occurs after migration into freshwater. Affected fish develop severe skin lesions which begin on the head and back, and near the tail. Lesions become infected with overgrowths of oomycetes, such as Saprolegnia, giving the affected areas a slimy blue-grey appearance. The most severely affected fish frequently die before spawning.

Although the worst effects of the disease were seen in the 1970s and 1980, even now large numbers of salmon will succumb to the disease after spawning. This is thought be due in part to their weak post-spawning condition, and lack of food for several months whilst in the river.
