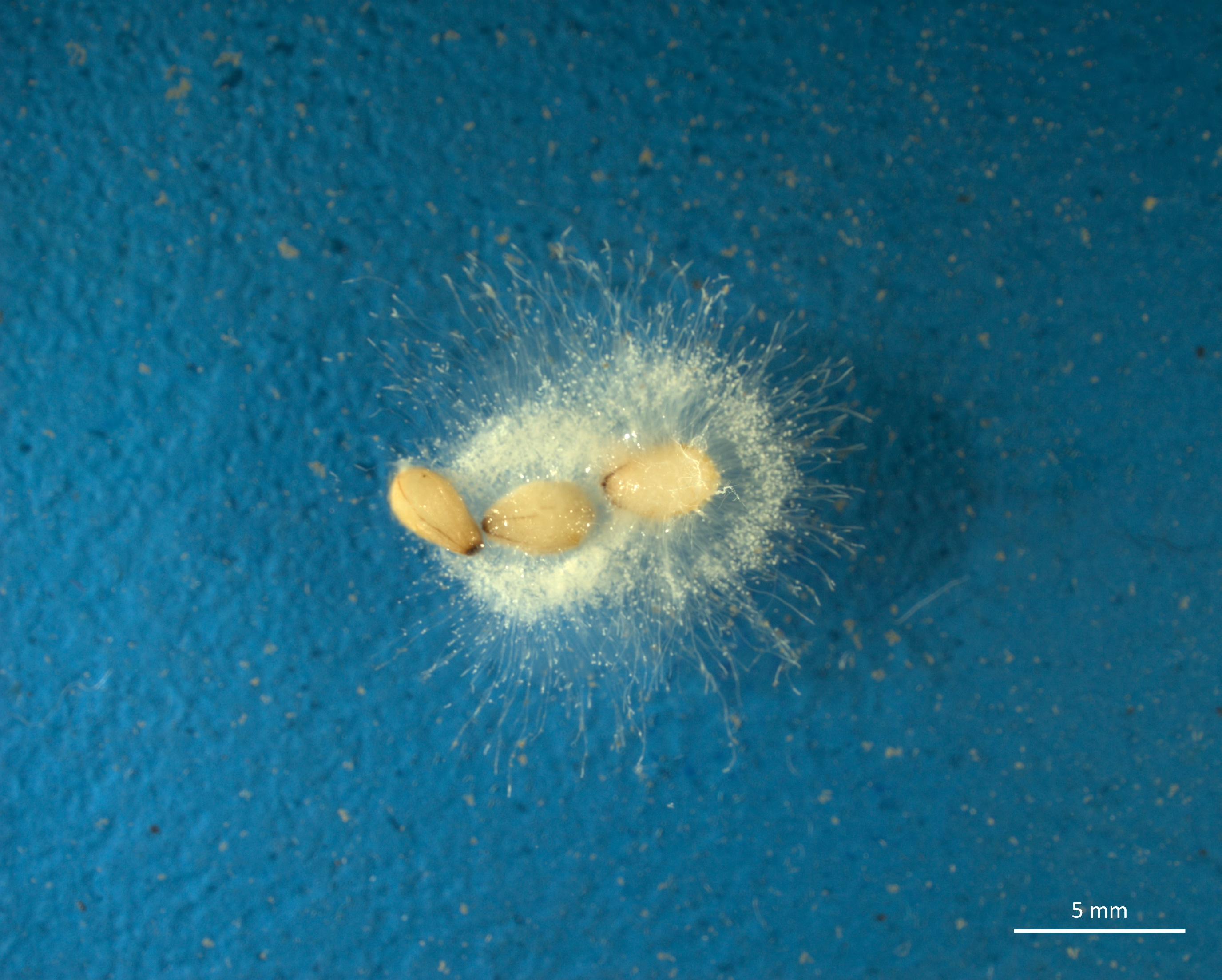
- Saprolegnia on sesame seeds

Scientific classification
- Domain: Eukaryota
- Clade: Sar
- Clade: Stramenopiles
- Phylum: Oomycota
- Class: Saprolegniomycetes
- Order: Saprolegniales; E. Fisch., 1892

Families
- Ectrogellaceae; Haliphthoraceae; Leptolegniaceae; Saprolegniaceae

= Saprolegniales =

Order of single-celled organisms

Saprolegniales is an order of water mould. Members of the order are responsible for numerous parasitic infections affecting aquatic life, such as crayfish plague and ulcerative dermal necrosis.
