= Corinne Watts =

New Zealand entomologist and ecologist

Corinne Hannah Watts is a New Zealand entomologist and ecologist. Specimens collected by Watts are held at Museum of New Zealand Te Papa Tongarewa.

== Education ==
Watts graduated from Victoria University of Wellington with a MSc (Hons) in Ecology in 1999, and gained a PhD in Invertebrate Ecology from the University of Canterbury in 2006.

== Conservation and entomology work ==
Watts is employed by Landcare Research in Hamilton, New Zealand, in the Biodiversity and Conservation team. Watts has been involved in the conservation of wētā, including the Mahoenui giant wētā, a large and endangered species native to New Zealand. Watts has also been involved with Landcare's tūī conservation work. Watts has also researched the impacts of predator-fences at Maungatautari, Waikato. In 2006, Watts was part of a team who first described Houdinia flexilissima, a species of moth endemic to New Zealand.

== Selected works ==
- Innes, J.; Watts, C.; Fitzgerald, N.; Thornburrow, D.; Burns, B.; Mackay, J.; Speedy, C. (8-12 February 2010). Unexpected behaviour of invader ship rats experimentally released behind a pest-proof fence. Island invasives: eradication and management. Auckland. pp. 38.
- Innes, J.G.; Watts, C.H.; Burns, B.R. (5-9 December 2011). Research in community-led sanctuaries in New Zealand. 25th International Congress for Conservation Biology (ICCB): "Engaging Society in Conservation". Auckland. pp. 129.
- Innes, J.; Watts, C.; Fitzgerald, N.; Thornburrow, D.; Burns, B.; MacKay, J.; Speedy, C. (2011). "Behaviour of invader ship rats experimentally released behind a pest-proof fence, Maungatautari, New Zealand." Occasional papers of the IUCN Species Survival Commission. 42: 437–440.
- Watts, C.; Thornburrow, D. (2011). "Habitat use, behavior and movement patterns of a threatened New Zealand giant weta, Deinacrida heteracantha (Anostostomatidae: Orthoptera)." Journal of Orthoptera Research. 20 (1): 127–135.
- Watts, C.; Stringer, I.; Gibbs, G. (2012). "Insect conservation in New Zealand: an historical perspective." In Insect Conservation: Past, Present and Prospect. Springer Science + Business Media. pp. 213–243. ISBN 978-94-007-2963-6
- Watts, C.; Empson, R.; Thornburrow, D.; Rohan, M. (2012). "Movements, behaviour and survival of adult Cook Strait giant weta (Deinacrida rugosa; Anostostomatidae: Orthoptera) immediately after translocation as revealed by radiotracking." Journal of Insect Conservation. 16 (5): 763–776. doi:10.1007/s10841-012-9461-8.
- Watts, C.; Thornburrow, D.; Innes, J. (2012). "Monitoring invertebrates in community-led sanctuaries." Kararehe Kino - Vertebrate Pest Research. 20: 16–17.
- Watts, Corinne; Thornburrow, Danny; Stringer, Ian; Cave, Vanessa. (2017). "Population expansion by Cook Strait giant wētā, Deinacrida rugosa (Orthoptera: Anostostomatidae), following translocation to Matiu/Somes Island, New Zealand, and subsequent changes in abundance." Journal of Orthoptera Research. 26 (2): 171–180. doi: 10.3897/jor.26.21712.
