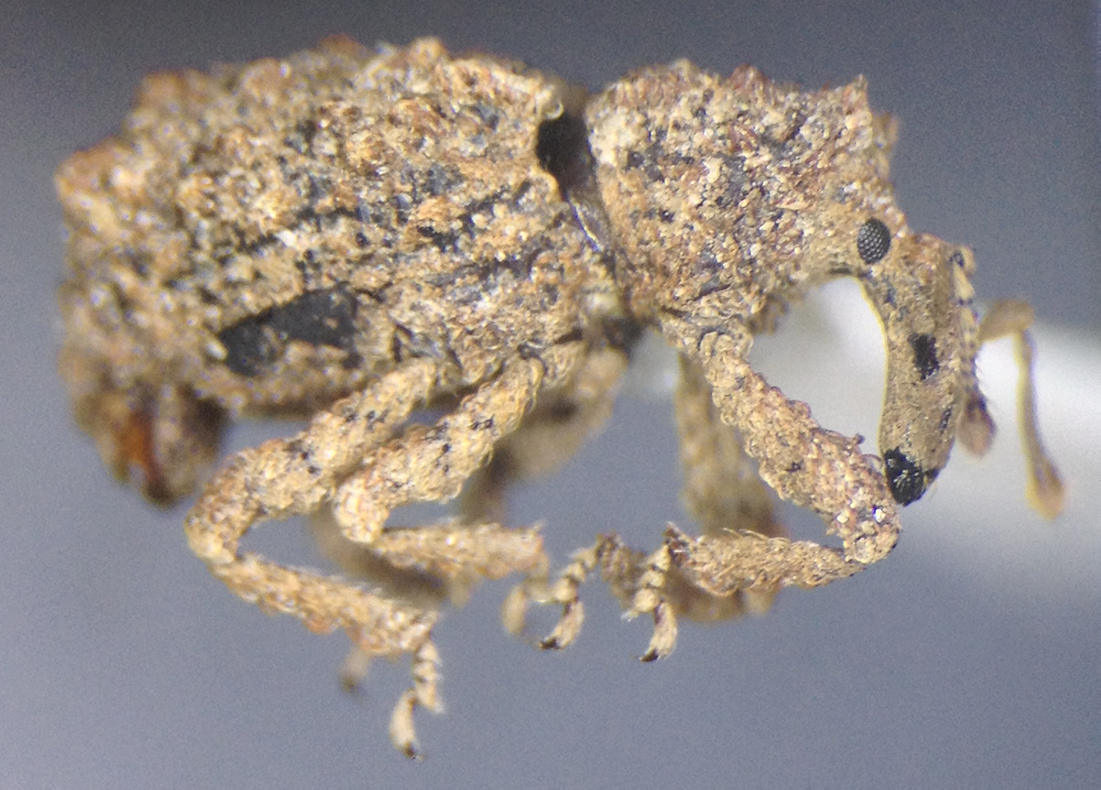
- Phrynixus astutus from Otago, New Zealand

Scientific classification
- Kingdom: Animalia
- Phylum: Arthropoda
- Class: Insecta
- Order: Coleoptera
- Suborder: Polyphaga
- Infraorder: Cucujiformia
- Family: Curculionidae
- Genus: Phrynixus
- Species: P. astutus

Binomial name
- Phrynixus astutus Pascoe, 1876

= Phrynixus astutus =

Weevil endemic to New Zealand

Phrynixus astutus is a weevil that is endemic to New Zealand. It has been found in lawns and garden beds in private gardens in Dunedin, and in two Wellington sanctuaries, Zealandia and Otari Wilsons Bush. This weevil is known to be a host for the parasitoid wasp Metaspathius kuscheli.
