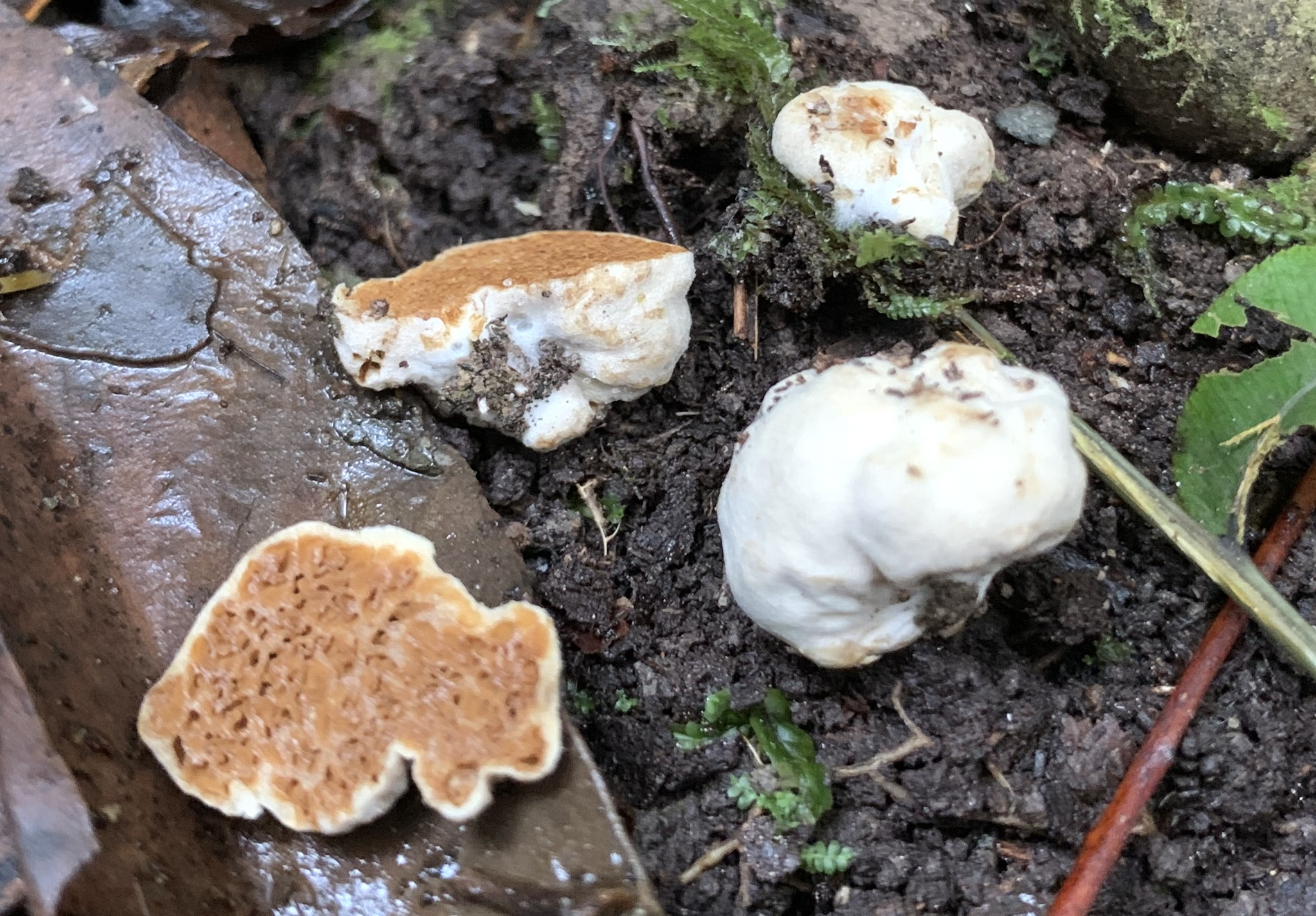

Scientific classification
- Kingdom: Fungi
- Division: Basidiomycota
- Class: Agaricomycetes
- Order: Agaricales
- Family: Cortinariaceae
- Genus: Cortinarius
- Species: C. meletlac

Binomial name
- Cortinarius meletlac Polman-Short, J. Barratt, Orlovich & T.Lebel

= Cortinarius meletlac =

Species of fungus

Cortinarius meletlac is a sequestrate ectomycorrhizal fungus in the genus Cortinarius. It is native to Australia and thought to be introduced to Aotearoa New Zealand.

== Taxonomy ==
The species was described in 2025 by Cobie Polman-Short, Jem Barratt, David Orlovich and Teresa Lebel. The holotype specimen was collected in 2002 by Teresa Lebel in the South East Corner bioregion of south eastern New South Wales.

== Description ==
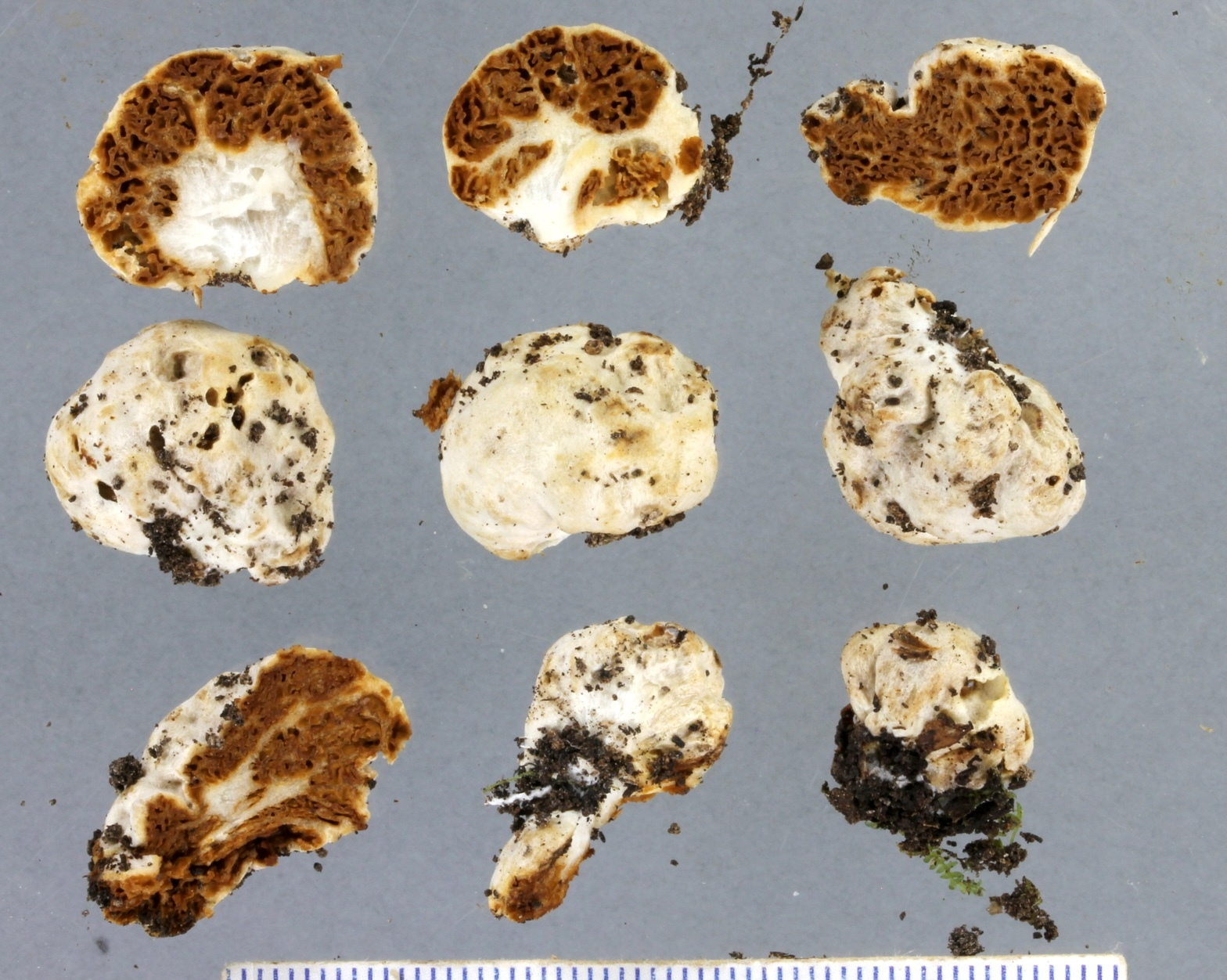
Cortinarius meletlac (specimen OTA73242), showing the branched, tapering stipe-columella in cross section.

This species is sequestrate and produces hypogeal fruiting bodies. The pileus is up to 17 mm in diameter, top-shaped with irregular protrusions of lumps, and may be furrowed towards the base. The pileus is smooth, felty or finely powdery, silvery white to light grey, and darkening when handled. The hymenophore is loculate, with small, irregular, labyrinthine locules that are tawny, chestnut or cinnamon – honey brown becoming dark brown in colour. The white to cream stipe-columella extends into the hymenophoral tissue, may be branched, and tapers from 5 mm wide at the base to < 2 mm at the apex. The stipe context is white, becoming dark yellow upon cutting. The surface or tissues do not show any reaction to the addition of potassium hydroxide. The basidiospores are 7–9.5 μm long and 4.5–6.5 μm wide, ellipse-shaped to somewhat oval-shaped, golden to faint ochre-brown in colour when mounted in potassium hydroxide, with warty ornamentation and a prominent hilar appendage. Cortinarius meletlac is in Cortinarius section Obtusi. It is in a clade with other Australian sequestrate Cortinariaceae, including Cortinarius aff. levisporus, Thaxterogaster walpolensis and Thaxterogaster aff. campbellae. This clade of sequestrate species is sister to several New Zealand agaricoid species, including Cortinarius amblyonis and many undescribed taxa.

== Habitat and distribution ==
Cortinarius meletlac is reported from tall, wet mixed eucalypt forest, Eucalyptus obliqua with Acacia dealbata understory or Eucalyptus regnans with Leptospermum spp. and Eucalyptus rough bark in Eastern Australia. It is also found at Orokonui Ecosanctuary in the South Island of New Zealand, where it grows under introduced Eucalyptus regnans. Its restricted distribution in New Zealand and association with an introduced host indicates it may have been introduced to that country.

== Etymology ==
The specific epithet meletlac derives from the Latin mel meaning honey, et meaning and, and lac meaning milk (literal translation "milk and honey"). This refers to the milky colour of the pileus and cinnamon/honey colour of the hymenial tissue.

== See also ==
- List of Cortinarius species
