= Orokonui Ecosanctuary =

Fenced wildlife sanctuary north of Dunedin, New Zealand

- Te Korowai o Mihiwaka
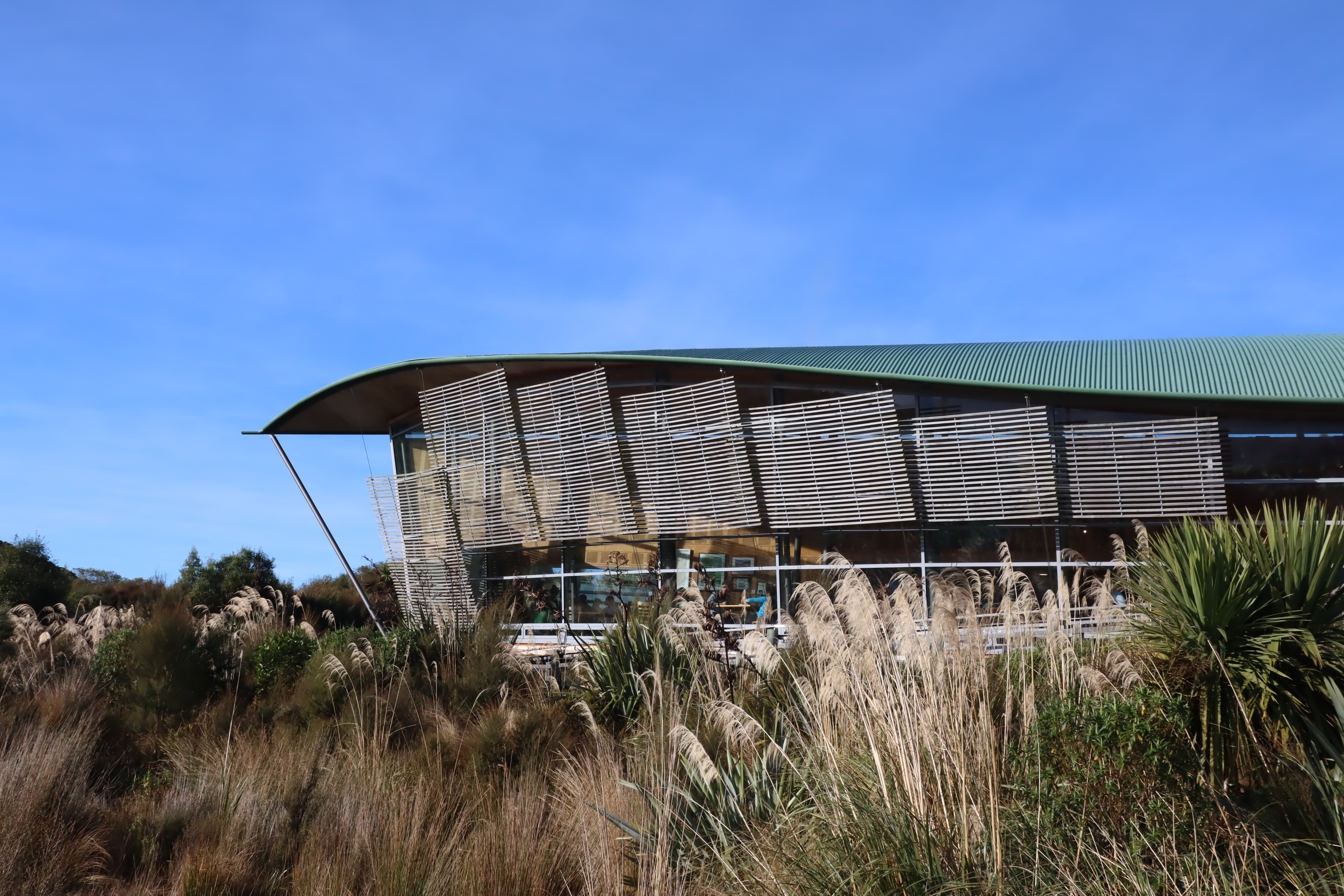
- Orokonui Ecosanctuary visitor centre
- Interactive map of Orokonui Ecosanctuary
- Type: Wildlife reserve
- Location: Orokonui
- Nearest city: Dunedin
- Coordinates: 45.7674°S 170.5967°E
- Area: 307 hectares (760 acres)
- Operator: Otago Natural History Trust
- Visitors: 25,000 p.a.
- Open: 2007
- Status: Open all year
- Hiking trails: Multiple (20 mins - 5 hrs)
- Facilities: Cafe, Visitor Centre
- Website: orokonui.nz

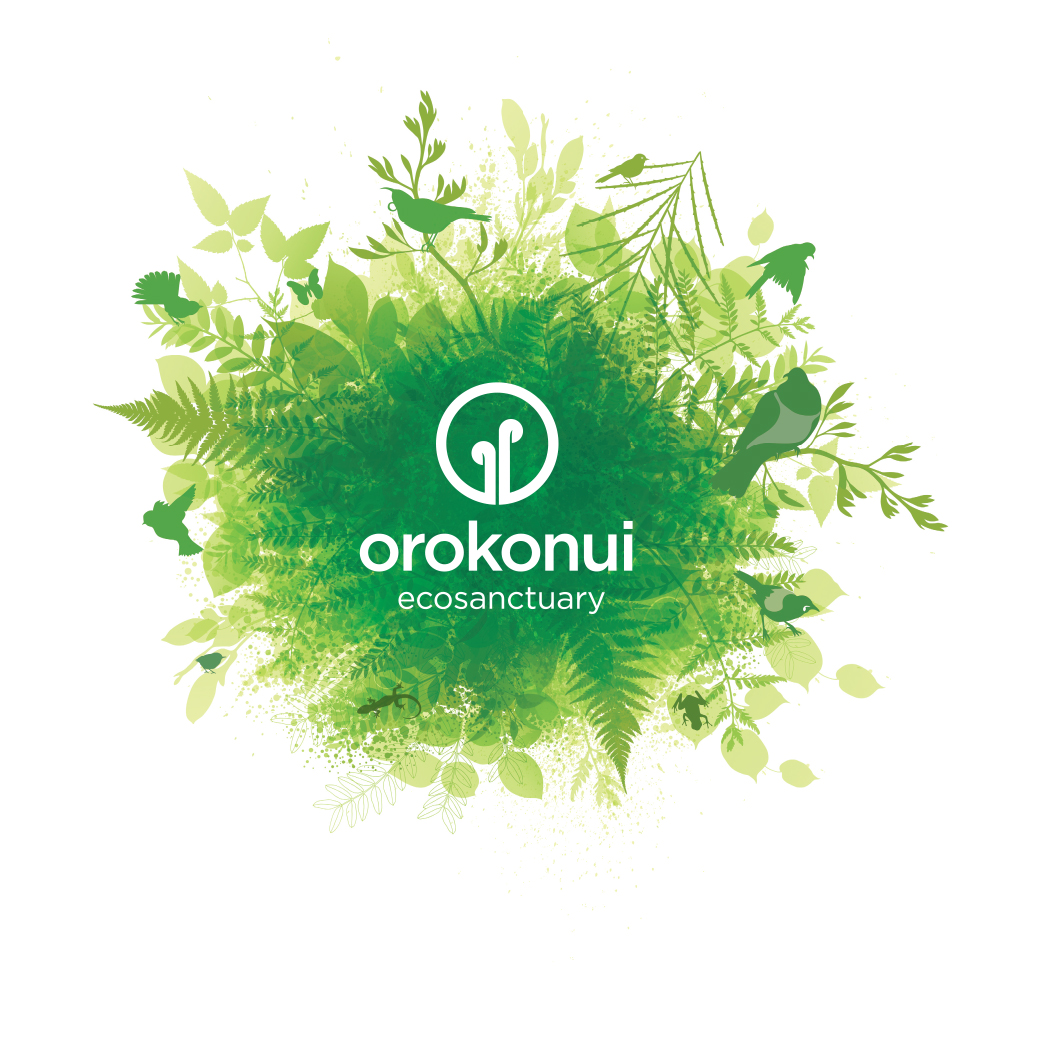

Orokonui Ecosanctuary, called Te Korowai o Mihiwaka in Māori, is an ecological island wildlife reserve developed by the Otago Natural History Trust in the Orokonui Valley between Waitati and Pūrākaunui, New Zealand, 20 kilometres (12 mi) to the north of central Dunedin.

== History and planning ==
=== Formation of the trust ===
The idea of a sanctuary near Dunedin was first discussed in 1982 by New Zealand cartoonist Burton Silver and a few friends. The group made a proposal in July 1983 to convert a Dunedin fertiliser factory into a giant aviary. The proposal was later abandoned but inspired the formation in August 1983 of a charitable trust, the Otago Natural History Trust. Their initial proposal for a sanctuary at Orokonui lapsed and the group disbanded for a while until 1995, when the Karori Wildlife Sanctuary opened in Wellington. This gave the idea renewed impetus and a remaining trust member, Ralph Allen revived the proposal. The local Maori Runaka, Kati Huirapa of Puketeraki became supporters of the trust.

=== Site ===
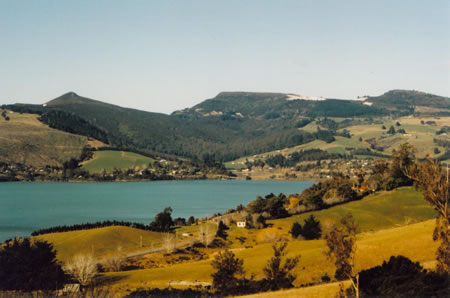
View across Blueskin Bay towards the forested Orokonui Valley

The Ecosanctuary is in a north-facing valley comprising about 290 hectares (720 acres) of regenerating native forest. The trust gained the use of the 230 hectares (570 acres) Orokonui Conservation Area 20 km (12 mi) north of central Dunedin. The New Zealand Department of Conservation approved the trust's use of the land and completed a heads of agreement and the Orokonui site was visited on 27 April 2006 by Chris Carter, the New Zealand Minister of Conservation. The trust purchased and added a further 67 hectares (170 acres) of adjacent land to the Conservation Area. The donation of 57 hectares (140 acres) from an adjacent landowner extended the proposed Ecosanctuary area by 20%.

In May 2007, the trust announced that the sanctuary might expand in future onto adjacent public land.

=== Fundraising ===
A fundraising appeal was launched in November 2005. The trust ran two public fundraising campaigns in 2006-2007: the public were urged to donate their soon-to-be-withdrawn New Zealand 5-cent coins while a "sponsor a fencepost" campaign was run in conjunction with the Otago Daily Times newspaper.

The trust also has a number of mostly Dunedin-based businesses and charities as sponsors. The major funders are a local gambling organisation and the Otago Regional Council.

== Construction and development ==
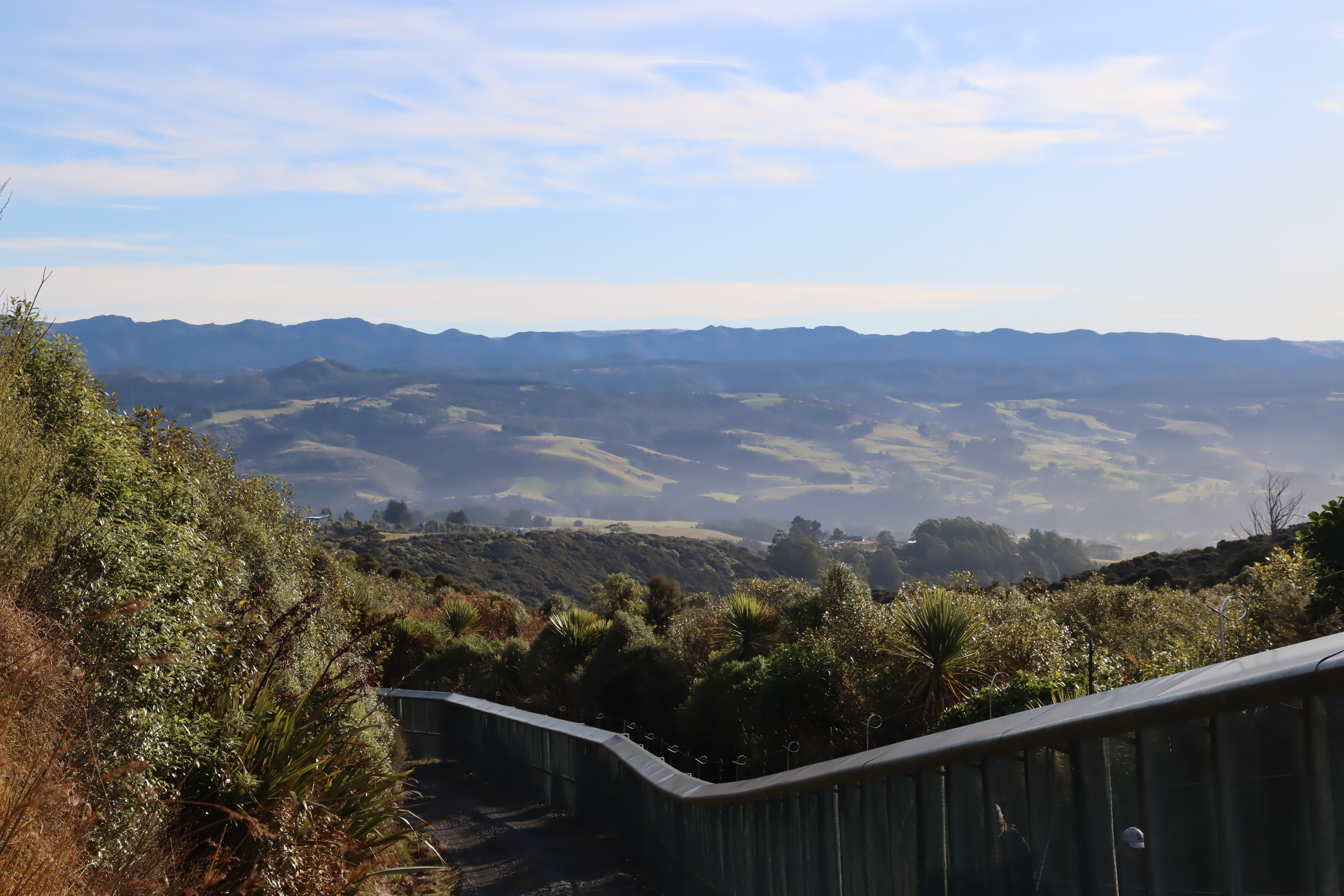
Part of the pest-exclusion fence surrounding the Orokonui Ecosanctuary

=== Enclosure ===
In December 2006 work started on building a 9 km (5.6 mi) long specialised pest-exclusion fence, to enclose 307 ha (760 acres) of regenerating forest. The 1.9-metre (6 ft 3 in) high fence is designed to keep out all introduced mammals such as cats, possums, rats, stoats, ferrets and even mice. It uses stainless steel mesh that continues down to form a skirt at ground level that prevents animals from burrowing under it. On the top is a curved steel hood that prevents climbing animals like cats and possums from climbing over the top.

Waterways are protected by screened culverts nicknamed "watergates", while pedestrian access is by airlock style double gates.

In February 2007, a donation of a further 57 ha (140 acres) from an adjacent landowner increased the planned 7.2 km (4.5 mi) length of fence by 2 km (1.2 mi). The additional land was mainly pine plantation but considered to be of benefit as the trees when felled would give a good habitat for huhu grubs, an important food source for kākā.

Earthworks for the fence were finished in May 2007. The fence was completed and the sanctuary officially "closed" on 3 July 2007 in the presence of the Waitati Militia.

=== Pest eradication ===
Pest eradication commenced in August 2007 with shooting of goats and 800 possums by ground-based teams. This was immediately followed by the scattering from aircraft of bait poisoned with brodifacoum into the fenced area. The trust's consent application states that when the valley is free of pests, the health of the forest will improve, leading to an increase in seedlings, flowers, seeds, invertebrates and thus increased food supply to birds (p4). There is some evidence that forest health is improving.

=== Habitat improvement ===
Other work involves planting of native seedlings raised at a nearby tree nursery and piling up rocks to create habitats for lizards.

=== Species introduction ===
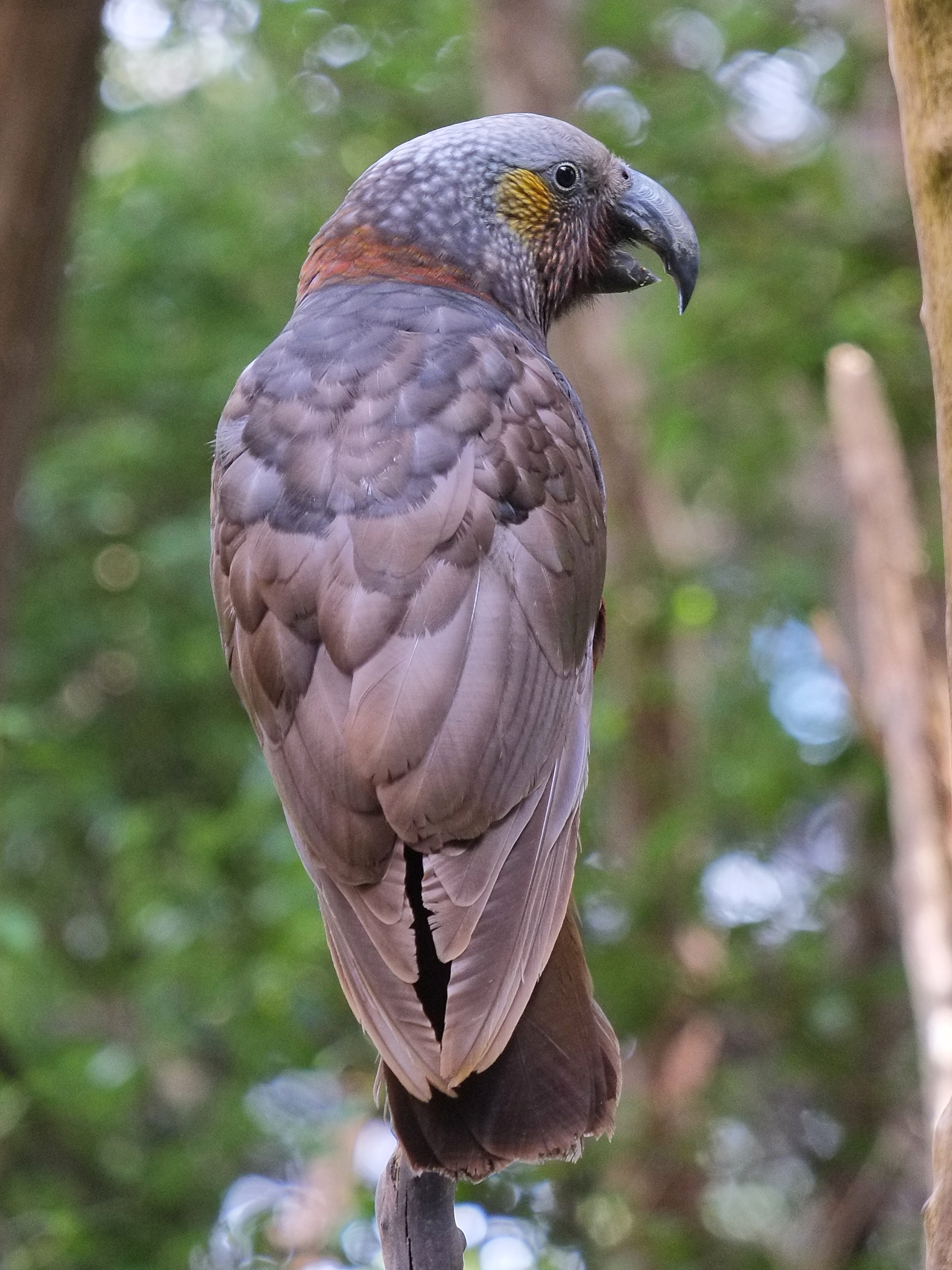
Kākā were the first species to be introduced

The trust plans to "bring back to the ecosanctuary native species that would have been there in times past" including kiwi, seabirds, kākāriki, South Island robin, South Island saddleback, kākā, native bats, tuatara and jewelled gecko. In July 2007, four South Island kākā arrived. Initially housed in an aviary, these were the first animals to be introduced to the Ecosanctuary. Pūkeko and paradise duck have self-introduced since enclosure and habitat works. Fifteen tuatara were moved from the University of Otago in March 2009, and 34 South Island saddleback were introduced to the sanctuary the following month.

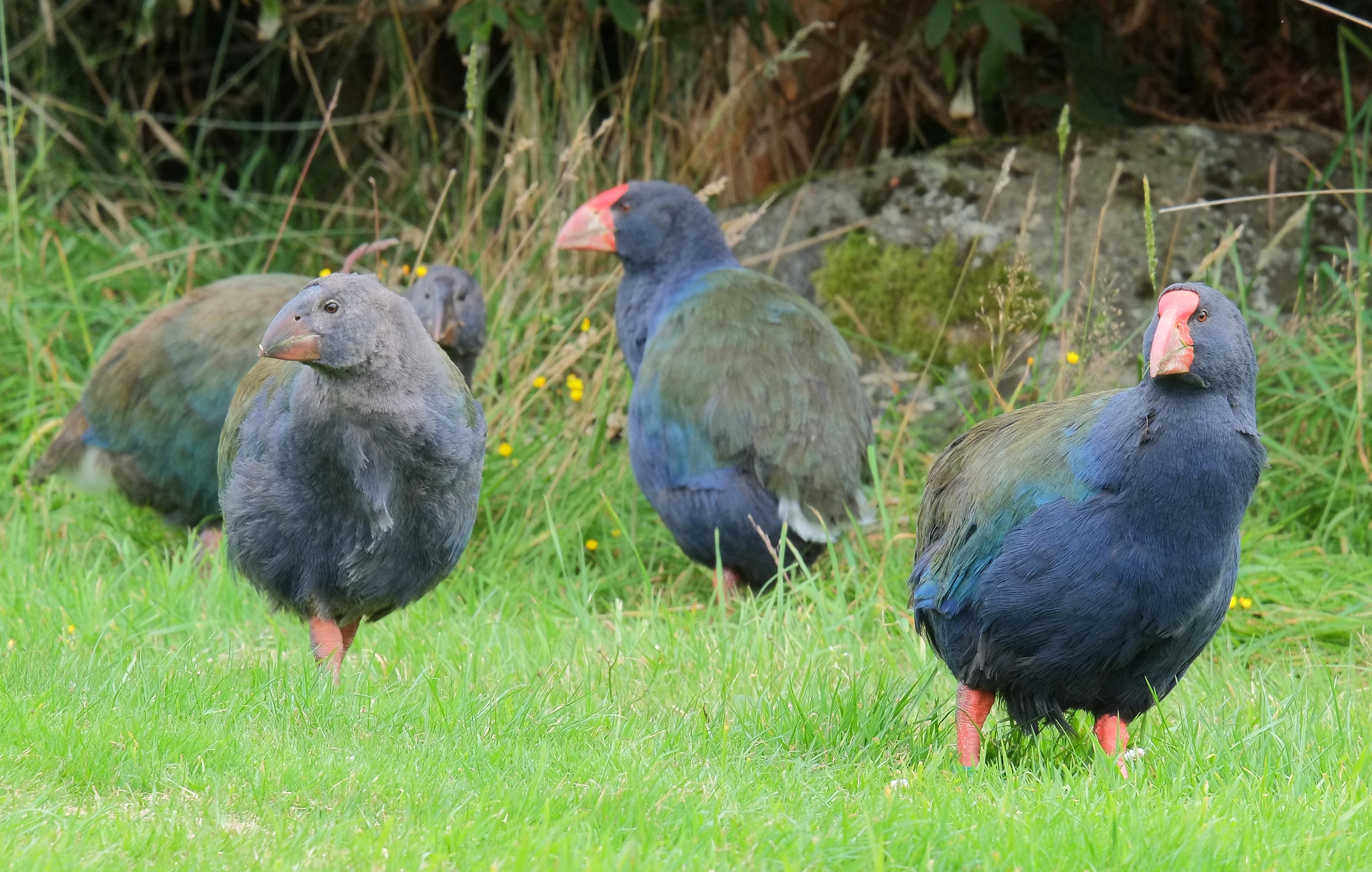
Takahē pair with two juveniles

The Ecosanctuary is also home to a breeding pair of South Island takahē, Quammen and Paku.

=== Visitor facilities ===
The promoters of the sanctuary anticipate 25,000 visitors per year. Following considerable debate they chose a site at the top of the valley system for visitor facilities, for its potential to attract visitors, its access and perceived low costs and "benefits for management of both ecology and visitors". Here they built a NZD1.9 million visitor and education centre which they label as being a "showpiece of environmentally sustainable design".

The chosen site "is on a road that is likely to become part of the Southern Scenic Route, with relatively slow-moving traffic that will be able to see the visitor centre and stop to investigate", with road links to Port Chalmers, Waitati, Dunedin and State Highway 1.

== Land history ==
The Orokonui Valley was once part of a school, Orakanui College. Later, after closure, the grounds were acquired by the Government as an "inebriates' home." They were subsequently cut-over and grazed, and partially planted in Eucalyptus regnans, one of which is New Zealand's tallest measured tree, the 82.25 metres (269.8 ft) "Frank Pepers Tree". The former school and rehab property was divided. The agricultural land was vested in Landcorp and the major part of the land was managed as the Orokonui Conservation Area by DOC.
