= Ecological island =

Micro-habitat within a larger ecosystem

An ecological island is a term used in New Zealand, and increasingly in Australia, to refer to an area of land (not necessarily an actual island) isolated by natural or artificial means from the surrounding land, where a natural micro-habitat exists amidst a larger differing ecosystem. In New Zealand the term is used to refer to one of several types of nationally protected areas.

In artificial ecological islands (also known as mainland islands):

- all non-native species (at least predator species) have been eradicated,
- native species are reintroduced and nurtured, and
- the natural or artificial border is maintained to prevent reintroduction of non-native species.

The ultimate goal is to recreate an ecological microcosm of the country as a whole as it was before human arrival. There is usually provision for controlled public access, and scientific study and research.

The definition does not include land within a fence erected to:

- protect farm animals from wild predators
- protect a specific species from specific predators
- exclude farm animals only
- exclude native animals (although some native animals, weka for example, may need to be excluded during a species' recovery phase).

== Background ==
The concept of mainland islands was pioneered in New Zealand and arose mainly from the particular circumstances of that country's history. For millions of years New Zealand was part of the supercontinent Gondwanaland, which included Australia, Africa, and South America, and shared the same flora and fauna. About 70 million years ago New Zealand became separated, earlier than Australia, South America and Antarctica. About five million years later non-avian dinosaurs became globally extinct leaving the way open to mammals to dominate - except in New Zealand where there were no land mammals (only 3 species of bats and seals). In the absence of mammals, birds became dominant. Evolutionary processes resulted in a unique assemblage of plants and animals, and New Zealand became a land dominated by birds. Without competition from browsing mammals, birds evolved to occupy niches that mammals occupied elsewhere. Threatened by few predators, many birds had no need to fly and many species became flightless. Birds, reptiles, plants, insects, and bats, all evolved in the absence of terrestrial mammals, and have little defence against alien species.

With human colonisation came many accidental or deliberate introductions of mammals and birds. These wrought havoc with native species and many became extinct, many others were reduced in range and number, with some teetering on extinction. Traditionally pacific rats (Rattus exulans), Norway rats (Rattus norveigucus), ship rats (Rattus rattus) cats, ferrets, stoats, and weasels were all considered to be the main culprits in the decline of native species of New Zealand birds, reptiles and insects. More recent information adds hedgehogs and mice to the list. These species have been introduced for a variety of reasons and some inadvertently. The effect remains the same: they have all contributed to the decline of native animals. Possums and deer did the same for the forest.

However, New Zealand also includes many offshore islands, some of which contained species rare or extinct on the mainland because introduced pests could not reach them.

== Offshore islands ==
Increasingly over the last hundred years, New Zealand's Department of Conservation together with many volunteers have developed and perfected world-first methods of clearing some of these islands of all introduced pests, and island restoration, creating safe havens for the reintroduction of at-risk species, thereby saving them from extinction. These islands are also used to expand the range of rare species so that an ecological disaster on one island would not result in the total extinction of a species. As many species rebound in numbers in the absence of predators the islands act as species reservoirs enabling the periodic removal of some to create breeding colonies on other cleared islands, or on the mainland itself.

== Fenced enclosures ==
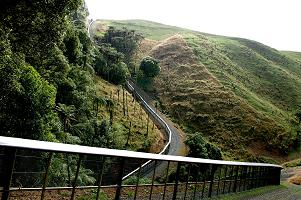
Xcluder pest-exclusion fence around perimeter of Maungatautari.

Following the example of what had been achieved on offshore islands, groups of New Zealanders decided to create artificial ecological islands on the mainland so that the public could have easier access and learn what New Zealand looked and sounded like before human colonisation. There are excellent projects where alien species numbers are kept down by various methods other than a pest-exclusion fence or the coastline, but these are not generally described as ecological islands.

Projects that do meet the criteria, or are aiming to, include:

- New Zealand
  - 1999 Zealandia
  - 2004 Tawharanui Open Sanctuary
  - 2005 Bushy Park
  - 2006 Maungatautari Restoration Project
  - 2007 Orokonui Ecosanctuary
  - 2008 Lake Rotokare Scenic Reserve
  - 2009 Glenfern Sanctuary Charitable Trust
  - 2011 Shakespear Regional Park
  - 2016 Brook Waimārama Sanctuary
  - Moehau Environment Group
- Australia
  - 2015 Nangak Tamboree Wildlife Sanctuary

== See also ==
- Biodiversity of New Zealand
- Conservation in New Zealand
- Invasive species in New Zealand
- Exclosure
