= Pest-exclusion fence =

Barrier built to exclude certain types of animal pests

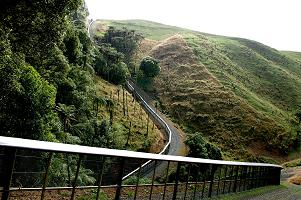
Xcluder pest-exclusion fence around the perimeter of Sanctuary Mountain Maungatautari in New Zealand

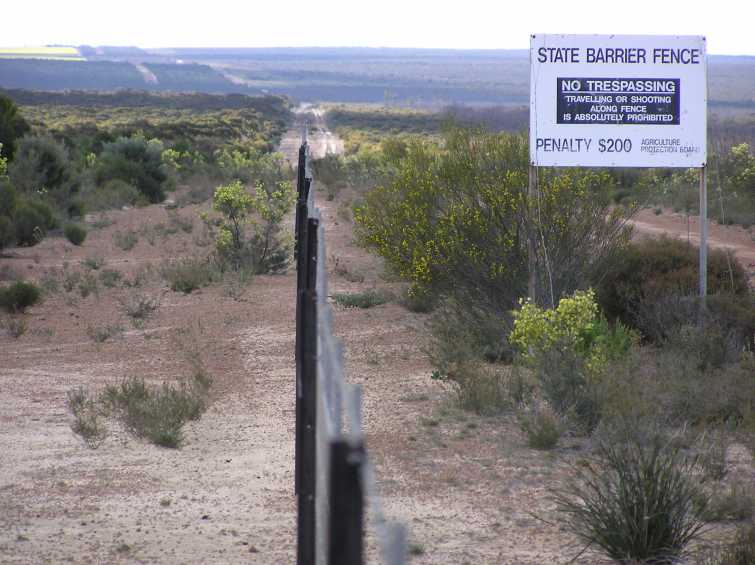
Photo of the Rabbit-proof fence in northern Australia, taken in 2005

A pest-exclusion fence is a barrier that is built to exclude certain types of animal pests from an enclosure. This may be to protect plants in horticulture, preserve grassland for grazing animals, separate species carrying diseases (vector species) from livestock, prevent troublesome species entering roadways, or to protect endemic species in nature reserves. These fences are not necessarily traditional wire barriers, but may also include barriers of sound, or smell.

== Design techniques ==
Animals can be excluded by a fence's height, depth under the ground and mesh size. It is also important to choose a construction material that cannot be climbed; furthermore, sometimes it is necessary to create a subsurface fencing element to prevent burrowing under the fence. Fences are usually designed with the target pest species (the species to be excluded) in mind, and the fences are made to effectively exclude those species. This results in a wide variety of designs for pest exclusion fences (see examples below). Often the fence is encircled in electric wire to ensure that animals can not climb over the fence.

=== Examples ===
- The 1.9m-high fence at the Orokonui Ecosanctuary in Waitati, New Zealand is designed to keep out all introduced mammals such as possums, rats, stoats, ferrets and even mice. It uses stainless steel mesh that continues down to form a skirt at ground level that prevents animals from burrowing under it. On the top is a curved steel hood that prevents climbers like cats and possums from climbing over the top.
- Agricultural exclusion fences in central-western Queensland vary between 1.6m and 2m in height. The fences have a single top barbed wire and ring-lock or hinge-joint wire underneath and steel fence posts. The ring-lock or hinge joint wire has smaller holes at the bottom, gradually increasing in size to be marginally larger at the top. A section of this mesh lays flat against the ground at the bottom of the posts to form a skirt (or radial-apron) on the outside of the fence.
- In Africa and Asia, crop-raiding elephants are excluded using a variety of techniques. These include electric fencing, fences of cacti, chilli-greased rope, and bee-hives or sounds of disturbed bees.
- Exclusion fences are also used in Australia at sanctuaries run by the Australian Wildlife Conservancy. Inside the fenced off zone captive breeding programs for endangered animals take place.

== Use in Australia ==
=== Barrier fencing ===
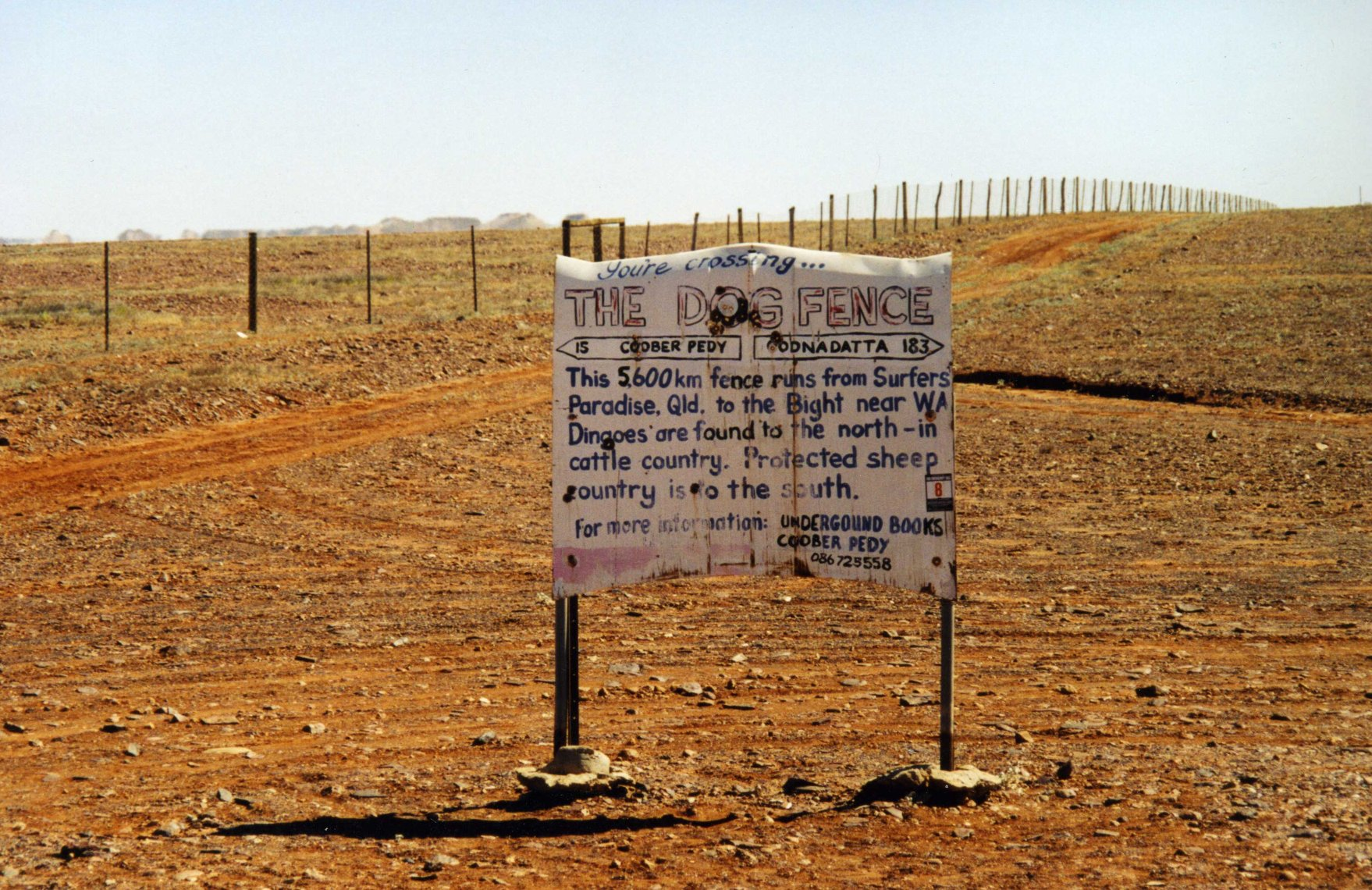
The Dingo Fence near Coober Pedy

Australia has utilised exclusion fencing since the 1860s. The most well known exclusion fences in Australia are the barrier fences. Barrier fences are long (usually linear) barriers erected for the purpose of excluding particular species from large portions of Australia. The most well known barrier fences are the Dingo Fence and the Rabbit-proof fence, but there are many others.

=== Agricultural exclusion fencing ===
In more recent years, pest-exclusion fences have been built around singular properties, or groups of properties. This practice is known as cluster fencing. Cluster fencing allows farmers to monitor and mitigate predation pressure on livestock, and monitor Total Grazing Pressure (TGP) through accurate abundance data of native, pest, and domestic herbivores.

=== Conservation fencing ===
Australia uses pest-exclusion fencing to separate several high-value or threatened species from introduced predators. One such example is Arid Recovery in South Australia, where feral cat, red fox and rabbit have been removed for the conservation of 5 threatened species.

== Use in New Zealand ==
Pest foiled by fence, Zealandia, Wellington, New Zealand

Prior to human settlement New Zealand had no land-based mammals apart from three bat species. The introduced mammal species, such as rabbits, deer, and possum, have since caused huge ecological changes to the biota of New Zealand. Pest-exclusion fences are increasingly used for conservation of indigenous species by excluding all mammals.

Locations of predator-proof fences include:

- Cape Brett
- Cape Farewell
- Deans Bush, Christchurch
- Zealandia, Wellington
- Bushy Park
- Maungatautari Restoration Project
- Orokonui Ecosanctuary
- Shakespear Regional Park
- Styx Mill Reserve, Christchurch (under construction)
- Stewart Island
- Tawharanui Peninsula

== Use in Japan ==
=== Conservation fencing ===
Deer-proof fencing was used in Nagano Prefecture, Japan in a conservation effort to maintain plant diversity. The methods were effective for increasing species richness, but not as effective for conserving rare plants.

== See also ==
- Deer fence
- Dingo fence
- Ecological island
- Exclosure
- Rabbit-proof fence
- Separation barrier
