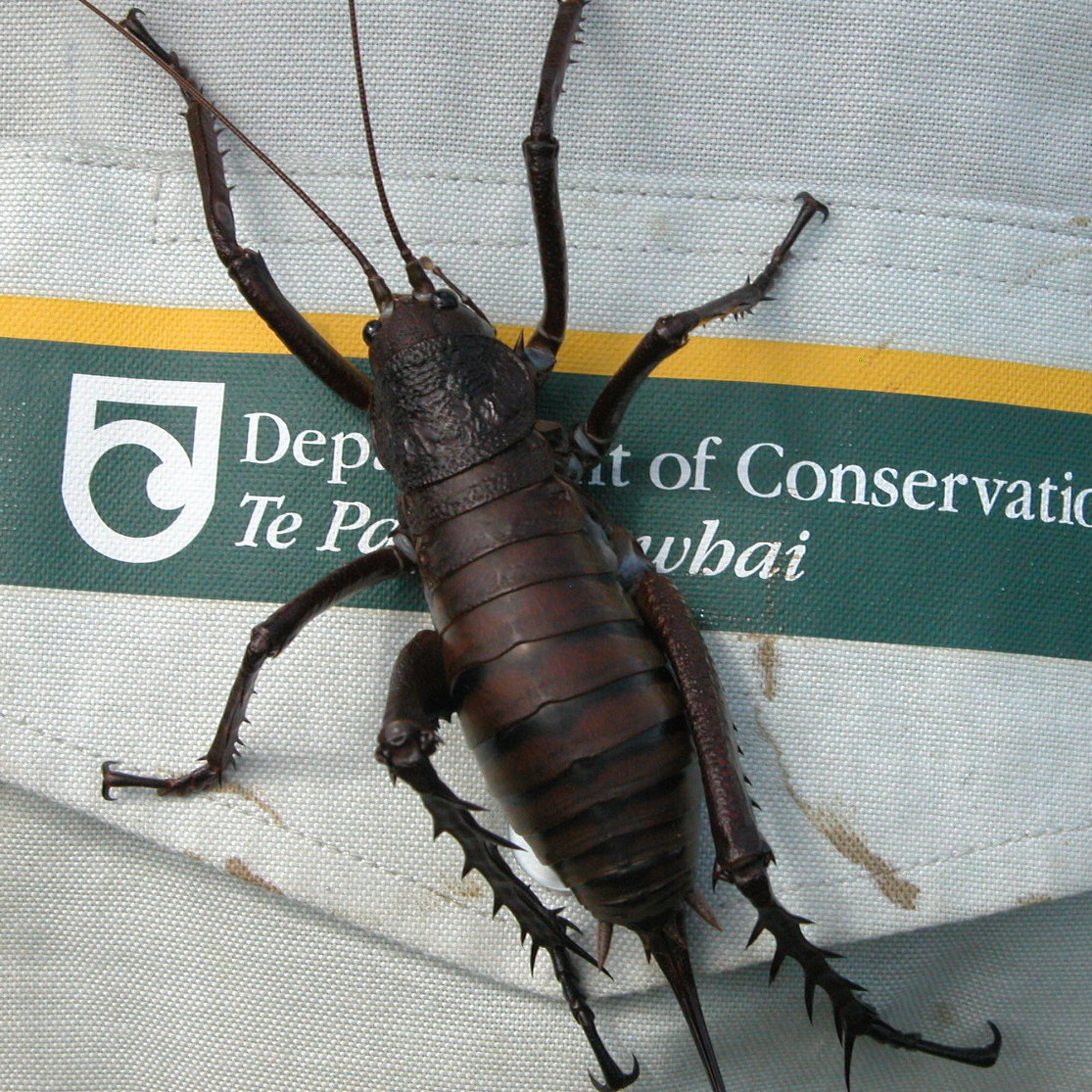

Conservation status
- Nationally Critical (NZ TCS)

Scientific classification
- Kingdom: Animalia
- Phylum: Arthropoda
- Clade: Pancrustacea
- Class: Insecta
- Order: Orthoptera
- Suborder: Ensifera
- Family: Anostostomatidae
- Genus: Deinacrida
- Species: D. mahoenui

Binomial name
- Deinacrida mahoenui Gibbs, 1999
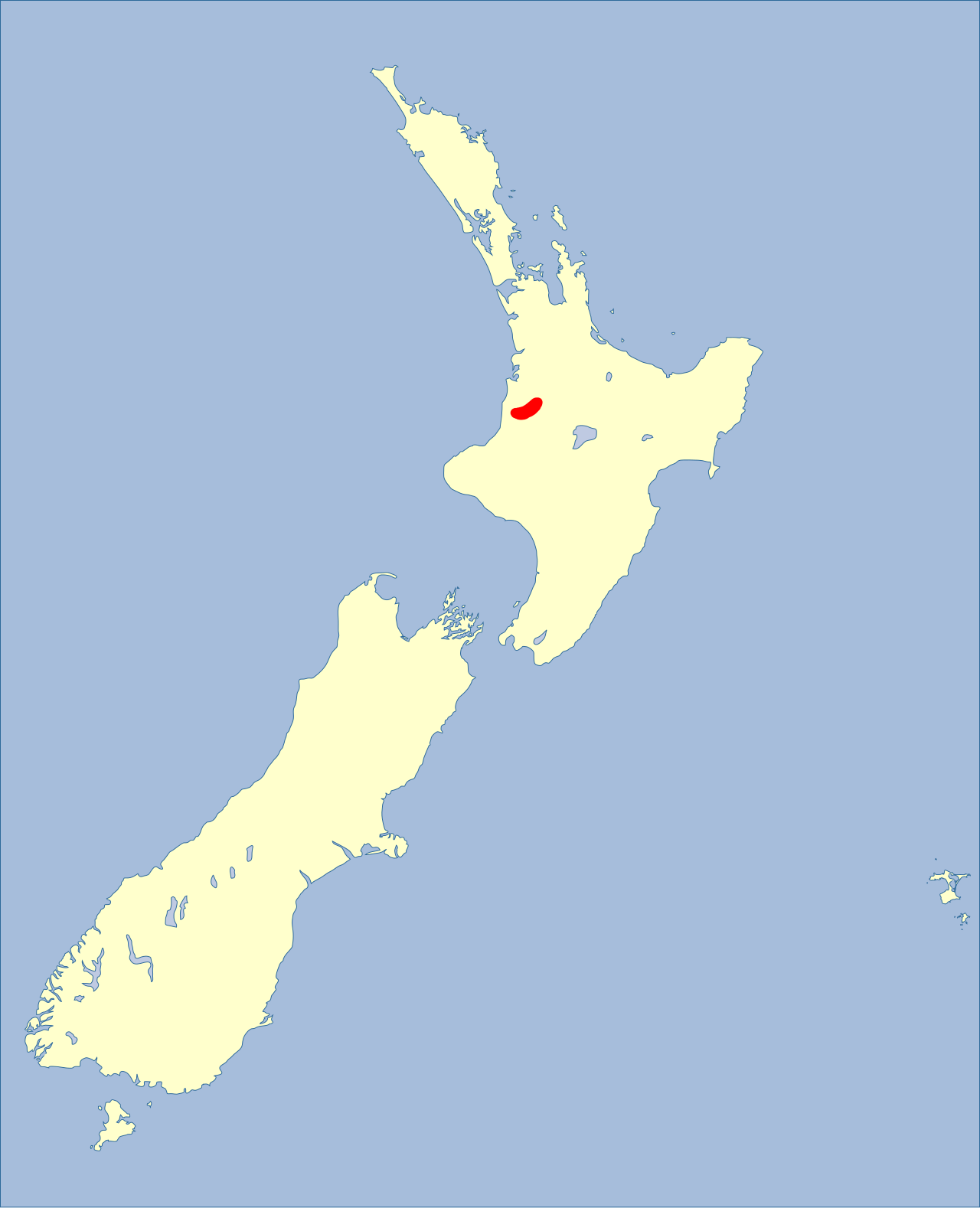

= Deinacrida mahoenui =

Mahoenui giant wētā

Species of orthopteran insect

Deinacrida mahoenui, the Mahoenui giant wētā, is a flightless insect in the giant wētā family Anostostomatidae. It is endemic to the area of Mahoenui, New Zealand, and the world population for some time was restricted to a single patch of introduced gorse on farmland.

== Description ==
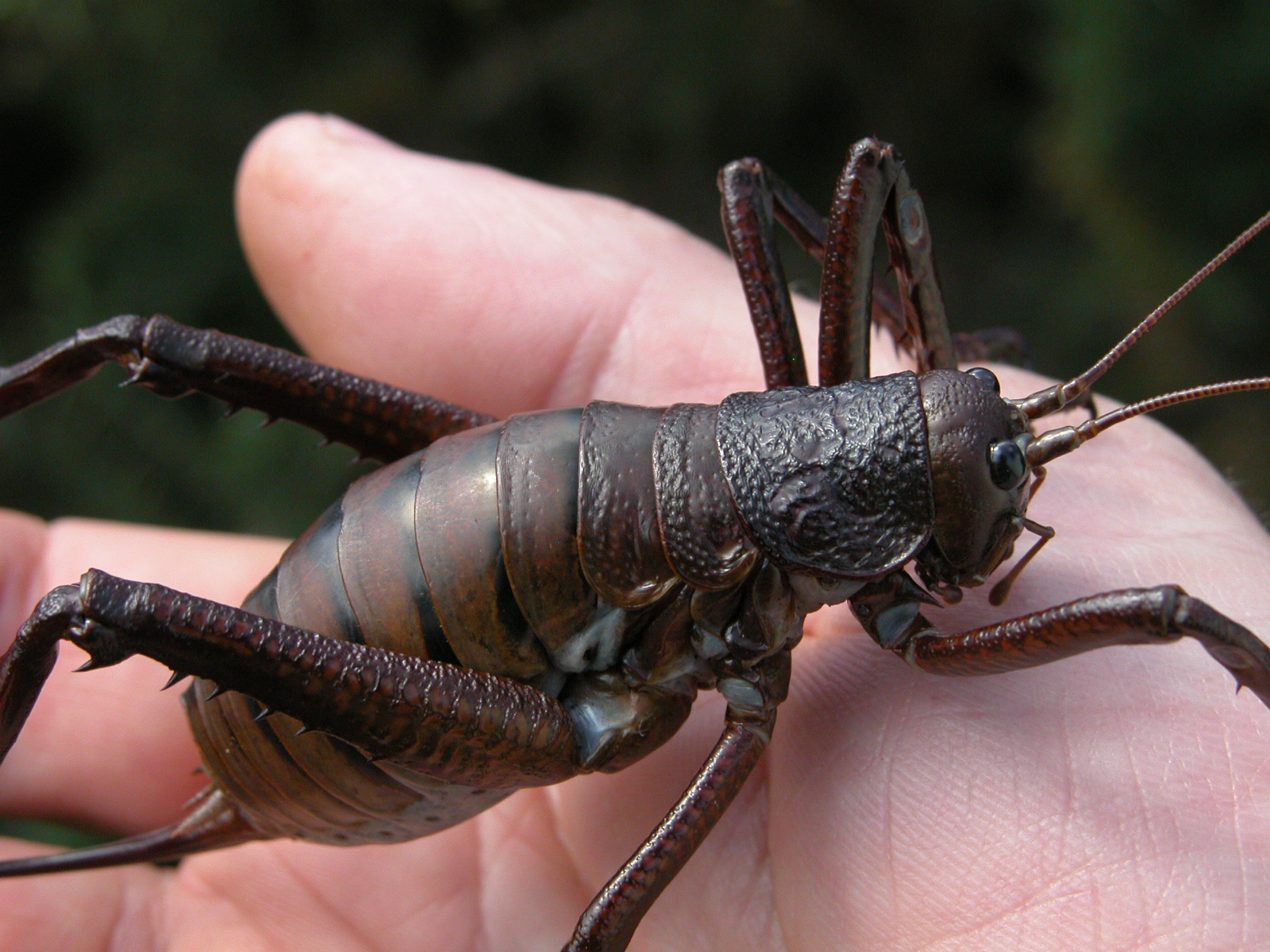
A Mahoenui giant wētā, showing the common dark mahogany colouration. From its ovipositor it is clearly female.

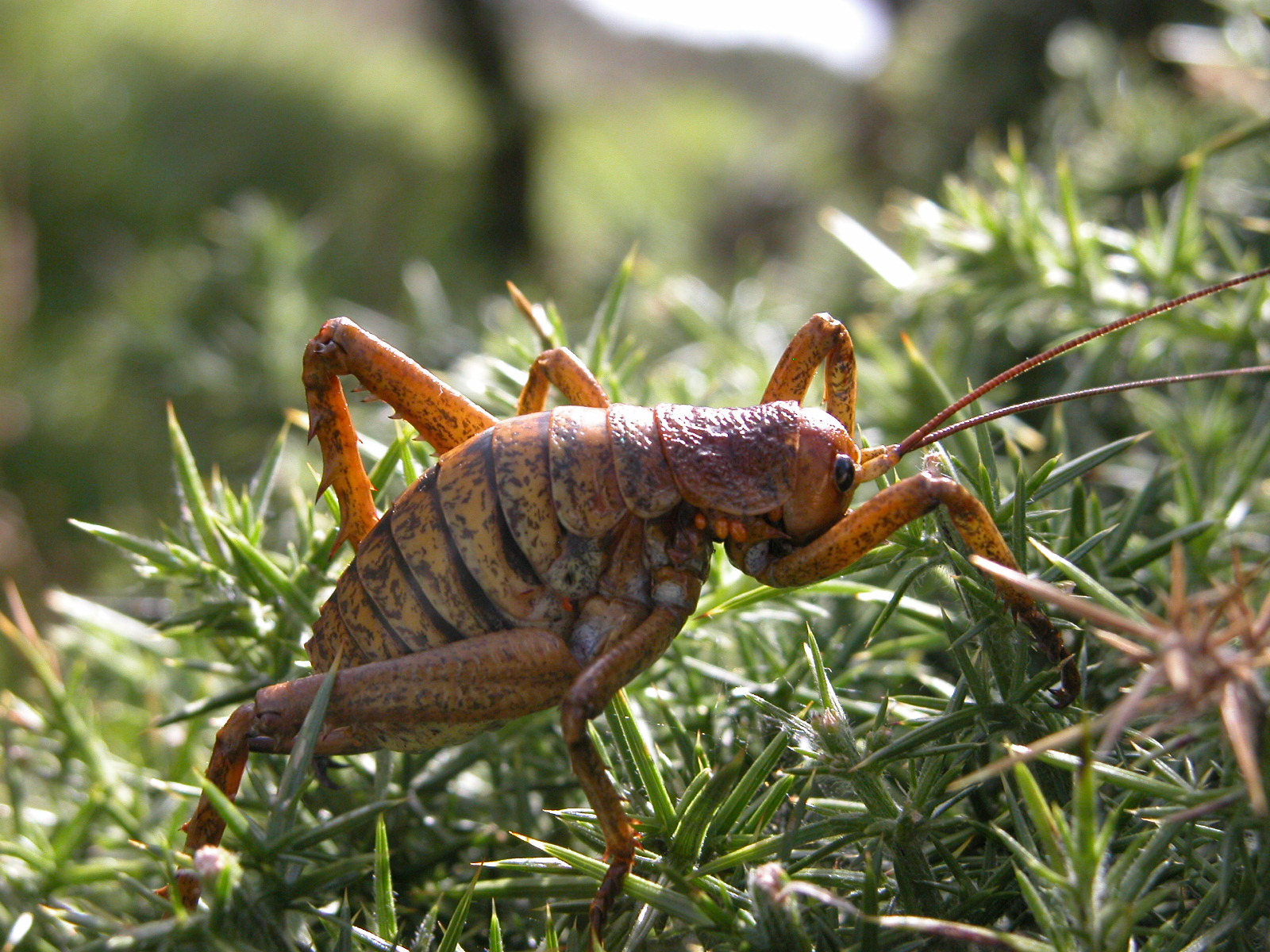
The less-common golden yellow colouration of Deinacrida mahoenui.

Deinacrida mahoenui is a very large flightless insect: individuals can grow to 65 millimetres (2.6 in) in length, and weigh up to 25 grams (0.88 oz). Females are larger, ranging between 20 and 25 grams, while males are generally around 18 to 20 grams. Females can be distinguished by their size and their long egg-laying spikes or ovipositors.

Uniquely amongst giant wētā, D. mahoenui has two colour morphs: mahogany brown (over two thirds of the population) and golden yellow (about 31%). A two-coloured female has even been found, having one side brown and the other yellow.

== Reproduction ==
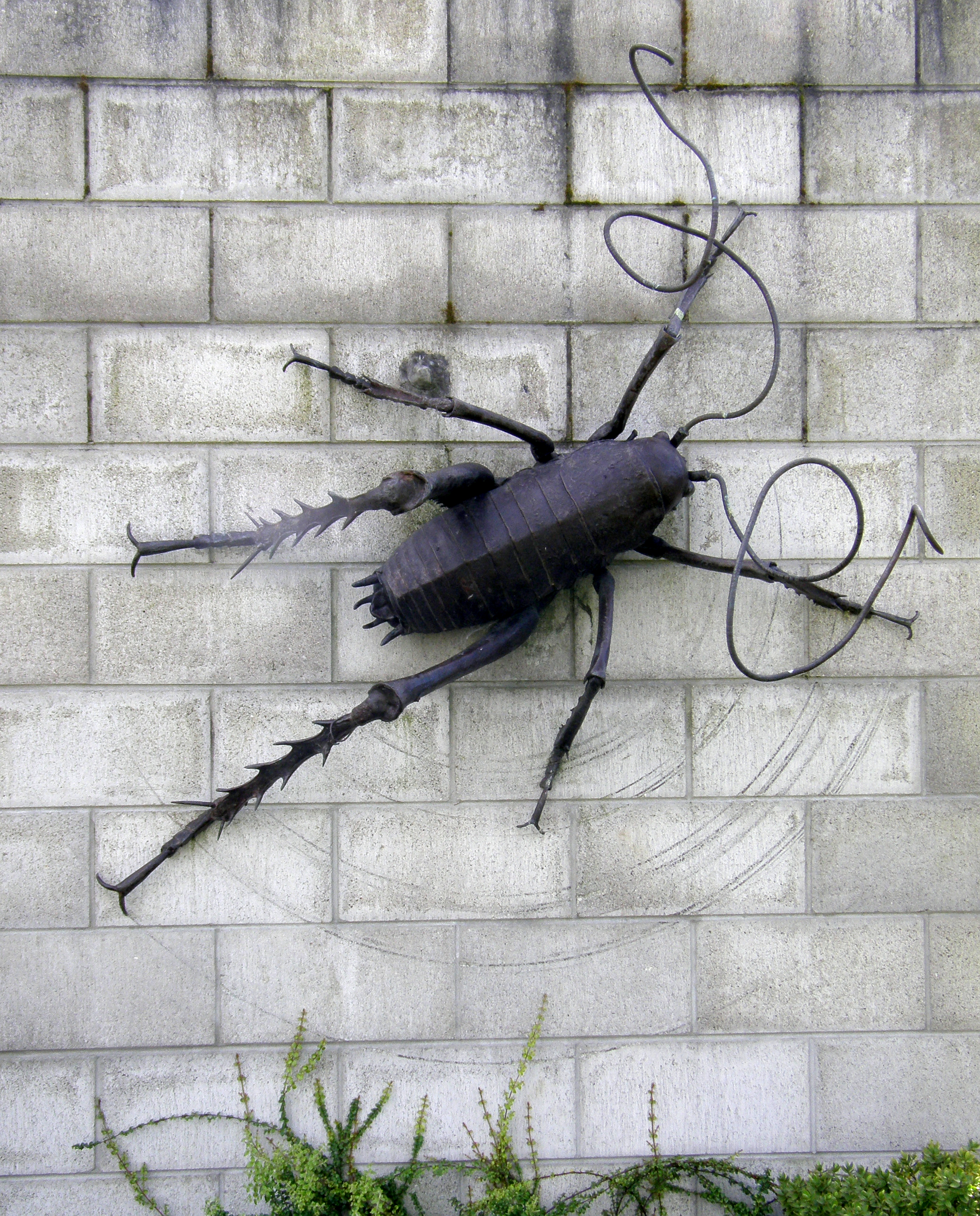
Sculpture of a Mahoenui giant wētā (Deinacrida mahoenui) on the main street of Te Kūiti, New Zealand

Female Mahoenui giant wētā lay 200–400 eggs, burying them about 25 mm deep into the soil with their ovipositor. The eggs are about 7 mm long, and can take anywhere from 10 months upto 2 years to hatch, with the 8 mm nymphs emerging from December or April. Nymphs grow rapidly, eating other insects (they are cannibalistic) as well as leaves, bark, and leaf litter. They shed their exoskeleton every 4-6 weeks, going through 10 instars.

Once they reach maturity, Females signal they are ready to mate with pheromones in their droppings. Males follow this scent and caress the females with their antennae before mating takes place. Their life cycle in total lasts 3-4 years, very short compared to some other species of large wētā which can live for over 10 years in captivity.

== Habitat ==
These giant wētā were first discovered living in tiny (1–5 hectare) remnants of tawa forest at Mahoenui, a small community in New Zealand's King Country. In 1987 a larger population was found nearby, living in farmland covered with introduced gorse. An area of 240 hectares (590 acres) of gorse was purchased by the Department of Conservation to create a wētā reserve.

Gorse is an invasive weed in New Zealand pasture, and not the wētā's natural habitat, but in combination with introduced livestock it had formed a refuge for the species. Cattle had opened out the gorse canopy, and browsing by goats have cropped it into thick hedges, impenetrable to the introduced rats that are the main threat to D. mahoenui.

== Conservation ==
External videos
- Meet the Locals (2007 TVNZ video about D. mahoenui)

Like most species of giant wētā, D. mahoenui are very vulnerable to introduced mammalian predators such as cats, stoats, possums, rats, and hedgehogs. The Mahoenui Giant Weta Scientific Reserve is also extremely vulnerable to fire, as gorse is very flammable.

Since 1989, more than 2,000 D. mahoenui have been relocated to seven mainland and island areas, but appear to be thriving at just two of these sites.

The only breeding program for this specific species is located at the Ōtorohanga Kiwi House.

Some have been released near Waitomo Caves at Ruakuri Scenic Reserve, 200 were put onto Mahurangi Island near the Coromandel Peninsula, and 287 were released at Warrenheip, a 16 ha private reserve near Cambridge. In April 2012 up to 100 were introduced into the Maungatautari ecological area, with a further 193 released there in August 2025. Another 100 individuals were released into the Rotokare Sanctuary in Taranaki in November 2025.
