= Zealandia (wildlife sanctuary) =

Protected natural area in Wellington, New Zealand

- Te Māra a Tāne
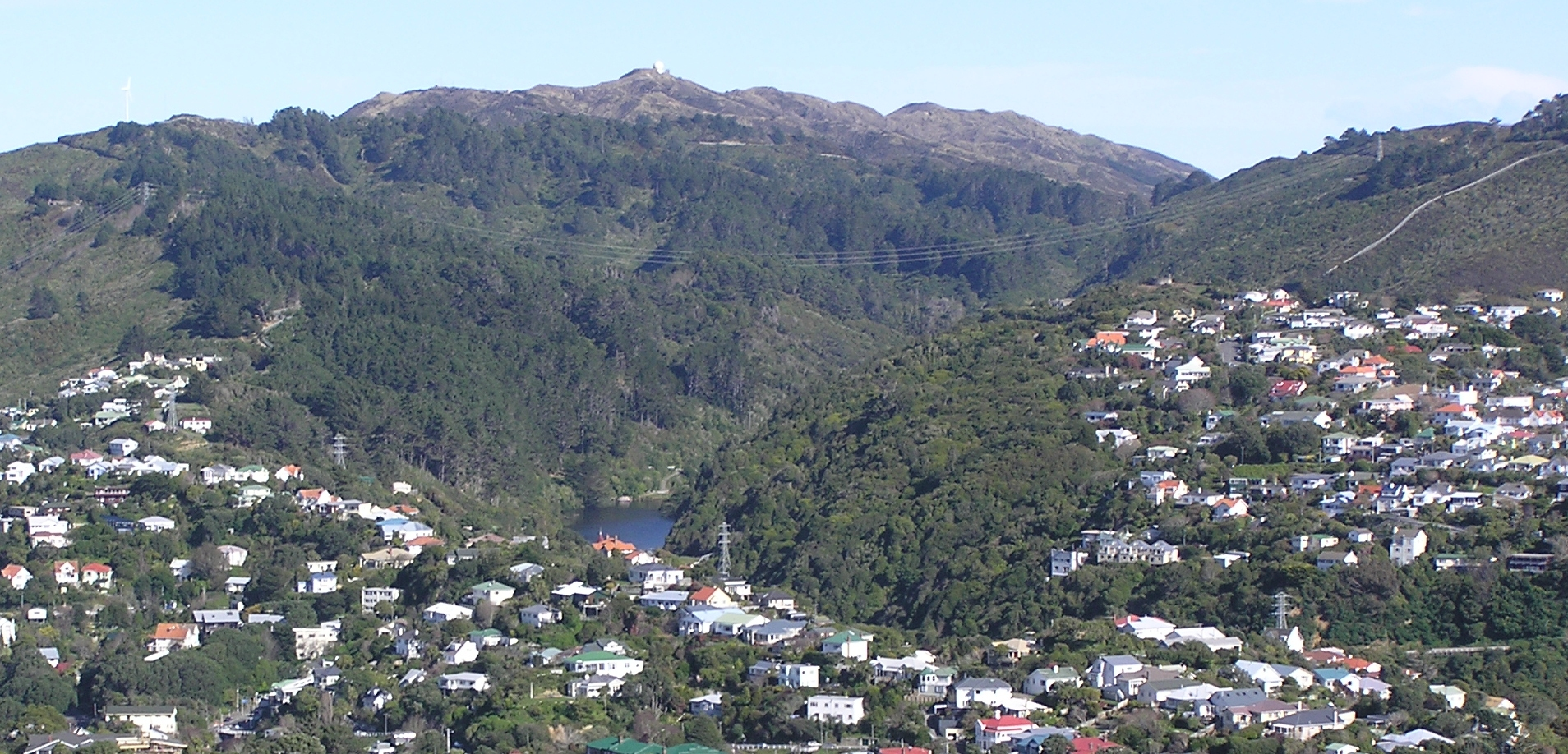
- Zealandia on the edge of suburban Wellington
- Interactive map of Zealandia
- Type: Wildlife sanctuary
- Location: Wellington, New Zealand
- Coordinates: 41°17′40″S 174°45′00″E
- Area: 225 ha (560 acres)
- Created: 1999
- Owner: Wellington City Council
- Operator: Karori Sanctuary Trust
- Open: 9am to 5pm all year around except 25 December.
- Website: www.visitzealandia.com

Zealandia (Māori: Te Māra a Tāne, lit. 'the garden of Tāne'), formerly known as the Karori Wildlife Sanctuary, is a protected natural area in Wellington, New Zealand, the first urban completely fenced ecosanctuary, where the biodiversity of 225 ha (just under a square mile) of forest is being restored. The full name is Zealandia Te Māra a Tāne, often shortened to Zealandia. The sanctuary was previously part of the water catchment area for Wellington, between Wrights Hill (bordering Karori) and the Brooklyn wind turbine on Polhill.

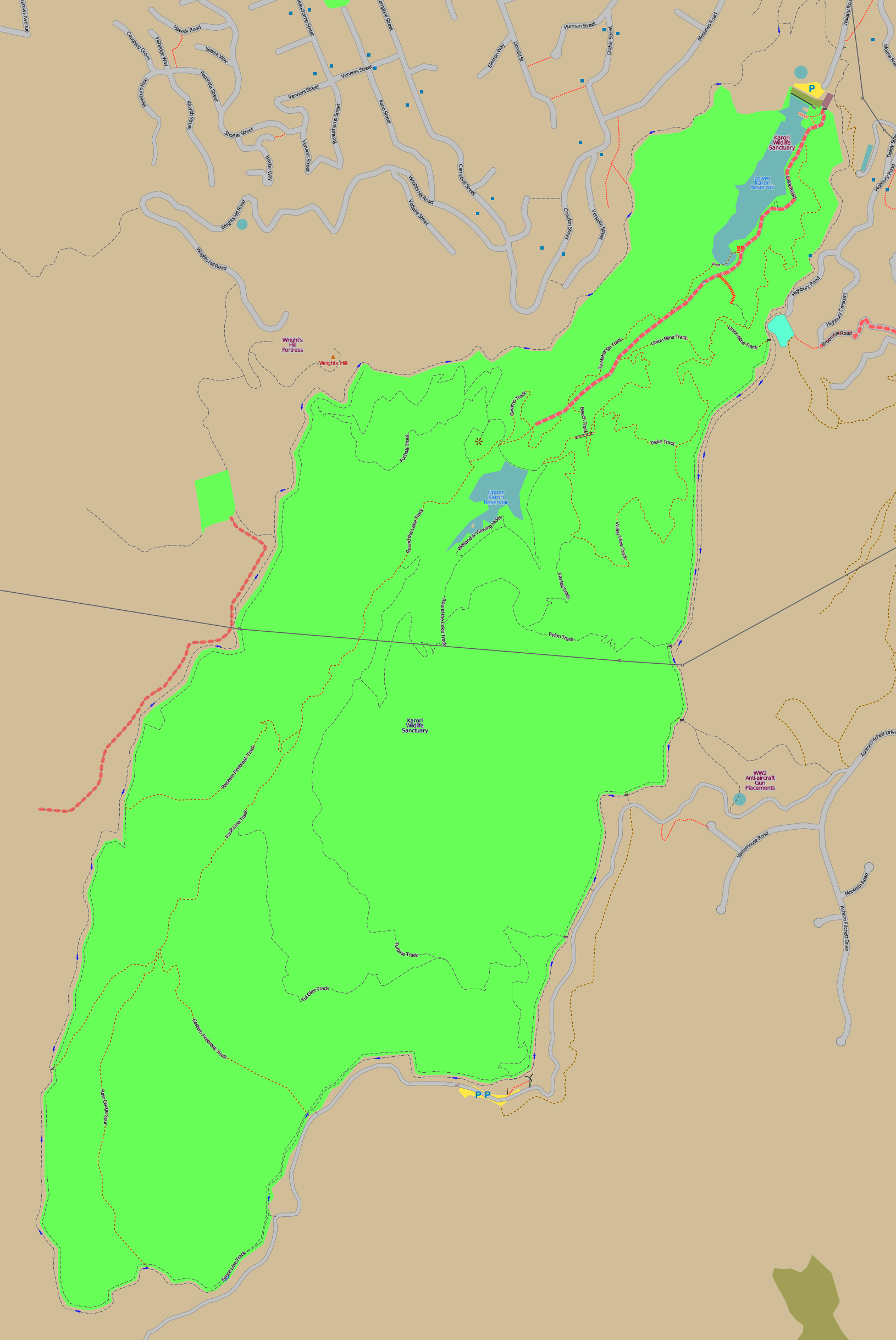
Map of Zealandia

Most of New Zealand's ecosystems have been severely modified by the introduction of land mammals that were not present during the evolution of its ecosystems, and have had a devastating impact on both native flora and fauna. The sanctuary, surrounded by a pest-exclusion fence, is an example of an ecological island, which allows the original natural ecosystems to recover by minimising the impact of introduced flora and fauna.

The sanctuary has become a significant tourist attraction in Wellington and is responsible for the greatly increased number of sightings of species such as tūī and kākā in city's suburbs.

Sometimes described as the world's first mainland island sanctuary in an urban environment, the sanctuary has inspired many similar projects throughout New Zealand, with predator-proof fences now protecting the biodiversity of many other areas of forest. Examples include the 7.7-hectare (19-acre) lowland podocarp forest remnant of Riccarton bush/Putaringamotu, the 98-hectare (240-acre) Bushy Park, and the 3,500-hectare (8,600-acre) Maungatautari Restoration Project enclosing an entire mountain.

== History ==
The area of Zealandia was originally covered with broadleaf forest until European settlement of the area that included large fires in 1850 and 1860 that cleared the land to be used for farming. Historically about 60% of the Wellington region was covered with this broadleaf forest. Karaka, kohekohe, ngaio and nīkau trees were common but there were also rātā, rewarewa and tawa with occasional podocarps like kahikatea and rimu.

Following the discovery of alluvial gold in the Kaiwharawhara stream in 1869, there was a small gold rush in the area. This was soon replaced by quartz mines, but poor returns and the completion of the waterworks dam in 1873 lead to the end of mining in Karori. Parts of the area continued to be farmed up until 1906 when the remaining catchment was purchased for the water works.

The upper reservoir, retained by a concrete gravity arch dam, was completed in 1908. From this point, as the whole valley was a protected water catchment area for Wellington city, the slopes were re-vegetated with introduced trees and the native forest also began regenerating. The upper dam was decommissioned as a reservoir about 1991, the lower one in 1997.

Jim Lynch promoted the idea of a wildlife sanctuary in the early 1990s. The "Natural Wellington" project identified the reservoir catchment as having special significance because it is a large self-contained habitat suitable for a wide variety of native plants and animals. In 1993 a feasibility study was carried out by the Wellington regional and city councils and after public consultation in 1994, the idea of a sanctuary was given the go-ahead. The Karori Wildlife Sanctuary Trust was formed in mid-1995 to implement the proposed 'mainland island' wildlife sanctuary. The fence surrounding Zealandia was completed in 1999.

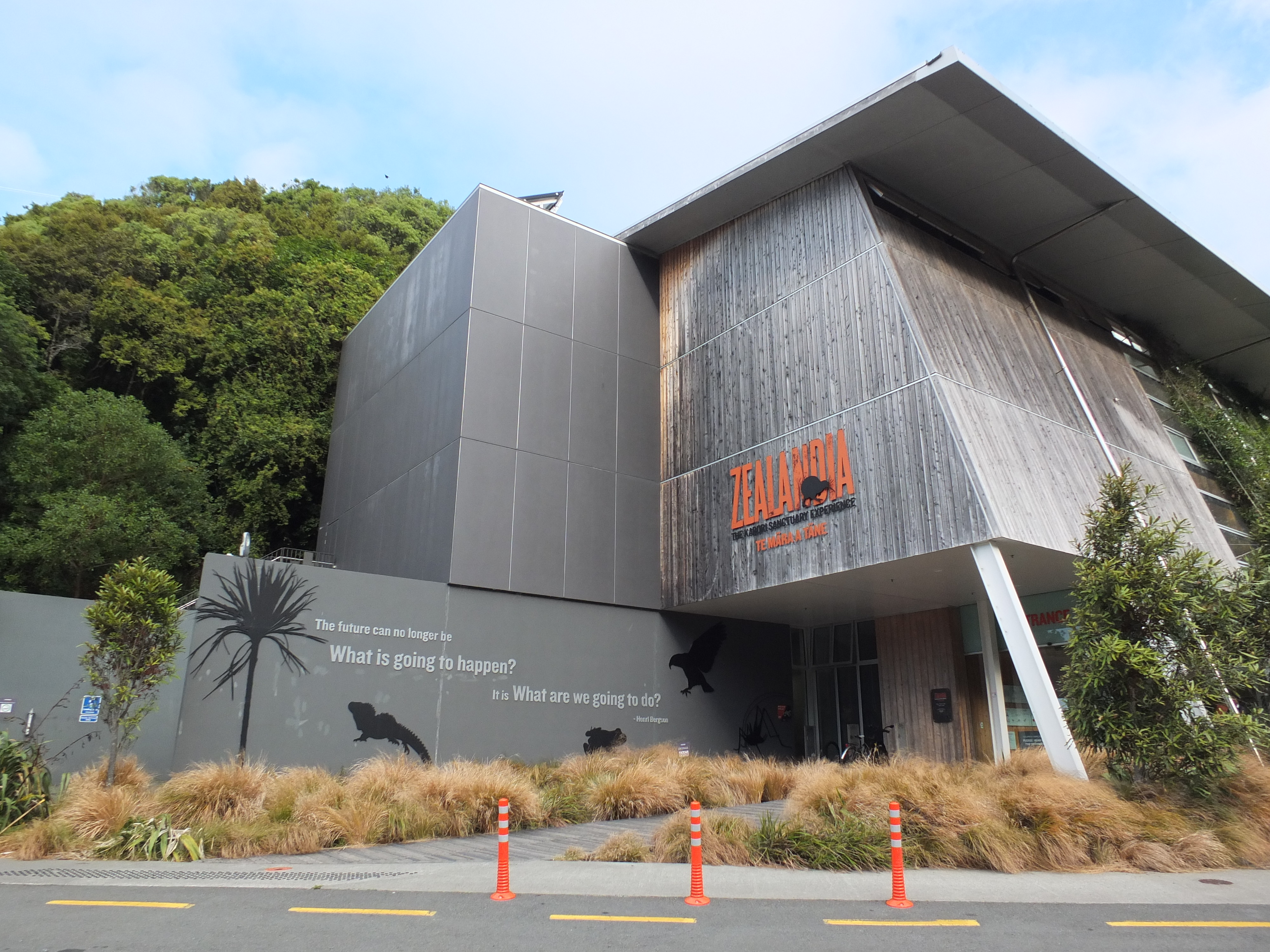
The Visitor Centre

The land was transferred from the Greater Wellington Regional Council to Wellington City Council in 2004.

Zealandia Visitor Centre was designed by architectural firm Jasmax, and opened in 2010 by the Prime Minister of the time John Key. It cost $17 million New Zealand dollars with varying opinions at the time if this should have been supported by the Wellington City Council or not. At the time John Key said, "the visitor centre is a world-class facility that will help Zealandia to rival Te Papa as a tourist attraction". The name was changed to Zealandia Te Māra a Tāne around this time.

The Karori Sanctuary Trust became a council-controlled organisation of Wellington City Council in October 2016, and is part-funded by the council.

In early August 2025, the Royal New Zealand Navy dispatched personnel to conduct a navigational survey of the Zealandia sanctuary's lake. The last survey had been done in 2018.

== Organisation structure ==
The management of Zealandia Te Māra a Tāne is by the Karori Sanctuary Trust. This is a community-led organisation and holds a non-profit status through registration with New Zealand Charities Services. Previous names of this trust are The Karori Reservoir Wildlife Sanctuary Trust and Karori Sanctuary Trust. In 2026 the trustees were Rebecca Matthews, Colin Rowsell, Martha Jeffries, Paul Atkins, Margaret Hyland, Elizabeth G Harrison and Russell Spratt (Board Chair). In addition Zealandia is a Council Controlled Organisation and it receives funds from the Wellington City Council through an annual operations grant.

Zealandia has a paid staff and in 2026 the strategic leadership team had four members, including Dr Danielle Shanahan as Chief Executive. The staff work with over 500 volunteers. Some volunteers are long serving with at least one more than 25 years. One of the income streams for Zealandia is memberships.

== Pest-exclusion fence ==
The most crucial aspect of the sanctuary is a pest-exclusion fence, designed to exclude 14 species of non-native land mammals ranging from deer to mice, which encircles the 8.6-kilometre (5.3 mi) perimeter of the sanctuary. Construction of the fence was completed in late 1999 and all mammalian pests within the perimeter were then eradicated over a nine-month period. This predator-proof fence is of great conservation significance, being a world first design to bar all terrestrial mammals from mouse size up.

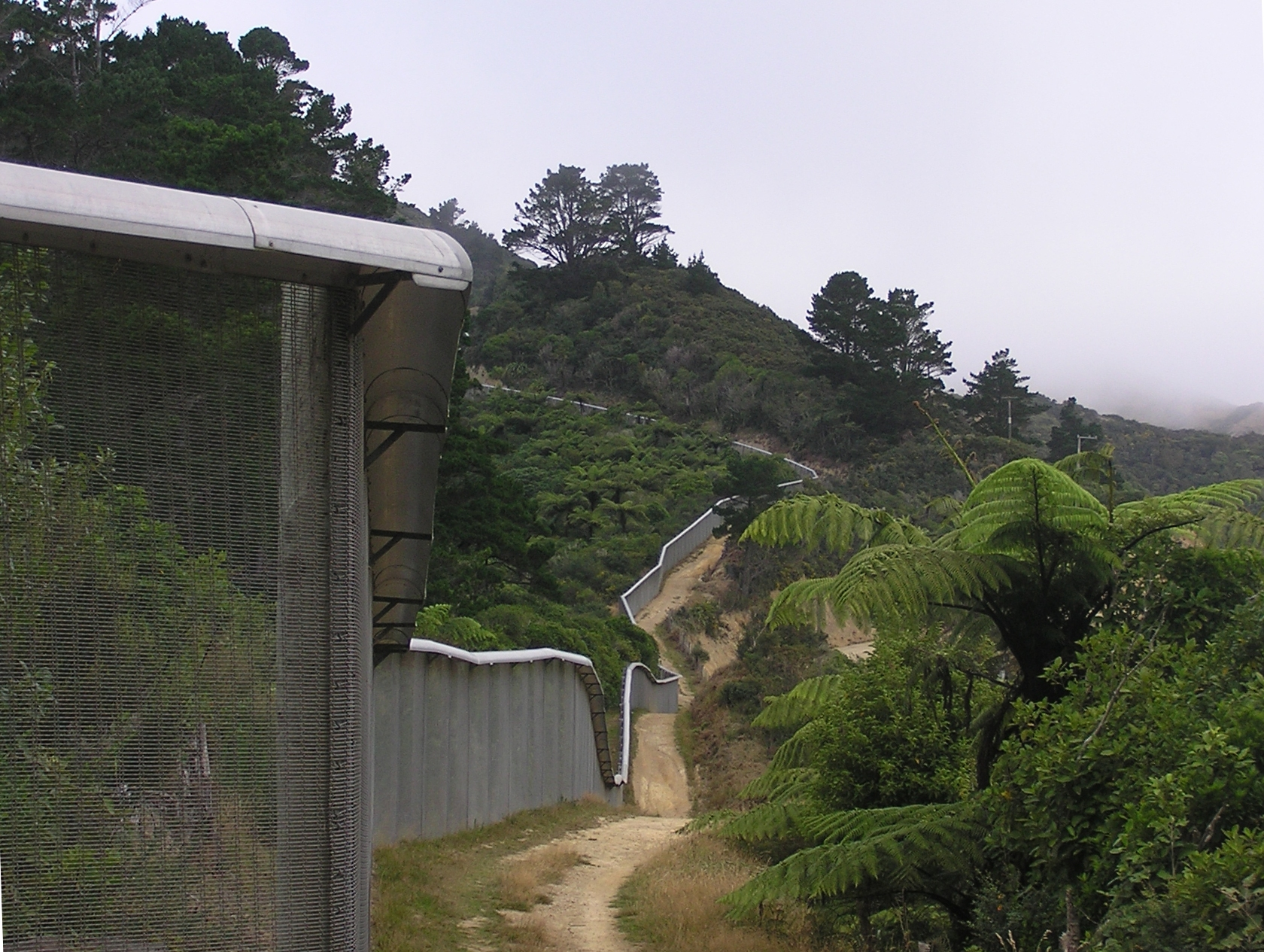
A stretch of the fence

=== Species to be excluded by the fence ===
- Black rat
- Cat
- Fallow deer
- Ferret
- Goat
- Hare
- Hedgehog
- Mouse
- Norway rat
- Pig
- Rabbit
- Possum
- Stoat
- Weasel

The fence design was arrived at after trials with the various species to be excluded. Its main features are a small mesh size (to exclude animals down to the size of a mouse), a curved top-cap (to prevent animals climbing over) and an underground foot (to prevent animals burrowing underneath).

Stoat running off after being unable to find a way through the fence

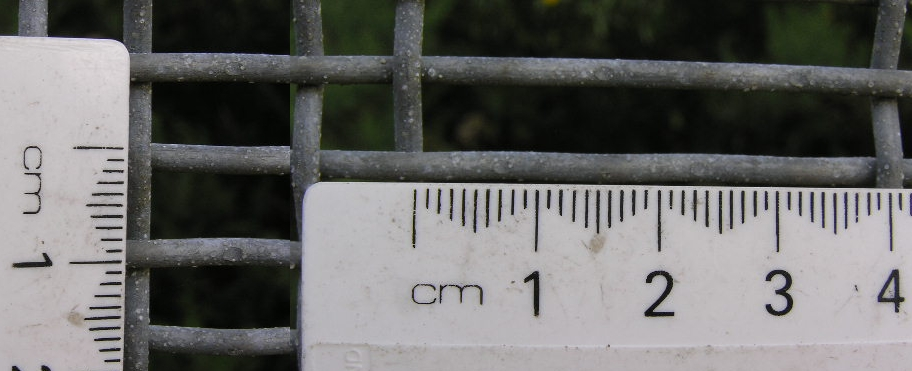
Mesh size

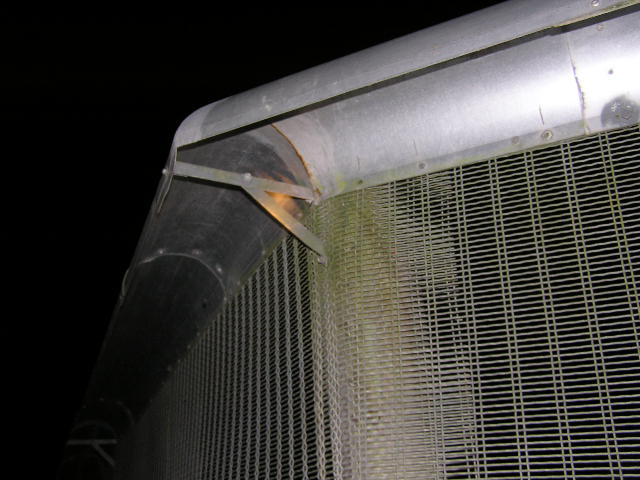
Top cap detail

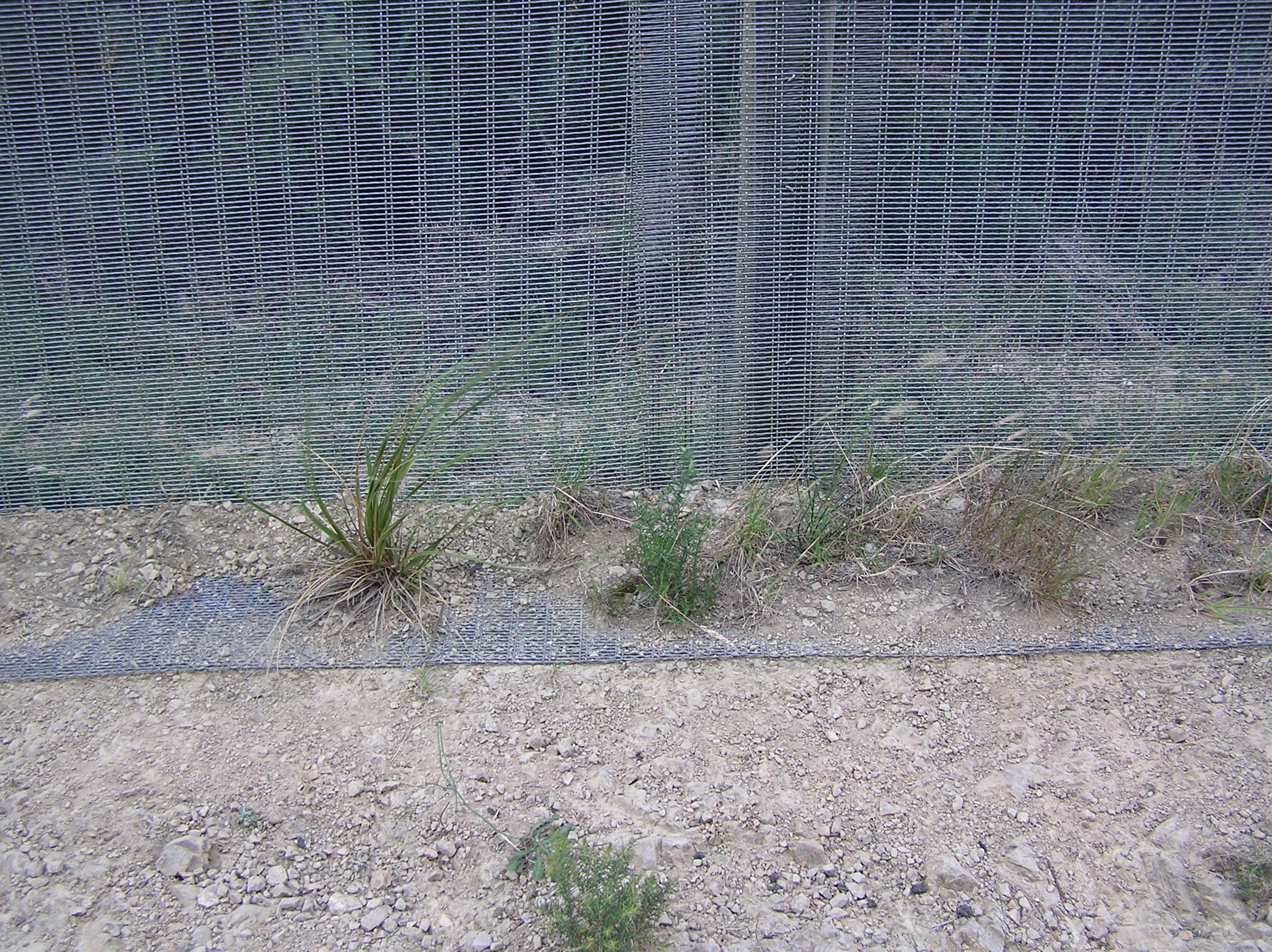
Footer

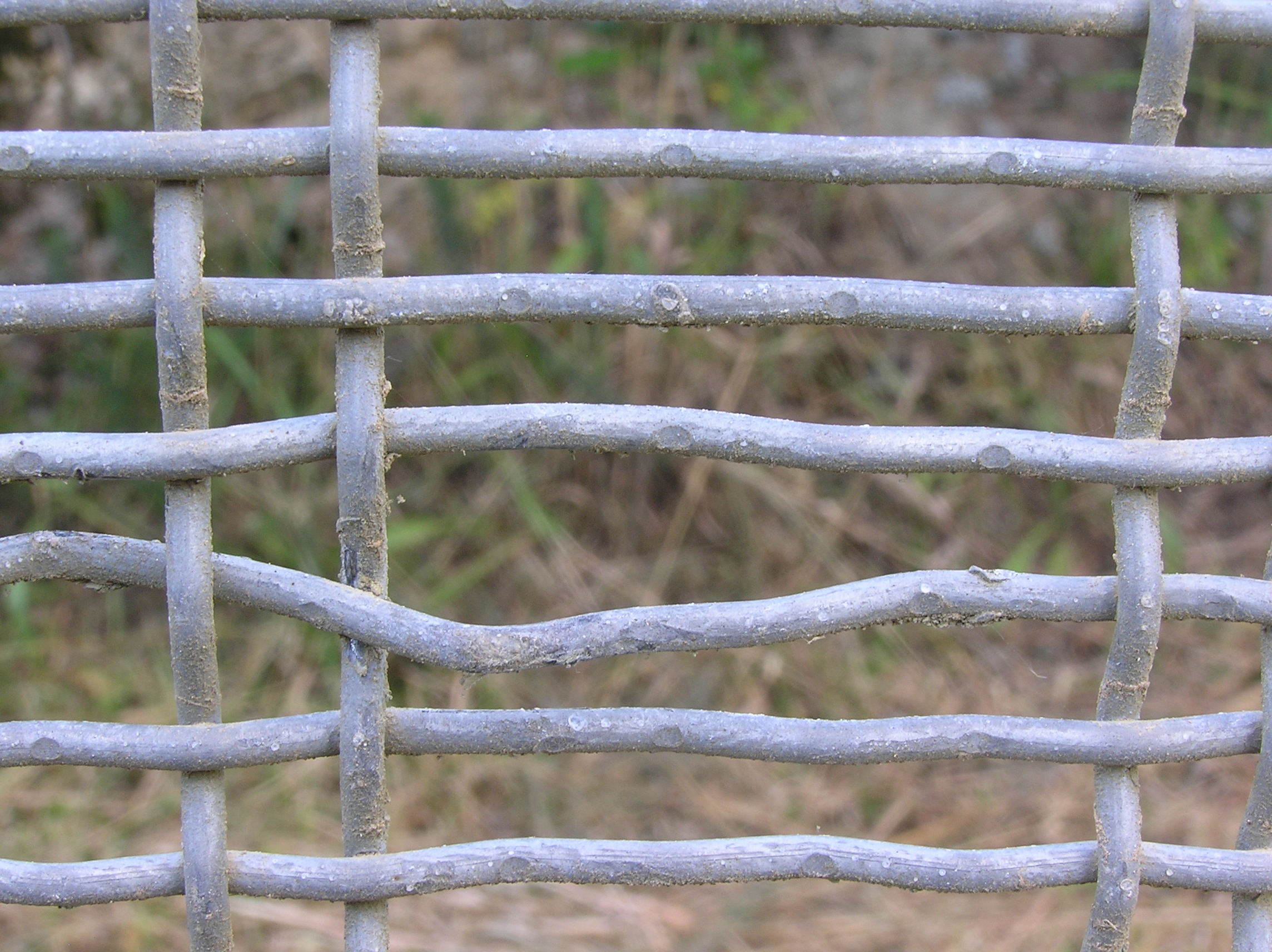
Example of a small defect in fence mesh

In terms of its meeting conservation goals, the sanctuary has met with considerable success due to the design of the perimeter fence. The fence and ongoing monitoring have successfully kept the sanctuary free of all but the smallest species – the house mouse. It is thought that small defects in the fence mesh (damaged during construction) allowed mice to re-enter the sanctuary. Modifications to the fence have been considered in an attempt to permanently exclude mice, but meanwhile, mouse numbers are monitored and controlled. There have been occasional breaches of the fence by weasels and rats, these occasional incursions are not unexpected (for example resulting from storm damage bringing trees down upon the fence), and are picked up by on-going monitoring with tracking tunnels.

== Restoration ==
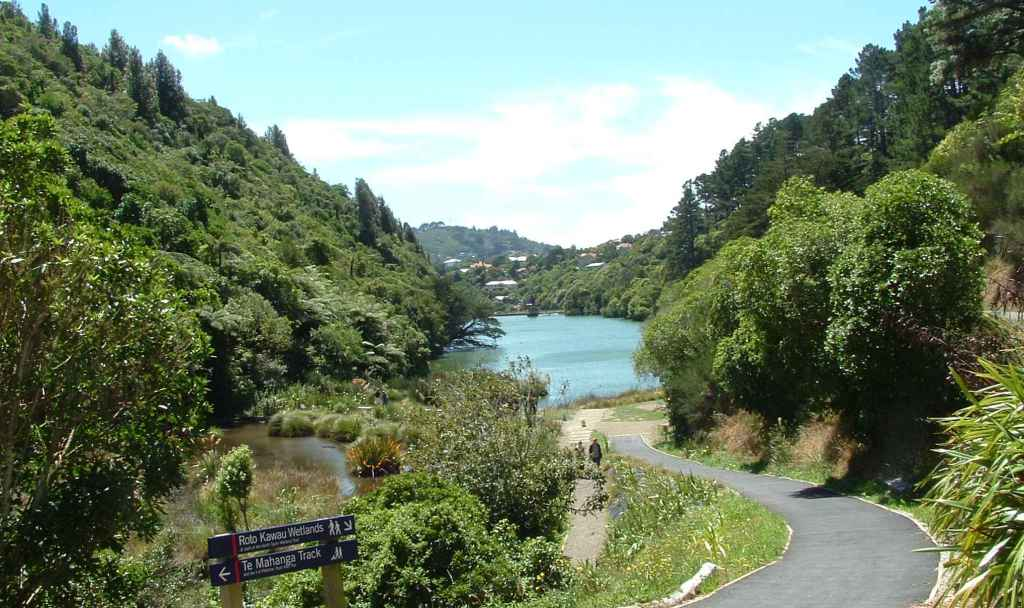
Lower Karori Reservoir looking north-east

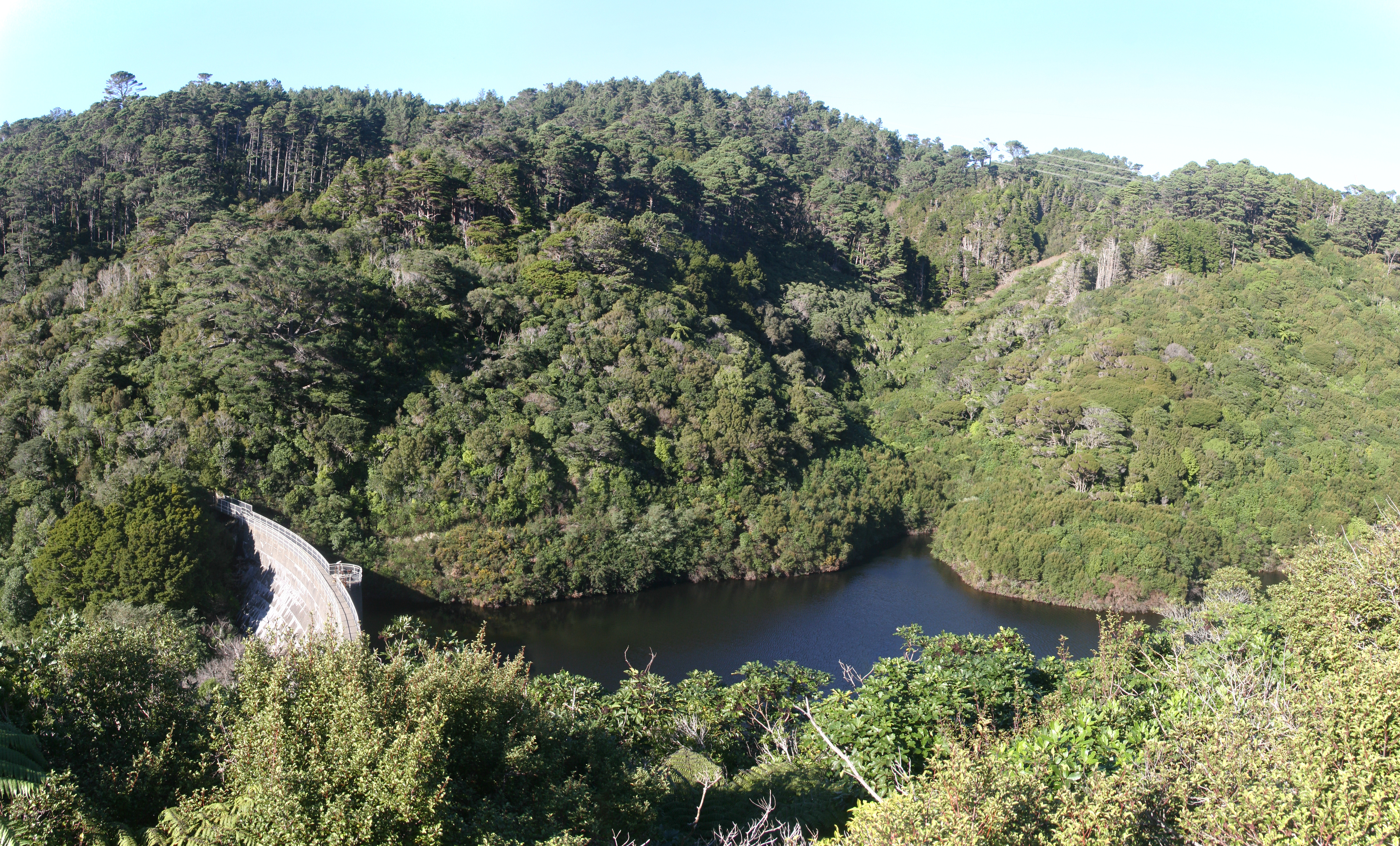
Upper Karori Reservoir

The flora and fauna in the sanctuary are recovering from its pre-managed degraded state. Although the original primary forest has been regenerating since 1906, it is still in the early stages of succession with small hardy trees such as mahoe dominating. Members of the original flora that are missing from the site, or rare, include large podocarp species such as rimu, matai, miro, kahikatea, and tōtara, are being re-established. Northern rātā has also virtually disappeared from the valley and a number of seedlings have been planted. A wide variety of native trees, of benefit to native fauna, is already present. This includes a mature colony of the New Zealand fuchsia (kōtukutuku) (Fuchsia excorticata).

Zealndia has an 'intergenerational view' for restoration where people are considered 'stewards' not owneer. Associate Professor Margaret Stanley (School of Biological Sciences at the University of Auckland, in 2021 says of Zealandia: " "It's a place where restoration techniques can be trialled, which is important for advancing conservation management outside of these areas".

== Species ==
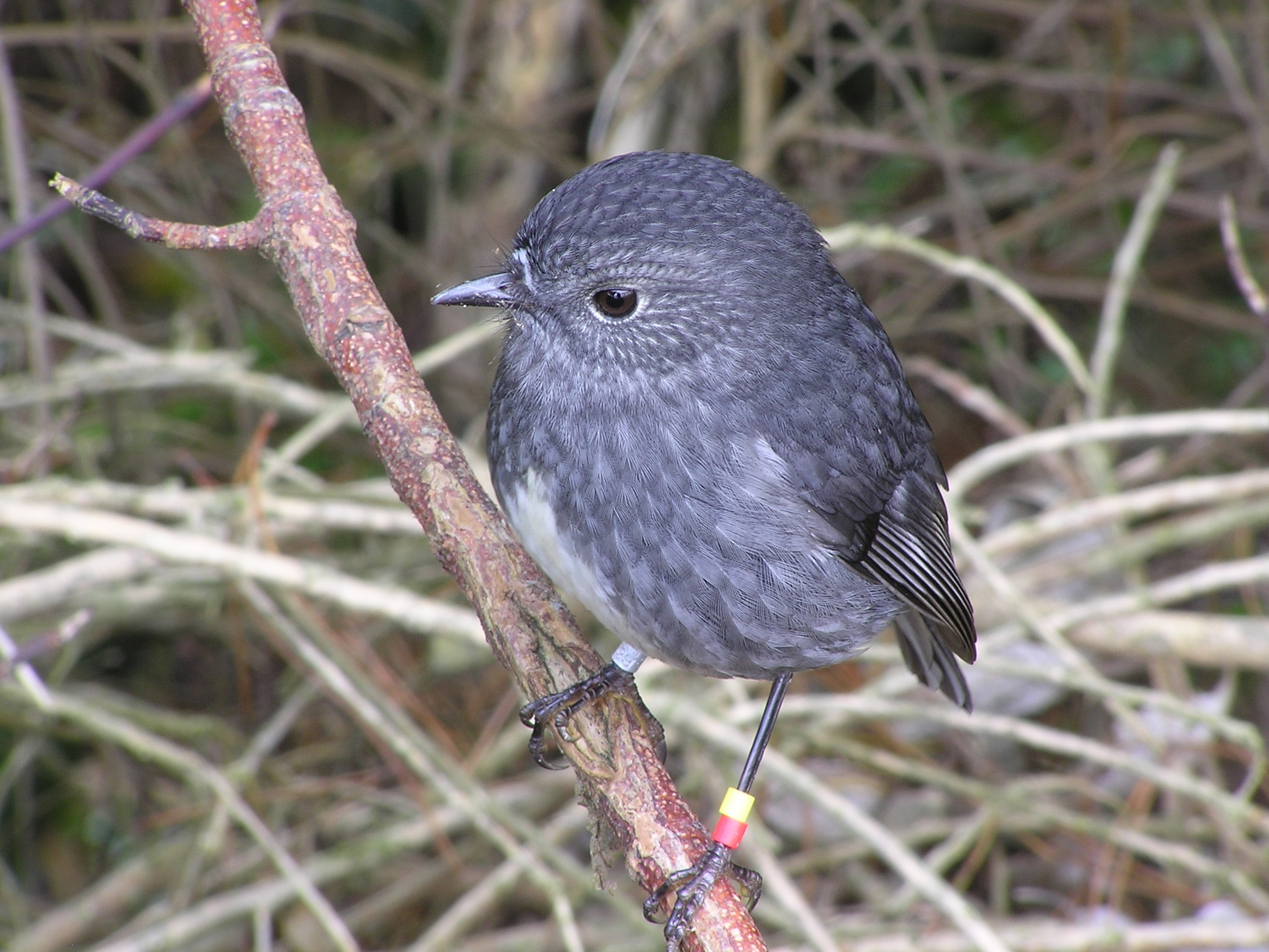
Toutouwai, one of the many birds free to breed in the sanctuary and re-populate the surrounding environment

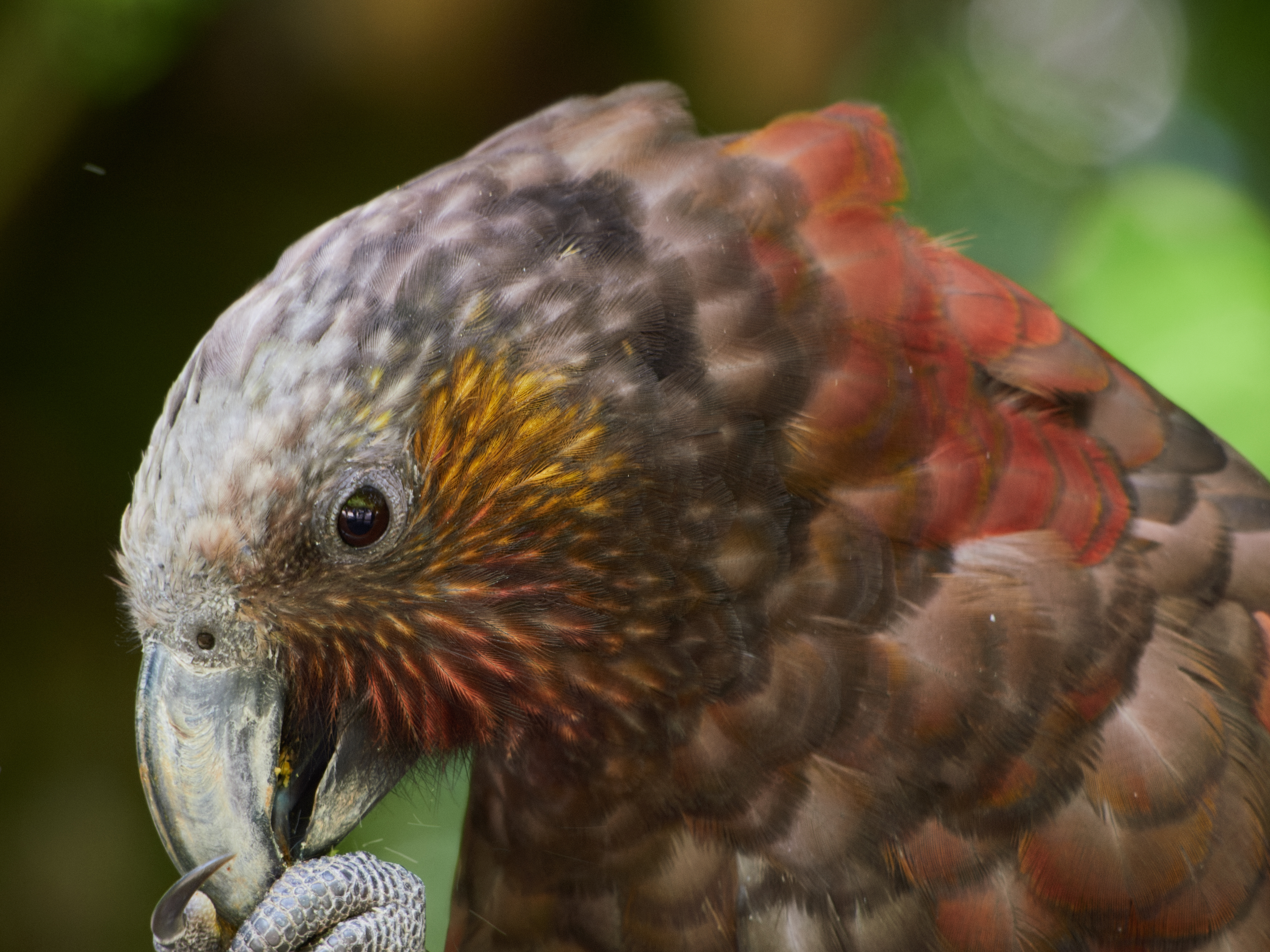
A Kākā feeding with its claws

- Native birds that have been released in the sanctuary and are still present include:
  - Bellbird, New Zealand (korimako) (Anthornis melanura)
  - Brown teal (pāteke) (Anas chlorotis) (four pairs released 2000-11-03)
  - Kākā, North Island (Nestor meridionalis) (three released 2002-08-24)
  - Kākāriki, red-fronted parakeet (Cyanoramphus novaezelandiae) (23 released 2010-July-02)
  - Little spotted kiwi (kiwi pukupuku) (Apteryx owenii) (20 released 2000-07-04)
  - Kererū, New Zealand pigeon (Hemiphaga novaeseelandiae) (10 released 2002 to 2005)
  - Robin, North Island (toutouwai) (Petroica longipes) (40 released 2001-05-11)
  - Saddleback, North Island (tīeke) (Philesturnus rufusater) (39 released 2002-06-16)
  - Scaup, New Zealand (papango) (Aythya novaeseelandiae) (one pair released 2002-05-03)
  - Stitchbird (hihi) (Notiomystis cincta) (30 released 2005-02-17)
  - Takahē, South Island (Porphyrio hochstetteri) (pairs released in 2011, 2023)
  - Whitehead (pōpokatea) (Mohoua ochrocephala) (released 2001, 2002)
  - Rifleman (tītipounamu) (Acanthisitta chloris) (60 birds released 2019)
- Other native animals that have been released since 2000 include:
  - 70 tuatara, (Sphenodon punctatus), from Stephens Island (released December 2005).
  - New Zealand long-fin eel (tuna) (Anguilla dieffenbachii). The long-fin eel, alongside the short-finned eel (Anguilla australis), were also likely present before the fence was erected.
  - 100 giant wētā (wētāpunga) (Deinacrida rugosa) (2007)
  - 21 Hamilton's frog (previously Maud Island frog) (pepeketua) (Leiopelma hamiltoni) (2006)
  - ~100 spotted skink (Oligosoma kokowai) (2016)
  - 200 New Zealand freshwater mussel (kākahi) (Echyridella menziesii) (2018)
- Other native species that are naturalised without needing transfers from outside the area include:
  - Birds
    - Black shag (kawau pū) (Phalacrocorax carbo novaehollandiae)
    - Fantail, North Island (pīwakawaka) (Rhipidura fulginosa placabilis)
    - Falcon, New Zealand (kārearea) (Falco novaeseelandiae)
    - Grey warbler, New Zealand (riroriro) (Gerygone igata)
    - Little black shag (kawau tūī) (Phalacrocorax sulcirostris)
    - Little shag (kawau paka) (Phalacrocorax melanoleucos brevirostris)
    - Pied shag, New Zealand (kāruhiruhi) (Phalacrocorax varius varius)
    - Morepork (ruru) (Ninox novaeseelandiae)
    - Silvereye (tauhou) (Zosterops lateralis)
    - Shining cuckoo (pipiwharauroa) (Chrysococcyx lucidus lucidus)
    - Southern Black-backed gull (karoro) (Larus dominicanus)
    - Tūī (Prosthemadera novaeseelandiae)
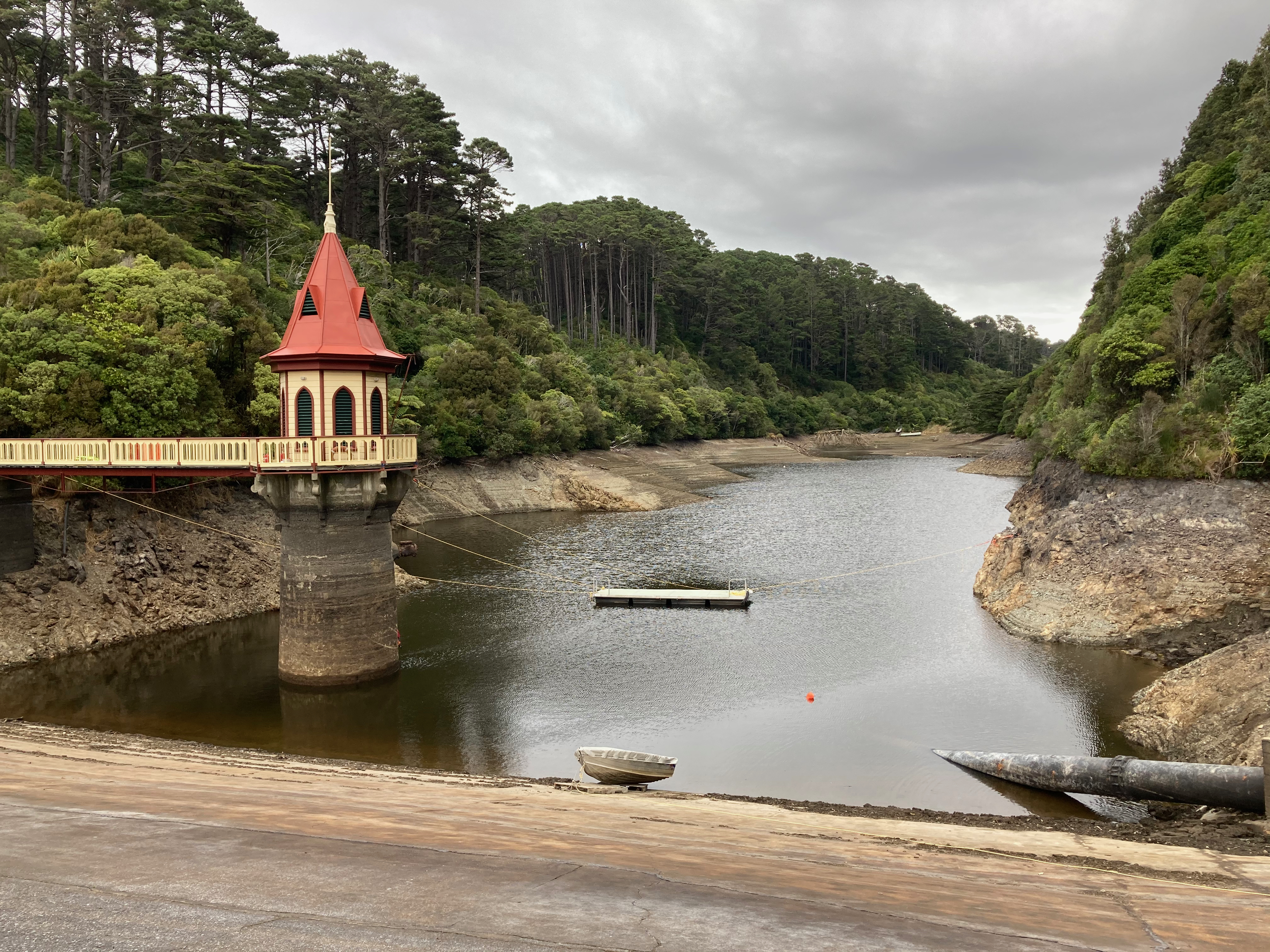
      Lower dam with valve tower during lowering of the reservoir level to enable removal of perch, May 2021
  - Reptiles
    - Raukawa gecko (Woodworthia maculata)
    - Ngāhere gecko (Mokopirirakau aff. granulatus 'Southern North Island')
    - Brown skink (Oligosoma zelandicum)
    - Northern grass skink (Oligosoma polychroma)
    - Copper skink (Oligosoma aeneum)
    - Ornate skink (Oligosoma ornatum)
- Rare / no longer present species
  - New Zealand pipit (pīhoihoi) ((Anthus novaeseelandiae)
  - Pūkeko (Porphyrio melanotus)
  - Tomtit, North Island (miromiro) (Petroica macrocephala toitoi)
  - Weka, North Island (Gallirallus australis). Four pairs of weka were released in June, 2000 (no longer present).
  - New Zealand long-tailed bat (Pekapeka) (Chalinolobus tuberculatus). Last spotted in 2004.
- Non-native species
  - Perch. In 2021 the water level in the lower reservoir was reduced by 6 metres (20 ft) to enable eradication of the introduced European perch which were eating native fish species and polluting the water with algal bloom.

== Visitor experiences and services ==
Zealandia offer guided tours. These are often carried out by volunteers. There are night-time tours and people often see kiwi. There are dawn tours that focus on listening to the dawn chorus. Zealandia has an interpretative research centre and Zealandia is a place where scientists carry out research for example beetle community analysis and hihi/stitchbird nestlings. Another study occurred from 2019 to 2022 and involved many volunteer citizen scientists and the national museum Te Papa with photographs uploaded to iNaturalist for a study on moths.

== Awards ==
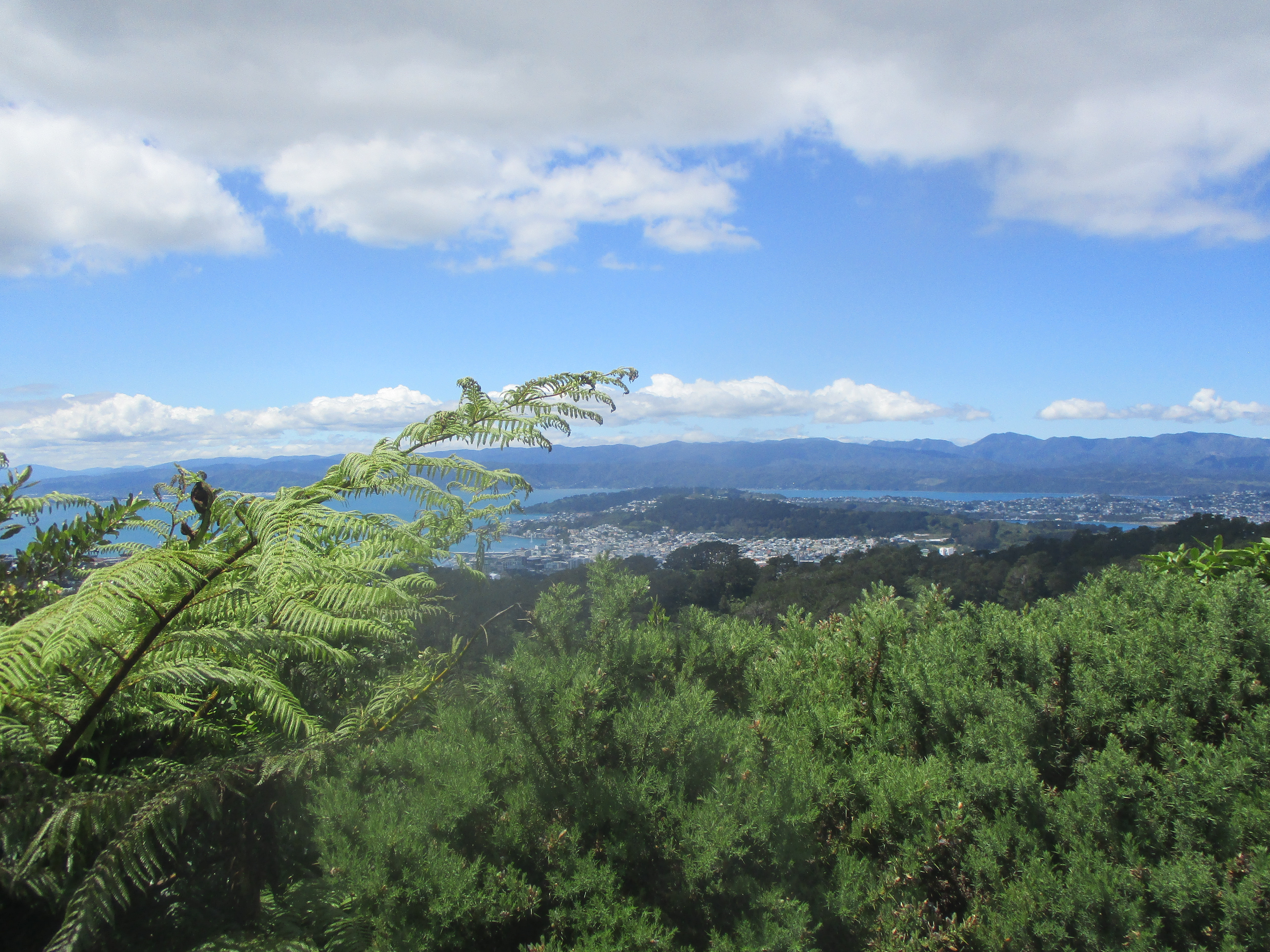
View of Wellington from Zealandia

In 2023, Zealandia won the Supreme Tourism Award at the New Zealand Tourism Awards. It also won the Airbnb Tourism Excellence Award for Small to Medium businesses. The chief executive of Tourism Industry Aotearoa, Rebecca Ingram, said about the award: "Zealandia is everything we love about tourism: protecting our wildlife, telling our unique story, thrilling visitors and beloved by its community."

The Zealandia Visitor Centre won an award in the 2010 Wellington Architecture Awards, it won in the Commercial Architecture category with comments saying, “a powerful and dramatic entry space”. The architects were Jasmax.
