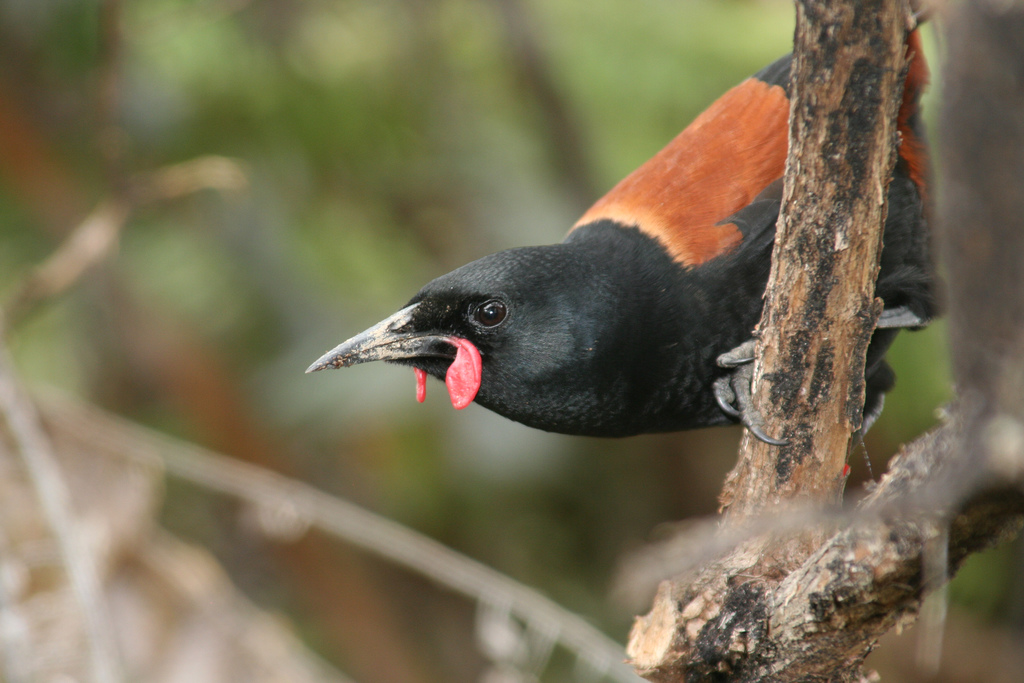
- North Island saddleback (Philesturnus rufusater)

Scientific classification
- Kingdom: Animalia
- Phylum: Chordata
- Class: Aves
- Order: Passeriformes
- Family: Callaeidae
- Genus: Philesturnus; I. Geoffroy Saint-Hilaire, 1832

Type species
- Sturnus carunculatus Gmelin, 1789

Species
- P. rufusater P. carunculatus

= Saddleback (bird) =

Genus of birds

The saddlebacks or tīeke (Māori) are two species of New Zealand birds of the family Callaeidae. Both are glossy black with a chestnut saddle. Their taxonomic family is also known as that of the (New Zealand) "wattlebirds" and includes the two species of kōkako, and the extinct huia. All members of the family Callaeidae have coloured fleshy wattles on either side of the beak; the saddlebacks' are a vivid red.

== Taxonomy ==
North Island saddleback side view showing the distinct saddle

South Island saddleback adult and juvenile

The genus Philesturnus was introduced in 1832 by the French zoologist Isidore Geoffroy Saint-Hilaire to accommodate a single species, the South Island saddleback, which is therefore the type species of the genus. The name combines the honeyeater genus Philedon and the starling genus Sturnus.

The saddleback's common name derives from the demarcated brown plumage on its back, which resembles a saddle. The Māori name, tīeke, is onomatopoeic and comes from one of the species' calls: "ti-e-ke-ke-ke-ke".

There are two species:

- North Island saddleback – Philesturnus rufusater
- South Island saddleback – Philesturnus carunculatus

The saddlebacks appear to be a remnant of an early expansion of passerines in New Zealand, and are two of five New Zealand wattlebirds of the family Callaeidae, the others being the extinct huia, the endangered North Island kōkako, and the possibly extinct South Island kōkako. New Zealand wattlebirds have only one close relative: the stitchbird.

== Behaviour ==
Juvenile saddleback looking for insects

Saddlebacks are larger than other arboreal insectivorous birds in New Zealand forests. They measure as much as 25 cm (10 in) in length and can weigh up to 75 grams (somewhat larger than a common blackbird). They will tear pieces of bark from tree trunks to find insects beneath, which are then dispatched and consumed with their short, robust, and unusually strong beaks. They will also feed on the ground in leaf litter. However, their diet is not strictly insectivorous: they have been observed eating fruit and drinking nectar. Like their close relative the kōkako, saddlebacks are poor fliers and mostly bound from branch to branch, but can fly short distances.

Territorial birds, the saddlebacks display antagonistic behaviour in this regard on three levels of intensity, singing out at dawn to mark their territory, making threat displays, which can include head bobbing, tail fanning, and warbling (during which the wattles dilate). When a direct challenge is made to a bird's territory, fights can occur in which combatants attempt to grapple with the wattles of their foe. Saddlebacks are notoriously fearless and noisy, and frequently enchanted 19th-century European naturalists with their behaviour.

Saddlebacks nest in epiphytes, in tree-fern crowns, and in holes in tree trunks. They have a tendency to nest near the ground, and their fledglings will leave the nest to hop around in a typically noisy fashion while they build wing strength.

== Saddlebacks and people ==
=== Place in Māori culture ===
Saddlebacks traditionally held a strong place in Māori belief systems: their cries were viewed as good omens when they came from the right, and bad omens if from the left. Their cheeky nature is reflected in the Māori legend that tells of how the birds acquired its distinctive chestnut coloured saddle. Fresh from his battle to ensnare the sun, a thirsty Māui (a virtual demi-god in Māori folklore) asked the tīeke to bring him some water. The bird rudely pretended not to hear his request, at which Māui, becoming angry, seized it with his still fiery hand, leaving a brown scorch mark across its back.

=== Decline, present day conservation and recovery ===
Their breeding behaviour (nesting near the ground and fledglings hopping noisily around on the ground) make them especially vulnerable to predation from introduced mammals, including mustelids, brown rats and ship rats. This resulted in both species swiftly disappearing from the New Zealand mainland. By the beginning of the 20th century, both species were confined to a respective island; in the far north, Hen Island off Northland, and in the far south, Taukihepa / Big South Cape Island off Stewart Island / Rakiura.

Rats arrived on Big South Cape Island in 1963, accidentally introduced as they escaped from the boats of visiting muttonbirders. A swift rescue operation by the New Zealand Wildlife Service (now the Department of Conservation) barely saved the species from extinction, while the rats' predation soon condemned to extinction the local populations of the South Island snipe, bush wren and greater short-tailed bat.

Saddleback have since been relocated to island nature reserves around New Zealand, and also to mainland fenced sanctuaries. Since roughly 2015, sporadic sightings and evidence of breeding has been confirmed in Polhill Reserve, which neighbours the fenced Zealandia wildlife sanctuary. These have been the first sightings on New Zealand's un-fenced mainland since the bird was declared extinct on the mainland in 1910.

The recovery of the saddleback is considered by many to be one of New Zealand's greatest conservation success stories.

== Gallery ==
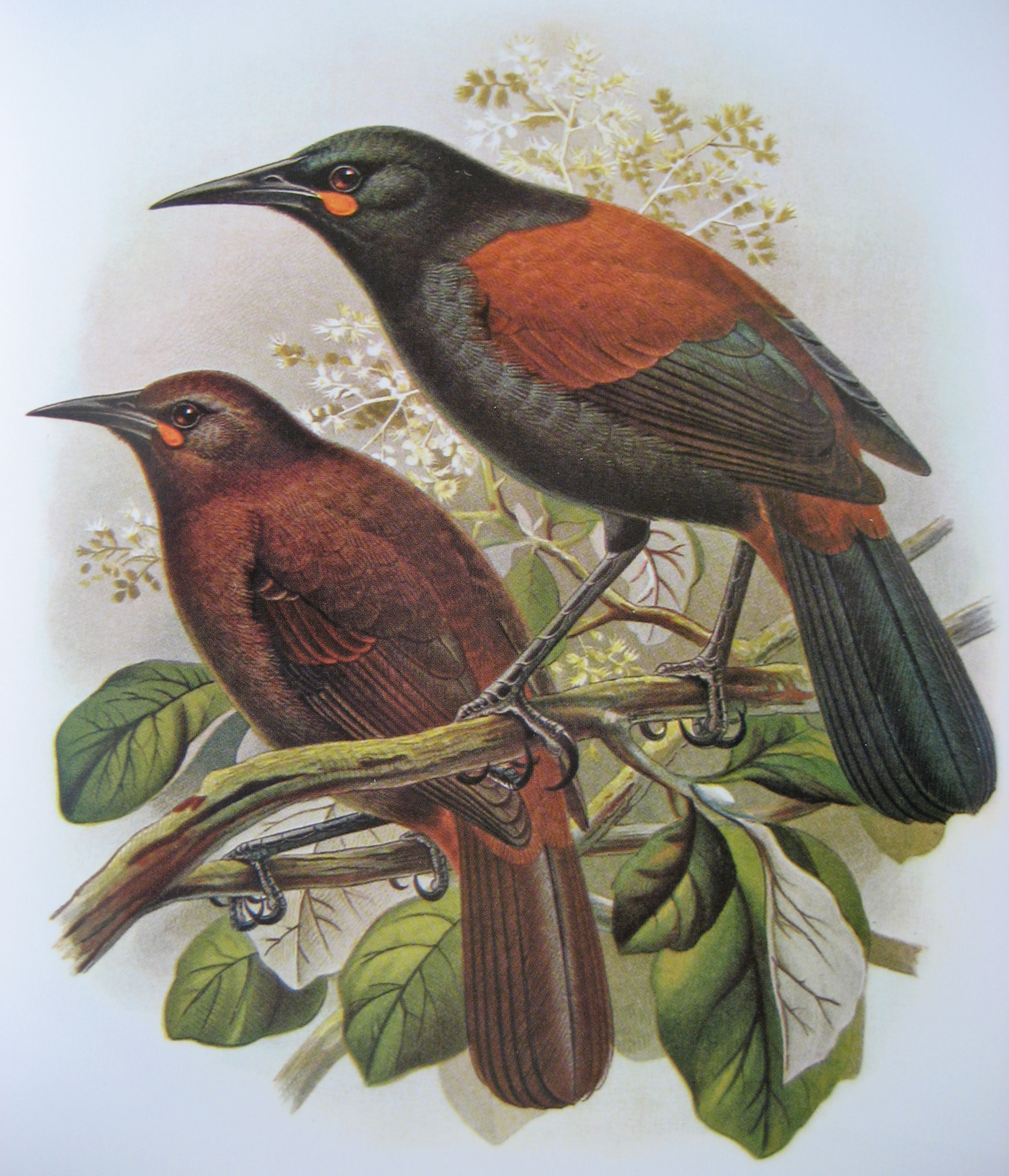
Adult in front, young of South Island species at rear (from Walter Buller's Birds of New Zealand)

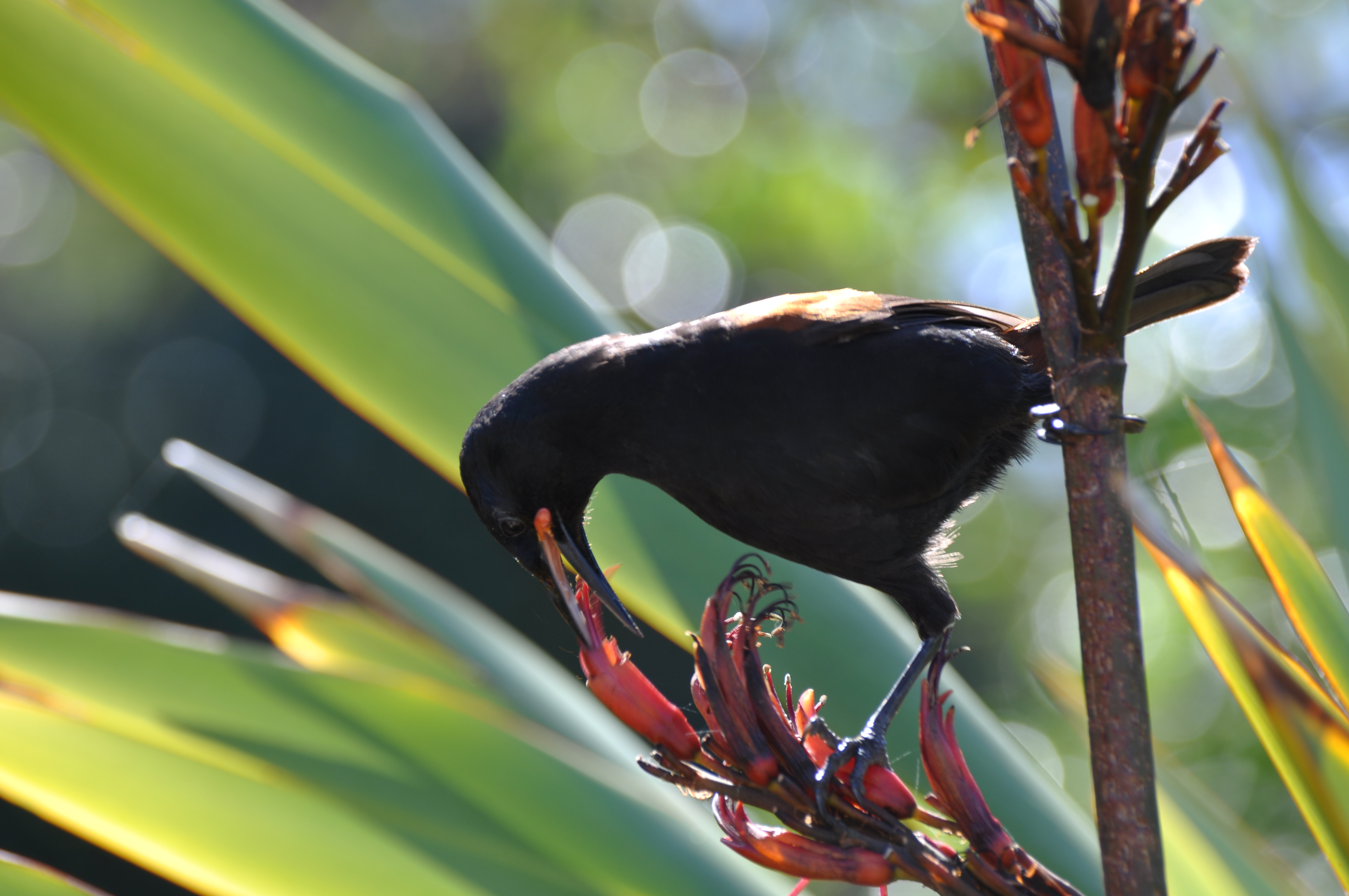
Feeding from a flax flower

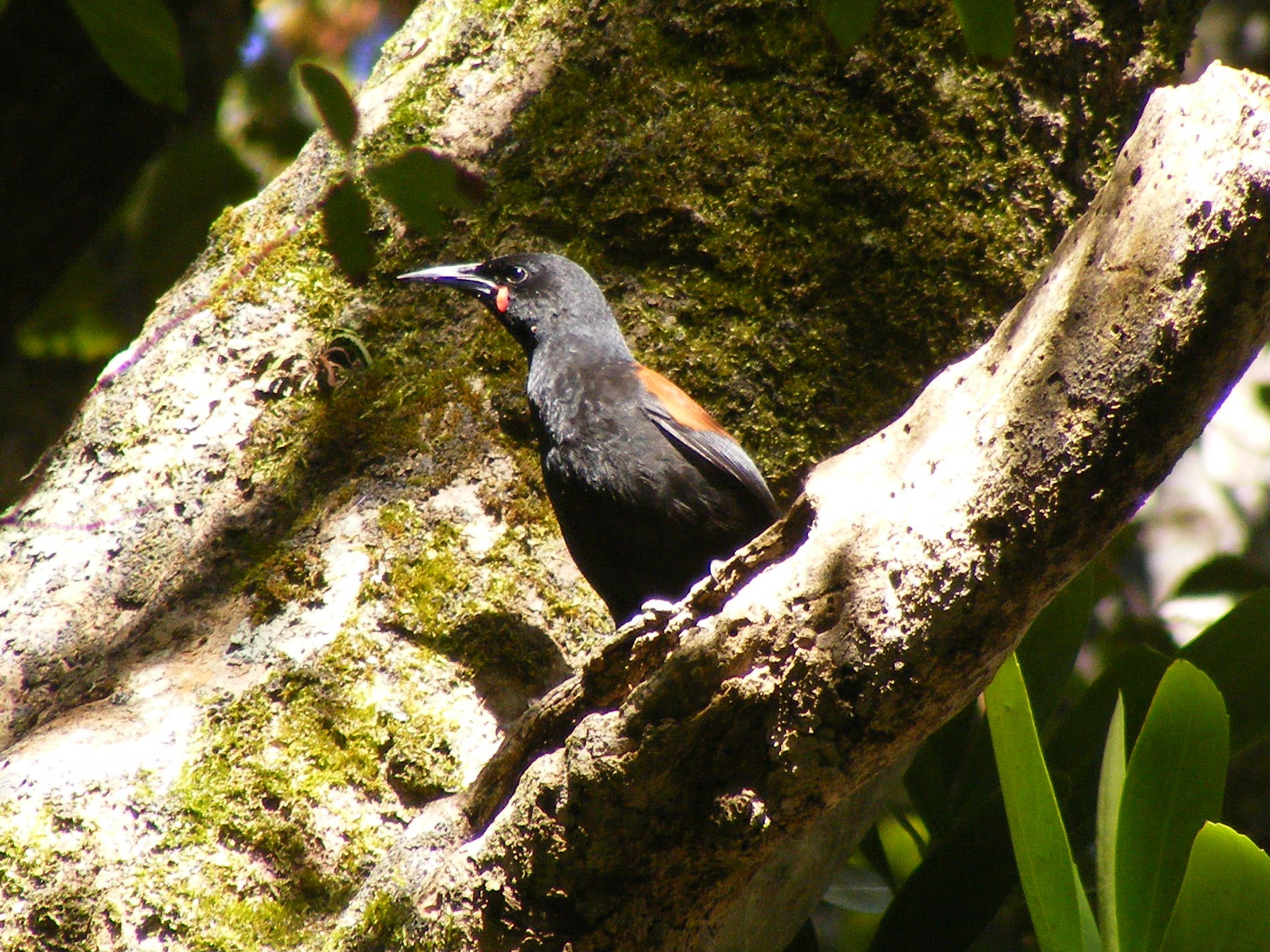
A South Island saddleback on Ulva Island (a sanctuary off Stewart Island), where a sizable population is maintained

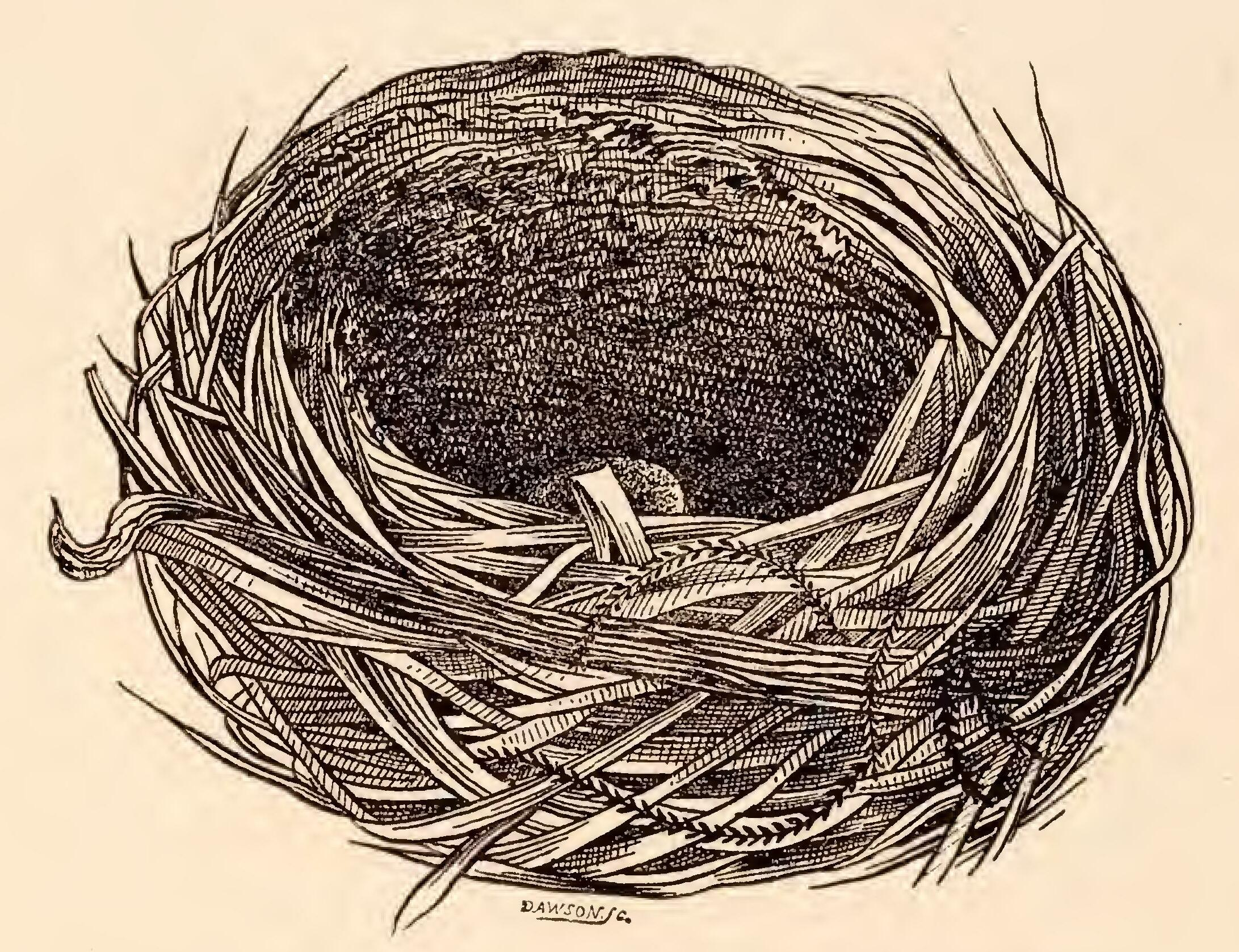
Illustration of a saddleback nest
