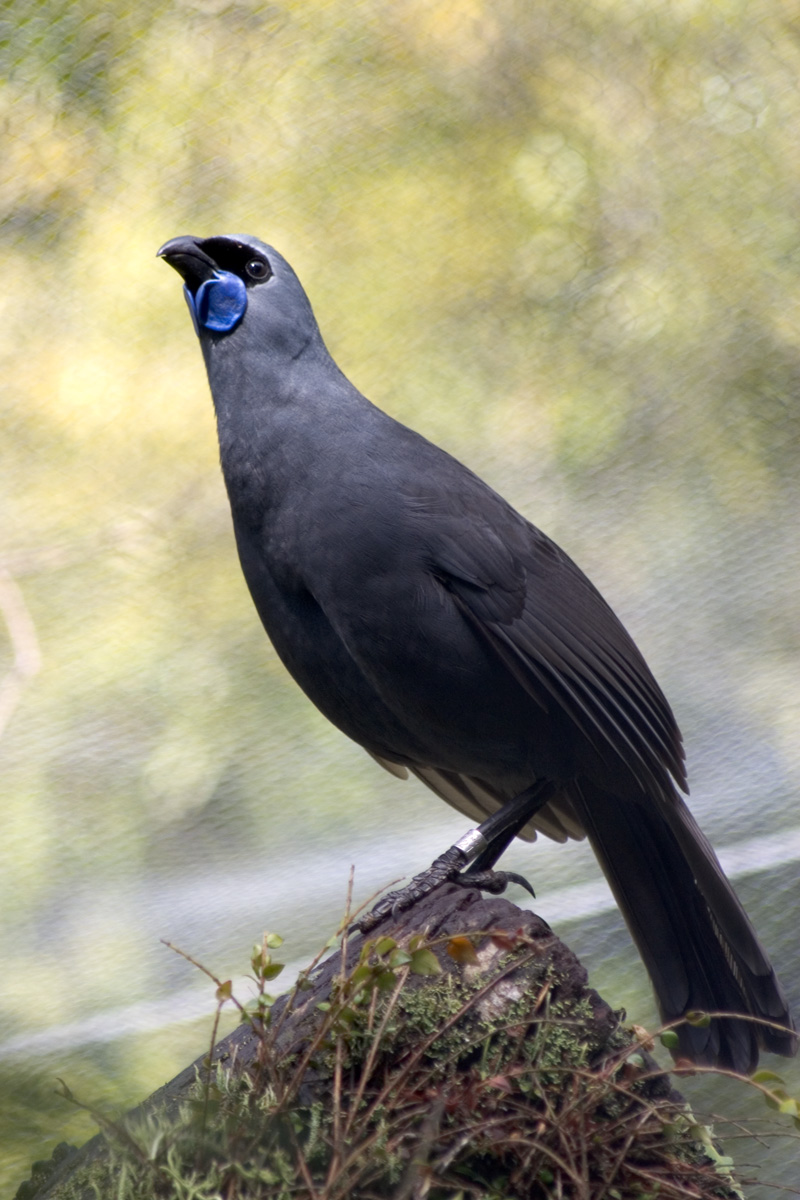

Scientific classification
- Kingdom: Animalia
- Phylum: Chordata
- Class: Aves
- Order: Passeriformes
- Family: Callaeidae
- Genus: Callaeas; Forster, JR, 1788

Type species
- Glaucopis cinerea Gmelin, JF, 1788

Species
- Callaeas cinereus; Callaeas wilsoni

= Kōkako =

Genus of birds

Kōkako (Note: The spelling kokako (without a macron) is common in New Zealand English.) /ˈkɔːkəkoʊ/ are two species of forest bird in the genus Callaeas which are endemic to New Zealand, the endangered North Island kōkako (Callaeas wilsoni) and the presumed extinct South Island kōkako (Callaeas cinereus). They are both slate-grey with wattles and have black masks. They belong to a family containing five species of New Zealand wattlebirds, the other three being two species of tīeke (saddleback) and the extinct huia. Previously widespread, kōkako populations throughout New Zealand have been decimated by the predations of mammalian invasive species such as possums, stoats, cats and rats, and their range has contracted significantly. In the past, this bird was called the New Zealand crow. It is not closely related to the crow, but looks like one from a distance.

== Taxonomy ==
The genus Callaeas was introduced in 1788 by the German naturalist Johann Reinhold Forster to accommodate a single species, the South Island kōkako, which is therefore the type species. The genus name is derived from the Ancient Greek word kallaia for a cock's wattles.

The kōkako appears to be a remnant of an early expansion of passerines in New Zealand and is one of five species of New Zealand wattlebirds of the family Callaeidae, the others being two species of endangered tieke, or saddleback, and the extinct huia. New Zealand wattlebirds have no close relatives apart from the stitchbird, and their taxonomic relationships to other birds remain to be determined.

== Description ==
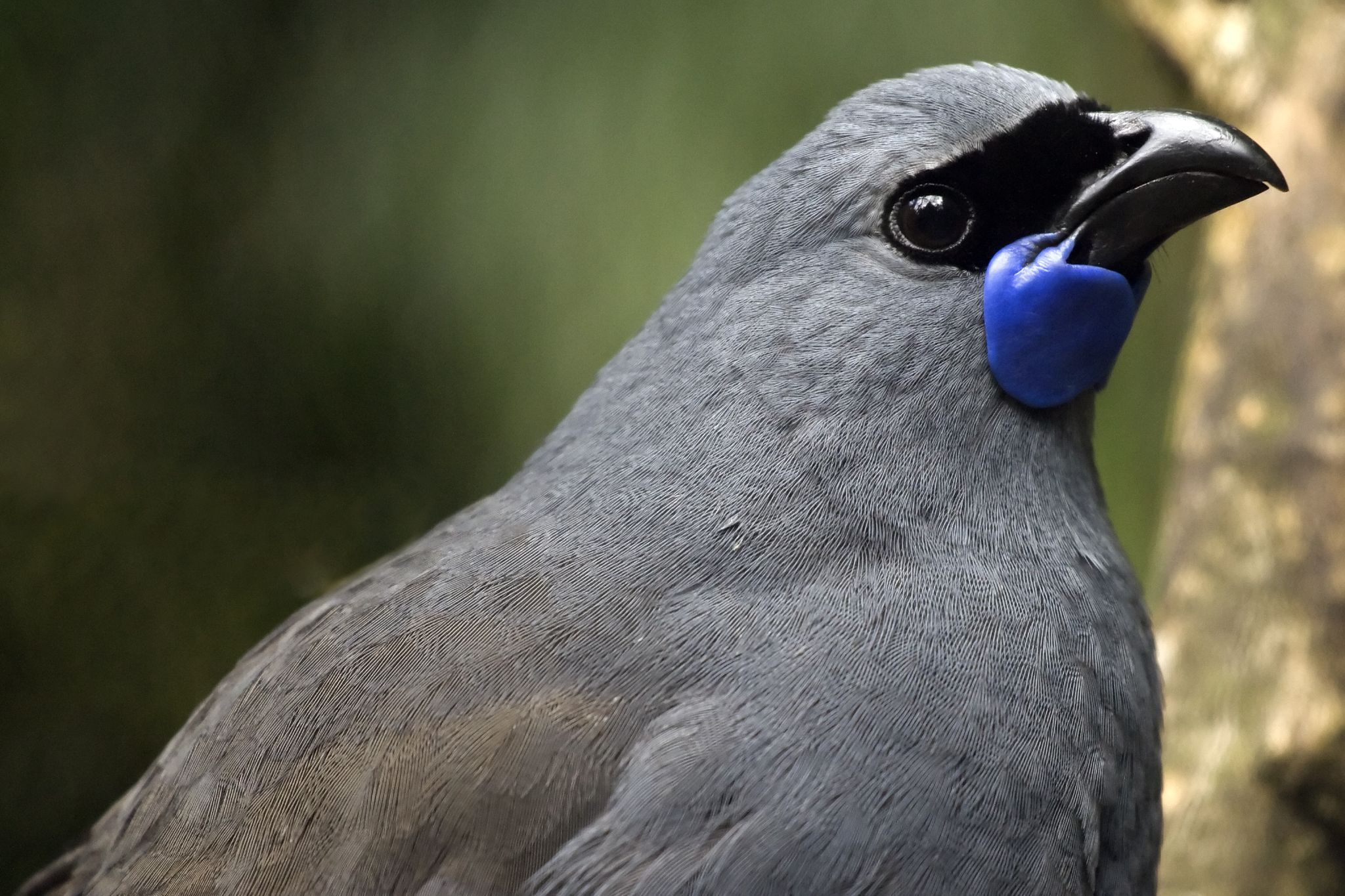
North Island kōkako, closeup of head showing blue wattles

The North Island kōkako, Callaeas wilsoni has blue wattles (although this colour develops with age: in the young of this bird they are actually coloured a light pink). The South Island kōkako, Callaeas cinereus, by contrast has largely orange wattles, with only a small patch of blue at the base.

== Behaviour ==
The kōkako has a beautiful, clear, organ-like song. Its call can carry for kilometres. Breeding pairs sing together in a bell-like duet for up to an hour in the early morning. Different populations in different parts of the North Island (if any populations of the South Island kōkako remain they are at present unknown) have distinctly different songs.

The kōkako is a poor flier and seldom flies more than 100 metres. The wings of this species are relatively short and rounded. It prefers to hop and leap from branch to branch on its powerful grey legs. It does not fly so much as glide and when seen exhibiting this behaviour they will generally scramble up tall trees (frequently New Zealand podocarps such as rimu and mataī) before gliding to others nearby. Its ecological niche has been compared to that of a flying squirrel. Its diet consists of leaves, fern fronds, flowers, fruit and invertebrates.

== Relationship with humans ==
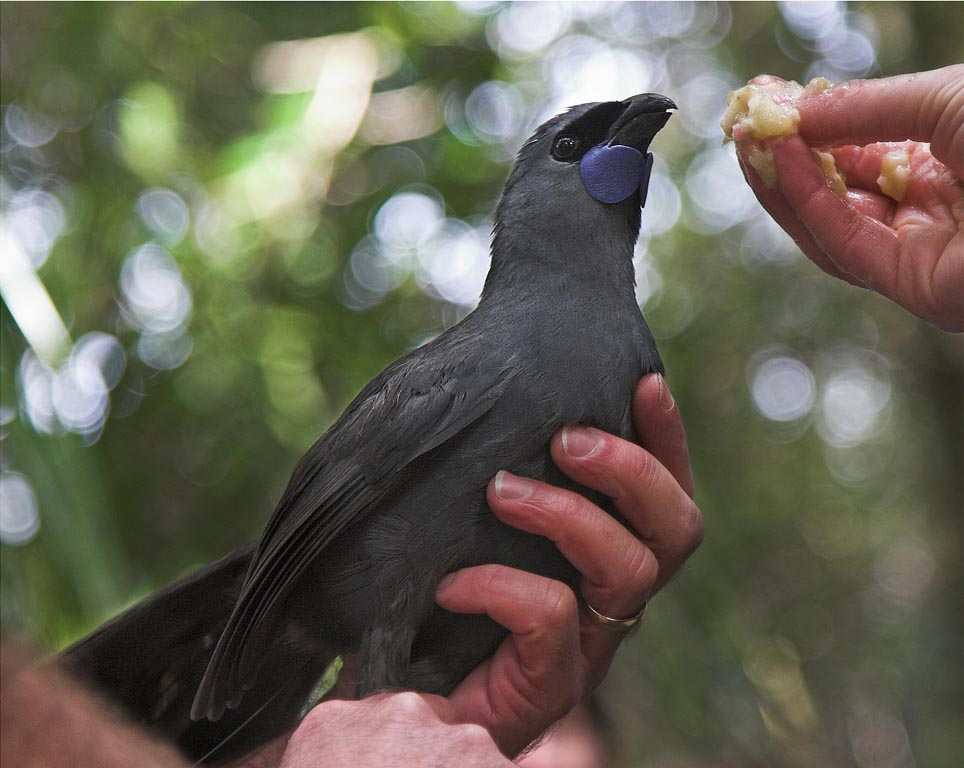
A kōkako about to be released in the Hunua Ranges near Auckland

Māori myth refers to the kōkako in several stories. In one notable story, a kōkako gave Māui water as he fought the sun by filling its plump wattles with water and offering it to Māui to quench his thirst. Māui rewarded kōkako for its kindness by stretching its legs until they were lean, long and strong, so that kōkako could easily leap through the forest to find food.

The kōkako appears on the reverse side of the New Zealand $50 note.

== See also ==
- Birds of New Zealand
- Wattle
