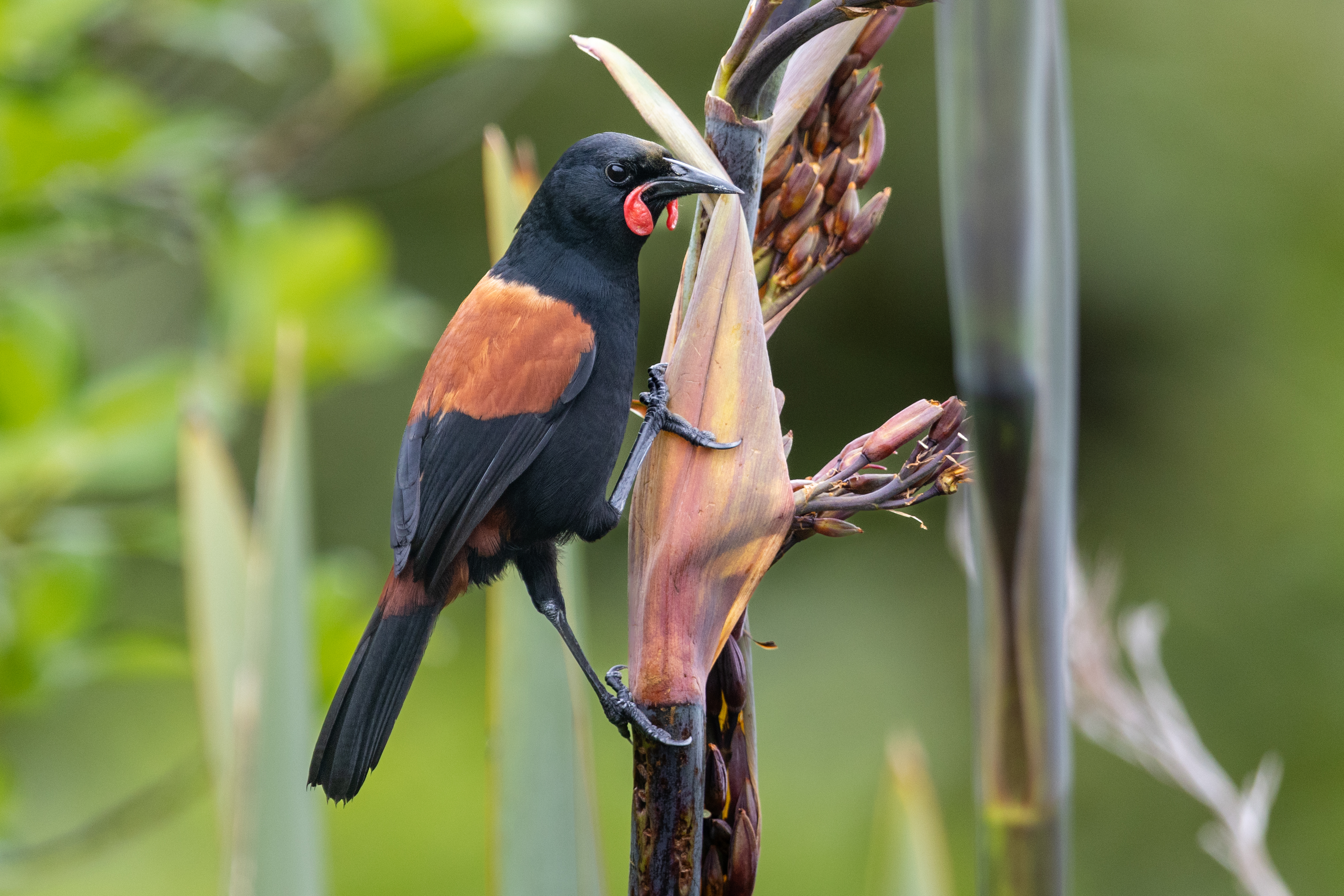
- North Island saddleback on Tiritiri Matangi Island

Conservation status
- Near Threatened (IUCN 3.1)

- Relict (NZ TCS)

Scientific classification
- Kingdom: Animalia
- Phylum: Chordata
- Class: Aves
- Order: Passeriformes
- Family: Callaeidae
- Genus: Philesturnus
- Species: P. rufusater

Binomial name
- Philesturnus rufusater (Lesson, 1828)
- Islands and sanctuaries where North Island saddlebacks are present

Synonyms
- Philesturnus carunculatus rufusater

Audio
- Recording of a North Island saddleback song

= North Island saddleback =

Species of bird endemic to the North Island of New Zealand

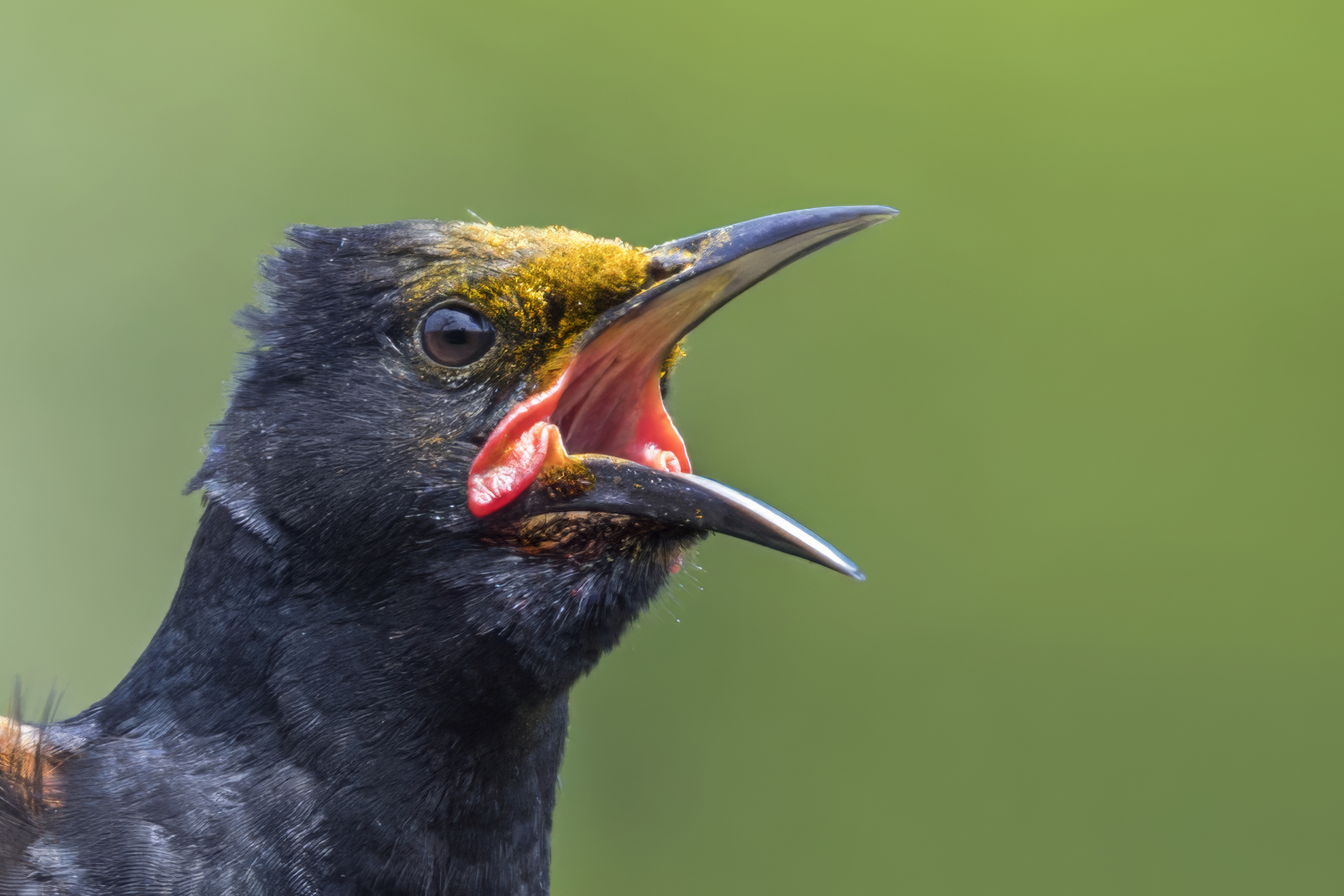

The North Island saddleback (Philesturnus rufusater) is a forest-dwelling passerine bird species endemic to the North Island of New Zealand. It was once considered conspecific with the South Island saddleback. The IUCN lists the species as Near Threatened, while it is listed as a "relict" species in the New Zealand Threat Classification System. Saddlebacks are known in Māori as tīeke.

== Taxonomy and systematics ==
North Island saddleback at Orana Wildlife Park

René Lesson first described the species in 1828 from a specimen collected in the Bay of Islands four years earlier, using the binomial name Icterus rufusater. The specific name rufusater refers to the saddleback's plumage – a combination of the Latin words rufus 'reddish-brown', and ater 'black'. Their placement in the genus Icterus has since been revised, and the two saddleback species are now in their own genus, Philesturnus. The name of this genus, created by Isidore Geoffroy Saint-Hilaire in 1832, comes from a portmanteau of two genus names – Philemon (friarbirds) and Sturnus (starlings).

Historically, there has been some uncertainty over the status of the North Island saddleback as its own species. North Island and South Island saddlebacks were formerly considered to be two subspecies of Philesturnus carunculatus, with the North Island subspecies being designated P. c. rufusater. Today they are generally considered to be separate species, with the North Island saddlebacks having the binomial Philesturnus rufusater.

== Description ==
The plumage of North Island saddlebacks is mostly black apart from the saddle, rump, and tail coverts, which are chestnut. North Island saddlebacks are distinguished from South Island saddlebacks by a faint yellow lining on the superior edge of the saddle. The black bill is starling-like, with orange-red wattles hanging from its base. North Island saddlebacks have an average length of 25 cm. Males tend to be heavier (80 g) than females (69 g), and possess longer bills and larger wattles. North Island saddlebacks produce calls described as "cheet, te-te-te-te" or "ti-e-ke-ke-ke-ke". The Māori name for the bird, tīeke, is derived from the sound of this call.

== Distribution and habitat ==
North Island saddlebacks naturally occupy lowland broadleaf and coastal evergreen forests, though as a result of translocations, they are now also found in various other forest environments. Before the arrival of Europeans and the mammalian predators they introduced, North Island saddlebacks were widespread on the North Island mainland and offshore islands. A combination of deforestation and introduced predators – first brown rats and feral cats, then also black rats and mustelids – decimated these populations, and by the 1890s, the mainland population was eliminated, and the only remaining North Island saddlebacks were those on Hen Island, a small island off the coast of Northland.

=== Translocations ===
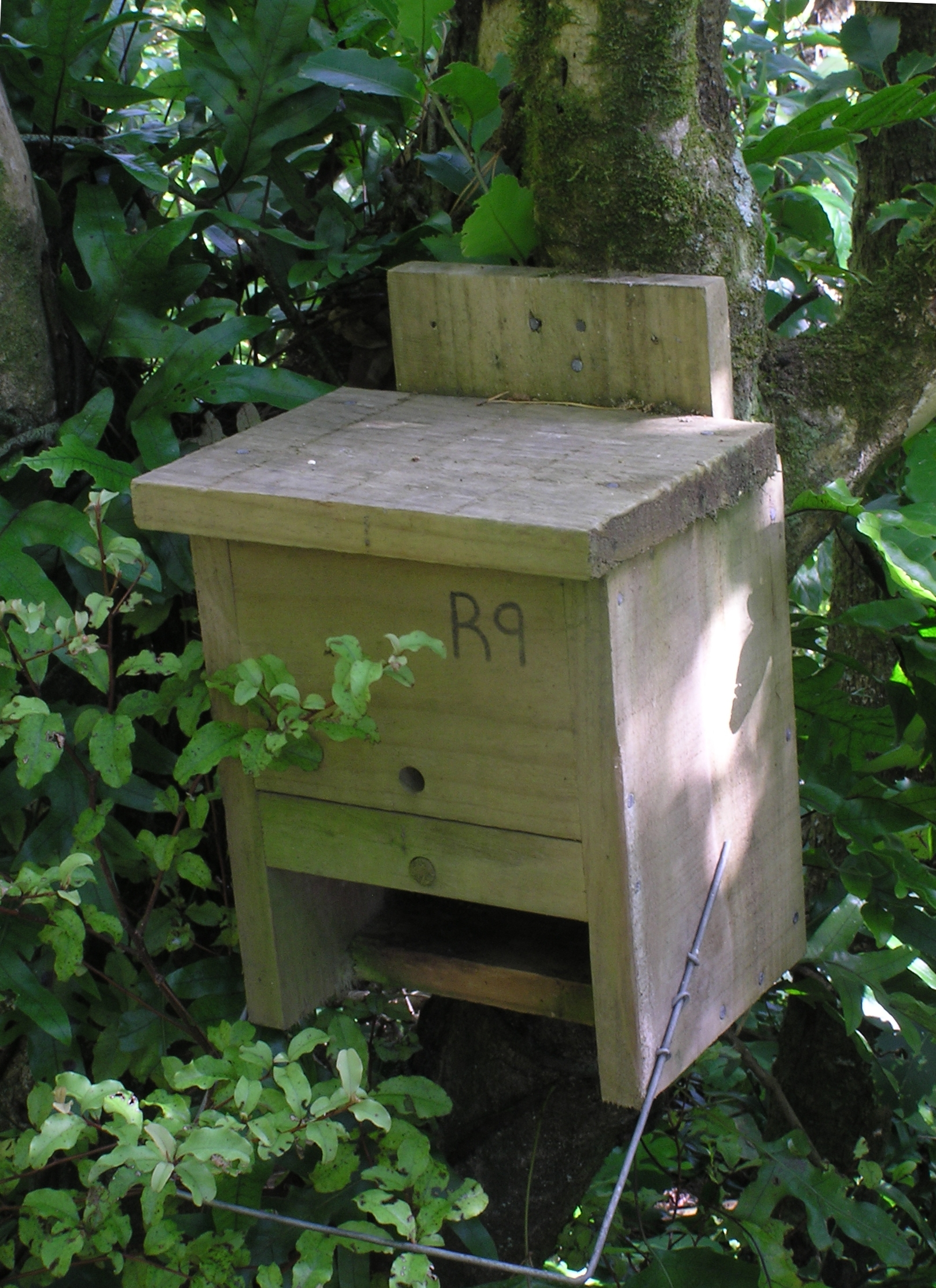
An artificial nest box for North Island saddleback at Zealandia

Translocation efforts by the New Zealand Wildlife Service began in 1964, with birds being transported to nearby Whatupuke Island (Middle Chicken Island). Following further translocations, the North Island saddleback inhabits a number of islands offshore (and onshore, at Lake Rotorua), including:

- Hen and Chicken Islands
  - Hen Island
  - Whatupuke Island
  - Lady Alice Island
  - Coppermine Island (colonized)
- Little Barrier Island
- Tiritiri Matangi Island
- Cuvier Island
- Mercury Islands
  - Red Mercury Island
  - Stanley Island
- Moutohora Island (Whale Island)
- Mokoia Island, Lake Rotorua
- Kapiti Island
- Motuihe Island
- Rangitoto Island
- Motutapu Island

North Island saddlebacks were first re-introduced to the mainland in 2002, at the Karori Wildlife Sanctuary (now known as Zealandia) in Wellington. They have since started breeding outside the predator-proof sanctuary. They have also been introduced at several other mainland sanctuaries. North Island saddlebacks have become very dense on some offshore islands and the total population has increased to about 10,000.

== Behaviour and ecology ==
=== Breeding ===
North Island saddlebacks are monogamous and usually mate for life. The breeding season can vary from year to year and location to location, though clutches typically start appearing from August to April. Fledgling saddlebacks are often seen until March and April. Saddleback nests are mostly built in tree cavities within three metres of the ground. They lay up to four eggs per clutch.

=== Food and feeding ===
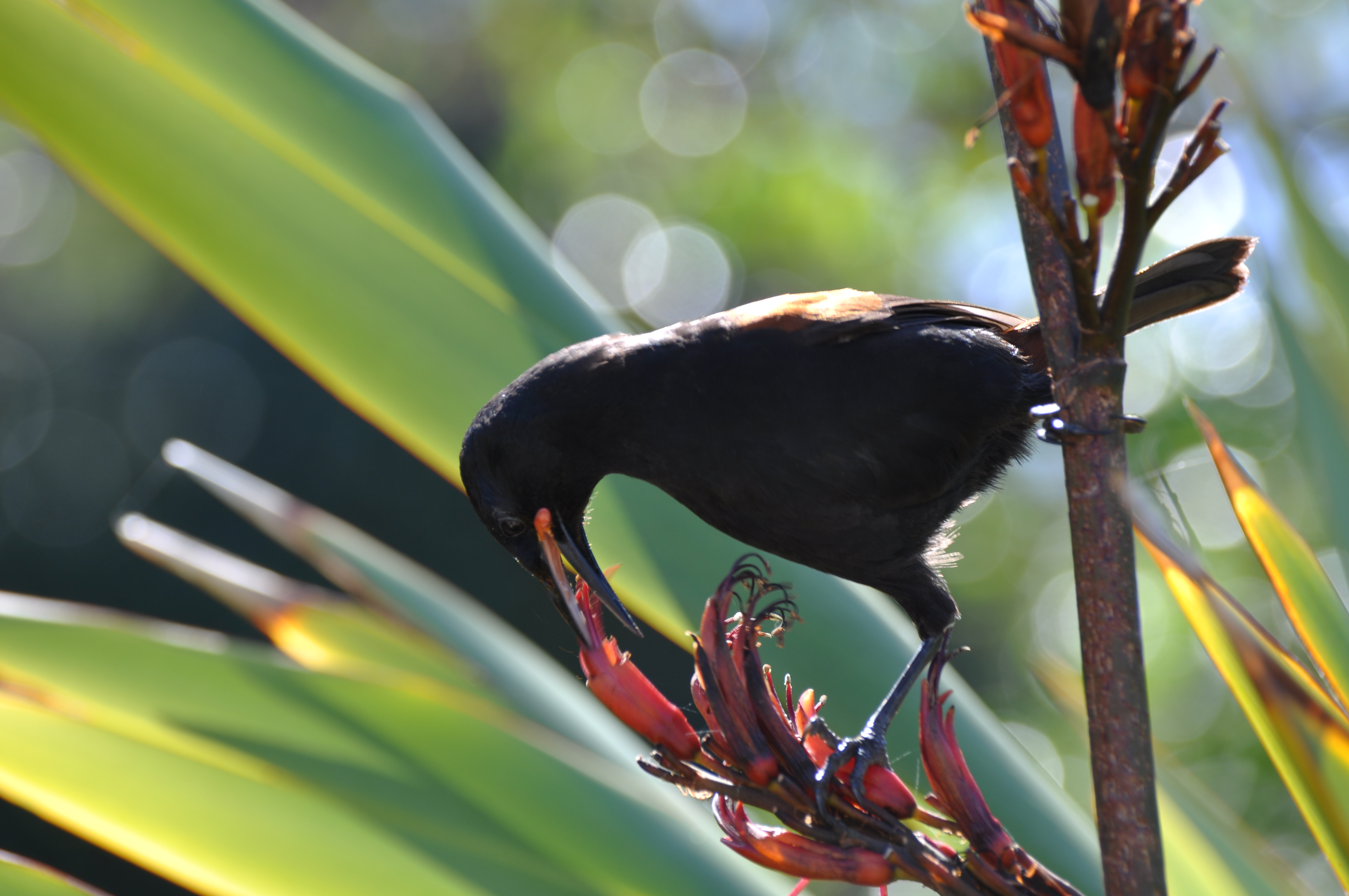
Saddleback feeding on nectar from a flax flower

The diet of North Island saddlebacks mostly consists of insects and other invertebrates, berries, and nectar. Their bill allows them to force open dead wood to expose insects such as grubs. In forests, saddlebacks forage at all heights, but tend to spend most of the time on the forest floor browsing in leaf litter.

=== Threats ===
Introduced mammalian predators, particularly brown rats, were the primary cause of the North Island saddleback's extinction from mainland New Zealand. Saddlebacks are particularly susceptible to predation because of their tendency to roost and nest close to the ground. Several translocations of North Island saddlebacks were made to Kapiti Island between 1981 and 1990, but the population suffered high mortality due to rat predation (rats were not eradicated until 1998). Today, North Island saddleback populations are usually found on predator-free islands and in sanctuaries protected by pest fences, affording the birds protection from these predators. North Island saddlebacks appear to be capable of co-existing with some predators such as the kiore, possibly because they have had a longer history of cohabitation than with brown and black rats. Current efforts are focused towards exterminating pests surrounding mainland sanctuaries, to allow the saddlebacks to successfully expand outside of the sanctuaries.

South Island saddlebacks have been affected by avian malaria and avian pox; this has not yet spread to the North Island saddlebacks, but there are concerns that it may do so in the future.
