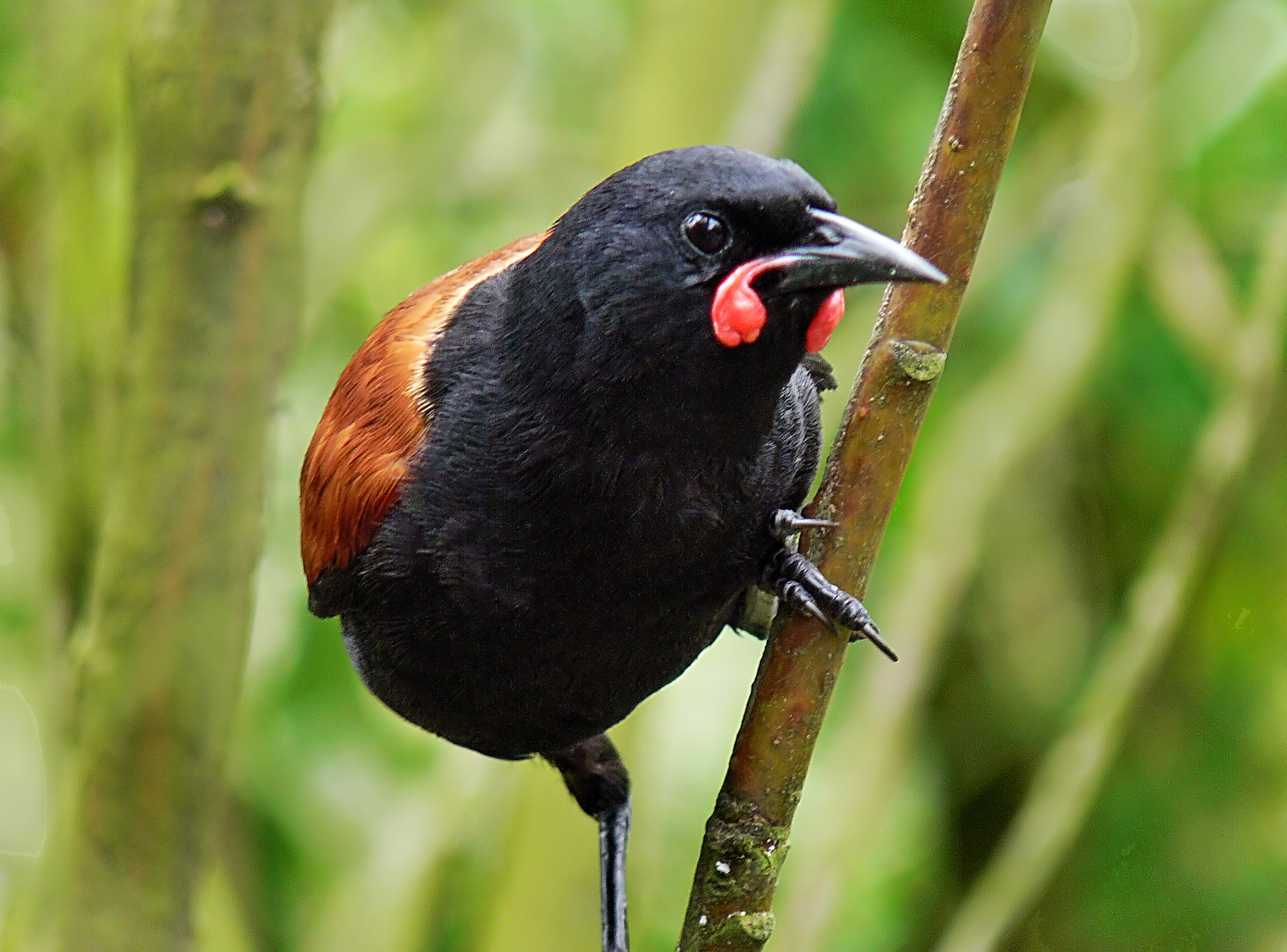

Conservation status
- Least Concern (IUCN 3.1)

Scientific classification
- Kingdom: Animalia
- Phylum: Chordata
- Class: Aves
- Order: Passeriformes
- Family: Callaeidae
- Genus: Philesturnus
- Species: P. carunculatus

Binomial name
- Philesturnus carunculatus (Gmelin, JF, 1789)
- Islands and sanctuaries in the South Island where South Island saddlebacks are located

Synonyms
- Creadion carunculatus Philesturnus carunculatus carunculatus Sturnus carunculatus

= South Island saddleback =

Species of bird

The South Island saddleback or tīeke (Philesturnus carunculatus) is a forest-dwelling passerine bird in the New Zealand wattlebird family which is endemic to the South Island of New Zealand. Both the North Island saddleback and this species were formerly considered conspecific. The Department of Conservation currently has the South Island saddleback listed as At Risk--Declining.

== Taxonomy ==
South Island saddleback showing the saddle and wattles (Ulva Island)

The South Island saddleback was first formally described in 1789 by the German naturalist Johann Friedrich Gmelin in his revised and expanded edition of Carl Linnaeus's Systema Naturae. He placed it with the starlings in the genus Sturnus and coined the binomial name Sturnus carunculatus. The specific epithet carunculatus is Latin for a small piece of flesh, hence wattles. Gmelin based his description on the "wattled stare" that had been described and illustrated in 1783 by the English ornithologist John Latham in his book A General Synopsis of Birds. Latham has examined a specimen in the collection of the Leverian Museum in London that had come from New Zealand. The word "stare" is an archaic word for a starling. The South Island saddleback is now placed with the North Island saddleback in the genus Philesturnus that was introduced in 1832 by the French zoologist Isidore Geoffroy Saint-Hilaire.

== Distribution and habitat ==
During the early 19th century, South Island saddlebacks were widely distributed throughout the South and Stewart Islands. However, by the end of the century, the species was in decline and nearing extinction due to introduced predators. By 1905, the saddlebacks were confined to the South Cape Islands, off the coast of Stewart Island. In 1962, ship rats were introduced to Big South Cape Island, causing the extinction of the greater short-tailed bat, Stewart Island snipe and the Stead's bush wren.

In early 1964, 36 individuals on Big South Cape Island were translocated by the New Zealand Wildlife Service to pest-free islands. Big Island received 21 individuals, whilst Kaimohu Island received 15. Further translocations and predator removal allowed the population to recover, with the current population estimated to be around 2000.

== Behaviour and ecology ==
=== Threats ===
The South Island saddleback is at risk of outbreaks of avian malaria and avian pox - two outbreaks in 2002 and 2007 resulted in high mortality rates among those infected. Saddlebacks are especially vulnerable as they have had limited exposure to avian malaria, due to the disease's relatively short history in New Zealand.

== Conservation ==
A threatened species recovery plan was established by the Department of Conservation in 1994, with the aims of maintaining wild populations, adopting quarantine procedures, and removing predators from islands potentially suitable for translocating members of the species.

== In Māori culture ==
In Māori mythology, the orange mark was caused by the demi-god Māui asked the tīeke to fetch him some water but the bird refused and pretended not to have heard him. Consequently, Māui grabbed the tīeke and scorched the feathers of its back, and have since become an important bird for Māori.
