= Moutohora Island =

Island in the Bay of Plenty, New Zealand

- Moutohorā (Māori)
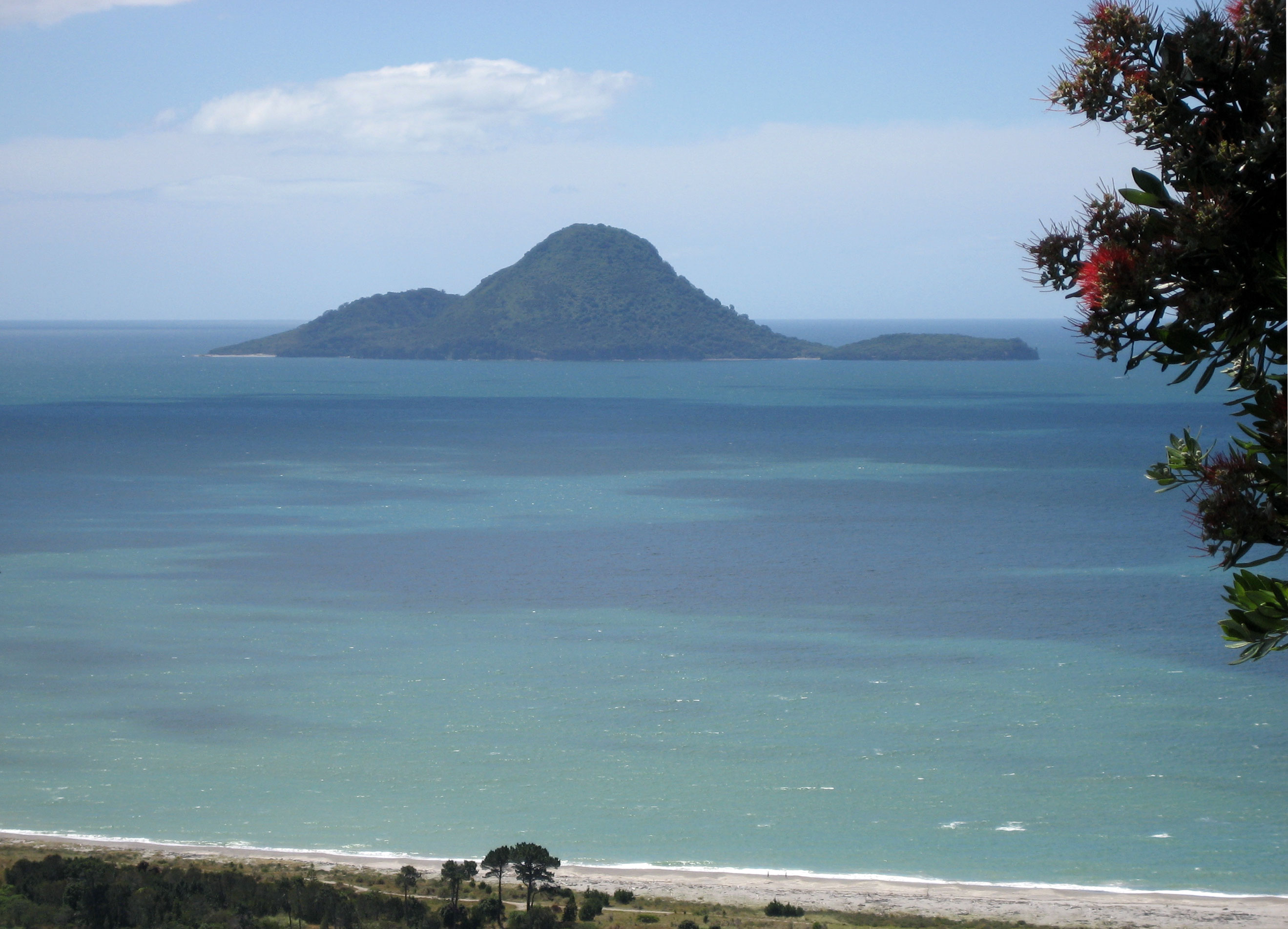
- Moutohora Island seen from the south.

Highest point
- Elevation: 353 m (1,158 ft)
- Prominence: 353 m (1,158 ft)
- Coordinates: 37°51′22″S 176°58′23″E

Geography
- Location: Bay of Plenty, North Island, New Zealand

Geology
- Mountain type: Complex volcano
- Last eruption: Pleistocene
- Moutohorā Island surface volcanics map with the predominant basaltic andesite coloured orange-red. Clicking on the map enlarges it, and enables panning and mouseover of nearby volcanic feature name/wikilink and ages before present. The key to the other volcanics that are shown with panning is basalt - brown, monogenetic basalts - dark brown, undifferentiated basalts of the Tangihua Complex in Northland Allochthon - light brown, arc basalts - deep orange brown, arc ring basalts -orange brown, andesite - red, dacite - purple, rhyolite - violet, ignimbrite (lighter shades of violet), and plutonic - gray.

Moutohora Island (previously known as Whale Island) (Māori: Moutohorā) is a small uninhabited island located off the Bay of Plenty coast of New Zealand's North Island, about 9 kilometres (5.6 mi) north of the town of Whakatāne. The 1.43 km^{2} (0.55 sq mi) island is a remnant of a complex volcano which has eroded, leaving two peaks. This is still an area of volcanic activity and there are hot springs on the island in Sulphur Valley, McEwans Bay, and Sulphur Bay.

== Name ==
The Māori name, Moutohorā, is a contracted form of Motutohorā, meaning "Whale Island" or "Captured Whale". The spelling "Moutohorā" (with a macron) is sometimes also used in English, although the official name of the island omits it. The spelling "Motuhora" is also used. (Tohorā is the Māori name for the southern right whale.)

== History ==
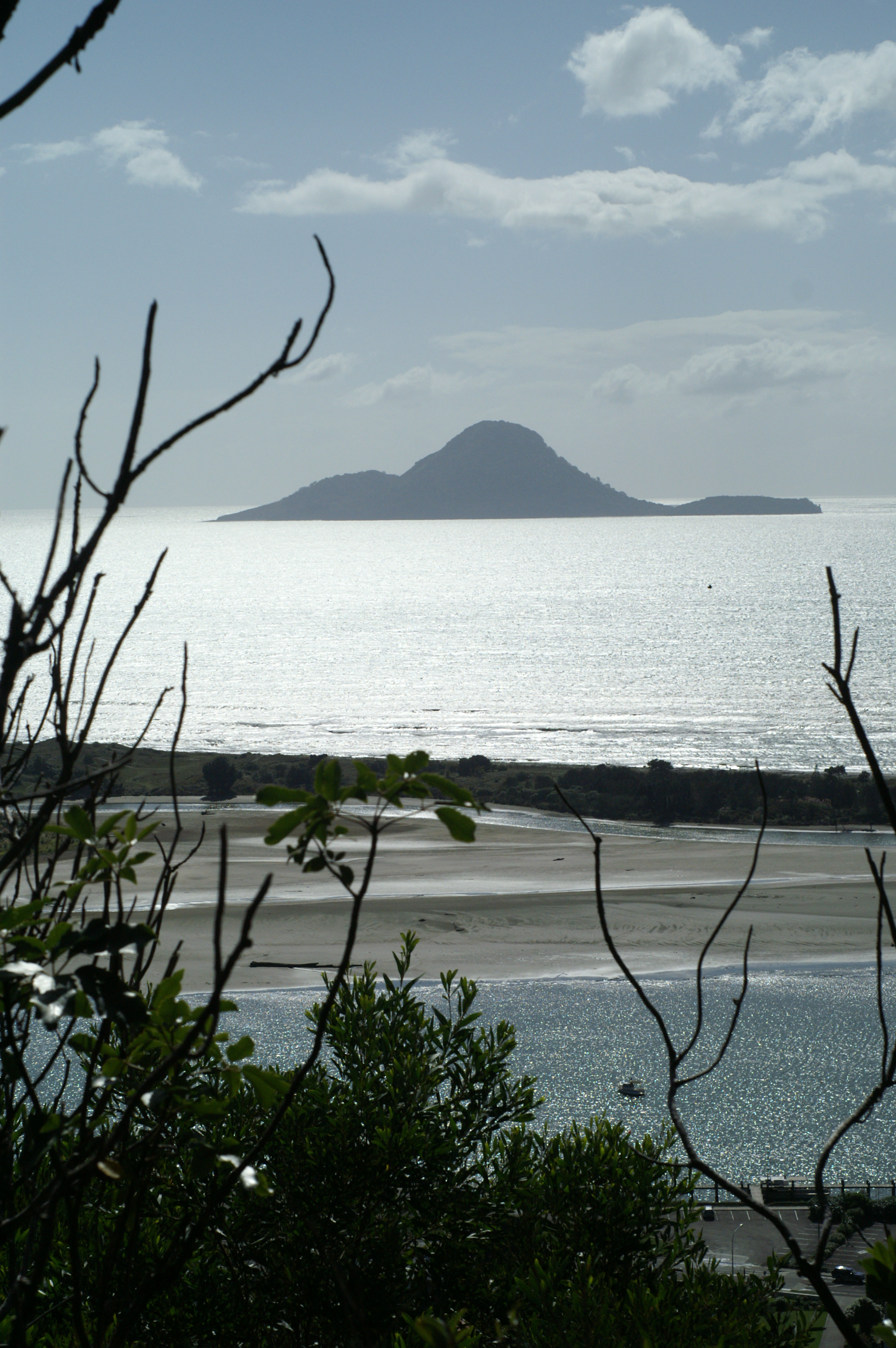
Whale Island from the Kohi Point Walkway close to Whakatāne.

Numerous archaeological sites of both Māori and European origin have been recorded, including an extensive pa (fortified earthworks) site on Pa Hill and a number of house terraces and garden sites, middens (food refuse dumps), stone tool manufacture areas and stone walls. After permanent Maori occupation ceased in the early nineteenth century, Ngāti Awa and Tūhoe continued to visit the island for sea food and muttonbirds and to collect stones for hāngī (underground ovens).

The first European occupation came in the 1830s with an unsuccessful attempt to establish a shore-based whaling station. The venture failed without a single whale being captured. Forty years later came attempts to make money from sulphur. It was extracted and sold to a refinery in Auckland over a number of years but was of poor quality, and the venture was abandoned in 1895. The next phase of industrial activity came in 1915, when quarrying provided rock for the construction of the Whakatāne harbour wall. A total of 26,000 tonnes (25,589 long tons; 28,660 short tons) of rock was removed over five years.

== Local government ==
The island is not included in the boundaries of a territorial authority council (district council) and the Minister of Local Government is its territorial authority, with support from the Department of Internal Affairs.

== Ecology ==
In 1965, Moutohora was declared as a wildlife refuge, named as Moutohora Wildlife Management Reserve, and the island was bought by the Crown in 1984. Once the goats which had been introduced to the island were eradicated, a planting programme began and 12,000 plants covering 45 species are now established. Today Moutohora is covered with a mosaic of pōhutukawa, māhoe, kānuka, bracken and grassland.

There are 190 native and 110 introduced plant species. The island is now completely free of the goats, rats, cats and rabbits which previously devastated native plants and animals. The most significant feature of Moutohora's current fauna is the breeding colony of grey-faced petrels. Sooty shearwaters, little blue penguins, the threatened New Zealand dotterel and variable oystercatchers also breed on the island. Threatened species which are occasional visitors are the Caspian tern, the North Island kaka and New Zealand falcon. Other species present include common forest birds, captive-bred red crowned parakeets, three lizard species and fur seals. Surrounding areas hosts rich marine ecosystem including cetaceans, oceanic birds, sharks. Most common of cetaceans are smaller species such as common and bottlenose dolphins, pilot whales, and killer whales while larger migratory baleen whales (southern rights and rorquals) and toothed whales including beaked whales also appear from time to time.

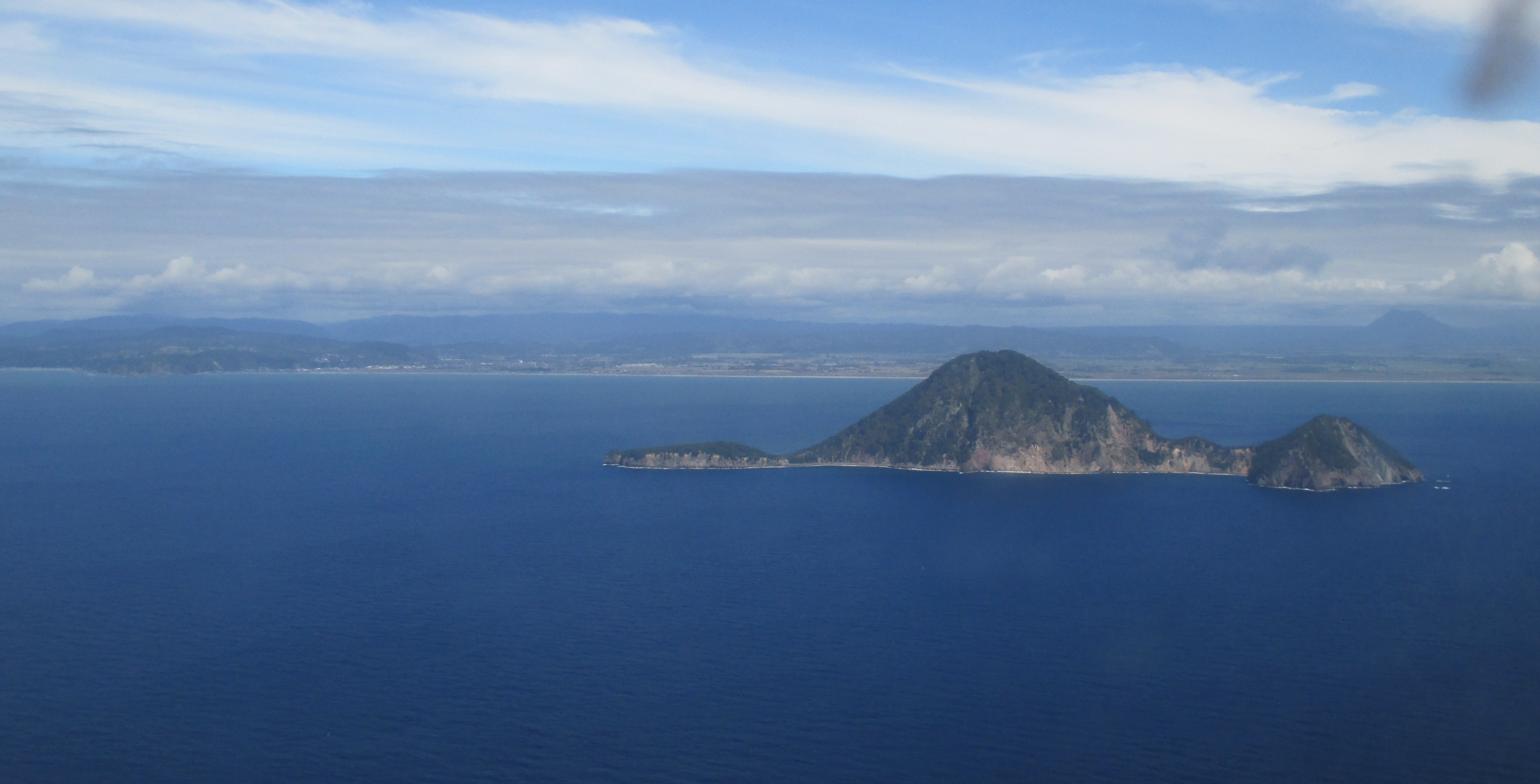
Whale / Moutohora Island - from the North. Whakatāne to LHS & Putauaki / Mt Edgecumbe in the distance on RHS

In March 1999, local Ngati Awa and the New Zealand Department of Conservation joined forces to see the fulfilment of a dream. Forty North Island saddleback (tieke) were transferred from Cuvier Island (Repanga), off the coast of the Coromandel Peninsula, to Moutohora.

This relocation followed the traditional flight made centuries ago when the Mataatua waka (canoe) was accompanied by two tīeke from Repanga to Whakatāne. This flight followed the drowning of the twin sons of Muriwai, sister of Toroa, the captain of the waka. The two tieke settled briefly on Moutohora before returning to Cuvier Island.

== Access ==
Public access to Moutohora is restricted to Department of Conservation concession holders and approved scientific parties. During periods of high fire danger all access may be declined. The current concession holders are the local Maori tribe of Ngati Awa and tourist operators.

== In popular culture ==
In the fictional Harry Potter universe, Moutohora is the home of a professional Quidditch team, the Moutohora Macaws. The team players wear robes of red, yellow and blue.

== See also ==
- List of volcanoes in New Zealand
- List of islands of New Zealand
- List of islands
- Desert island
