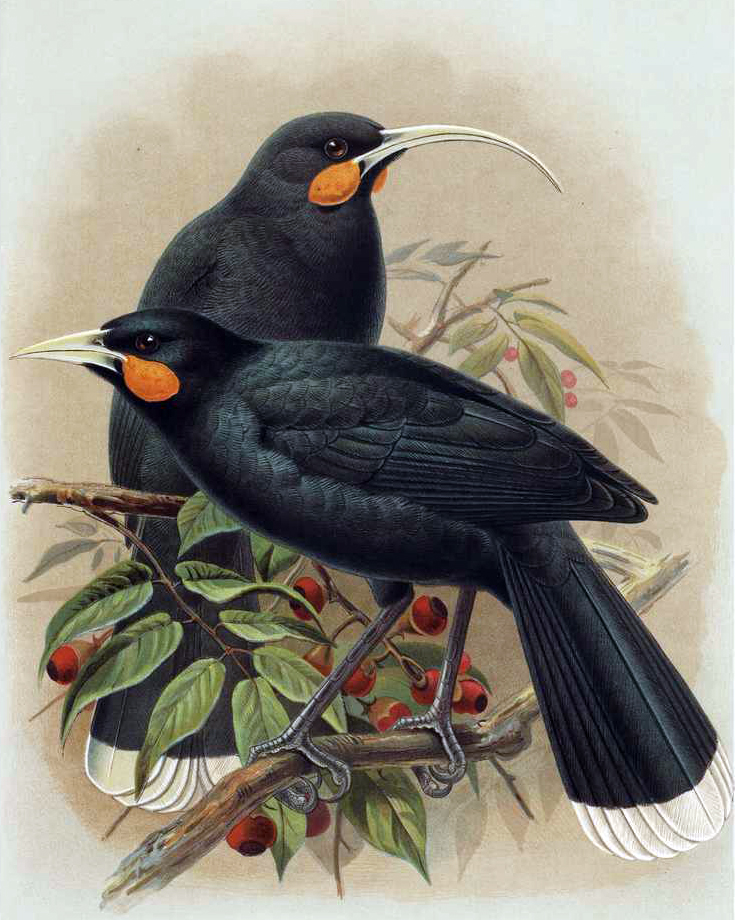
- Huia (Heteralocha acutirostris)

Scientific classification
- Kingdom: Animalia
- Phylum: Chordata
- Class: Aves
- Order: Passeriformes
- Infraorder: Passerides
- Family: Callaeidae; Sundevall, 1836

Genera
- Callaeas; Philesturnus; Heteralocha

= Callaeidae =

New Zealand wattlebirds

Family of birds

Callaeidae (sometimes Callaeatidae) is a family of passerine birds endemic to New Zealand. It contains three genera, with five species in the family. One species, the huia, became extinct early in the 20th century, while the South Island kokako is critically endangered and may be extinct.

Although sometimes known as wattled crows, they are not corvids and are only distantly related to crows – New Zealand wattlebirds is the informal name for this family used by the scientific community.

== Biology and evolution ==
They are ground-dwelling songbirds, 26–38 cm in length. They inhabit dense forests, where they feed on insects. They have strong legs and featherless wattles behind the bill. Their wings are rounded and unusually weak, giving them very limited powers of flight. They are monogamous and maintain permanent territories.

These birds seem to be remnants of an early expansion of passerines to New Zealand. Their only close relative is the stitchbird.

The phylogenetic relationships between the species shown below is based on a study published in 2022. The South Island saddleback (Philesturnus carunculatus) was not sampled.

- - Notiomystidae
    Notiomystis cincta – stitchbird
  - Callaeidae
    - Callaeas
      - Callaeas wilsoni – North Island kokako
      - Callaeas cinereus – South Island kokako (possibly extinct)
    - - Philesturnus
        Philesturnus rufusater – North Island saddleback
      - Heteralocha
        Heteralocha acutirostris – Huia (extinct)

== Species ==
- Genus Callaeas
  - North Island kokako, Callaeas wilsoni
  - South Island kokako, Callaeas cinereus (possibly extinct)
- Genus Philesturnus
  - North Island saddleback, Philesturnus rufusater
  - South Island saddleback, Philesturnus carunculatus
- Genus Heteralocha
  - Huia, Heteralocha acutirostris (extinct)

== Gallery ==
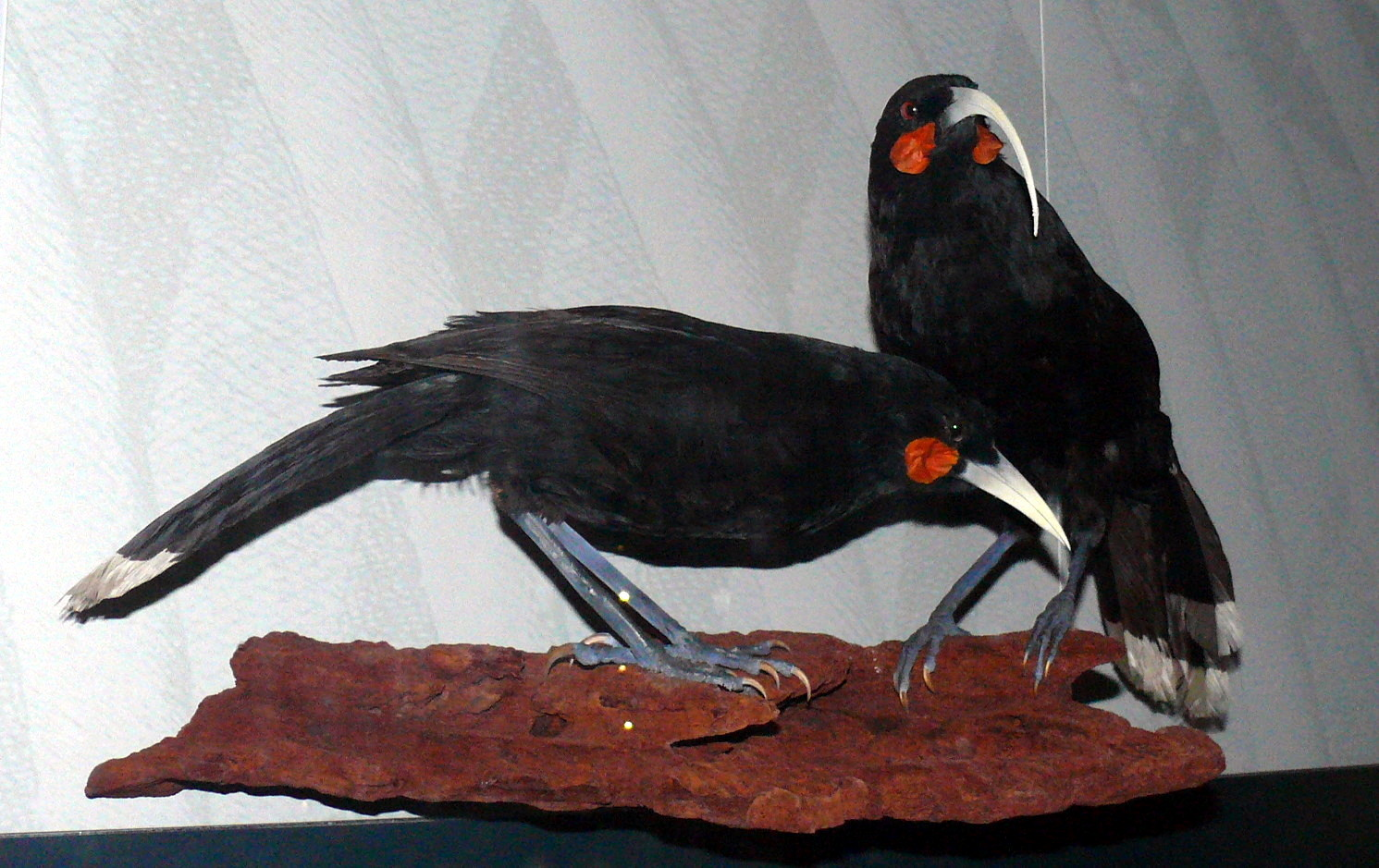
Huia, Heteralocha acutirostris (extinct)

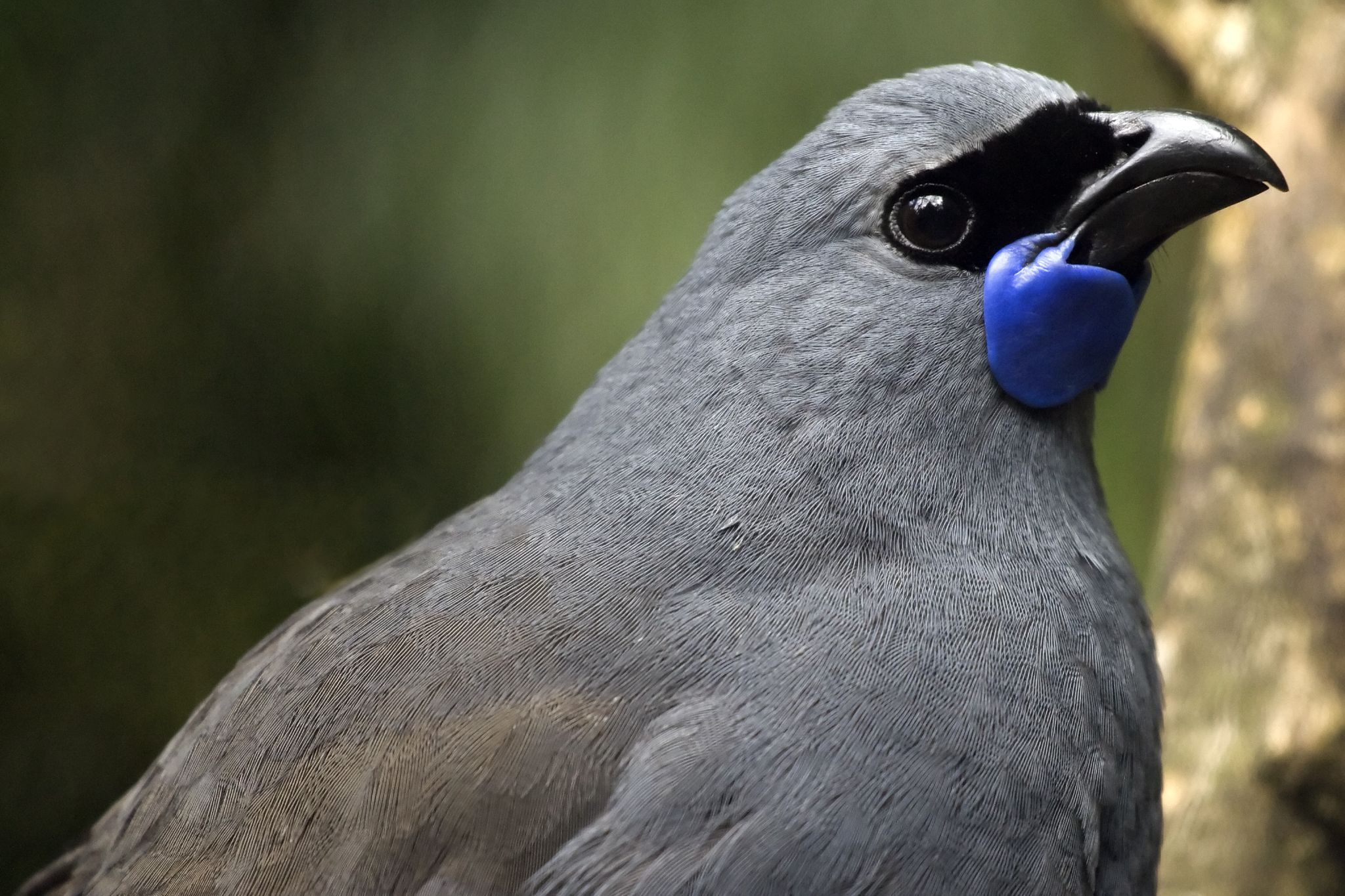
North Island kokako, Callaeas wilsoni

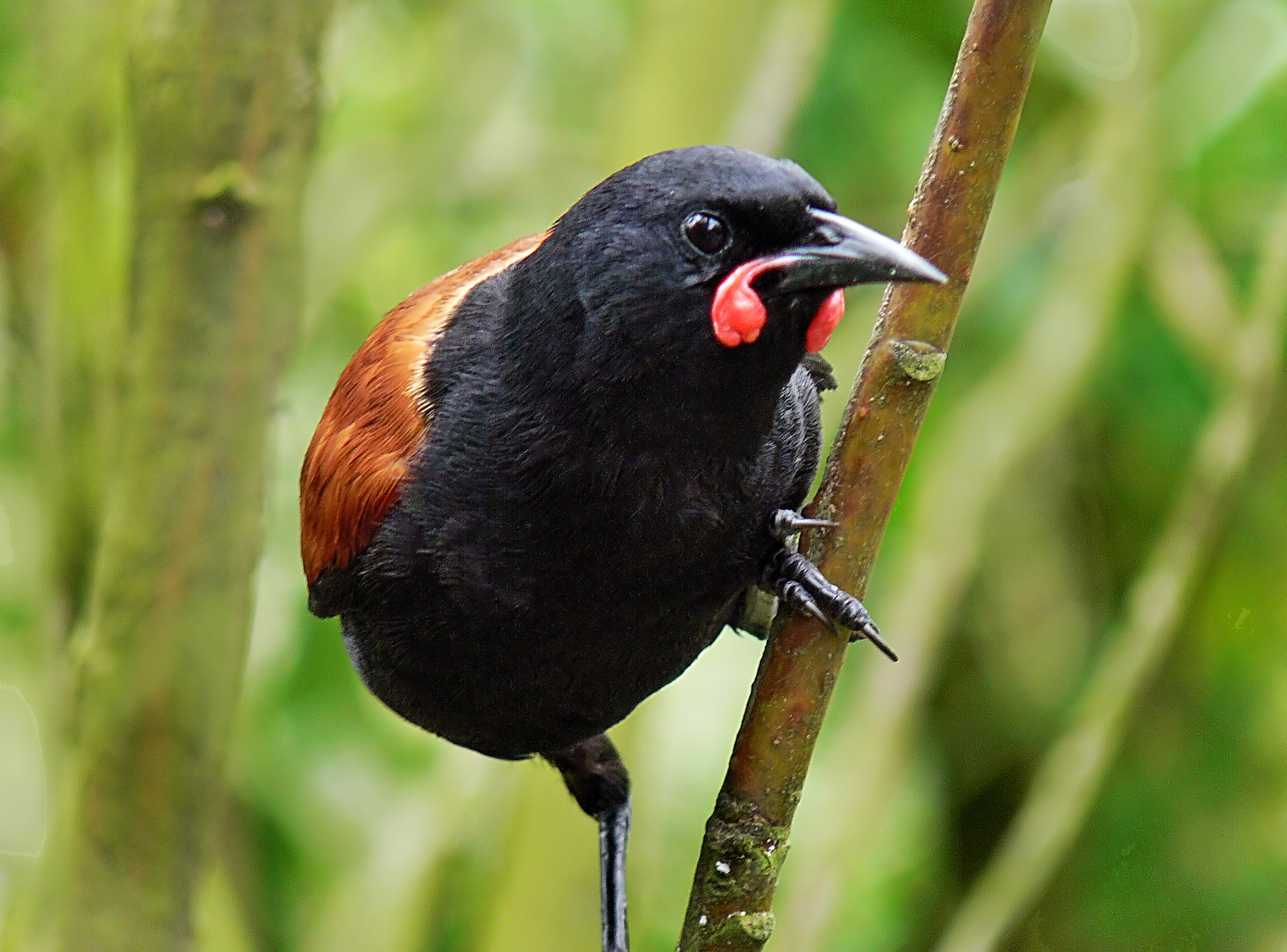
South Island saddleback
Philesturnus carunculatus

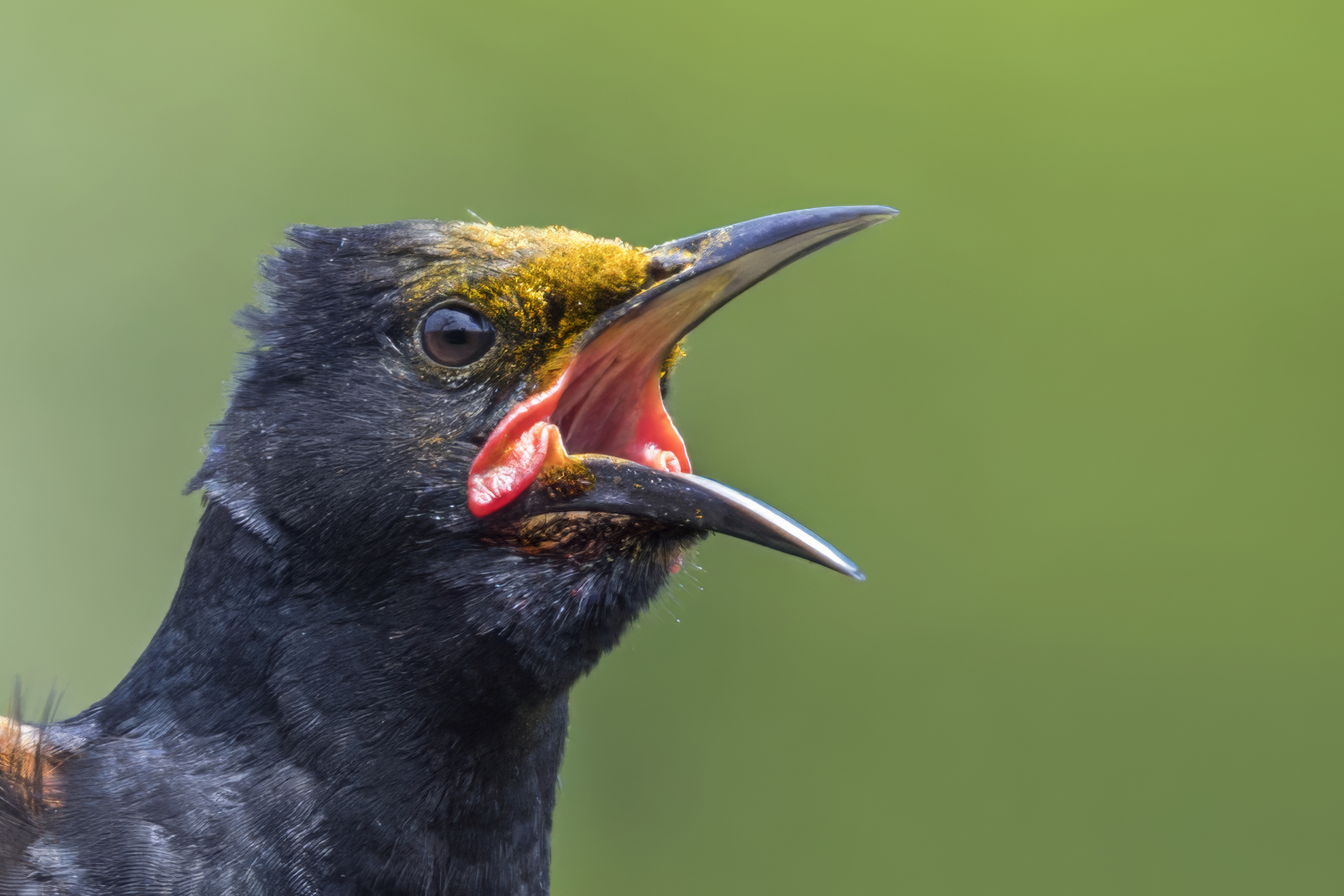
North Island saddleback
Philesturnus rufusater
