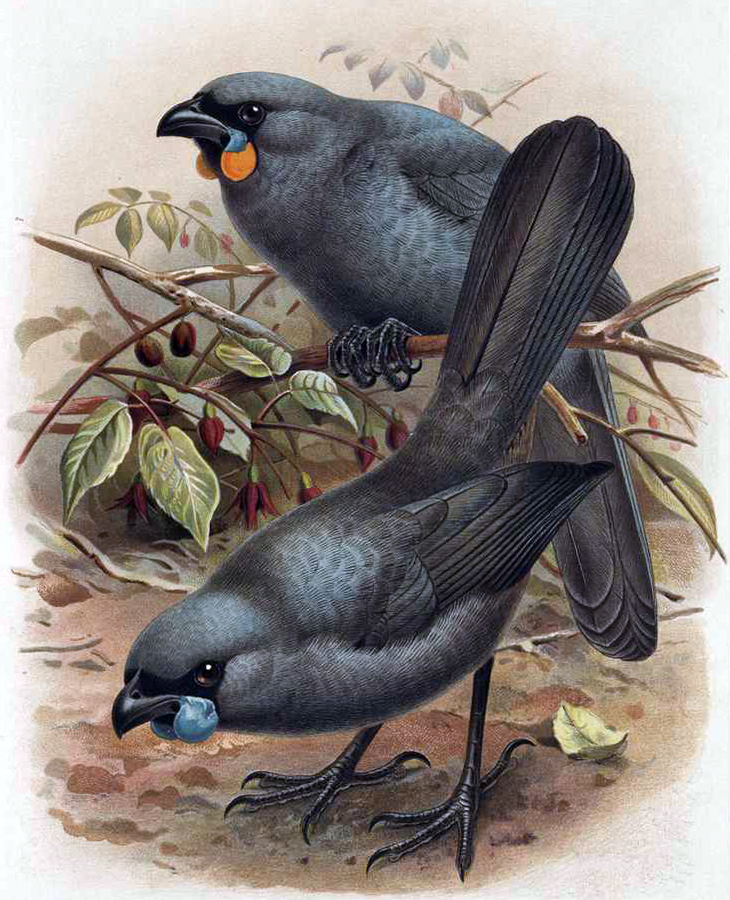
- North Island kōkako (front) and South Island kōkako (rear)

Conservation status
- Critically endangered, possibly extinct (IUCN 3.1)

- Data Deficit (NZ TCS)

Scientific classification
- Kingdom: Animalia
- Phylum: Chordata
- Class: Aves
- Order: Passeriformes
- Family: Callaeidae
- Genus: Callaeas
- Species: C. cinereus

Binomial name
- Callaeas cinereus (Gmelin, JF, 1788)
- Estimated maximum distribution Estimated distribution around time of European settlement

Synonyms
- Callaeas cinerea (J. F. Gmelin, 1788); Callaeas cinereus (Gmelin, JF, 1788); Callaeus cinerea Gmelin, JF, 1788; Glaucopis cinerea J. F. Gmelin, 1788; Glaucopsis cinerea Gmelin, JF, 1788; Callaeas cinereus cinereus (J. F. Gmelin, 1788); Callaeas olivacens Pelzeln, A, 1867; Callaeus cinerea cinerea Gmelin, JF, 1788; Glaucopis cinerea cinerea Gmelin, JF, 1788

= South Island kōkako =

Species of bird

The South Island kōkako (Callaeas cinereus) is a forest bird endemic to the South Island and Stewart Island of New Zealand. Unlike its close relative, the North Island kōkako (C. wilsoni), it has largely orange wattles, with only a small patch of blue at the base, and was also known as the orange-wattled crow (though it was not a corvid). The last accepted sighting in 2007 was the first considered genuine since 1967, although there have been several other unauthenticated reports – (and see note about search campaign below).

In 2012 the Department of Conservation revised its criteria for species extinction to be consistent with international standards, meaning that "there is no reasonable doubt that the last individual has died", and only after "exhaustive surveys" of its known range have failed. After this change, the possible sighting of the bird near Reefton in 2007 was accepted. That decision was not unanimous: the panel chair didn't believe it, and doesn't believe that the bird still exists despite his name being associated with its 'rediscovery'. A department report said that the species was most likely "functionally extinct", but "we are not convinced beyond reasonable doubt that the last individual of these taxa have died".

== Taxonomy ==
The South Island kōkako was formally described in 1788 by the German naturalist Johann Friedrich Gmelin in his revised and expanded edition of Carl Linnaeus's Systema Naturae. He coined the binomial name Glaucopis cinerea. The specific epithet cinereus is Latin meaning "ash-grey" or "ash-coloured". Gmelin based his description on the "cinereous wattle-bird" that had been described and illustrated in 1781 by the English ornithologist John Latham in his book A General Synopsis of Birds. Latham had examined a specimen in the Leverian Museum in London that had come from New Zealand.

The North Island kōkako was formerly considered as subspecies of Callaeas cinereus, but since 2001 North Island birds have been officially recognised as C. wilsoni, and genetic evidence confirms their difference.

== Description ==
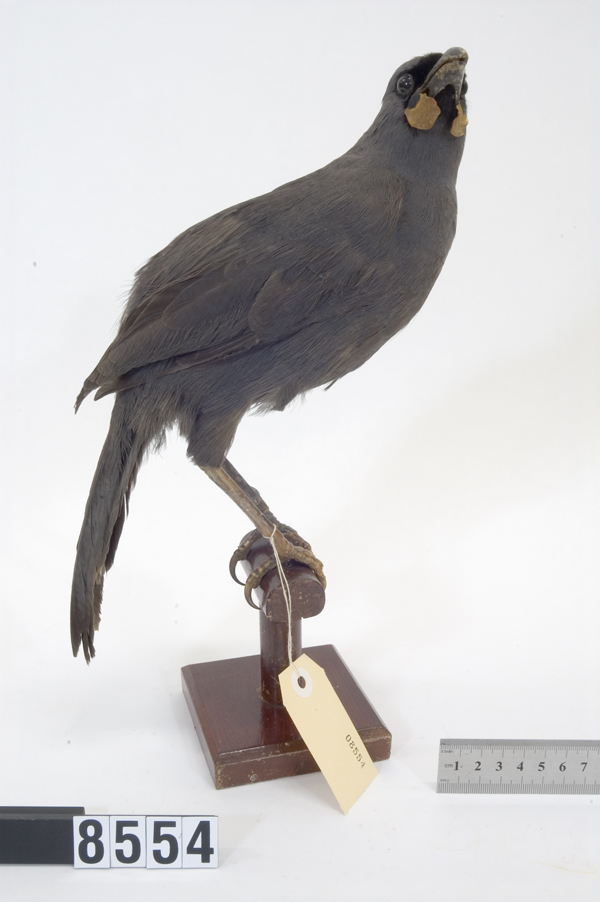
Specimen from the Auckland Museum collection

Like the North Island kōkako, this was a slate-grey bird with long legs and a small black mask; Reischek considered its plumage slightly lighter than the North Island species. Its wattles were distinctly orange in colour with a dark blue base; young birds had much lighter wattles. It seems to have spent more time on the ground than the North Island species, but been a better flier. They have an average weight of 230g. Kōkako have distinctive organ- and flute-like duetting calls. Early explorer Charlie Douglas described the South Island kōkako call: "Their notes are very few, but the sweetest and most mellow toned I ever heard a bird produce." Based on extant records, South Island kōkako eggs were larger than their North Island counterparts.

== Distribution ==
At the time of European settlement, South Island kōkako were found on the West Coast from northwest Nelson to Fiordland, as well as Stewart Island, Banks Peninsula, and the Catlins. Subfossil bones suggest they were formerly found throughout the South Island, but forest burning by Māori eliminated them from dry eastern lowland forest. Introduced mammalian predators and forest clearance by settlers reduced their numbers further: by 1900 the bird was uncommon in the South Island and Stewart Island, and had almost disappeared by 1960. Its vulnerability compared to the North Island species was perhaps due to its foraging and nesting close to the ground.

== Conservation status ==
The South Island kōkako was formally declared extinct by the Department of Conservation in 2007, as it had been 40 years since the last authenticated sighting at Mount Aspiring / Tititea in 1967. In November 2013, however, the Ornithological Society of New Zealand accepted as genuine a reported sighting by two people near Reefton in 2007, and changed the bird's New Zealand Threat Classification status from "extinct" to "data deficient". Eleven other sightings from 1990 to 2008 were considered to be only "possible" or "probable".

A supposed kōkako feather was found in 1995, but examination by scientists at the National Museum showed it to be from a blackbird, though doubt over this conclusion exists due to the morphology of the feather and the identity of the feather used for the DNA test. In 2025 further DNA testing confirmed the results of the 1995 test. Unconfirmed sightings of South Island kōkako and reports of calls have continued, with potential sightings in 2006, 2014, and 2016, but no authenticated recent remains, feathers, droppings, video, or photographs exist. The IUCN Red List status of the species is, as of 2016, Critically Endangered (Possibly Extinct). There was most an unconfirmed sighting in November 2018, in the Heaphy Track in Kahurangi National Park. A potential kōkako call, consisting of a "a distinct couple of soft long notes" was recorded at Heaphy Track on 29 December 2021, followed by a sighting of "a bird of the right size and colour". There was another possible sighting in 2024.

The South Island Kōkako Charitable Trust was formed in 2010 with the aim to confirm the survival of the South Island kōkako, so that the bird can be conserved appropriately. Their public search campaign, launched in January 2017 and with over 430 reports of possible encounters to February 2024, has a $10,000 reward on offer for evidence, likely a photograph or video, which would need to be verified by an independent expert prior to payment.
