= New Zealand Wildlife Service =

- Logo featuring the kōtuku

Agency overview
- Formed: 1945
- Dissolved: 1987
- Jurisdiction: New Zealand

The New Zealand Wildlife Service was a division of the Department of Internal Affairs responsible for managing wildlife in New Zealand. It was established in 1945 (as the Wildlife Branch) in order to unify wildlife administration and operations that were being carried out by the department.

The Conservation Act 1987 established the Department of Conservation. The New Zealand Wildlife Service was subsequently dissolved, and its roles and staff were transferred to the newly formed department.

== See also ==
- Conservation in New Zealand
