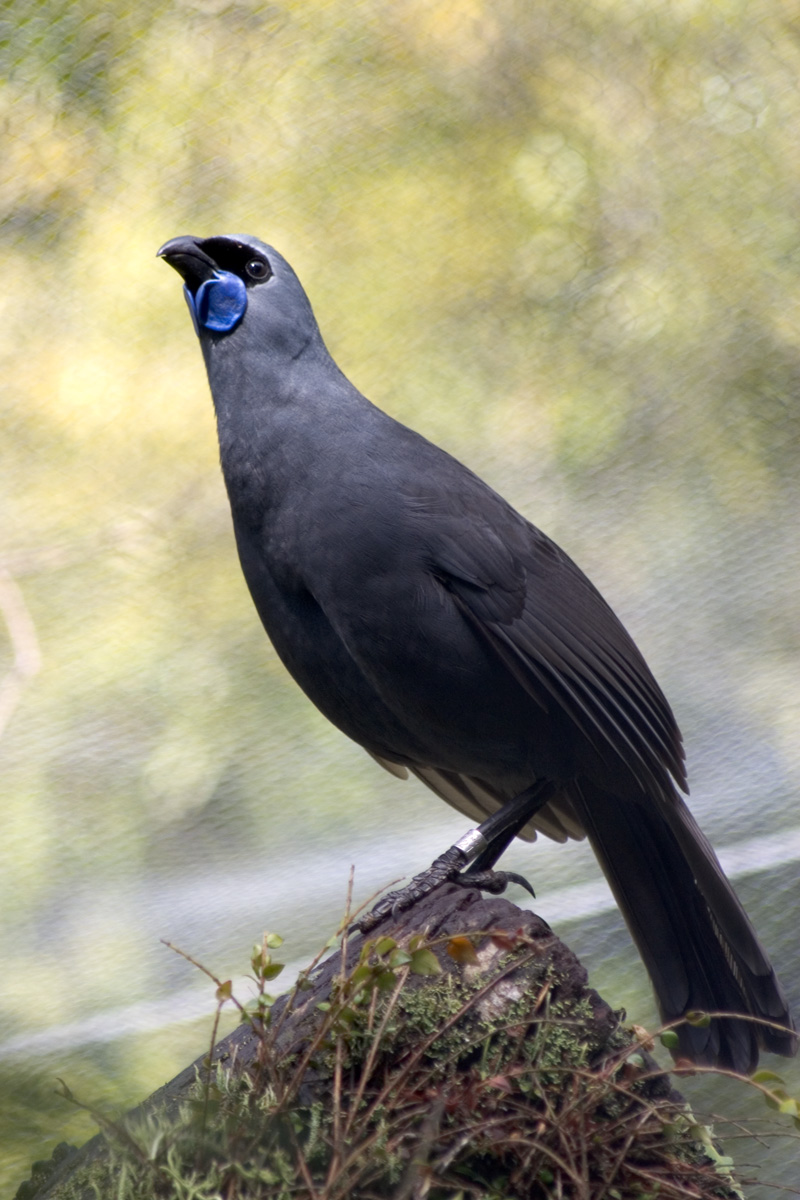

Conservation status
- Least Concern (IUCN 3.1)

- Nationally Increasing (NZ TCS)

Scientific classification
- Kingdom: Animalia
- Phylum: Chordata
- Class: Aves
- Order: Passeriformes
- Family: Callaeidae
- Genus: Callaeas
- Species: C. wilsoni

Binomial name
- Callaeas wilsoni (Bonaparte, 1850)

Synonyms
- C. cinereus wilsoni

Audio
- Song of a North Island kōkako

= North Island kōkako =

Species of bird

The North Island kōkako (Callaeas wilsoni) is a forest bird endemic to the North Island of New Zealand. It is grey in colour, with a small black mask. Adults have distinctive blue wattles, earning the species the moniker of blue-wattled crow, though they are not corvids. The name "kōkako" comes from its vocalization: the bird's main call has been described as a "slow, rich 'ko-ka-ko-o-o-o', trailing off at the end".

== Physical features ==
The North Island kōkako can be identified by its silky grey plumage and by a pair of blue, fleshy wattles at the base of the bill. Its overall colouration is a soft, slate-grey to smoky blue hue that envelops its entire body with slightly darker colouring on the wings and tail.

The face of the kōkako features a black facial mask that covers the area around the eyes and extends to the base of the bill, which is relatively short and curves slightly downward. Its bill is black and sturdy, and is suited to the bird's omnivorous diet of fruits, leaves, and invertebrates.

The species' most notable feature is its vivid blue wattles—fleshy, pendulous structures that hang loosely from either side of the lower mandible. These wattles are typically a saturated cobalt or ultramarine blue, with subtle purple tones, and they can vary slightly in shape and size among individuals. The wattles are thought to play a role in social signalling and courtship.s Juveniles have pink or lilac wattles, which become increasingly blue as the bird matures; like the South Island kōkako, adults occasionally have orange wattles. The wattles also play a role in thermoregulation, as they help dissipate body heat on hot days. When the bird is warm, blood flow to the wattles increases, allowing heat to escape. When it is cold, blood flow decreases, helping to preserve body warmth. Furthermore, the wattles can indicate an individual bird's health.

The legs and feet are strong and built for agility among tree branches, and they are bluish-grey to black. Kōkako are not strong fliers; instead, they are highly adapted for climbing and leaping through the forest canopy, using their powerful legs and claws to move through the dense foliage.

The North Island kōkako is a medium-sized bird, measuring about 38 to 40 centimetres (15 to 16 inches) in length, including a long, rounded tail that aids in balance and maneuverability. The tail feathers are dark and broad and are often fanned out slightly when the bird is climbing or displaying.

Sexual dimorphism is minimal, though males tend to be slightly larger.

== Threats and conservation ==
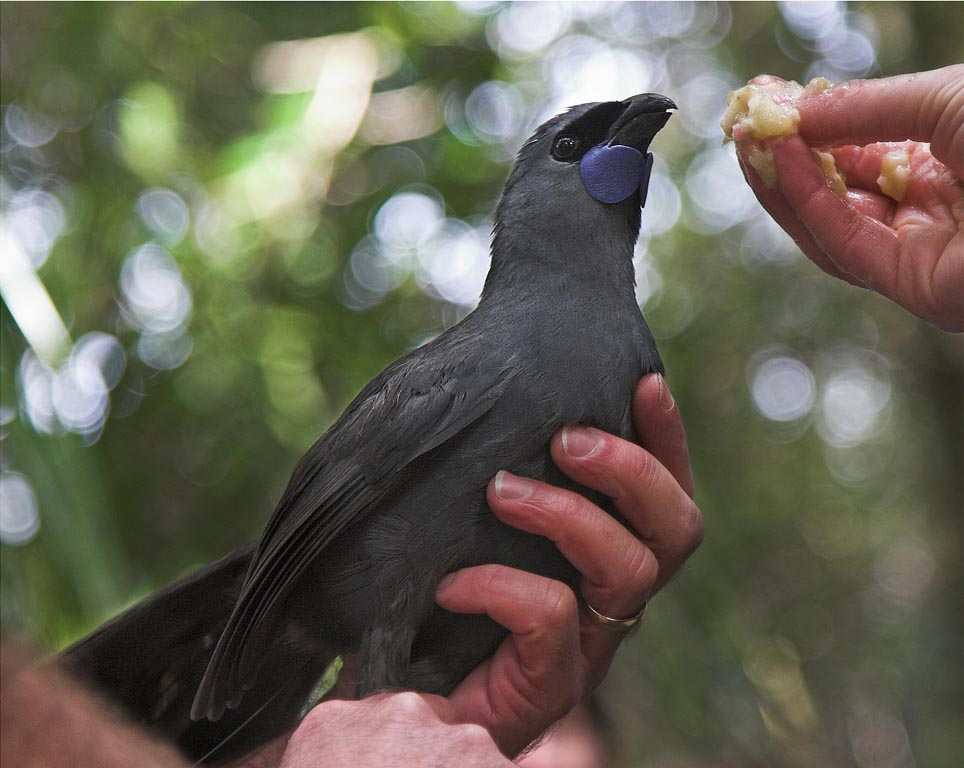
A kōkako about to be released in the Hunua Ranges near Auckland

In the early 1900s, the North Island kōkako was common in forests throughout the North Island and its offshore islands. Its decline was primarily accelerated by settlers clearing forests and the introduction of predators such as rats, stoats, and possums.

Unlike many of New Zealand's most vulnerable birds, kōkako survive in low numbers in several North Island native forests. However, research has shown that female kōkako are at higher risk of predation, as they carry out all incubation and brooding throughout a prolonged (50-day) nesting period. Years of such predation have resulted in populations that are predominantly male, with consequently low productivity rates.

Government-funded pest control and captive breeding programs are critical to maintaining population numbers on the mainland. A "research by management" approach has demonstrated that the kōkako decline can be reversed, and populations maintained in mainland forests by habitat management. Current research aims to increase management efficiency to ensure long-term kōkako survival. The use of biodegradable 1080 poison has been particularly beneficial in reversing population decline by reducing the number of predators. For example, between 1991 and 1999, the breeding population of kōkako increased tenfold in Mapara Wildlife Reserve (Waikato) owing to a series of four aerial 1080 operations. A population of kōkako has also been reestablished at the Otanewainuku Forest in the Bay of Plenty. New populations are also being established through releases on predator-free offshore islands.

With the implementation of such methods, conservationists are hopeful that the species will endure. The IUCN no longer considers the kōkako threatened as of 2022, and now designates the species as one of Least Concern. However, as its survival is heavily dependent on conservation efforts, New Zealand authorities believe that it could still be at risk.

== Distribution ==
As of 2010, North Island kōkako were present in Pureora Forest Park, Whirinaki Te Pua-a-Tāne Conservation Park, Mapara Wildlife Reserve, the Hunua Ranges, Ngapukeriki, Kaharoa Forest, the Te Urewera National Park, Puketi Forest, the Waitākere Ranges and Waipoua Forest in Northland. Kōkako can be seen easily on a number of publicly accessible offshore island sanctuaries, including Tiritiri Matangi and Kapiti Island, where the regenerating forest is low enough to provide close views.
