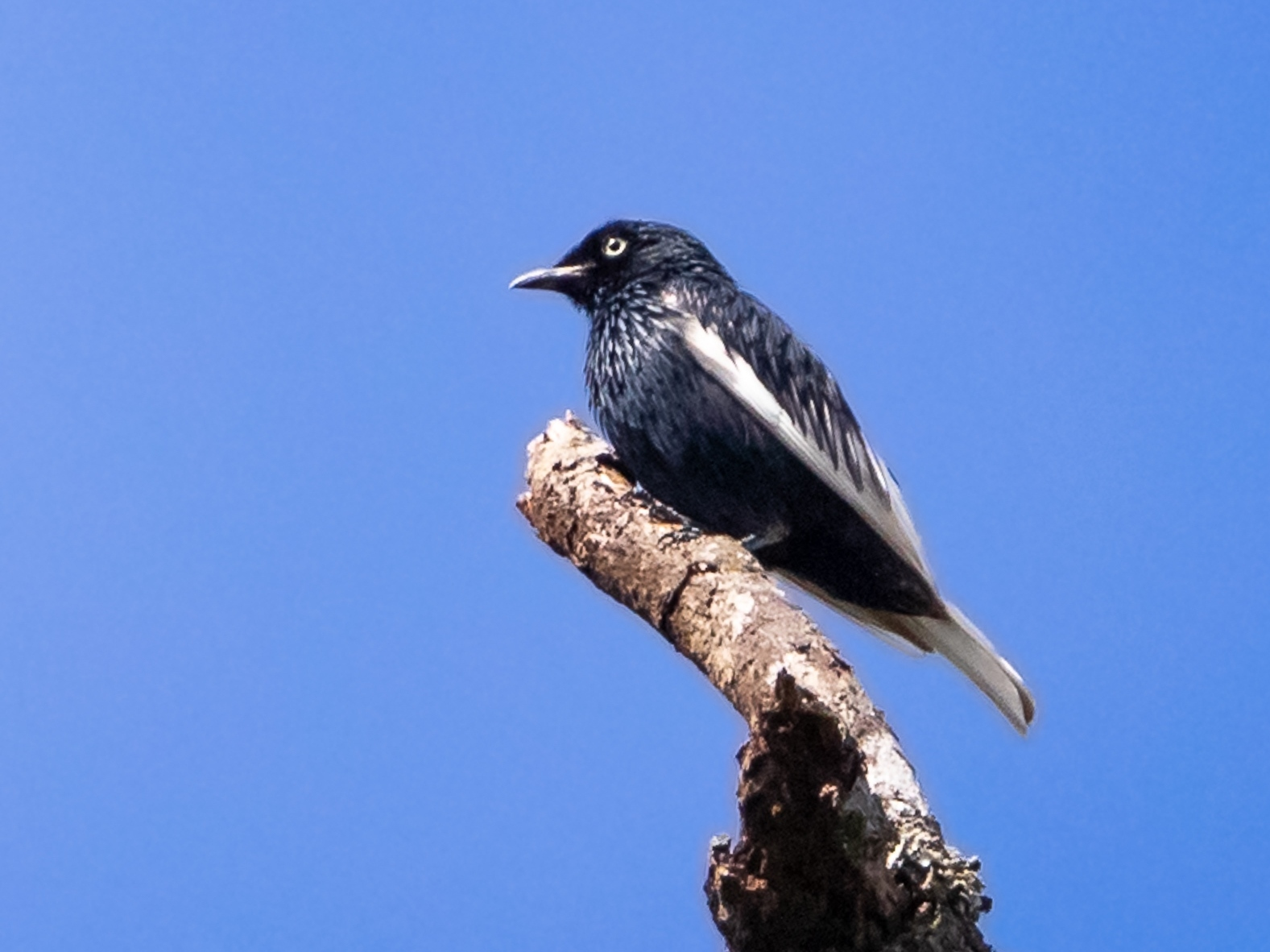
- Male

Conservation status
- Near Threatened (IUCN 3.1)

Scientific classification
- Kingdom: Animalia
- Phylum: Chordata
- Class: Aves
- Order: Passeriformes
- Family: Cotingidae
- Genus: Xipholena
- Species: X. lamellipennis

Binomial name
- Xipholena lamellipennis (Lafresnaye, 1839)

= White-tailed cotinga =

White tailed cotinga

Species of bird

The white tailed cotinga (Xipholena lamellipennis) is a Near Threatened species of bird in the family Cotingidae. It is endemic to Brazil.

== Taxonomy and systematics ==
The white-tailed cotinga shares genus Xipholena with the pompadour cotinga (X. punicea) and white-winged cotinga (X. atropurpurea). The white-tailed and white-winged cotingas are sister species and the three members of Xipholena form a superspecies. The white-tailed cotinga is monotypic.

== Description ==
The white-tailed cotinga is 19 to 20 cm (7.5 to 7.9 in) long. The species is sexually dimorphic. Adult males have a mostly glossy purplish black head and body. Their tail and most wing feathers are white. Adult females have an ash-gray head and upperparts. Their wings and tail are mostly a darker gray with white outer edges on some wing feathers. Their underparts are a paler gray than their back with some darker mottling on the breast. Both sexes have a pale yellow iris and brownish black legs and feet with buff soles. Their dark brownish horn-colored bill has a wide base and a slight hook at the end. Immature males resemble adult females and acquire adult plumage in their second year.

== Distribution and habitat ==
The white-tailed cotinga is found in the lower Amazon Basin of Brazil south of the Amazon River. Its range extends from the lower Tapajós River in eastern Pará and northern Mato Grosso east through northern Tocantins to the Atlantic in northeastern Maranhão. It inhabits the canopy of humid forest at elevations from sea level to 400 m (1,300 ft). The ranges of the three Xipholena cotingas do not overlap.

== Behavior ==
=== Movement ===
The white-tailed cotinga is believed to be a year-round resident.

=== Feeding ===
The white-tailed cotinga is believed to feed mainly on fruits. There is one record of an individual feeding on Phytolacca fruit but nothing else is known about the species' diet or foraging behavior.

=== Breeding ===
The white-tailed cotinga apparently has no fixed breeding season. Males make a display flight from a perch in a treetop. The only known nest was about 5 m (15 ft) above the ground in a rubber tree and held one egg; the nest was not described. Nothing else is known about the species' breeding biology.

=== Vocalization ===
The white-tailed cotinga's calls include a "high wic" and a loud "purp".

== Status ==
The IUCN originally in 1988 assessed the white-tailed cotinga as being of Least Concern but since 2012 as Near Threatened. It has a somewhat restricted range; its estimated population of at least 300,000 mature individuals is believed to be decreasing. "The primary threat to this species is accelerating deforestation in the Amazon basin as land is cleared for cattle ranching, soy production, selective logging and escaped fires, facilitated by expansion of the road network." It is poorly known and "[a]pparently nowhere common; as its congeners, however, it is a treetop bird easily overlooked in areas of unbroken forest".
