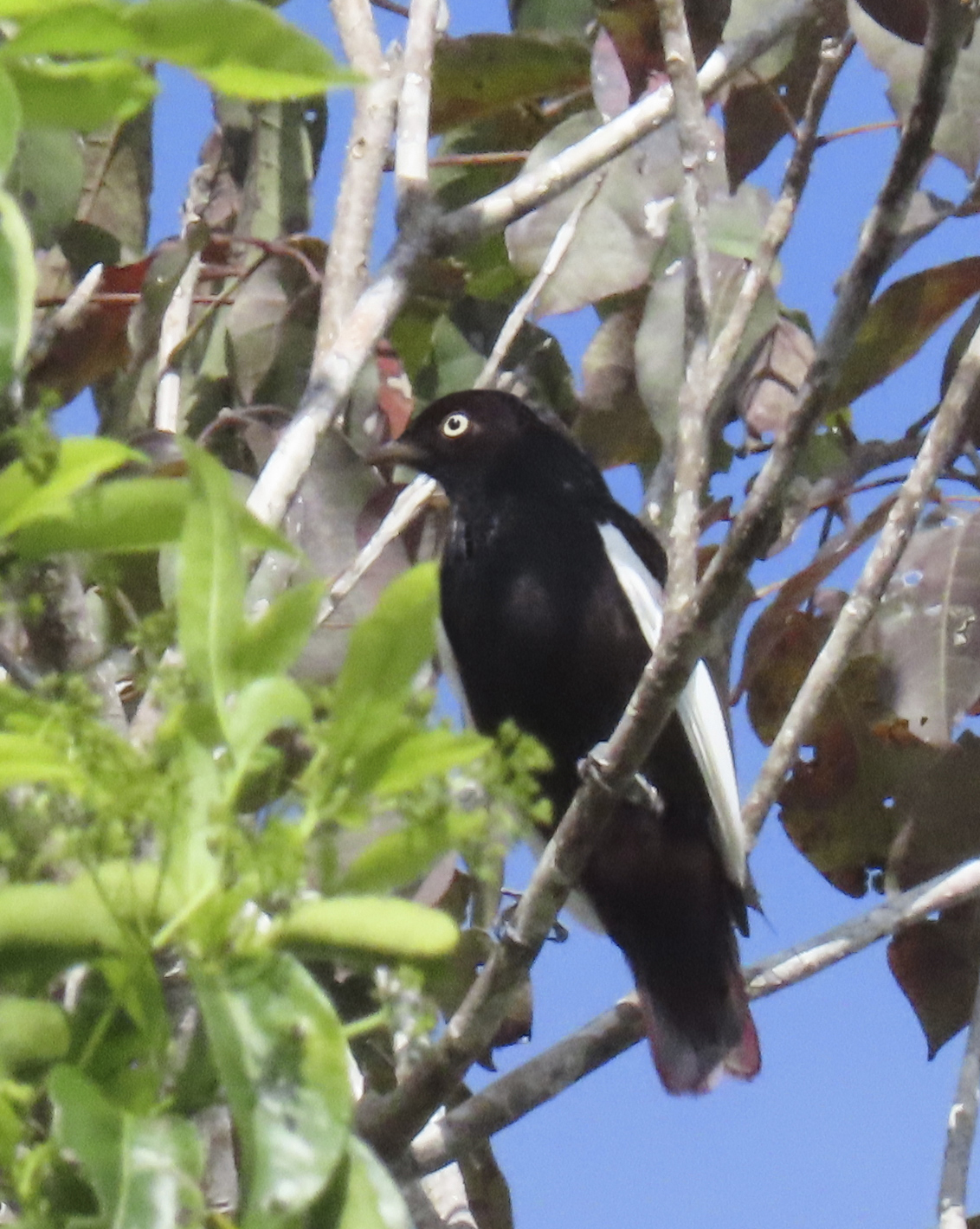
- Male
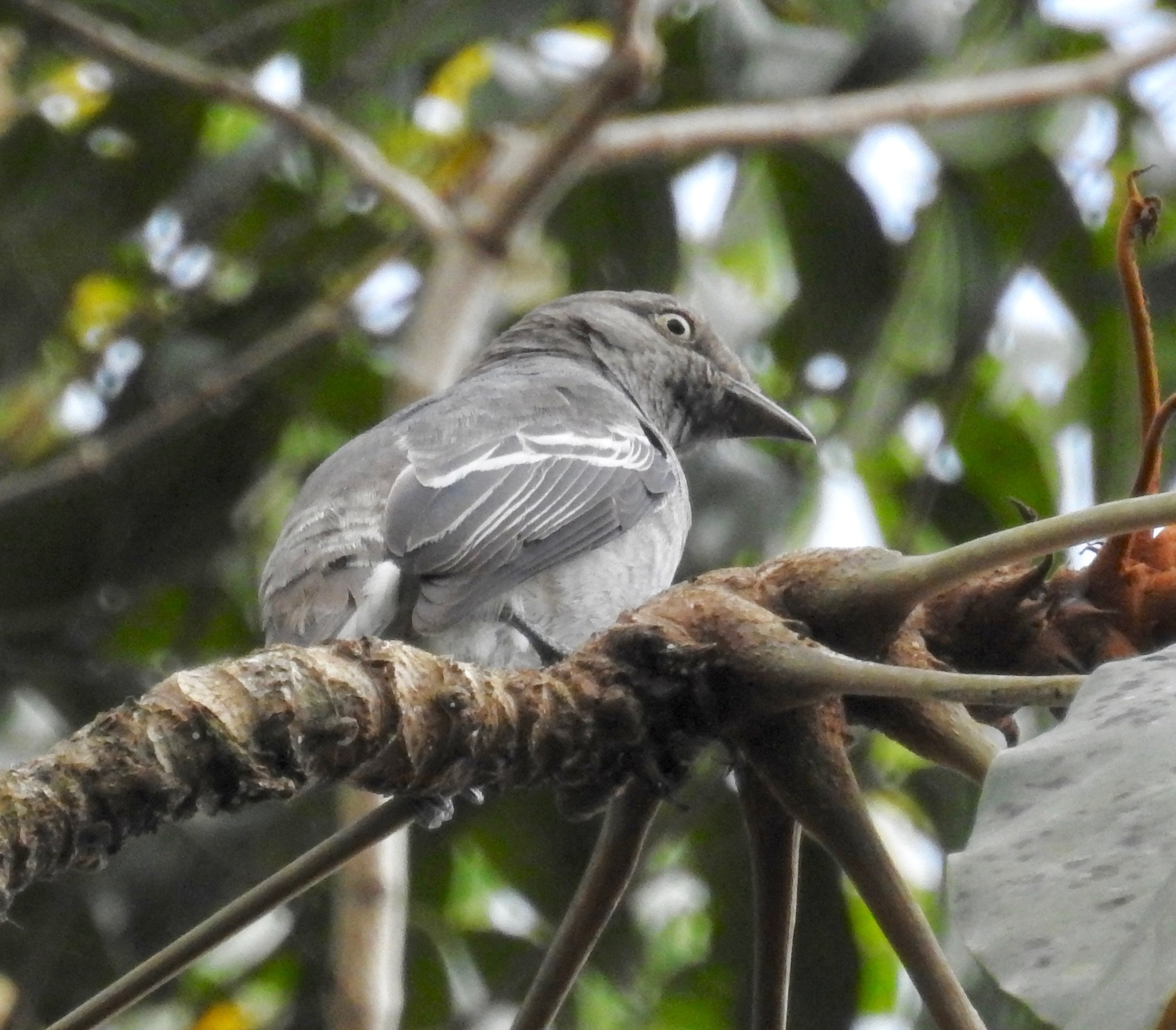
- Female

Conservation status
- Vulnerable (IUCN 3.1)
- CITES Appendix I

Scientific classification
- Kingdom: Animalia
- Phylum: Chordata
- Class: Aves
- Order: Passeriformes
- Family: Cotingidae
- Genus: Xipholena
- Species: X. atropurpurea

Binomial name
- Xipholena atropurpurea (Wied, 1820)

= White-winged cotinga =

Species of bird

The white-winged cotinga (Xipholena atropurpurea) is a Vulnerable species of bird in the family Cotingidae. It is endemic to Brazil.

== Taxonomy and systematics ==
The white-winged cotinga shares genus Xipholena with the pompadour cotinga (X. punicea) and white-tailed cotinga (X. lamellipennis). The white-winged and white-tailed cotingas are sister species and the three members of Xipholena form a superspecies. The white-winged cotinga is monotypic.

== Description ==
The white-winged cotinga is about 19 cm (7.5 in) long and weighs 56 to 67 g (2.0 to 2.4 oz). The species is sexually dimorphic. Adult males have a mostly glossy purplish black head, body, and tail though it is somewhat lighter on the uppertail coverts. Their wing is mostly white with purplish black coverts, some red on the tertials, and black tips on the primaries. Adult females have an ash-gray head and upperparts. Their wings and tail are mostly a darker gray with white outer edges on some wing feathers. Their underparts are a paler gray than their back with some darker mottling on the breast. Both sexes have a pale yellow iris and brownish black legs and feet with buff soles. Their dark brownish horn-colored bill has a wide base and a slight hook at the end. Immature males resemble adult females and acquire adult plumage in their second year.

== Distribution and habitat ==
The white-winged cotinga primarily is found coastally in eastern Brazil from Paraíba south to northern Rio de Janeiro state, with scattered records further south and inland. It primarily inhabits dense humid forest and also occurs in more open woodland, semi-deciduous forest, and scrubby forest on sandy soil. In elevation it ranges from sea level to 900 m (3,000 ft). The ranges of the three Xipholena cotingas do not overlap.

== Behavior ==
=== Movement ===
The white-winged cotinga is believed to be a year-round resident.

=== Feeding ===
The white-winged cotinga feeds mostly on a wide variety of fruit and includes some insects and occasionally flowers in its diet. Its foraging behavior has not been described.

=== Breeding ===
The white-winged cotinga's breeding season appears to span from October to February. Males make a display flight up from a perch followed by a steep descent to the same perch with wings and tail spread. The wings make a loud noise during the descent. Its nest is a small deep cup made from rootlets and some moss placed in a branch fork. One was at least 15 m (50 ft) above the ground and another about 20 m (65 ft). The clutch is believed to be one egg. The incubation period, time to fledging, and details of parental care are not known.

=== Vocal and non-vocal sounds ===
The white-winged cotinga apparently does not sing. Its calls include a "high, barking weh as well as "high-pitched chíu notes" and a loud "purp". In addition to the wing noise during the male's display flight, the wings of both sexes make a whispering sound during regular flight.

== Status ==
The IUCN originally in 1988 assessed the white-winged cotinga as Threatened, then in 1994 as Vulnerable, in 2000 as Endangered, and since 2017 again as Vulnerable. It has a "small and severely fragmented range"; its estimated population of between 2500 and 10,000 mature individuals is believed to be decreasing. "This species is threatened by extensive and continuing deforestation, with nearly 60% of suitable habitat disappearing in the period 1980-1997. Many of the protected areas in which it occurs are still under threat and inadequately protected."
