= Dominance signal =

Type of animal communication

A dominance signal is used in a dominance hierarchy or pecking order to indicate an animal's dominance. Dominance signals are a type of internal environment signal that demonstrate the signalers attributes ^{[2]}. Dominance signals are necessary for several species for mating, maintaining social hierarchies and defending territories Dominance signals also provide information about an animals fitness. Animals have developed conflict management strategies to reduce frequency of aggressive incidents in competitive matters. This evolution is the basis of dominance signals^{[3].}

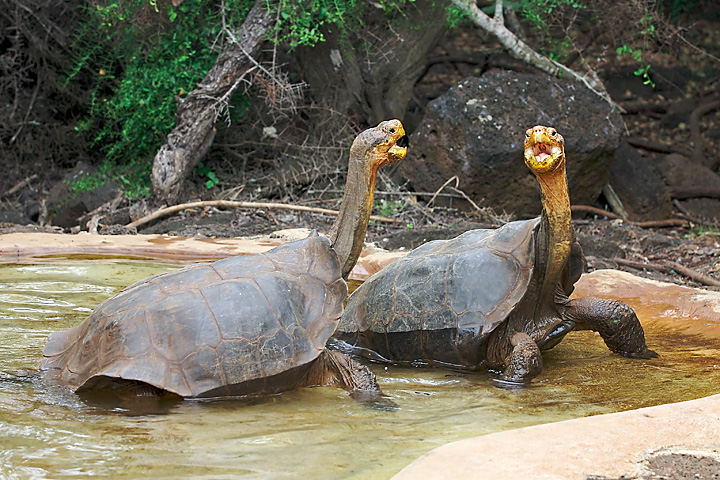
Two Galapagos tortoises engage in a dominance display in an enclosure on Santa Cruz Island.

Dominance signals can be operationally defined by (1) acts or displays produced by signalers, (2) which conveys meaning messages to recipients such that (3) the signal is met with a response and (4) the response results in dominance being displayed. For example, (1) hermit claws raise their claws performing a threat signal, (2) which expresses intent to attack to challenger (3) and the challenger makes a decision to retreat which (4) reinforces signaller's dominance.

The earliest study of animal signals can be attributed to Charles Darwin's "The Expressions of the Emotions in Man and Animals", which introduced the comparative study of signals across all animals^{[1]}. Expressive abilities of the face are the basis of nonverbal expression. These facial signals help maintain dominance or "status" relationships by allowing species to predict the outcome of their encounter, and calculate the cost of their own fitness. Nikolaas Tinbergen furthered the essential framework for studying animal signals with his 'four questions' about the phylogeny, function, development and mechanism of signals or any other behaviour.

Dominance signals are the basis of animal hierarchies and are triggered by stress environments. These signals are used to maintain courtship dominance, social dominance and territorial and resource dominance both within and between different species. Dominance signals are prominent far beyond the ethology literature, as humans express them in several forms.

== Modalities ==
Animals use several modalities of communication to express dominance. Aggressive encounters between competing individuals can result in significant costs for animals. To minimize fighting costs and increase fitness, many species have evolved specialized signalling systems to assert dominance by electing specific cues or signals. These signals allow individuals to gauge the status of conspecifics and not engage in combat with individuals of higher rank or strength. Such signals are found in several species and can present themselves in many different ways.

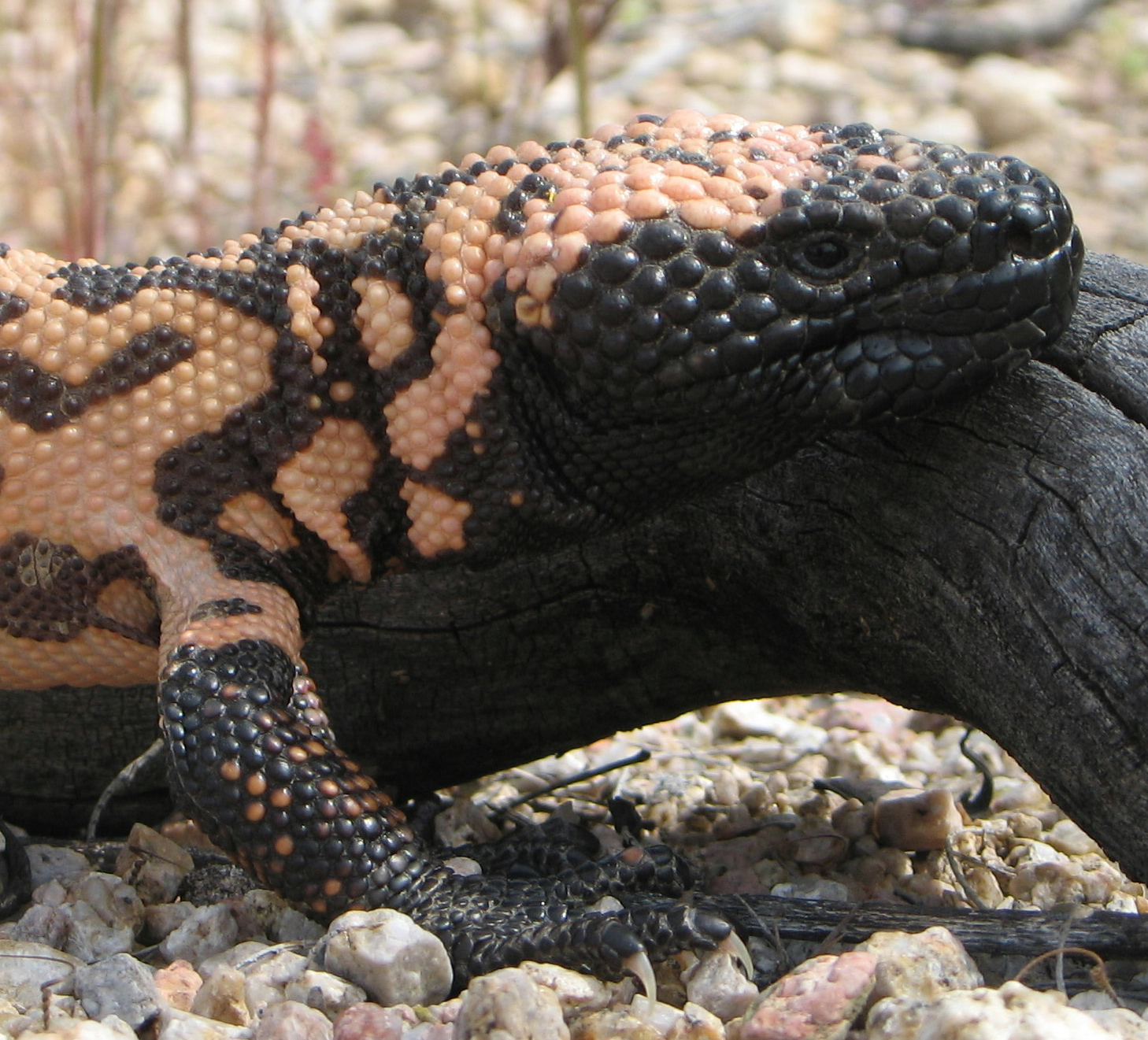
Gila Monster display orange spots

=== Visual dominance signals ===
Visual communication is a common dominance signal among animals. They are an effective modality as they come at a low cost to the animal and minimize risk. The Gila Monster (Heloderma suspectum) for example, express bright orange splotches during territorial conflict to warn competitors that they are poisonous, and thus assert their dominance over a territory.

=== Acoustic dominance signals ===
Acoustic communication is often used by animals to express dominance. Acoustic sounds can vary substantially in amplitude, duration, and frequency structure which can influence how the signal is received. Vocalizations can be effective for a species as it may decrease physical interaction, which may decrease injury costs. Northern elephant seals (Mirounga angustirostris), for example, have a polygynous breeding system in which adult males establish dominance hierarchies that facilitates copulation with females. Acoustic signalling is detrimental in resolving competition between males for mates. Elephant seals express unique acoustic signals that allow males to remember the violations of past rivals and recall which seals are dominant.

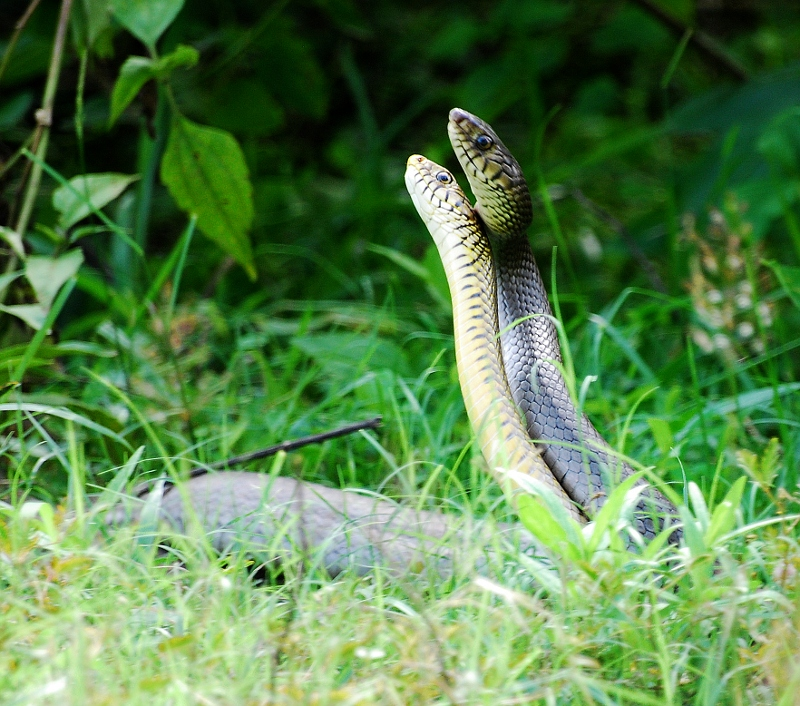
Male snakes during combat dance competing for dominance

=== Tactile dominance signals ===
Tactile signals occur when physical contact is made between two competing animals and can only be transmitted over very short distances. Tactile communication is often very important in building and maintaining relationship among social animals as it can establish hierarchies. Snakes (Serpentes) engage in tactile communication to compete for dominance. This communication is often referred to as a combat ritual. It involves interaction sequences between two male snakes and has been recorded in four groups of snakes including colubrids, elapids, viperines and crotalines. During competition, the male snakes will exert pressures through pushing, flipping or entwining, which will result in one physically subduing the other. The dominant male will then proceed to copulate with the females.

=== Electrical dominance signals ===
Electric signalling is a mode of communication often used by aquatic animals living in murky water. Electric signalling can minimize fighting costs and allow dominance to be exerted in low visibility conditions. In electric fish (Sternarchorhynchus), the frequency of electric organ discharge signals the dominance status of individuals.

== Underlying mechanisms ==
Dominance signals, like other animal behaviours, have internal underlying mechanisms that allow for the external display to occur. Underlying mechanisms may include hormones, sensory organs, cognitive maps, spatial memory, associative learning, brain structure, mental representations and neural morphology.

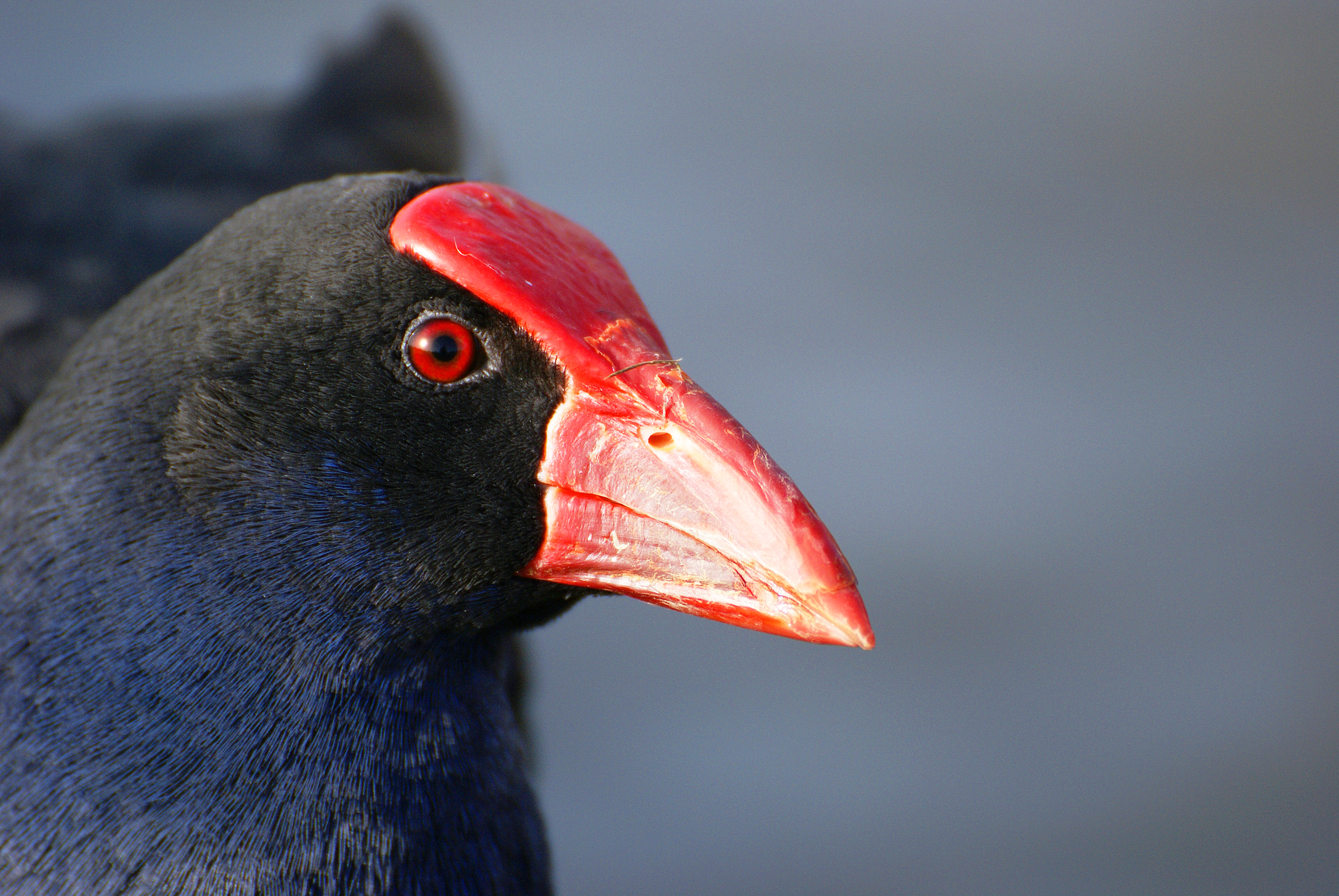
The Australasian swamphen, displaying a red badge, used for asserting social dominance.

Dominance signalling in animals is often a result of hormone changes. Hormones can work in either positive feedback loops or negative feedback loops and can alter the phenotypes of behaviour. In Australasian swamphen (Porphyrio porphyrio melanotus), for example, badge display is an indicator of dominance. It has been found that altering a bird's badge can actually change androgen circulation and can cause feedback effects on the individuals physiology. In a field study by Cody Dey, researchers found that birds which had the apparent size of their frontal shield decreased, received more aggression and also decreased their true shield relative to individuals who did not have their apparent shield size altered.

== Courtship dominance signals ==
Dominance signals used during courtship are driven by interactions between a male's fitness and a female's preference. Dominance signals influence a female's choice of mate because the power of a signal may be a reflection of the male's genetic success.

=== Wild turkeys (Meleagris gallppavo) ===
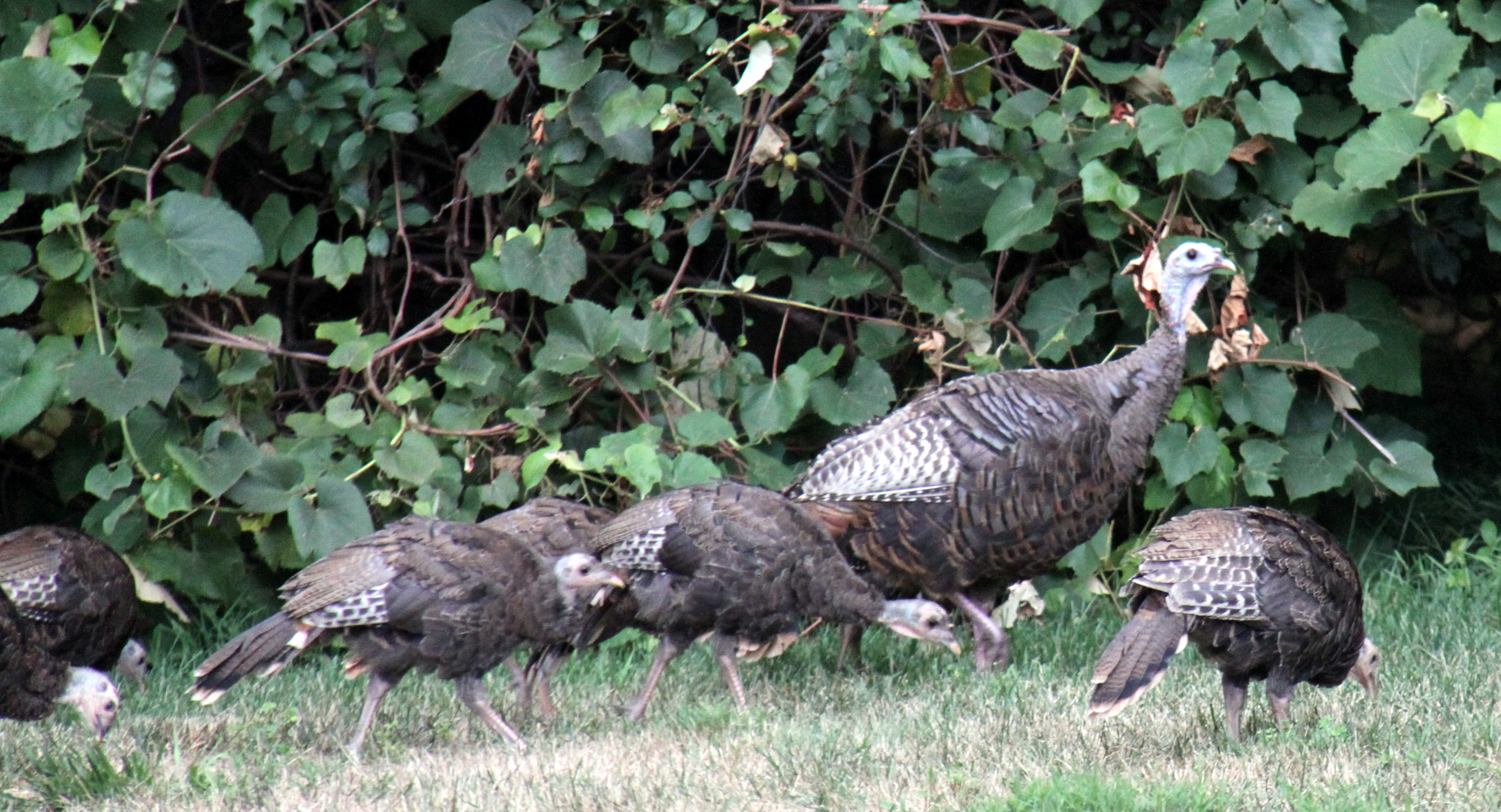
Eastern Wild Turkey's in Social Interaction

Dominance signals are elicited in wild turkeys during courtship. Wild turkeys fundamentally follow a dominant hierarchy as a way to increase their inclusive fitness. The dominant subordinate relationship occurs between two brothers. One brother, the dominant, copulates while the other male, the subordinate, helps.

After birth, the physical appearance of the male turkeys is used to indicate dominance. Physical characters such as height, bulk, and density are evaluated.

=== Gymnotoid electric fish (Eigenmannia virescens) ===
Electric fish express dominance signals during courtship by exerting electric organ discharge "chirps". The "chirps" are an indicator of a male's aggressiveness and size. The more "chirps" a male electric fish produces, increases his likelihood of reproductive success. Continual bouts of chirping can last hours on evenings prior to courting. The electric chirps stimulate females to spawn. The chirp involves a slight increase in frequency followed by a cessation of the male dominant frequency. Chirps are normally short and abrupt during aggressive encounters when courting females, however, become softer during actual copulation.

== Social dominance signals ==
Social dominance is formed through dominance hierarchies. Such hierarchies arise when a member of social group elicits a dominance signal to initiate competitive interaction.

=== Gorillas (Gorilla beringei graueri) ===
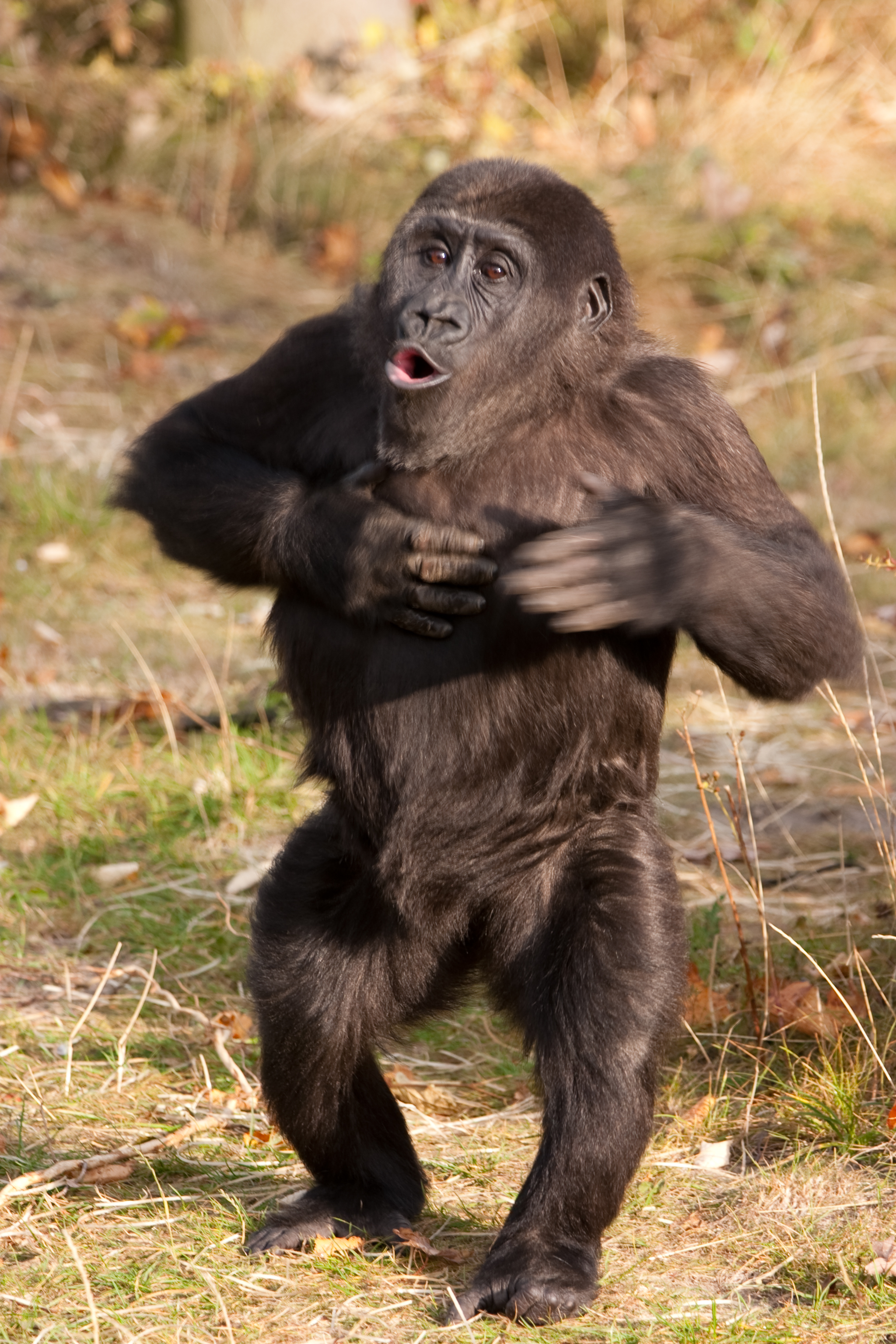
A Young Gorilla chest-drumming.

Gorilla's chest-drumming is a signal used to demonstrate social dominance. This non-verbal, rapid chest-drumming creates a sound because gorillas have air sacks on both sides of their throat. The drumming is often accompanied by screaming and non-specified sounds. This signal is used as a warning signal to young gorilla to back-down if they are trying to join their tribe. This signal will only cease if the young male backs-down or if they engage in battle. The young males are not challenging the dominant for courtship behaviour alone, but rather are trying for group-wide control. Chest-drumming is also used a sign of victory after a battle and demonstrates who is the male dominant. As gorillas are male dominant, females do not produce these dominance signals. Silverback gorillas also use chest-drumming to command their family to follow them, reinforcing familial dominance.

Dominance signals that reinforce hierarchy are crucial for survival for animals like gorillas who are extremely aggressive. A Gorilla's chest drumming, for example, reduces intra-species aggression by making the dominant-subordinate relationship clear. For social animals like gorillas, having and maintaining a dominant male is crucial to maintain their way of life.

== Territorial dominance signals ==
Dominance signals are often elicited over competition for territory. Dominance over a territory can be highly beneficial as it would provide abundant recourse. However, the cost of holding a territory can also be quite high. Dominance signals allow signalers to convey the dominant-subordinate relationship to a receiver avoiding physical contact.

=== Atlantic salmon (Salmo salar) ===
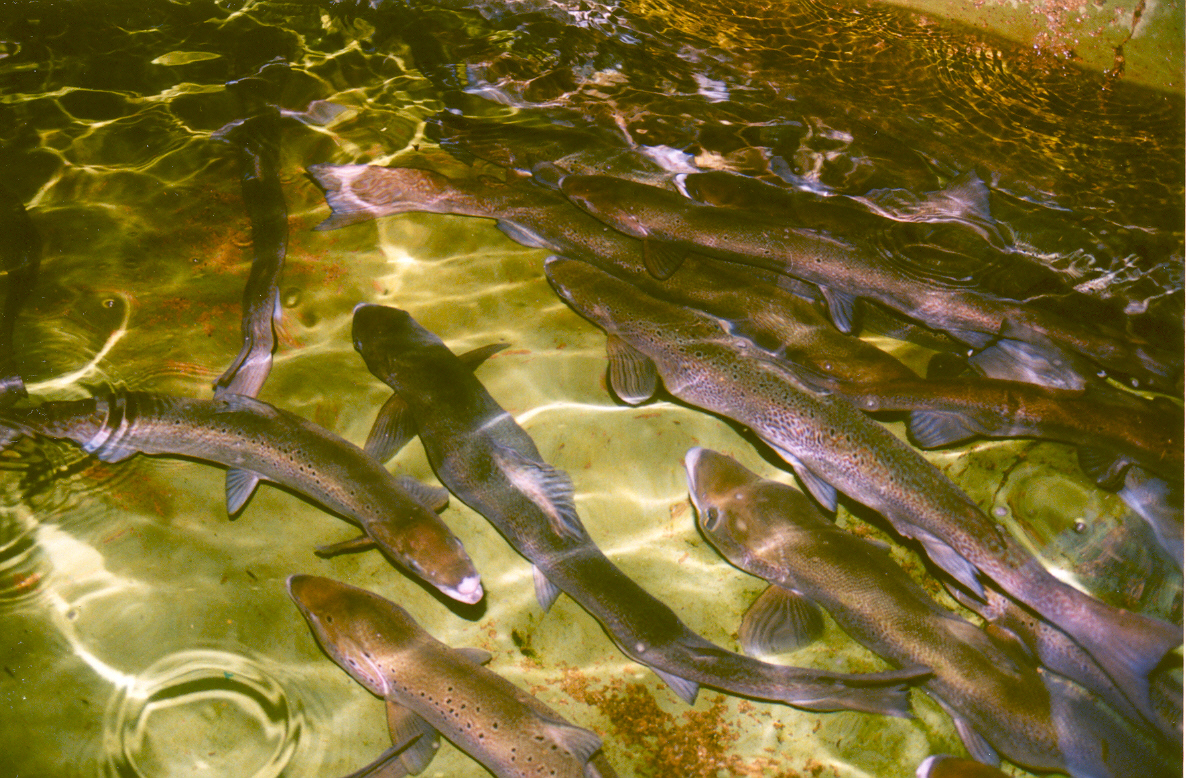
Adult Atlantic Salmon returning to their river to spawn.

Dominance signals used by Atlantic Salmon allow for territory to be defended. When an Atlantic salmon is challenged by another salmon for territory and resources, a physical change in colour display occurs. When a subordinate male enters the territory of a dominant male, it will become darker after assessment of the dominant male, while the dominant male remains his original colour. This change in colour has been recorded in the sclera of the eye and the overall body coloration. The darkening is a sign of submission and is beneficial for both males as it minimizes the risk of potential injury during prolonged fights.

== Human dominance signals ==
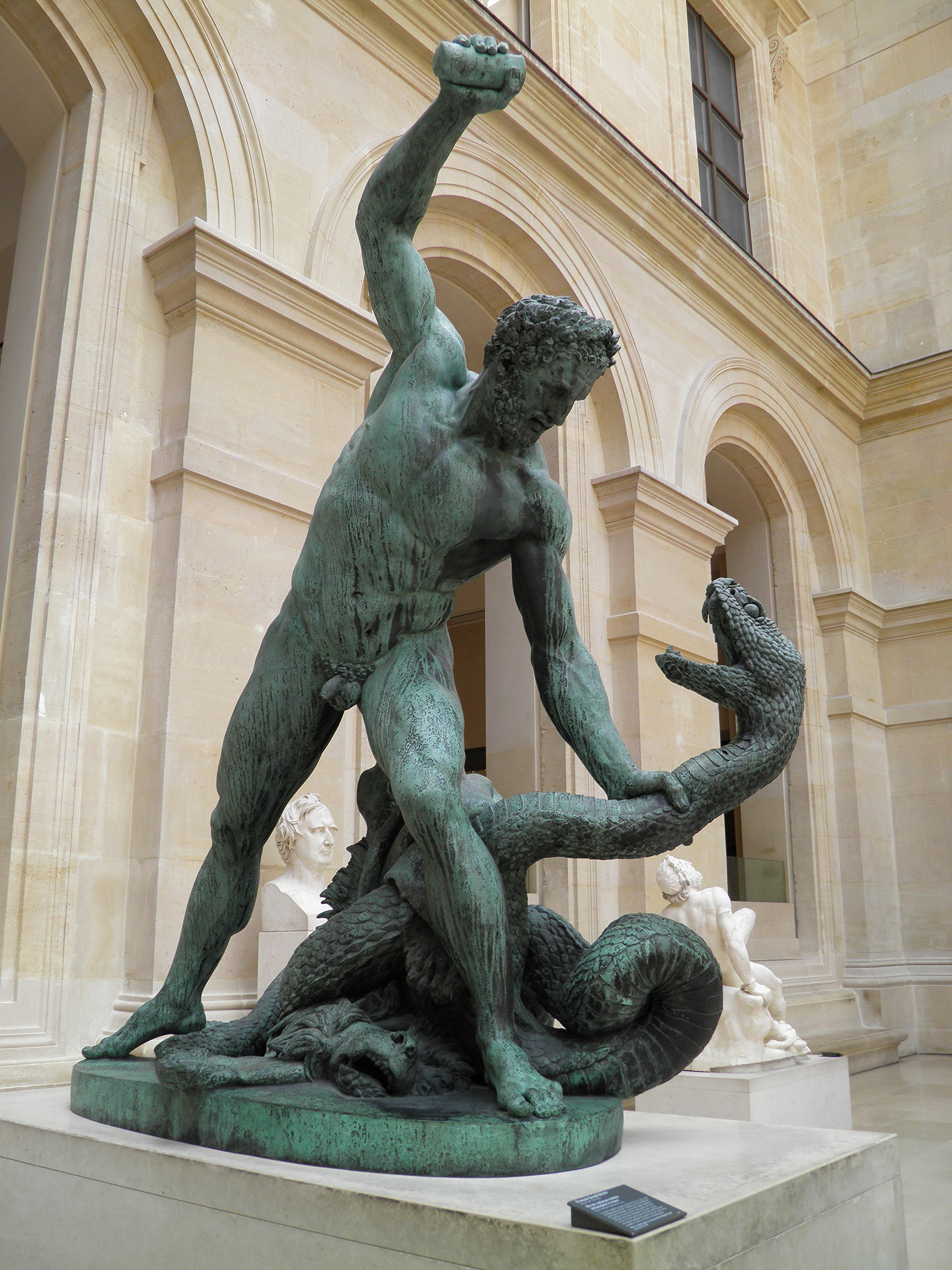
Depiction of divine Greek hero Hercules battling Achelous for the right to marry Deianira

Dominance signals are typically associated with ethology. However, humans display such signals as it is an innate characteristic. Fundamentally, all social species must have expressions of dominance and engage in hierarchy systems to function. Men exhibiting greater dominance signals often have higher success mating with women.

=== Voice ===
Human voice pitch is one of the most prevalent dominance signal and has evolutionary ties to non-human primates. Physically, men's vocal folds and vocal tracts are longer than those of women, which produces a lower fundamental frequency and closer spacing of formant frequencies in men. These differences are not fully clear from an evolutionary perspective; However, it has been suggested that voice pitch is linked to male dominance competition. Current research on male voice pitch suggests that lower pitch is perceived as increasing dominance. Lower pitch voices also tend to be indicators of physical and social dominance. Other vocalization signals include loud rapid speaking tempo and clear articulation. Empirical evidence shows that women perceive deep-voiced men to be more dominant and desirable for mating.

=== Physical size ===
Physical size is one of the most prevalent dominance signals a human can elicit. Height, weight, bulk, and muscularity send signals of strength and can hold power over subordinate males. Other non-verbal signals that are perceived as signs of dominance are rapid gait, straight postures, firm and strong stances, animated gesturing, and clothing or hair styles that create a bulkier appearance. Women generally view men who display great muscularity and strength to be more attractive. When observing the male wrestling competitions of the indigenous Mehinaku tribe of the Amazon rainforest, anthropologist Thomas Gregor noted that males who are "heavily muscled" and "imposingly built" have higher mating access to females, while small men, who are derogatorily referred to as peristsi, "fare badly". He reports that powerful male wrestlers are both frightening to villagers and the most sexually desirable to females.

=== Facial expression ===
Facial expression is used as a dominance signal in humans. Derived from our primate ancestors, faces of mature members have broader faces with a more defined jaw, smaller ratio of eye size to face size and larger noses. Younger members are perceived as having baby-faced features which includes rounder, softer faces, larger eyes when compared to face ratio, and smaller noses. These facial features can be used as dominance signals as baby-faced individuals are perceived as weak and submissive compared to mature faces which can indicate physical and social dominance. In a study where women viewed mixed-martial arts fights, male winners whose faces indicated victory and dominance were perceived to be more attractive, stronger, aggressive, and masculine compared to the male losers.

=== Subtle dominance signals ===
More subtle dominance signals have also been suggested such as head nods, less arm wrap, increasing gestures, and more left leg lean. These subtle differences are associated with perception of dominance among males. Little research has been conducted regarding how or if, women elicit subtle dominance signals to express dominance.
