= Matthew Sacchet =

American neuroscientist

- Education: Stanford University (Ph.D.) Brown University (Sc.B.)
- Known for: Science of meditation
- Scientific career
- Fields: Neuroscience, Contemplative Studies, Psychiatry
- Workplaces: Harvard University (2019-present)

Matthew D. Sacchet is a neuroscientist, Associate Professor of Psychiatry, and Director of the Meditation Research Program at Harvard Medical School and Massachusetts General Hospital ("Mass General"). His research focuses on the science of advanced meditation: states, stages, and endpoints of meditative development and mastery. His research also includes studies of brain structure and function using multimodal neuroimaging, in addition to clinical trials, neuromodulation (neurofeedback and neurostimulation), and computational approaches (e.g., machine learning). He is notable for his work at the intersection of meditation, neuroscience, and mental illness. His work has been cited over 10,000 times and presented more than 170 times at international, national, regional and local venues including Cambridge, Harvard, Oxford, Princeton, Stanford, and Yale Universities, and the United Nations. His work has appeared in major media outlets including 10% Happier, CBC, CBS, Forbes, Men's/Women's Health, NBC, NPR, New Scientist, Scientific American, Time, Vox, and The Wall Street Journal. In 2017 Forbes Magazine selected Sacchet for the "30 Under 30".

== Education ==
Sacchet received a Sc.B. in Contemplative Science from Brown University and a Ph.D. in Neurosciences from Stanford University.

== Academia ==
=== Career ===
Sacchet has held research positions at Brown University, Harvard University, McLean Hospital, Massachusetts General Hospital, Massachusetts Institute of Technology, University of Tübingen, and Stanford University. Since 2019, he has been faculty at Harvard Medical School and since 2022 Massachusetts General Hospital where he directs the Meditation Research Program. The Meditation Research Program is affiliated with the Department of Psychiatry and the Athinoula A. Martinos Center for Biomedical Imaging. The Meditation Research Program uses research approaches from affective and cognitive neuroscience, applied phenomenology, clinical psychology and psychiatry, computer science and related computational disciplines, contemplative and religious studies, engineering, epidemiology, neuroimaging and electrophysiology, philosophy, psychometrics and psychological assessment, and psychosomatic medicine. The Program's studies have included multidisciplinary investigation of meditative development and meditative endpoints toward a more comprehensive understanding of the trajectories and outcomes of advanced meditation. The Program has also published landmark research in domains including diverse theoretical aspects of advanced meditation research, and empirically including contributing first studies of advanced absorption ("jhana") and insight meditation, meditative endpoints (including cessations of consciousness), and the epidemiology and public health implications of altered states of consciousness. The goal of the Meditation Research Program is to establish a scientific understanding of, and also to share, advanced meditation as well as to "contribute to improving individual well-being and the collective health of society by informing the development of meditation training and meditation-based interventions that are more effective, efficient, and targeted."

=== Work ===
Sacchet's work has influenced several areas, including the science of meditation, brain connectivity in depression, machine learning and person-specific biomarkers for depression, and depression and the brain across the lifespan.
