= Lakenheath railway station =

Railway station in Suffolk, England

Coordinates: 52.448°N 0.534°E

Lakenheath
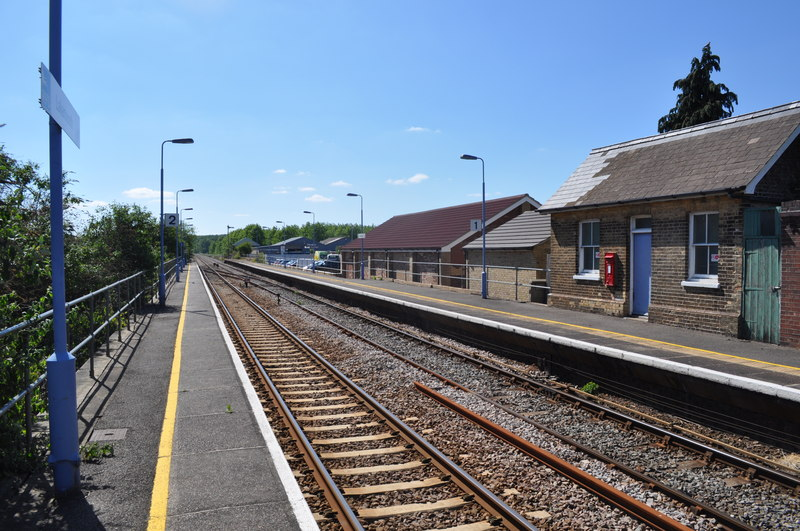

General information
- Location: Lakenheath, West Suffolk; England
- Grid reference: TL723863
- Manager: Greater Anglia
- Platforms: 2

Other information
- Station code: LAK
- Classification: DfT category F2

Passengers
- 2021/22: ▲476
- 2022/23: ▲562
- 2023/24: ▼480
- 2024/25: ▲920
- 2025/26: ▲1,046
Location
Notes
- Passenger statistics from the Office of Rail and Road

Lakenheath railway station is on the Breckland Line in the east of England, serving the village of Lakenheath, Suffolk. The line runs between Cambridge in the west and Norwich in the east.

Lakenheath is 82 miles 39 chains (132.8 km) from London Liverpool Street via Ely.

== Location ==
The station lies some three miles north of the village and is not within convenient walking distance of any sizeable population. However, there is a population of over 10,000 people (in Lakenheath as well as Feltwell and Hockwold cum Wilton) within a five-mile radius of the station.

== Passenger volume ==
Lakenheath registered just 476 passenger entries/exits in 2021/22, according to Office of Rail and Road estimates. The limited services that call at the station, at weekends only, provide access to the RSPB Lakenheath Fen nature reserve immediately adjacent to the station. The station is the least used railway station in Suffolk.

== Services ==
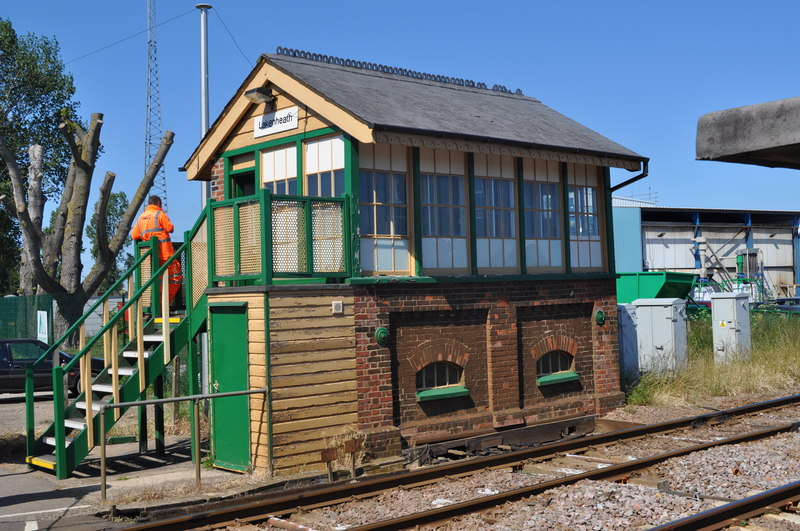
The former signal box, closed in June 2012

As of February 2023, on Saturdays there is one train to Stansted Airport departing at 11:13 and one train to Norwich departing at 15:50, and on Sundays there are three trains to Stansted Airport and four to Norwich. There is no weekday service.

Preceding station	National Rail	Following station
Shippea Hill	Greater Anglia Breckland Line Weekends only	Brandon
