= Cranes of Great Britain =

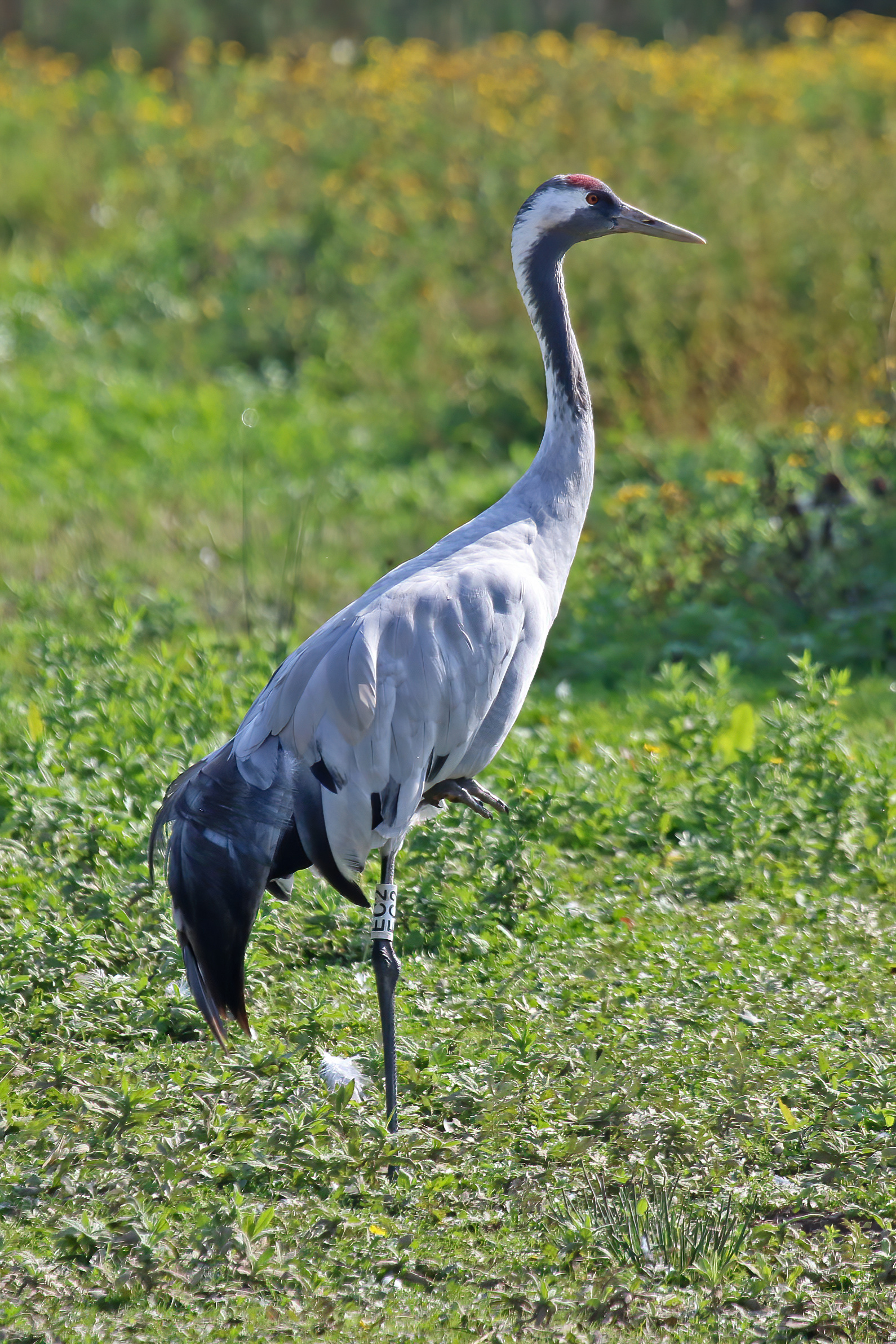
A common crane photographed in Slimbridge

Cranes are large, long-legged and long-necked birds of the order Gruiformes. Two species occur as wild birds in Great Britain: the common crane (Grus grus), a scarce migrant and very localised breeding resident currently being reintroduced to the country, and the sandhill crane (Antigone canadensis), an extreme vagrant from North America. A third species, the demoiselle crane (Grus virgo), has been recorded on a number of occasions, but these birds have not generally been accepted as being of wild origin.

A number of other species are kept in captivity, resulting in the possibility of escapees being seen.

== Common crane ==
=== Historical occurrence ===
The common crane (Grus grus) is generally believed to have been a breeding bird in Britain in the Middle Ages. English people prized cranes as the "noblest quarry" for a falconer, and gladly ate them. In December 1212 King John flew his gyrfalcons at cranes at Ashwell, in Cambridgeshire, and killed seven, and on another occasion in Lincolnshire in February 1213 he brought down nine. A banquet to celebrate George Neville's enthronement as Archbishop of York in 1465 supposedly included 204 cranes. An Act of Parliament of 1533 included a measure that made the taking of cranes' eggs an offence, punishable by a fine, and there are five mentions in the "Household book of the L'Estrange family" of the supply of cranes for their larder between 1519 and 1533.

Confusion arises about the identity of these birds as the grey heron was, and still is, known as "crane" in many parts of rural England.

English place names with the prefix "cran" are not infrequent, and derive from the bird, for example the name of Cranfield in Bedfordshire derives from the Anglo-Saxon crane feld - open country frequented by cranes.

=== Migrant status ===
Common crane is a scarce spring and autumn migrant to Britain, with occasional birds remaining in winter or summer.

=== Recolonisation of Norfolk Broads ===
In the late 20th century, common crane recolonised the Norfolk Broads; the species has now established a resident population of some 20 individuals. This population is centred on the northeastern part of the Broads, in the area around Sea Palling, Horsey, and Hickling.

The origins of this population can be traced to 15 September 1979, when two birds appeared near Hickling Broad; these two were joined by a third bird on 10 October. On 7 October, a crane with a rubber object wrapped around its bill was found near the villages of Irstead and Horning. It was taken into care and released on Horsey in March 1980, temporarily bringing the population to four.

==== 1980s ====
By the end of April 1980, only two birds remained; however, these birds stayed throughout 1980 and 1981, and in 1982 raised a single young, the first successful breeding in Britain for around four hundred years. A second young was raised in 1983, but disappeared before the end of the year. An additional bird joined the group on 16 August 1982, and remained with them until at least 1987.

Further breeding attempts were made from 1985 through until the end of the 1980s, those in 1986 and 1988 being successful, with one young each raised. In addition, further migrant birds joined the flock; not all stayed, however both the wintering and summering populations steadily grew, as shown below:

Winter	1979/80	1980/1	1981/2	1982/3	1983/4	1984/5	1985/6	1986/7	1987/8	1988/9
Maximum winter count	4	2	2	4	4	4	5	6	6	9
Summer	1980	1981	1982	1983	1984	1985	1986	1987	1988	1989
Number of pairs attempting to breed										
Number of young raised			1	1	0	0	1	0	1	0

==== 1990s ====
During most of the 1990s, the population remained steady; however with several successful breeding attempts in the late 1990s, the population began to climb into double figures. Data on the 1990s' populations and breeding activity are as follows:

Winter	1989/90	1990/1	1991/2	1992/3	1993/4	1994/5	1995/6	1996/7	1997/8	1998/9
Maximum winter count	8	6	6	8	9	6	16	12	10	11
Summer	1990	1991	1992	1993	1994	1995	1996	1997	1998	1999
Number of pairs attempting to breed					3	3	0	3	4	3
Number of young raised	0	0	0	0	0	0	0	2	1	1

==== 2000s ====
Winter	1999/00	2000/1	2001/2	2002/3	2003/4	2004/5	2005/6	2006/7	2007/8	2008/9
Maximum winter count	13	11	16	15	20	24	34	35		
Summer	2000	2001	2002	2003	2004	2005	2006 (Note: 2006 was the first year a pair successfully bred outside of the Norfolk Broads, raising one chick.)	2007 (Note: Eight breeding pairs in Norfolk with one young fledged, one breeding pair in Suffolk, and one breeding pair elsewhere in England.)	2008 (Note: Eight breeding pairs in Norfolk with four young fledged, two breeding pairs in Suffolk, and one breeding pair in Yorkshire with two young fledged.)	2009 (Note: Seven breeding pairs in Norfolk with four young fledged, two pairs bred in Suffolk, one of which had one fledgling, and one breeding pair fledged one young in Yorkshire.)
Number of pairs attempting to breed	0	2	2	2	4	5	6	10	11	10
Number of young raised	0	4	2	3	4	5	1	1	4	6

=== 2000s ===
Aside from in Norfolk above, there were pairs at two localities in Yorkshire in 2002, one of which was observed displaying.

A pair nested in 2007 at Lakenheath Fen in Suffolk. A second pair was also present, but did not breed.

A pair bred successfully on the Humberhead Levels in 2008 and 2009, rearing one chick each time. Two young hatched in each year but one from each brood was predated, probably by foxes. A pair bred and reared one young in the Nene Washes in 2010. (RSPB)

The British Trust for Ornithology estimated in 2017 that the UK breeding population of cranes is 10 pairs. 52 cranes were identified in the UK in winter, and 37 cranes were recorded as passage migrants. The European population of cranes in summer was estimated to be 50 to 70 thousand pairs.

From 2016 to 2021 there has been a significant increase in the UK population, with over a hundred chicks born. 2020 was a record year with 64 pairs, of which 56 attempted to breed, and 23 young were fledged. In the autumn of 2020 there were 78 cranes seen roosting in the Nene Washes: the highest count in Britain, since a flock of about 100 birds on migration were seen passing by in Sussex in October 1963. About half of the cranes in Britain derive from naturally arriving migrants, the other half were re-introduced (see below).

==== Scotland ====
The common crane's presence in Scotland in the Iron Age and Medieval periods has been confirmed by archaeological evidence but after these periods they were extremely rare. Numbers increased during the late 20th century and common cranes were confirmed to breed in North East Scotland in 2012, the breeding population increased to five pairs by 2020. The Scottish breeders prefer lowland raised bogs set in areas of mixed farmland. The Scottish birds are thought to have originated from expanding continental populations independently of the recolonisation of eastern England.

==== Great Crane Project ====
In 2009, the Wildfowl and Wetlands Trust, the RSPB and the Pensthorpe Conservation Trust, with funding from Viridor Credits, began a partnership project to re-establish a breeding population of cranes at a new wetland site. A rearing facility or "crane school" was set up at WWT Slimbridge; this consists of a 1-acre (4,000 m^{2}) marsh garden designed to rear crane chicks between 2010 and 2014 in as close to a wild environment as possible. A pre-release enclosure was also constructed on the Somerset Levels. Although the cranes are hand-reared, all humans having contact with the birds wear special grey cover-all smocks, complete with hoods, and feed the cranes using plaster cast crane heads mounted onto litter picker handles. Approximately 20 cranes are reared and released each year. The first cranes were released in 2010 with annual releases planned up until 2014. The cranes are released in Somerset, on the Somerset Levels and Moors, where the project is also working with farmers and landowners to create suitable breeding areas for the birds. A pair of cranes from the project laid the first egg in 2013.

== Sandhill crane ==
The Sandhill crane (Antigone canadensis) is native to North America and Siberia, and a very rare vagrant in Britain, having been recorded just four times, twice in Shetland:

- a first-summer on Fair Isle on 26 & 27 April 1980
- a first-summer bird at Exnaboe from 17 to 27 September 1991 (this bird was subsequently seen in the Netherlands)
- a bird in Orkney in 2009
- an adult was first spotted in Aberdeenshire on 22 September 2011. It then moved south through Northumberland, Cleveland, North Yorkshire and Lincolnshire before settling again in Suffolk on 2 October 2011.

Elsewhere in Europe, there are records of sandhill crane from Galley Head, County Cork, Ireland in September 1905, and from the Faroe Islands on 14 October 1980.

== Demoiselle crane ==
Demoiselle crane (Grus virgo) has been recorded a number of times – in Cumbria, Dorset, Hampshire, Kent, Lanarkshire, Lancashire, Lothian, Norfolk, Orkney, the Western Isles and Yorkshire. The origin of these birds is not known, and they have not been accepted onto the British List.
