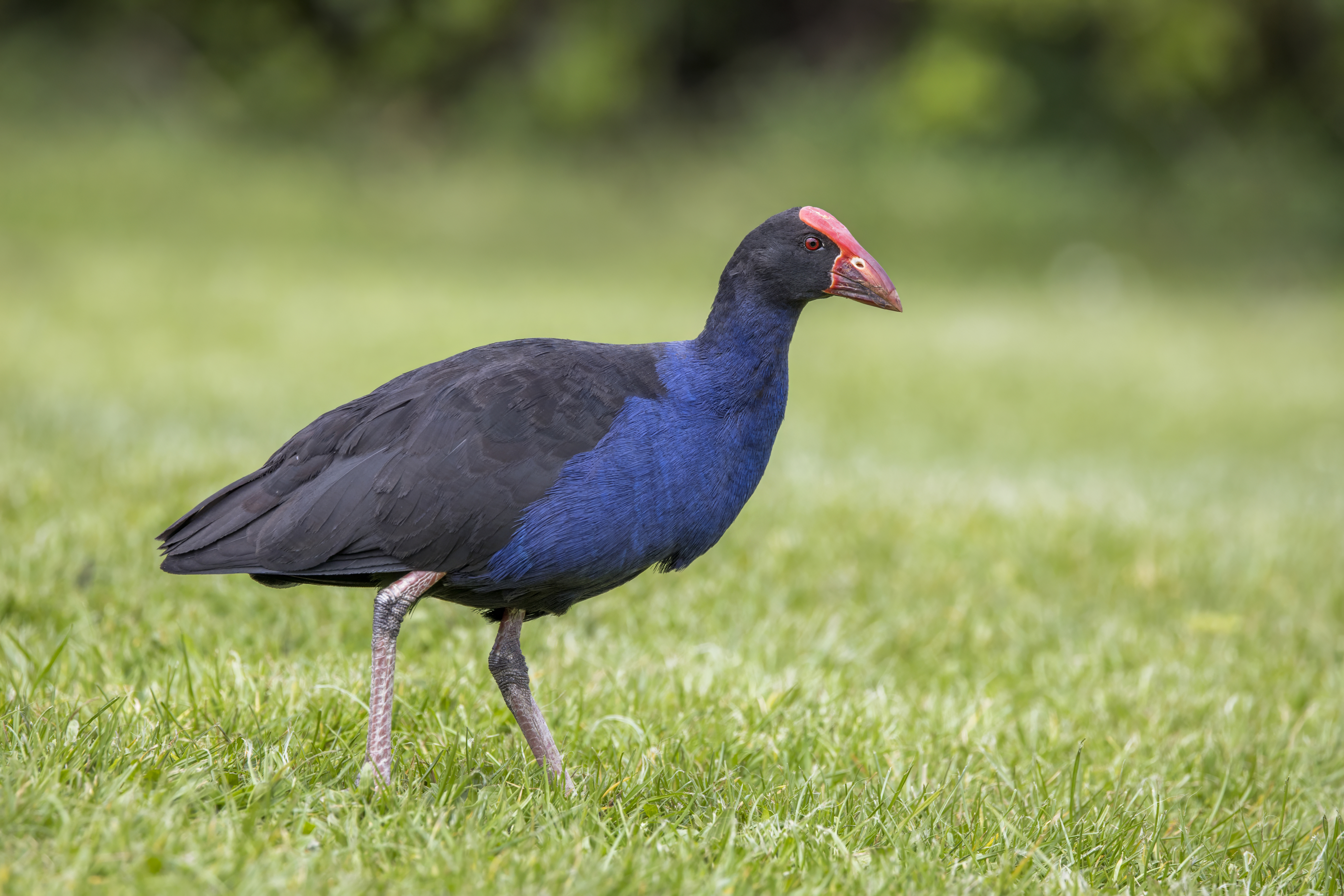
- Australasian swamphen on Tiritiri Matangi Island, New Zealand

Conservation status
- Least Concern (IUCN 2.3)

Scientific classification
- Kingdom: Animalia
- Phylum: Chordata
- Class: Aves
- Order: Gruiformes
- Family: Rallidae
- Genus: Porphyrio
- Species: P. melanotus

Binomial name
- Porphyrio melanotus Temminck, 1820

Synonyms
- Porphyrio porphyrio melanotus

= Australasian swamphen =

Species of bird

The Australasian swamphen (Porphyrio melanotus), commonly known as the pūkeko in New Zealand, is a swamphen found in Oceania, including eastern Indonesia (the Moluccas, Aru and Kai Islands), Papua New Guinea, New Zealand and Australia. A member of the rail family, it is part of the diverse order Gruiformes, which includes species with similar characteristics such as cranes and other rail species. Within the Australasian swamphen species, five recognised subspecies exist, with P. m. melanotus being the most common and widely distributed in New Zealand. They display phenotypic characteristics typical of rails: relatively short wings and strong, elongated bills, adapted to its semi-aquatic lifestyle in wetlands.

The swamphen is renowned for its distinctive blue-purple plumage, striking red frontal shield, and strong red legs. It is often found in swamps, marshes, and other wet lowland areas, though its habitat has expanded to include pastures, roadside verges, and farmland, due to significant landscape changes in New Zealand over the last 150 years. Unlike many other wetland birds, it is highly opportunistic and adaptable, thriving in both natural and human-modified environments. Its diet reflects this adaptability, consisting primarily of plant material such as grass stems, shoots, and leaves, but also including animal matter like invertebrates and, occasionally, the young of other bird species.

Classified as a communal gallinule, the birds often breed in social groups rather than pairs. These groups typically consist of three to nine individuals, including both males and females, which all contribute to territory defence, nesting, and chick rearing. They exhibit a linear dominance hierarchy within these groups that is reinforced by physical traits, such as the size of the bird's frontal shield, which serves as a signal of social dominance.

== Taxonomy and phylogeny ==
The Australasian swamphen, Porphyrio melanotus, is a communal gallinule and a member of the rail family, Rallidae. The Rallidae family is a diverse group of non-passerine birds (birds that do not belong to the order Passeriformes, which includes perching birds and songbirds) with primarily terrestrial habits, characterised by relatively short wings and strong, often elongated bills. This family has a deep evolutionary history, with its origins dating back to the Eocene epoch, approximately 40 million years ago. The rails belong to the order Gruiformes, which is split into two main suborders: Gruoidea, containing cranes (family Gruidae), and Ralloidea, which is dominated by the rail family. Within the Rallidae family, there are about 40 genera organised into nine tribes.

Recent phylogenetic studies have revealed that Porphyrio porphyrio, the widespread species group to which the Australasian swamphen was once thought to belong, is not monophyletic. This means that the group does not consist of all descendants from a common ancestor, suggesting that several subspecies and subspecies groups, including P. melanotus, may actually represent distinct species-level lineages.

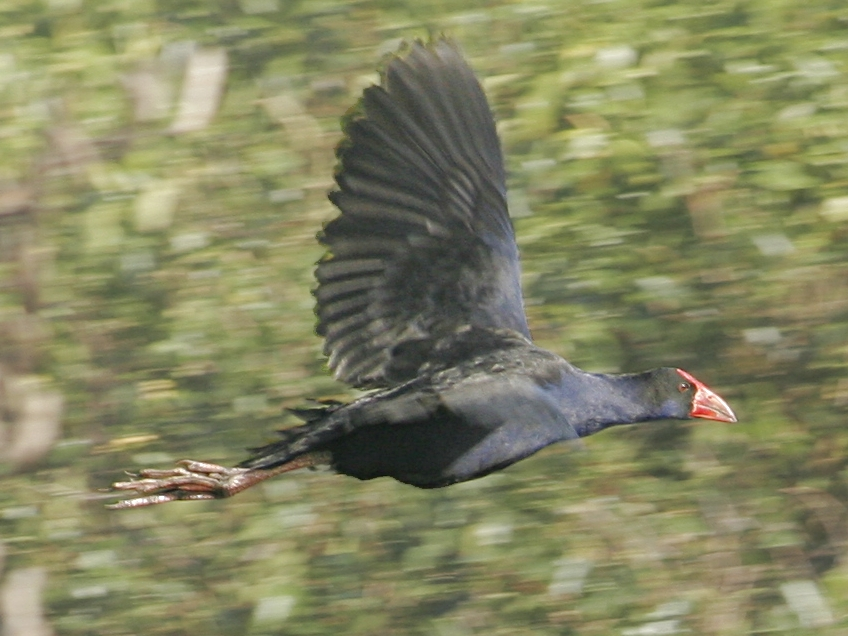
Swamphen in flight. Pauatahanui Wildlife Reserve, Wellington, New Zealand

Studies suggest that the Porphyrio clade originated in Africa during the Middle Miocene, about 10 million years ago (mya), with a single colonisation of the Americas and several dispersals into Southeast Asia and the Indo-Pacific. The oldest split among the currently recognised P. porphyrio lineage likely occurred in the Late Miocene (~6 mya), giving rise to P. porphyrio on the Mediterranean coast of Europe. Porphyrio melanotus is believed to have arrived in Australasia within the past 600,000 years; however, bone deposits suggest a more recent presence on certain remote islands. In New Zealand, for instance, fossil evidence indicates colonisation occurred approximately 500 years ago, following Polynesian settlement.

== Description ==
Australasian swamphen are long-legged birds, standing about 51 cm tall, with dark plumage, black upper-parts, and a contrasting white undertail. They have a large, bright red bill and an expanded frontal shield that extends from their culmen, giving them a distinctive appearance. Their throat and breast are purple, contributing to their striking colour pattern. Variations exist across subspecies, with some having greener or bluer upper-parts or smaller body sizes depending on the region. The New Zealand population (along with green-yellow swamphens in Tasmania) are possibly slightly larger than mainland Australian birds, but are otherwise identical.

== Distribution ==
The Australasian swamphen occurs in mainland Australia, eastern Indonesia, the Moluccas, Aru and Kai Islands, and in Papua New Guinea. It is also found on New Zealand's main islands and in the Chatham and Kermadec Islands.

=== Dispersal ===
Although it is thought that P. porphyrio subspecies rarely use flight, this lineage has effectively dispersed, colonised, and established populations numerous times across extensive bodies of water. In support of the belief that Australasian swamphens are good flyers, and may have self-introduced, a dead bird was found on L'Esperance Rock, a tiny, isolated rock in the Kermadec group of New Zealand, more than 200 km from the nearest established population. This demonstrates the ability of swamphens to fly great distances over the sea.

=== Subspecies ===
The Australasian swamphen has five subspecies distributed as follows:

- P. m. melanopterus – northern and south-eastern Sulawesi, the Moluccas, Lesser Sundas and New Guinea region.
- P. m. pelewensis – Palau (western Caroline Islands, western Micronesia).
- P. m. melanotus – northern and eastern Australia, Tasmania, Lord Howe and Norfolk Islands, as well as the North, South, Stewart, Kermadec and Chatham Islands of New Zealand.
- P. m. bellus – far south-west Australia.
- P. m. samoensis – Admiralty Islands to New Caledonia, Solomon Islands, Fiji and Samoa.

==== In New Zealand ====
The swamphen, now widespread across mainland and offshore New Zealand, is thought to have been self-introduced from Australia about 1,000 years ago. However, Māori from the east coast hold the belief that their ancestors brought the swamphen to New Zealand aboard the vessel Horouta, which arrived from Polynesia approximately twenty-four generations ago. In contrast, west coast tribes connected to the Aotea waka assert that their ancestors introduced the swamphen, along with the kiore and the karaka tree, to the land on the Aotea.

== Habitat ==
The Australasian swamphen primarily inhabits swamps and marshes across Southeast Asia, Australia, and New Zealand. In New Zealand, these birds thrive in wet lowlands and breed in swamps, but they also utilise a variety of habitats such as pastures, crops, farm ponds, road verges, and forest margins. This adaptability has enabled them to exploit feeding opportunities that arose following large-scale lowland clearance and swamp drainage over the past 150 years. Typically found in low-lying wetlands with vegetation like flax, raupo, and rushes, the swamphen is also common in estuaries, salt marshes, and along riverbanks. Their large feet allow them to traverse swampy terrain without sinking, and while not webbed, they provide enough propulsion for swimming. Additionally, they are known for their speed, making them swift runners across their diverse habitats.

== Behaviour ==
=== Feeding and foraging ===
Swamphens exhibit diverse feeding and foraging habits, making use of both plant and animal resources in their diet. Primarily, they consume plant material, including stems, shoots, leaves, and seeds of various grasses, sedges, rushes, and clover. However, they are also opportunistic feeders, supplementing their diet with animal matter, primarily invertebrates. Notably, they have been observed preying on larger vertebrate species, such as pied stilt eggs, Eurasian blackbird chicks, and pāteke and mallard ducklings in New Zealand, as well as common starlings, myna chicks, black swan eggs and cygnets in Australia. This positions them as both a predator and prey species within their ecosystems.

Their foraging habits extend beyond natural environments, often leading them to forage on roadsides, where they seek out invertebrates struck by vehicles and graze on grass shoots from mown verges. In these areas, they also ingest grit, which aids in processing food in their gizzards. Swamphens are bold foragers and have a history of raiding gardens for crops such as kumara and taro, a behaviour that has continued as they adapted to European farmland by feeding on grain and vegetable crops. Their foraging activities can sometimes result in the uprooting of vegetation, including tree seedlings and crops, which has led to the Australasian swamphen being culled under permit in certain areas.

Though considered native to New Zealand as a self-introduced species, swamphen are unique in their dual role as both predators of young birds and crop foragers, a behaviour that occasionally places them in conflict with agricultural interests.

=== Breeding ===
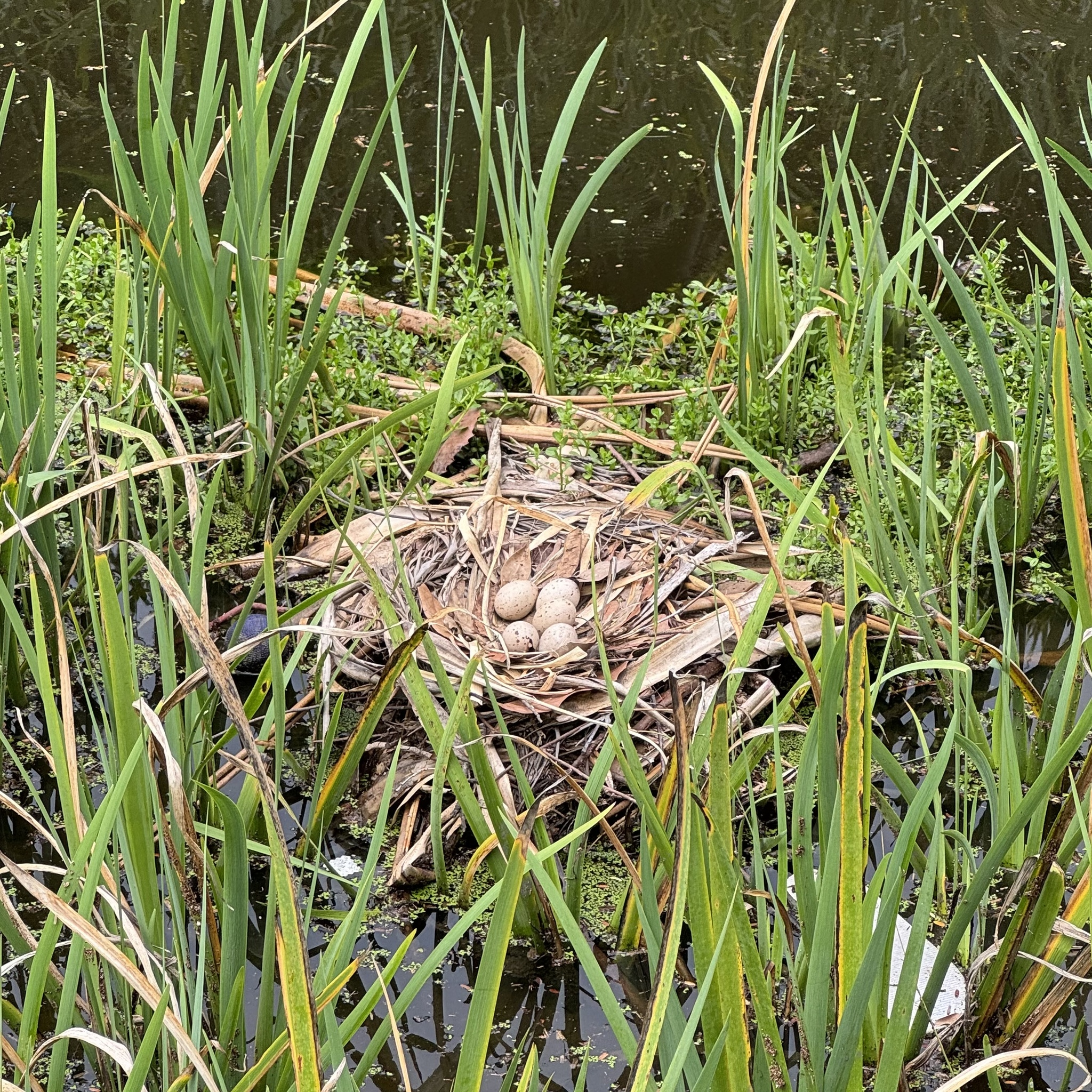
Nest with eggs, in Brisbane

Swamphens exhibit a complex polygynandrous mating system, where both sexes mate with multiple partners, and groups typically consist of three to seven breeding males and one or two breeding females. These females lay their eggs in a single nest, resulting in joint laying—a rare avian breeding system where multiple females contribute eggs to the same clutch and provide collective parental care. Each female's eggs differ in colour and size, allowing for individual recognition within the shared nest.

However, joint laying does come with reproductive costs. Studies have shown that when total clutch sizes are large due to multiple females contributing to the same clutch, a lower percentage of eggs hatch.

The communal nature of breeding also extends to non-breeding females within the group. Although these females are of reproductive age, they do not breed, nor do they face aggression from dominant breeding females or engage in sexual behaviour with males. This hierarchy within the group also influences male behaviour, with males generally not guarding their mates or interrupting copulations with rival males.

Group participation in copulation and same-sex sexual behaviour is also common and is thought to help synchronise sexual cycles, enabling multiple females to lay in the same nest simultaneously. This behaviour, seen between late July and early December, fosters cooperation in the group and enhances breeding success.

The swamphens build multiple nests, with males being responsible for constructing 'trial' nests about a month before laying. Ultimately, one nest is chosen for laying, although occasionally two nests are used. In New Zealand they nest, typically well hidden in the middle of a clump of raupō, between August (end of winter) and March (start of autumn). Most eggs are laid between August and February with breeding reaching a peak in spring between September and December. The recent development of a useful PCR-based genetic marker to determine the sex of Australasian swamphen has revealed that there is no evidence of sex ratio bias in hatching-order. Patterns of growth, survivorship and adult dominance in this species is therefore thought to be attributed to hatching order rather than offspring sex.

==== Courtship behaviour ====
Courtship behaviour includes allopreening, courtship feeding, mounting, and copulation, which can occur between all adult members of the territory, though male-female interactions are the most frequent. Courting behaviour, such as preening and feeding, often appear symbolic, with the passing of food, such as small pieces of duckweed, occurring in a head-bow posture, typically from male to female but sometimes reversed. Courtship usually involves a humming call given by males before mounting.

=== Parental care ===
Swamphens exhibit specific behaviours during the incubation and rearing of their young. A 1980 study showed that the incubation period for their eggs averages around 25 days, typically lasting between 23 and 27 days for eggs laid after continuous incubation has begun, while earlier-laid eggs may take up to 29 days to hatch. During this period, only adults are responsible for incubation, with females generally taking more shifts than males; the dominant female often assumes the most significant role. Males typically sit on the nest at dusk and are relieved by a female just before dawn. Observations have shown that although all birds in a territory are frequently observed feeding together when the clutch is incomplete, spells of unattended eggs during the later stages of incubation are usually brief, lasting from 2 to 15 minutes.

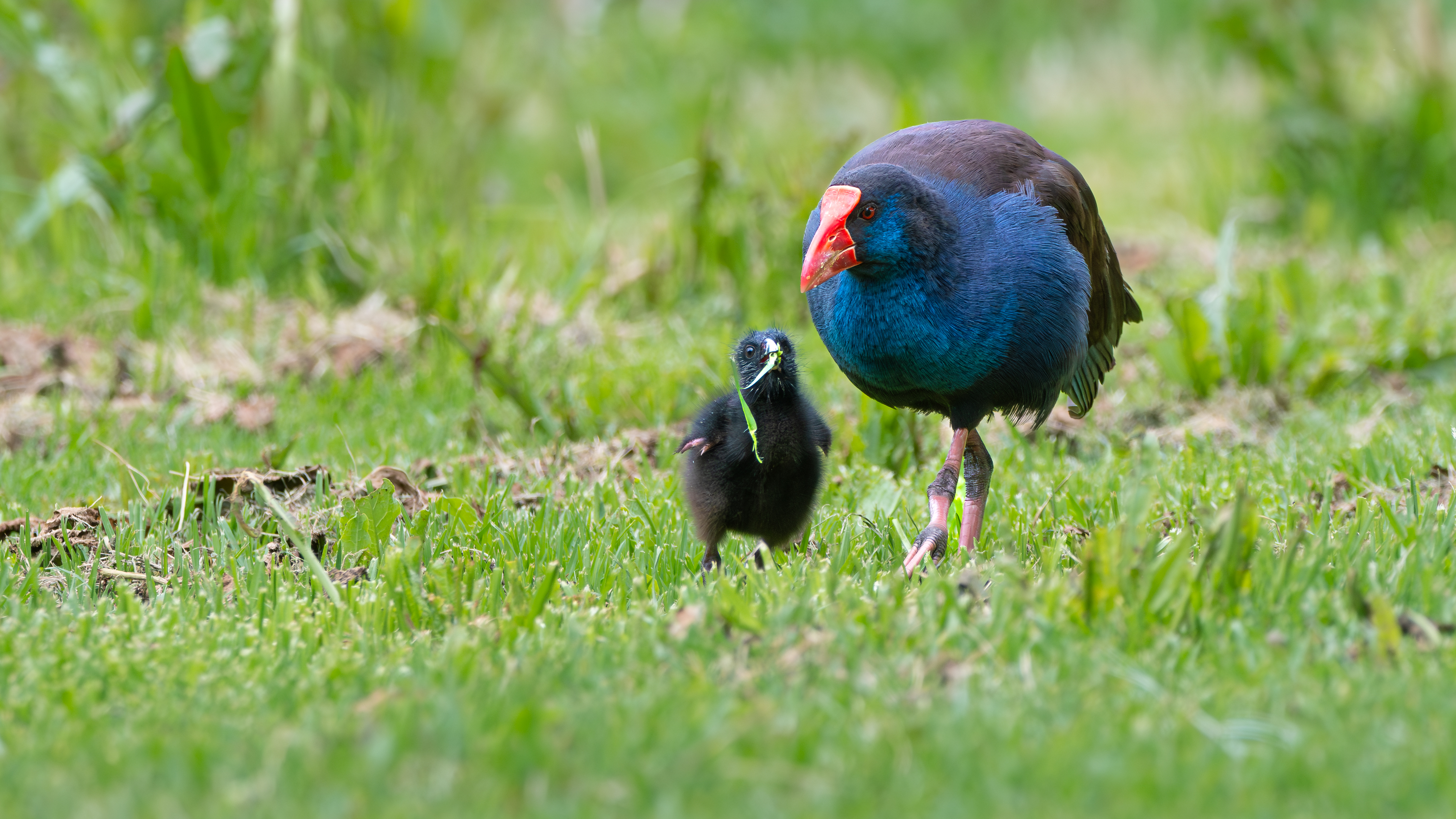
Swamphen feeding grass shoots to its chick, Perth, Australia

Once the eggs hatch, swamphens construct brood nests for the chicks, which are nidifugous, requiring feeding, leading, brooding, and protection from predators. Hatching occurs asynchronously, typically over two to three days, though it can occasionally span up to six days. Chicks begin to self-feed around two days of age but still receive a substantial portion of their food from adults until they are about two months old.

Care of the chicks is unevenly distributed among group members, with everyone, including juveniles from previous broods, playing a part. One study found that in the absence of non-breeding subordinate yearlings, the dominant male tends to provide most of the care, followed by the subordinate female. However, when non-breeding yearlings are present, they take on a more significant role in chick care, with yearling males generally providing more assistance than females. Another study claims that all males in a group contribute equally to parental care, probably due to the fact that there is no precise estimate of their share of paternity and they are unable to recognise their own young.

=== Territoriality and dominance ===
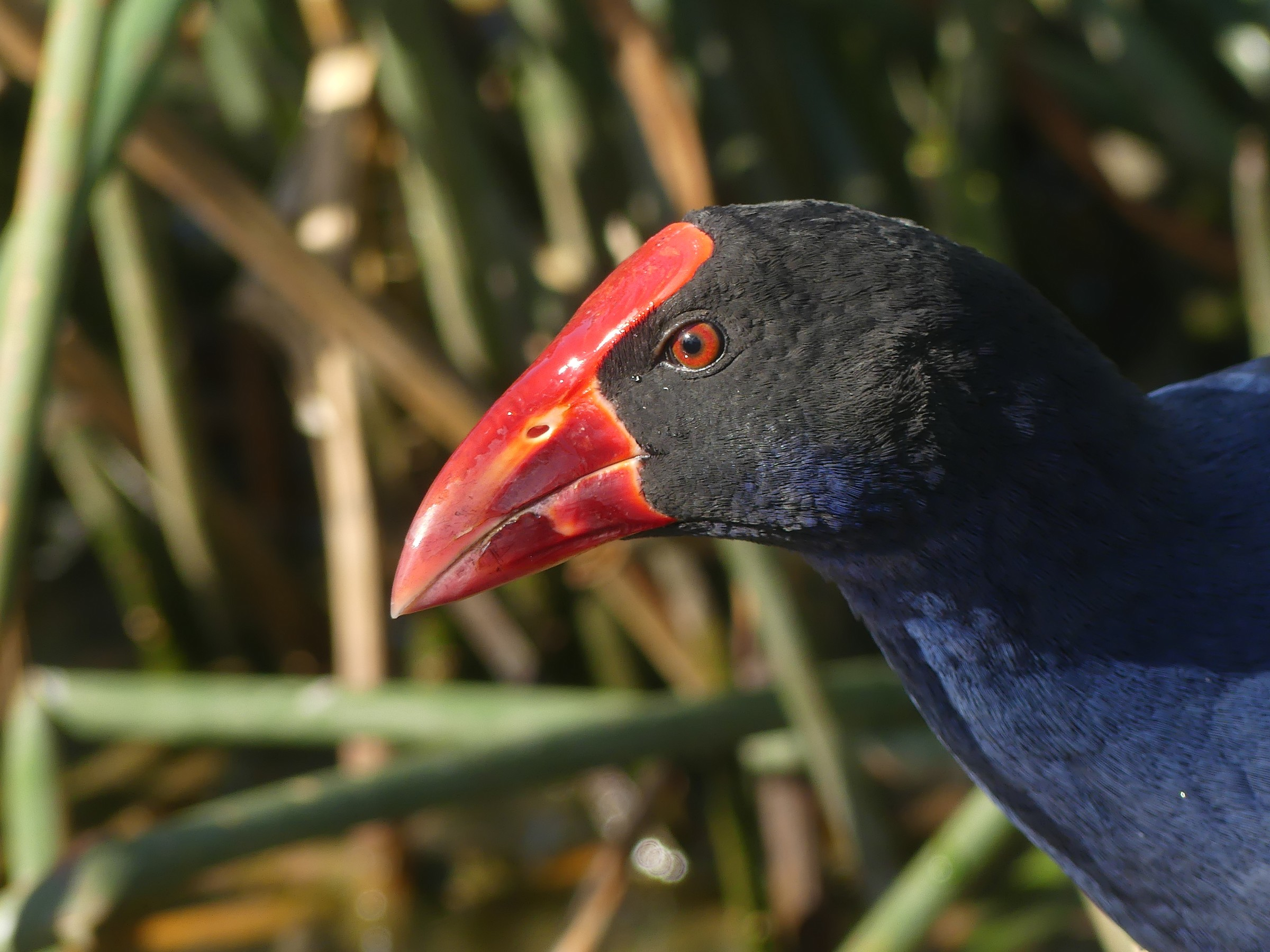
Australasian Swamphen red frontal shield

Australasian swamphens exhibit complex territorial and dominance behaviour, with breeding pairs and groups defending their home range as an all-purpose territory. However, at the boundaries of these territories, defence transitions to a space-related dominance system. All members of a group, including juveniles, actively participate in territory defence, demonstrating a collective effort. Outside of the breeding season, part of the population forms flocks, and within these groups, a linear hierarchy emerges where males dominate females and adults assert dominance over yearlings and juveniles. Dominance hierarchies are well established, influencing the order of female breeders. Interestingly, interactions related to dominance are also affected by the size of the frontal shield ornaments on individuals, which serve as signals of social status; larger shields indicate higher social dominance.

When threatened by predators such as harriers (Circus approximans), swamphens display protective behaviour by forming compact groups in an alert posture, emitting harsh alarm calls while some individuals may fly up to confront the threat. In these scenarios, adult swamphens screech warnings, prompting chicks to scatter and hide in vegetation. The network structure of dominance relationships within groups is influenced by sexual homophily, indicating that same-sex individuals often compete for breeding positions. Notably, females exhibit intense intrasexual competition for these positions, particularly evident in aggression networks.

Traffic sign in New Zealand cautioning drivers of swamphens

While dominant males do not guard their mates or interrupt the copulations of rivals, they copulate frequently to ensure paternity. Socially dominant individuals enjoy priority access to resources and play different roles in parental care and territory defence compared to their subordinate counterparts.

=== Roadside behaviour ===
Australasian swamphens are often seen on roadsides near wetlands or drainage ditches. Studies show that reasons for this behaviour include food sources such as invertebrates struck by vehicles and grass shoots from the mown verge, as well as grit for digestion in the gizzard. Additionally, the roadside provides a relatively open environment that facilitates social interactions among these birds.

== Cultural significance and relationship with humans ==
=== New Zealand ===
The species, known for its bold and cunning nature, has a complex relationship with humans that has evolved over centuries. In Māori tradition, the swamphen is often featured in mythology. It is said to have originated from the heavens, with the legendary figure Tāwhaki encountering the bird on its descent to Earth, searching for cooler waters due to the heat of the sun.

The colour red was associated with nobility and power by Māori, so the bird was held in high esteem and held as a chiefly pet because of its red beak and legs. Although the Australasian swamphen holds cultural significance, it soon became a problem for Māori communities. The birds frequently raided kumara and taro gardens, leading to frustration among early settlers. As European settlers cleared forests and converted the land into farmland, swamphen flocks shifted to targeting grain and vegetable crops while also foraging for worms and grass grubs in damp pastures. To manage these disruptions, Māori employed various strategies, such as chasing the birds away, setting snares, and building light fences around their gardens. The swamphen's (pūkeko) cleverness is acknowledged in Māori proverbs, with a stubborn person referred to as having "pūkeko ears" (taringa pākura), and an experienced individual likened to a pūkeko (kua pūkekotia).

The bird's striking red bill and shield are often viewed as incongruous; while its behaviour may be objectionable, the colour red signifies high status in many contexts within Māori culture. Various myths further explain the pūkeko's attributes. In one tale, the trickster Māui becomes angered with the pūkeko, singeing its head during his quest for fire. Another myth attributes the bird's behaviour to its parentage, claiming it is the offspring of the unattractive Punga, a figure associated with jealousy and mischief. When the pūkeko was born, Tāwhaki (Punga's brother) claimed it as an adopted son, marking its forehead with his blood as a sign of their relationship.

=== Samoa ===
In Samoa, the bird is called manuali'i (literally, "chiefly bird"). Red was the prized colour of Polynesian aristocracy and while birds with red plumage (such as the red-tailed tropicbird, some Hawaiian honeycreepers like the ʻiʻiwi and maroon shining parrot) were highly prized, the swamphen was unique in deriving its prestige not from plumage but from its reddish face, beak, and legs. In old Samoa only chiefs could keep such birds as pets, and early European sailors noticed tethered and/or caged swamphens treated by Samoan chiefs as tamed pets. Some Samoans also considered the swamphen to be the incarnation of a mischievous, aggressive demon called Vave. There is no tradition of swamphens being taken as sport game or poultry food, except perhaps in time of necessity.

== Hunting and conservation ==
In New Zealand, swamphen are protected as native gamebirds, meaning they may be hunted only under licence (from Fish and Game) during the duck shooting season. Sometimes there is an extended season on the West Coast of the South Island of New Zealand. Due to their foraging habits, they are occasionally culled under permit, even though there is limited understanding of how this practice impacts swamphen populations and the broader ecosystem.

Swamphen are not generally hunted for food and most are not collected after the hunting session. They were sometimes eaten by Māori but were considered poor food, being sinewy and tough. In a written account given over 100 years ago, Māori were described as trapping swamphen (near Lake Taupō). They would choose a suitable place where swamphen were known to feed, and drive a series of stakes into the ground. These stakes were connected by a fine flax string. Hair-like nooses (made from cabbage tree fibre) were then dangled at the appropriate height, from the flax string, to catch swamphen as they fed after dusk, in the low light conditions.

In New Zealand and Australia populations have expanded due to the creation of new artificial lakes and ponds. The subspecies endemic to Palau has been considered endangered, although a 2005 survey found that the subspecies, while potentially threatened, is at least now still common.
