= Lakenheath =

Village in Suffolk, England

Coordinates: 52.4136°N 0.5226°E

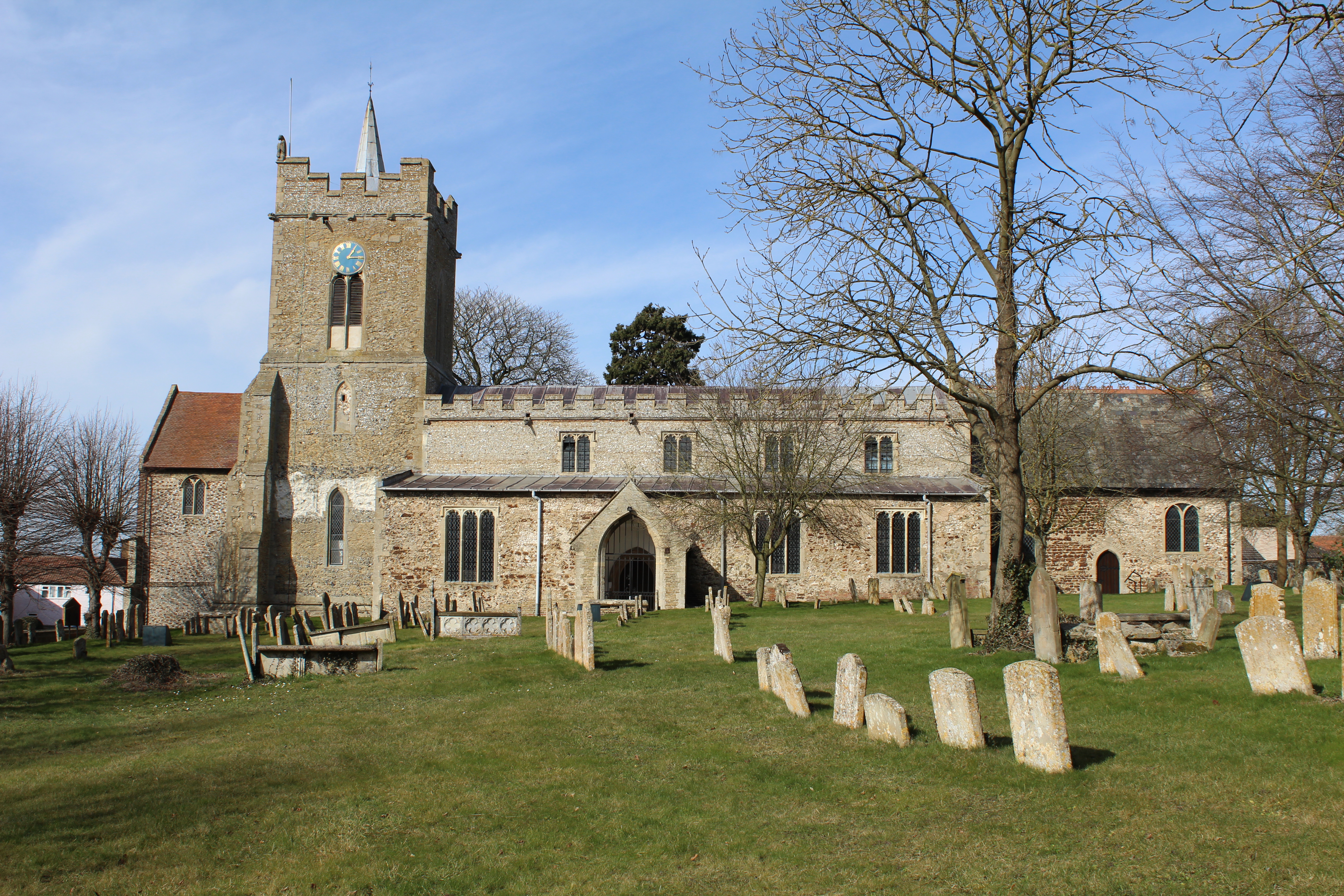
- Church of St Mary the Virgin

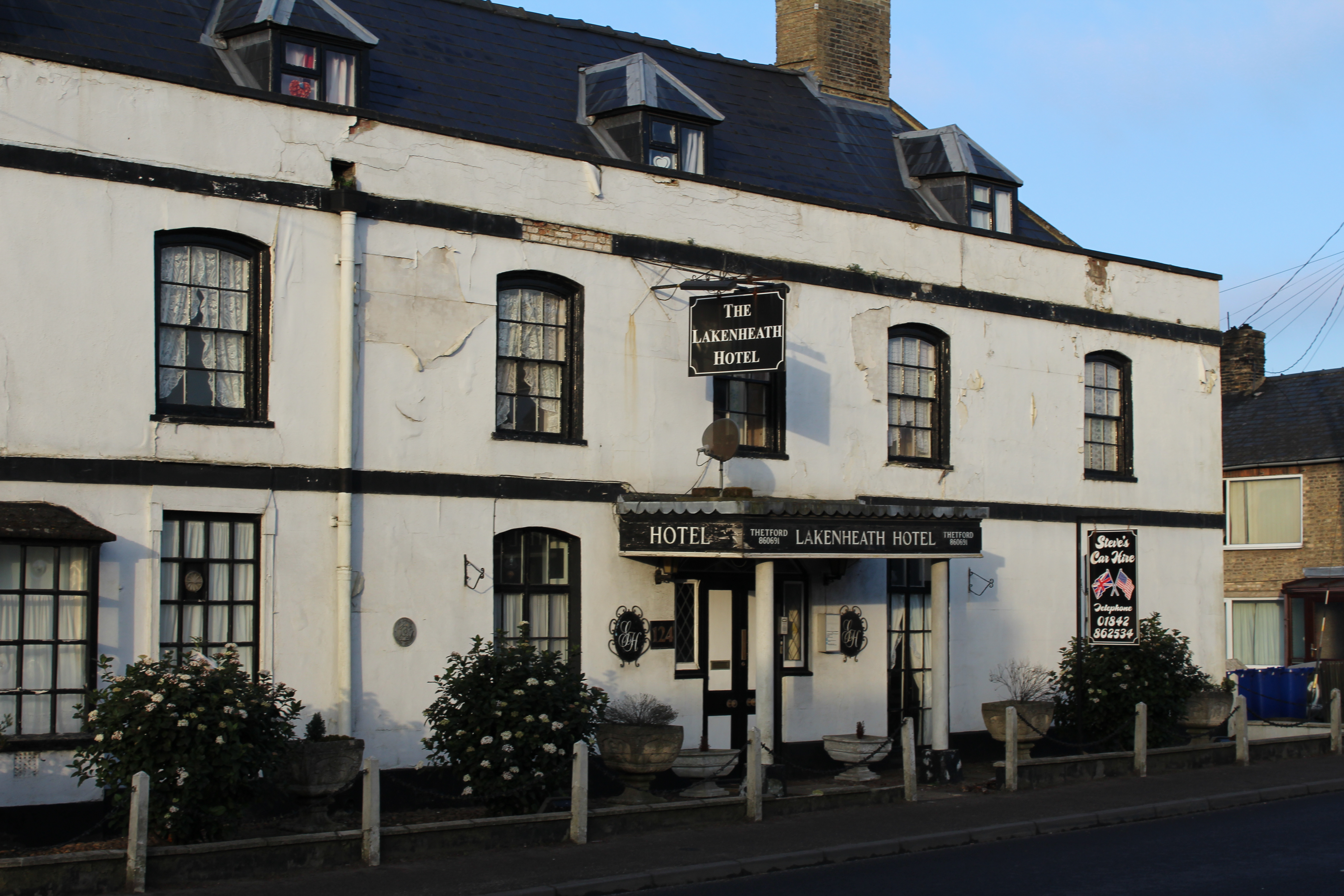
- Goward house

- Location within Suffolk
- Population: 4,691 (2011 Census)
- OS grid reference: TL715825
  - London: 80.72 from High Street to Parliament Square
- Civil parish: Lakenheath
- District: West Suffolk
- Shire county: Suffolk
- Region: East
- Country: England
- Sovereign state: United Kingdom
- Post town: Brandon
- Postcode district: IP27
- Dialling code: 01842
- Police: Suffolk
- Fire: Suffolk
- Ambulance: East of England
- UK Parliament: West Suffolk

Lakenheath is a village and civil parish in the West Suffolk district of Suffolk in eastern England. It has a population of 4,691 according to the 2011 Census, and is situated close to the county boundaries of both Norfolk and Cambridgeshire, and at the meeting point of The Fens and the Breckland natural environments.

Lakenheath is host to the largest United States Air Force base in the United Kingdom, RAF Lakenheath.

Lakenheath Fen Nature Reserve, created in 1996, restored wetlands from agricultural fields that were growing carrots. In May 2007, it was reported that cranes were nesting in the site for the first time since the fen lands were drained in the 16th century.

The village has a single Victorian primary school, constructed in 1878, which was extended in 1969, again in 2004 and most recently in 2010/2011. There is a small shopping street on which a variety of multi-cultural shops, restaurants, and services are available. Horse-riding services are also present. The village has a modern library with various amenities. Along this main road there is a small hotel, skate park, and a children's play park.

Lakenheath has one pub (The Brewers Tap) though historically it had at least sixteen more. The Royal British Legion was a members-only club, but closed in April 2012. The Villagers managed to raise the funds to purchase the property, and it now houses The Lakenheath Peace Memorial Hall, with a 130 seat theatre and stage, The Old Legion (Lakenheath) Community centre and bar. It is now dedicated to providing a safe place for families and children of the village to exercise and enjoy.

Lakenheath is remarkable for its medieval church, built about 900 years ago in wood, eventually being rebuilt in the local flint construction style. The church on the exterior has an embattled parapet that has an array of gargoyles and other carved faces at the string course at the base. The interior includes medieval paintings and carvings on the pews. The faces of the church's wooden angels bear the scars of the English Civil War, as none of the angels retained their original facial detail, due to religiously motivated vandalism by puritan soldiers. In early 2009, the church received a large grant from the Heritage Lottery Fund and local organisations to restore its rare medieval wall paintings. The wall paintings, depicting local saint St Edmund, angels, and birds amongst other subjects, are believed to date from the 13th century.

As well as the Anglican parish church, Lakenheath has churches representing the Methodist, Strict Baptist and Pentecostal (AOG) denominations. All three of the non-Anglican church buildings are also primarily constructed of local flint, albeit with later modifications in brick.

The recently built pavilion now houses the local cricket club and hosts various events.

Lakenheath also boasts a football club playing at ‘The PIt’ stadium in the village. The club, in 2021 won promotion to the Thurlow Nunn League Premier Division, the highest they have ever been and, won the Suffolk Senior Cup for the second time in their history.

== Transport ==
Lakenheath railway station, 3 miles (4.8 km) north of the village, sees very little passenger service.

There are regular bus services to the neighbouring towns of Brandon, Mildenhall and Thetford plus buses to Bury St. Edmunds operated on school/college days which are available to the general public.

== RAF Lakenheath ==
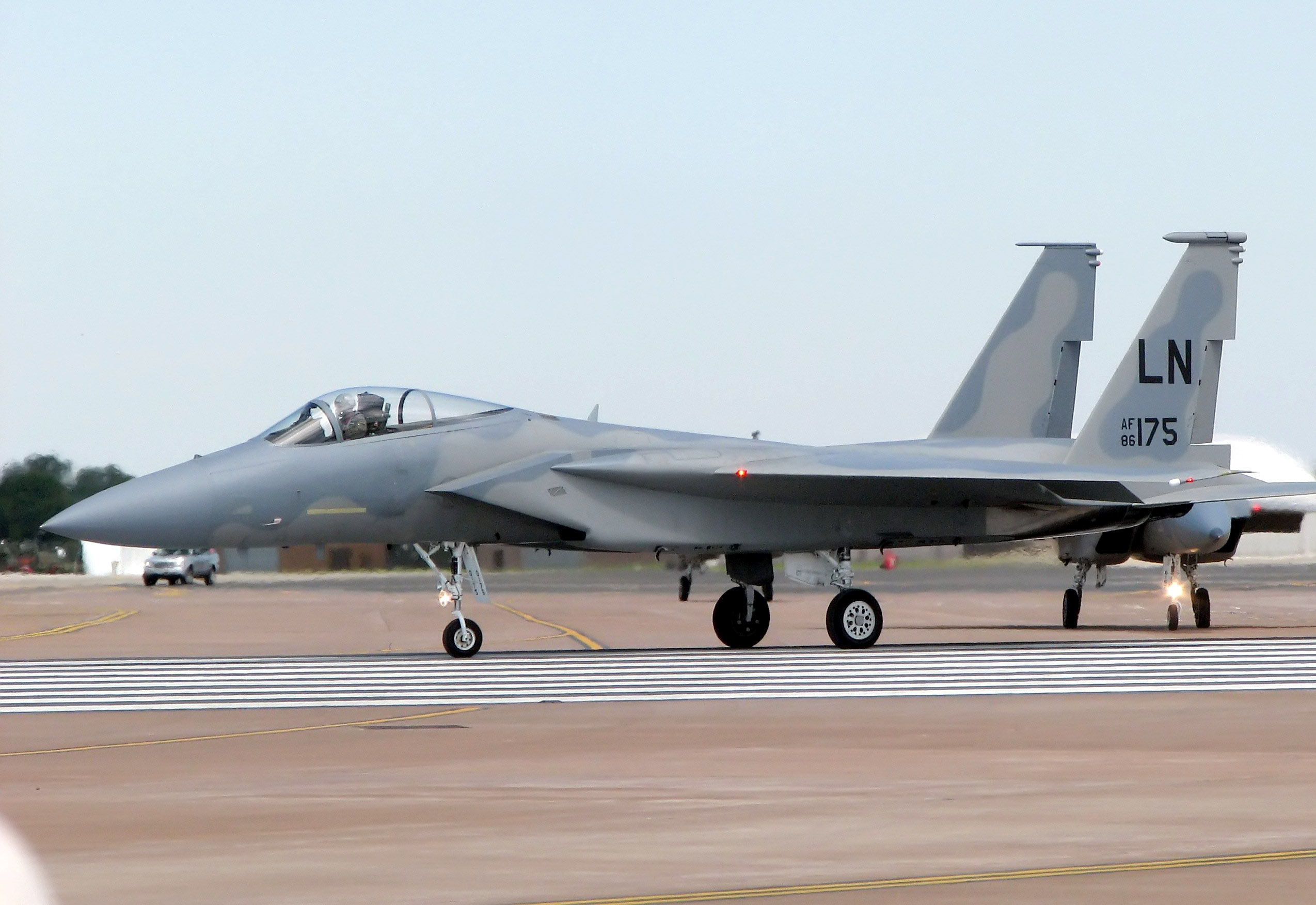
An F-15C Eagle of the United States Air Force taxis for takeoff. The LN on the tail means this aircraft is based at RAF Lakenheath.

Lakenheath is host to the largest deployment of United States Air Force personnel in the United Kingdom: RAF Lakenheath. The social impact of the United States Air Force fighter airbase and its nearby sister, RAF Mildenhall, on the economy of Lakenheath and on the nearby towns and villages is important. The United States has maintained a presence in the community since bombers were stationed there during WWII conducting raids on Europe. The base has a population of around 6000 service personnel.

== Prehistory and archaeology ==
During the Ice Age, the River Bytham flowed through the area that is now Lakenheath, depositing much of the modern geology found in the area.

Excavation of three early Anglo-Saxon cemeteries at RAF Lakenheath between 1997 and 2002 uncovered a total of 394 inhumation and 17 cremation burials, including one 6th-century grave with a horse burial: a man was buried next to a fully armoured horse.

== History ==
During the Peasants' Revolt in 1381, Sir John Cavendish, the Chief Justice of the King's Bench and Chancellor of the University of Cambridge was pursued by rebels and caught in Lakenheath. He was taken to Bury St Edmunds and beheaded there.

The village was struck by an F0/T1 tornado on 23 November 1981, as part of the record-breaking nationwide tornado outbreak on that day.

== Climate ==
Lakenheath has an oceanic climate similar to the rest of the region of East of England. It is therefore warmer and drier than the average climate of the British Isles due to its relative distance to the low-pressure dominated coastal weather systems of the Atlantic.

Climate data for Lakenheath, 1981–2010
Month	Jan	Feb	Mar	Apr	May	Jun	Jul	Aug	Sep	Oct	Nov	Dec	Year
Record high °C (°F)	16 (61)	18 (64)	22.8 (73.0)	27 (81)	29 (84)	34 (93)	34 (93)	35 (95)	31.1 (88.0)	29.1 (84.4)	18 (64)	15 (59)	35 (95)
Mean daily maximum °C (°F)	7.3 (45.1)	8.4 (47.1)	10.9 (51.6)	14.2 (57.6)	17.5 (63.5)	20.5 (68.9)	22.6 (72.7)	22.4 (72.3)	19.6 (67.3)	15.4 (59.7)	10.8 (51.4)	7.0 (44.6)	14.8 (58.6)
Daily mean °C (°F)	4.6 (40.3)	5.6 (42.1)	7.1 (44.8)	9.5 (49.1)	12.8 (55.0)	15.8 (60.4)	18.0 (64.4)	17.8 (64.0)	15.2 (59.4)	11.7 (53.1)	7.7 (45.9)	4.3 (39.7)	10.9 (51.6)
Mean daily minimum °C (°F)	1.8 (35.2)	1.8 (35.2)	3.2 (37.8)	4.8 (40.6)	8.1 (46.6)	11.0 (51.8)	13.5 (56.3)	13.1 (55.6)	10.7 (51.3)	7.9 (46.2)	4.6 (40.3)	1.7 (35.1)	6.9 (44.4)
Record low °C (°F)	−15.6 (3.9)	−13.3 (8.1)	−10 (14)	−6.1 (21.0)	−3.3 (26.1)	−1.7 (28.9)	3.3 (37.9)	2.6 (36.7)	0.6 (33.1)	−5 (23)	−8.3 (17.1)	−13.9 (7.0)	−15.6 (3.9)
Average precipitation mm (inches)	67.2 (2.65)	65.6 (2.58)	43.5 (1.71)	31.8 (1.25)	40.5 (1.59)	55.5 (2.19)	45.7 (1.80)	58.0 (2.28)	37.8 (1.49)	48.1 (1.89)	56.8 (2.24)	52.1 (2.05)	598.9 (23.58)
Source: Météo Climat
