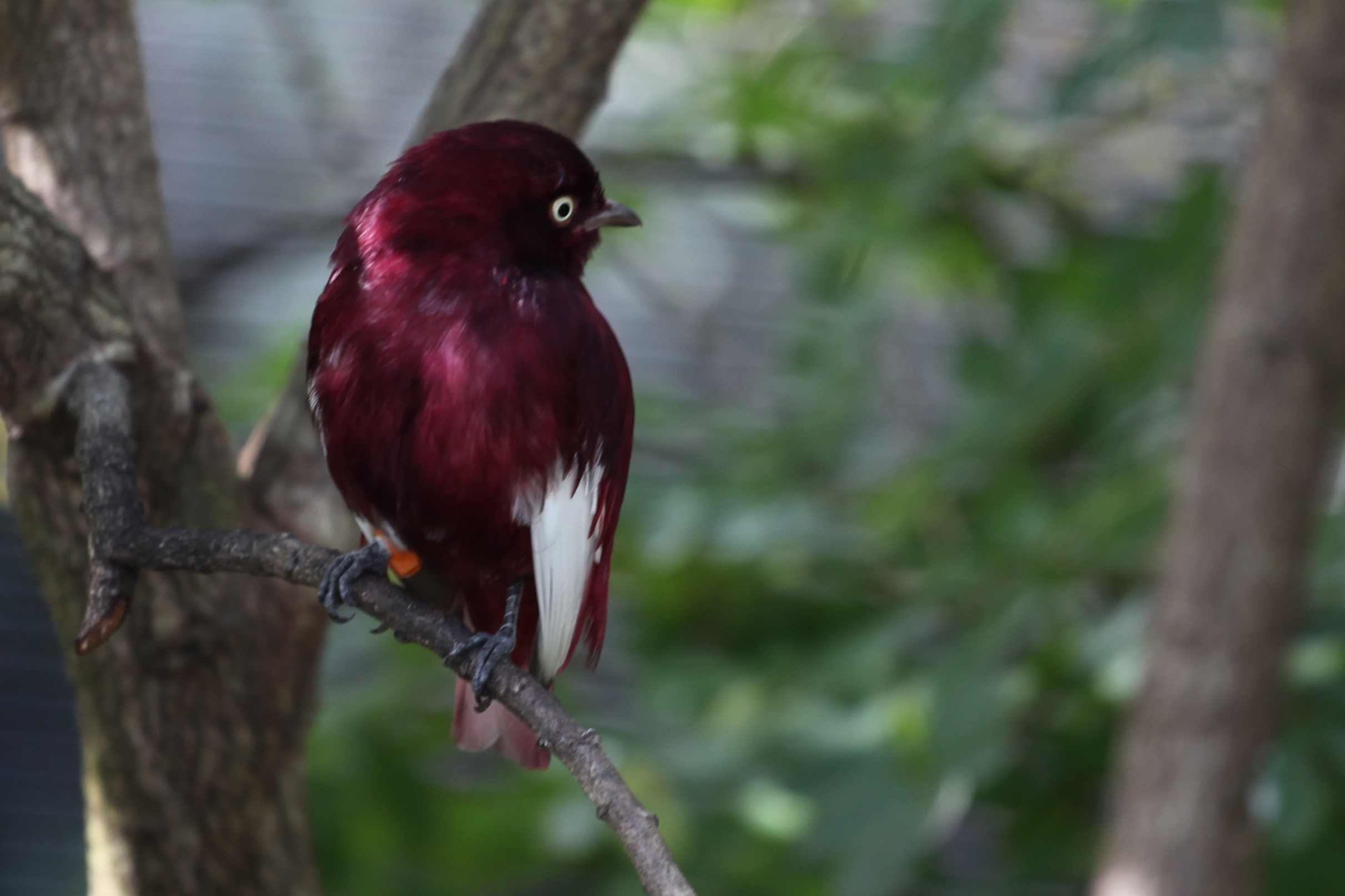
- A male Pompadour cotinga

Scientific classification
- Kingdom: Animalia
- Phylum: Chordata
- Class: Aves
- Order: Passeriformes
- Family: Cotingidae
- Genus: Xipholena; Gloger, 1841

Type species
- Ampelis pompadora Linnaeus, 1766

Species
- see text

= Xipholena =

Genus of birds

Xipholena is a genus of passerine birds in the family Cotingidae.

It contains three species:

Image	Scientific name	Common name	Distribution
	Xipholena punicea	Pompadour cotinga	Amazon basin & Guianas
	Xipholena lamellipennis	White-tailed cotinga	northern Brazil
	Xipholena atropurpurea	White-winged cotinga	Atlantic Forest
