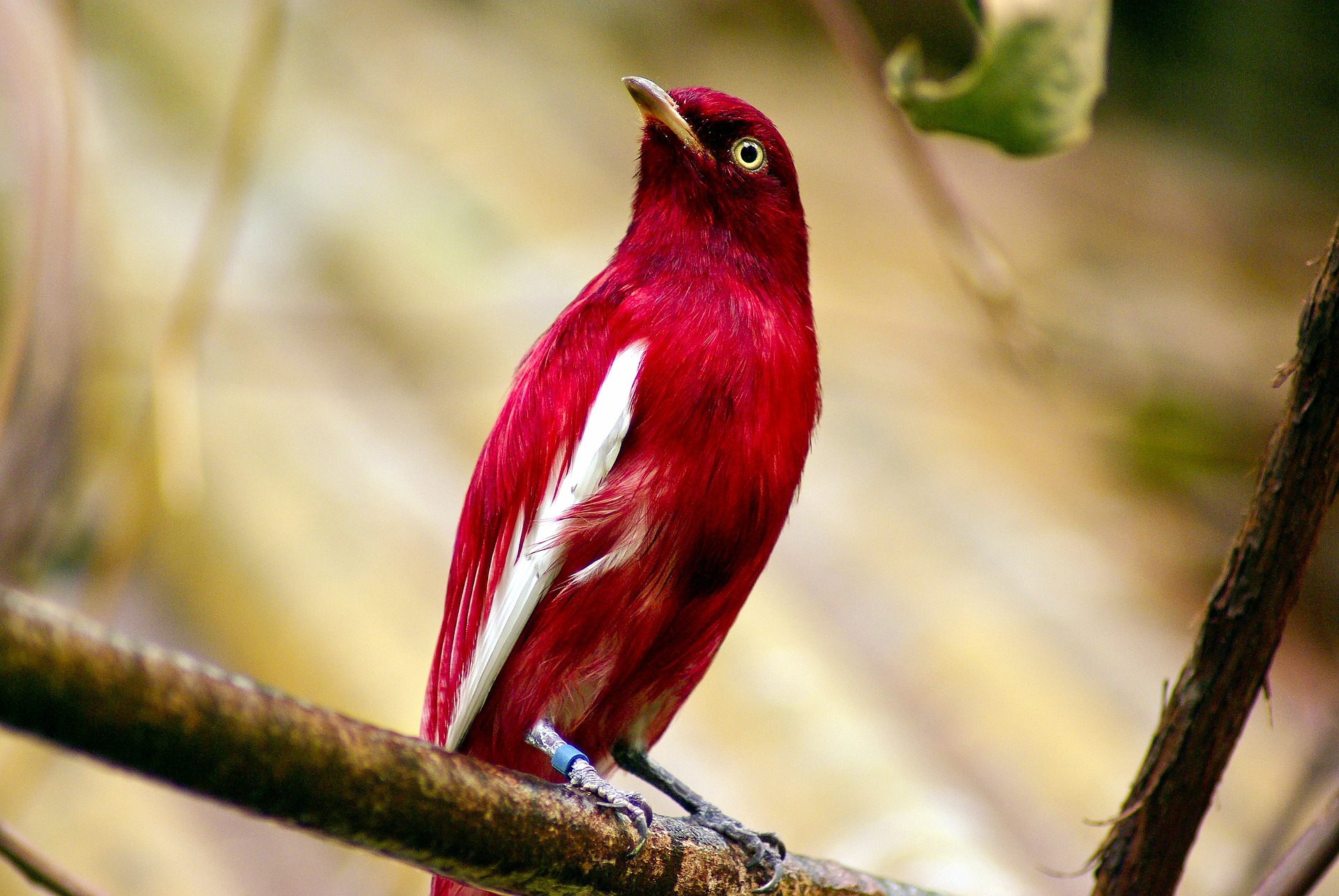
- Male perched pompadour cotinga

Conservation status
- Least Concern (IUCN 3.1)

Scientific classification
- Kingdom: Animalia
- Phylum: Chordata
- Class: Aves
- Order: Passeriformes
- Family: Cotingidae
- Genus: Xipholena
- Species: X. punicea

Binomial name
- Xipholena punicea (Pallas, 1764)
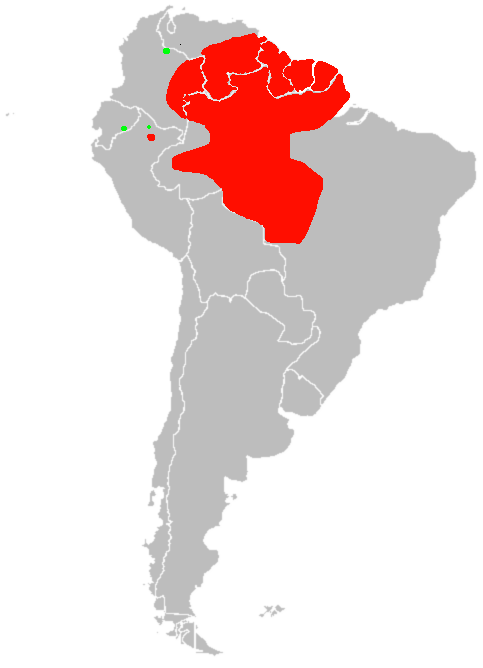
- Pompadour cotinga distribution: Year-round range Vagrant range

Synonyms
- Turdus puniceus Pallas, 1764

= Pompadour cotinga =

Species of bird

The pompadour cotinga (Xipholena punicea) is a species of bird in the family Cotingidae. This species lives in the Amazonian rainforest and has a range that extends across the Amazon Basin and includes Brazil, Peru, Colombia, Venezuela, and the Guianas. The pompadour cotinga is primarily a frugivore but has been known to consume insects on occasion. This species of cotinga is distinct in that the males have a burgundy head and body, bright white wings, and yellow eyes. Like other members of the Cotingidae, this species is sexually dimorphic and the females have a pale grey head and body. Although there are not many documented observations of the nesting behavior of these birds, the males are known to perform elaborate mating displays for the females who then raise the young alone.

Due to its arboreal habitat and generally remote distribution, behavior observations are rare. Pompadour cotinga coloration has been studied extensively, but little is known about the natural history of its behavior and existence in its habitat. Despite threats to Amazonian habitat in recent years, the pompadour cotinga remains a species of least concern.

== Taxonomy ==
The first documentation of the pompadour cotinga was in the 1764 auction catalogue of Dutch natural history collector Adriaan Vroeg which listed many species of birds and mammal specimens which were to be sold in glass cases. The catalogue included an appendix Adumbratiunculae by the Dutch naturalist Peter Simon Pallas. This was written in Latin and used the protonym Turdus puniceus to describe the species. Birds of the family Cotingidae tend to share certain characteristics such as hooked beaks, strong sexual dimorphism, and mating displays performed by the males. The most recent phylogeny created in 2014 examined the family using genetic analyses of both nuclear and mitochondrial genes, and compared the results to the synapomorphies among birds of certain clades. The breeding behavior and sexual dimorphism of certain species did not seem to be connected to the phylogenetic relationships that had been created from the genetic data. However, certain characteristics such as vocal activity did correlate with shared anatomical morphologies among certain clades and were used to support the genetic data. For instance, members of Xipholena punicea tend to be quieter than other members of Cotingidae and that behavior is shared with their sister taxa Carpodectes. This low vocal activity is likely reflected in the syrinx morphology of both species of birds. In addition to this characteristic, these genera share physical similarities such as the bright white wings which are displayed as the male birds fly through the treetops.

== Description ==
Individuals of Xipholena punicea are sexually dimorphic, with males displaying bright, complex colorization and females appearing more pale and grey. Males of this species have yellow eyes, stark white primary coverts with black wing tips, and a glossy, wine-red head and body. The distinguished burgundy color of the male individuals was previously thought to be a combination of "blue structural color and red carotenoid," but recent experimentation has shown that this species of Cotingidae does not utilize structural coloration. This distinct colorization consists of pigments from eight different carotenoids, six of which are unique to the Xipholena punicea species itself. These six pigments were found to be "ring-substituted, methoxy carotenoids" and were likely formed through chemical reactions of other dietary carotenoids. These species-specific carotenoids are significant in the study of Xipholena punicea because other species of birds are not known to use the same pathways for carotenoid construction that are used by the pompadour cotinga. Additionally, the complexity of the creation of these pigments allows for an added diversity in the carotenoid products themselves and further distinguishes X. punicea from other members of the genus.

Both male and female pompadour cotinga have a "short beak and wide gape". This trait is shared by other members of the family Cotingidae and is indicative of a frugivorous diet. Eggs of this species are not well documented, but have been described as bluish-grey and blotched. In addition, chicks undergo a change from white to a blotched-grey color, possibly serving as a form of camouflage in the nest.

== Distribution and habitat ==
Members of the X. punicea occupy the canopy layer of rainforests across South America, including regions in Brazil, Colombia, Venezuela, and the Guianas. In the Northern Peruvian Amazon, they live in the varillal (white sand forest) regions and forage in groups in the Caraipa tereticaulis trees along the Nanay River. Pompadour cotingas generally live in areas of thick vegetation and white, sandy soil which has been darkened and acidified by the decomposition of vegetative material. There have also been rare sightings of possible vagrants in Bolivia and eastern Ecuador outside of their established range.

== Behavior ==
=== Diet ===
The pompadour cotinga is primarily a frugivore, but it consumes insects opportunistically. Members of the species forage in small groupings, and use frequent vocalizations of a "PURP!" noise to communicate with one another. Captive pompadour cotingas have been observed occasionally consuming larger prey. One particular species account described a male pompadour cotinga grabbing an anole and hitting it on a perch before beginning to eat it. Pompadour cotingas may supplement their frugivorous diet with meat during the breeding season when there is increased energy expenditure and young birds to feed.

=== Reproduction ===
There are limited observations of the pompadour cotinga in the wild, with most accounts documenting the complex mating ritual of the species although the exact breeding season is unknown. Males flock in small groups to areas where a female has been spotted constructing a nest. The males then participate in "ritualized chasing," which possibly communicates an order of dominance among the males to the female. As each male flies to a perch occupied by another male to steal their place, they flash their bright white wings over the area where the female watches below. These mating displays tend to be silent on behalf of the males, yet there is a slight noise emanating from the movement of the wings. A pair is formed shortly after breeding, but this relationship is short-lived and abandoned once nesting begins.

=== Parental Care ===
Documentation of parental care in the pompadour cotinga is rare, but it is known that the species is polygynous and that females are the primary caregiver for the young offspring. Additionally, there is usually only one egg per nest. In an account by ornithologist Marcelo Barreiros, the female pompadour cotinga was very attentive to the single egg in the shallow nest that she had built for it, leaving only to forage for food. Once the chick hatched a few days later, the mother spent the majority of the observational period attempting to shield the young chick from the sun. The mother of the chick also fed it berries and ate the feces of the young chick.

== Relationship with humans ==
The most recent information on the conservation status of Xipholena punicea is from an evaluation conducted in August 2018 and has placed the species as of least concern. However, the destruction of the Amazon rainforest has interfered with the habitat of these birds and the species is "suspected to lose 11.5-12.6% of suitable habitat… over three generations," with the population decreasing in suit. Luckily, there is a protection of land and water across the entirety of the habitat but the species itself is not included in any international legislation enforcing protection and there is no plan in place to deal with species recovery in the event of disaster.

Research involving the pompadour cotinga has been difficult because it lives high in the rainforest and is normally concealed from view. In recent years, there has been advocation for improved methods of data collection in the rainforest with one researcher, Bruno Walther, proposing the use of cranes in the field to increase access to the canopy level. Despite the hindrance to observational studies, there is a benefit to living in the canopy. Canopy birds were found to be present in disturbed habitats at higher rates than species who occupy lower levels of the forest. This is likely due to their unique ability to leave regions of disaster and low resources more easily than other species.
