= Lakenheath Fen RSPB reserve =

RSPB nature reserve in the United Kingdom

RSPB Lakenheath Fen
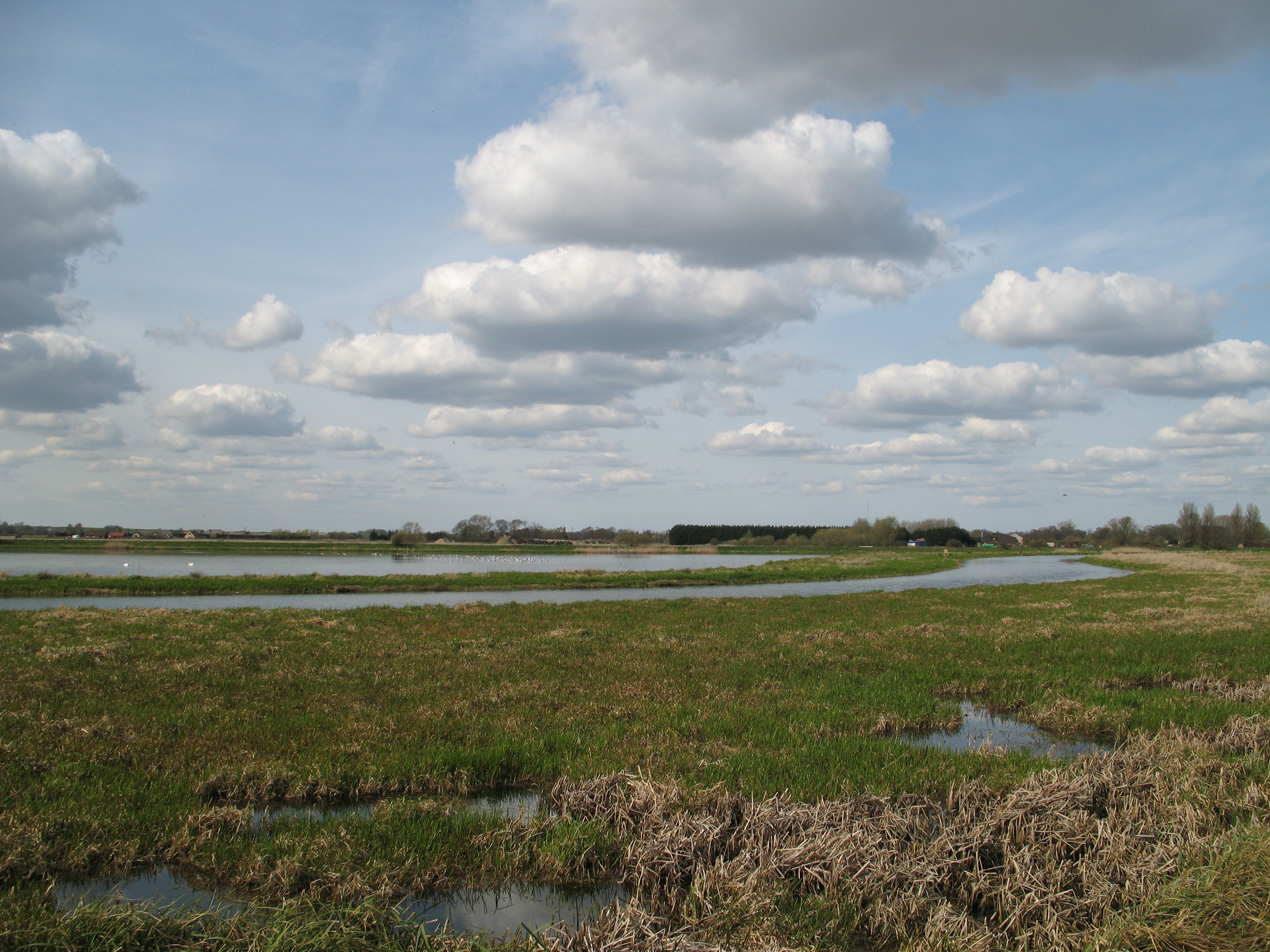
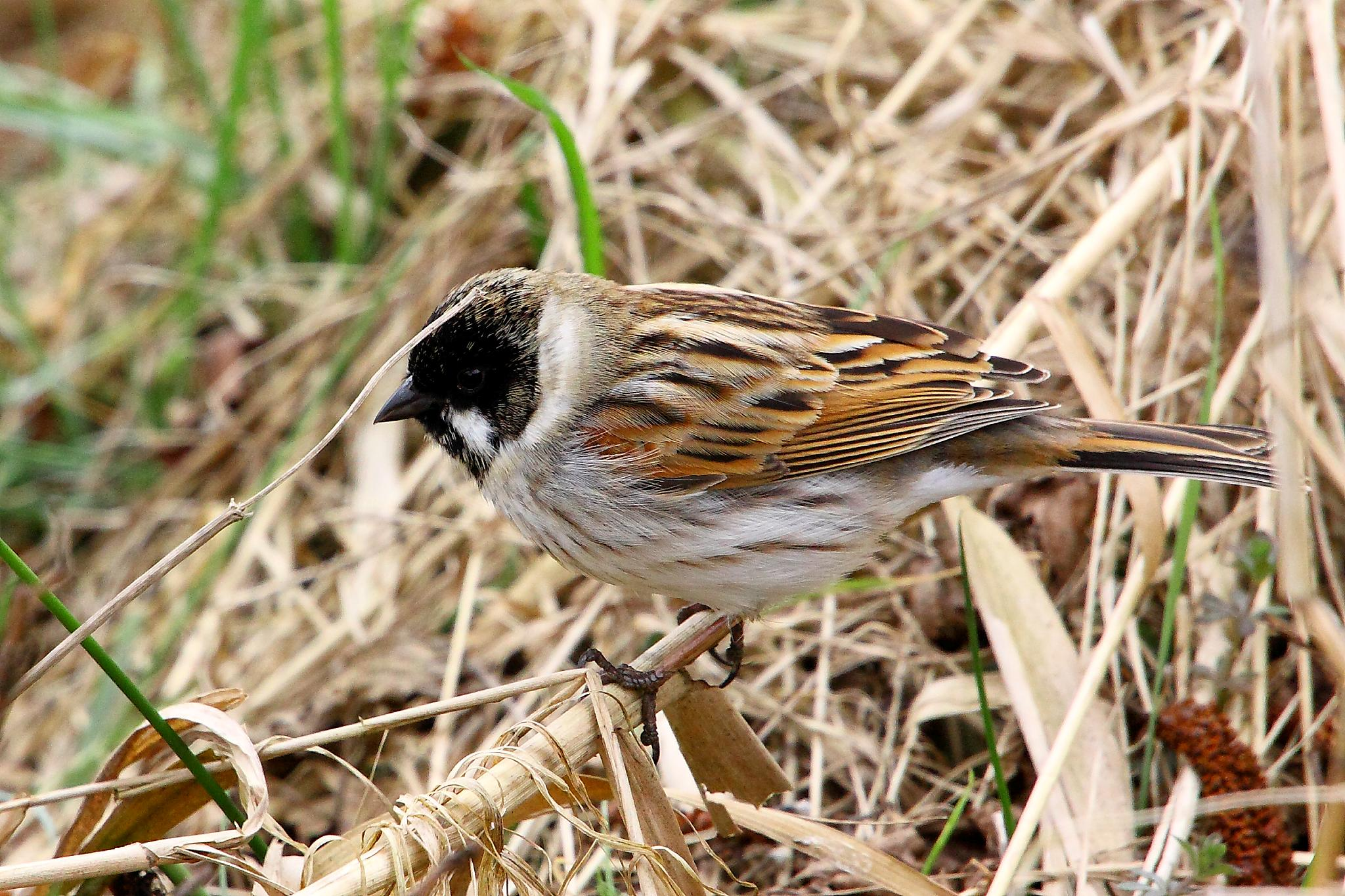
- Looking across the River Little Ouse ǀ Reed bunting at Lakenheath Fen
- Interactive map of RSPB Lakenheath Fen
- Coordinates: 52.4458°N 0.5088°E
- Created: 1995
- Operator: RSPB
- Public transit: Lakenheath railway station
- Website: www.rspb.org.uk/lakenheathfen/

Lakenheath Fen RSPB reserve is located on the Norfolk/Suffolk border in England, between Lakenheath and Hockwold cum Wilton adjacent to Lakenheath railway station. This reserve forms part of a network of Fenland nature reserves close by, which include Wicken Fen, Chippenham Fen and Woodwalton Fen.

== History ==
Until 1995, when purchased by the RSPB, the land now forming the reserve was heavily farmed arable land. Since then, the 740-acre (3.0 km^{2}) site has been turned back into the reed beds and grazing marshes that would once have been common in the area. To achieve this, over 2 km of ditches were re-shaped with shallow sloping sides so as to encourage reed growth and to provide feeding areas. This was primarily to attract Eurasian bitterns to breed at the reserve, which were close to extinction in the UK at the time. A number of sluices were installed to enable water levels to be controlled. In addition to the existing ditches, over 4 km of water channels were dug to re-circulate water around the site.

== Fauna ==
Despite being created fairly recently, Lakenheath Fen is a haven for wildlife, and the number of birds seen at the reserve has increased significantly. The number of Eurasian reed warblers rose from four pairs in 1995 to 355 pairs in 2002. Reed buntings have increased from 6 to 87 pairs during the same period. Two pairs of western marsh harriers nested for the first time in newly created reed in 2002. Great crested grebes and little grebes are breeding on the meres, and water rails have nested in the new reeds. Bearded tits have stayed on the reserve throughout the winter, as have bitterns, along with a whooper swan roost. Common cranes have been found to be breeding at the fen for what is believed to be the first time in 400 years.Bewick's swan, short-eared owl, merlin and hen harrier have also been known to appear at Lakenheath Fen.

RSPB Lakenheath Fen is home to a significant proportion of Great Britain's sightings of the Eurasian golden oriole. Though not resident, Eurasian golden orioles are recorded as summer passage migrants in Great Britain, and occur in small numbers on the South Coast of England and in East Anglia, with an average of 85 birds recorded annually. Eurasian golden orioles favour RSPB Lakenheath Fen and the surrounding Fenland in East Anglia due to the large number of poplar plantations.

In summer, there is a wide variety of butterflies, dragonflies and moths.
