= Brain Structure and Function =

- Discipline: Neuroscience
- Language: English
- Edited by: Michel Thiebaut de Schotten and Susan R. Sesack

Publication details
- Former name(s): Anatomische Hefte, Zeitschrift für Anatomie und Entwicklungsgeschichte, Anatomy and Embryology
- History: 1891–present
- Publisher: Springer Science+Business Media
- Frequency: Bimonthly
- Impact factor: 3.270 (2020)

Standard abbreviations
- ISO 4: Brain Struct. Funct.

Indexing
- CODEN: BSFRCD
- ISSN: 1863-2653 (print); 1863-2661 (web)
- LCCN: 2007243247
- OCLC no.: 804279700

Links
- Journal homepage; Online access

Brain Structure and Function is a bimonthly peer-reviewed scientific journal covering research on brain structure-function relationships. It was established in 1891 as Anatomische Hefte, renamed first Zeitschrift für Anatomie und Entwicklungsgeschichte in 1921 and then Anatomy and Embryology in 1974, before obtaining its current name in 2007. It is published by Springer Science+Business Media and the editors-in-chief are Michel Thiebaut de Schotten and Susan R. Sesack.

== Abstracting and indexing ==
The journal is abstracted and indexed in:

- Science Citation Index
- PubMed/MEDLINE
- Scopus
- PsycINFO
- EMBASE
- Chemical Abstracts Service
- EBSCO databases
- Academic OneFile
- AGRICOLA
- Biological Abstracts
- BIOSIS Previews
- Current Contents/Life Sciences
- Elsevier Biobase
- EMBiology
- INIS Atomindex
- International Bibliography of Book Reviews
- International Bibliography of Periodical Literature
- The Zoological Record

According to the Journal Citation Reports, the journal has a 2020 impact factor of 3.270.
