= Natusch =

Natusch is a surname. Notable people with the surname include:

- Alberto Natusch (1933–1994), Bolivian general and dictator
- Charles Natusch (1859–1951), New Zealand architect and quantity surveyor
- Erich Natusch (1912–1999), German sailor
- Guy Natusch (1921–2020), New Zealand architect
- Sheila Natusch (1926–2017), New Zealand writer and illustrator
- Tim Natusch (born 1986), New Zealand rugby league footballer
