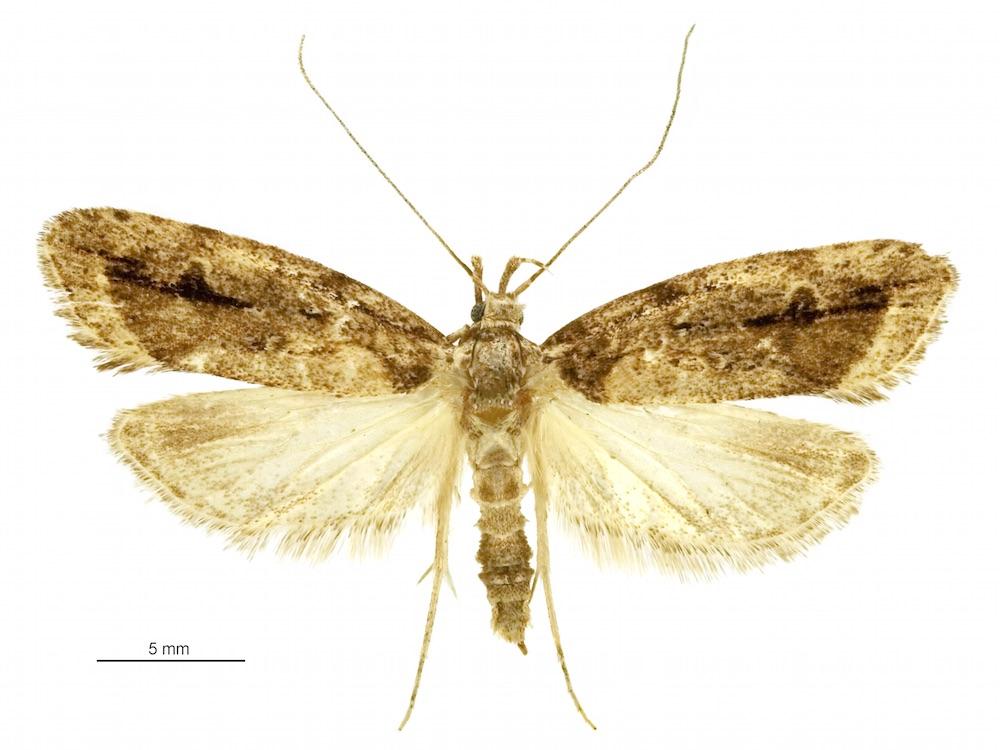
- Female
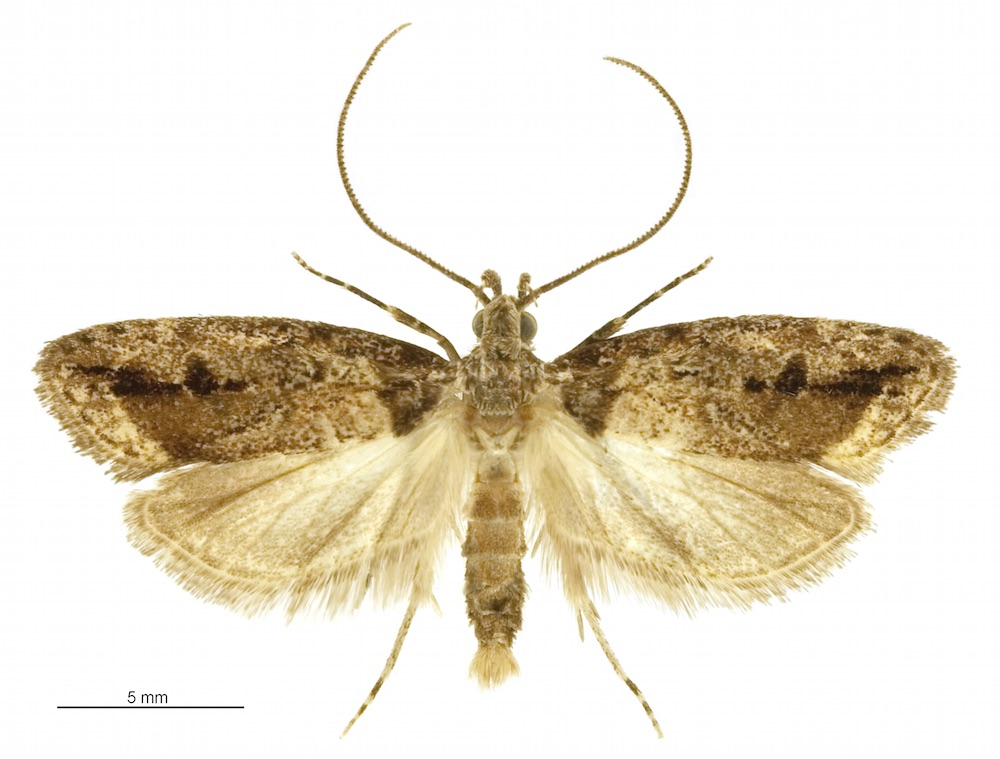
- Male

Scientific classification
- Kingdom: Animalia
- Phylum: Arthropoda
- Clade: Pancrustacea
- Class: Insecta
- Order: Lepidoptera
- Family: Oecophoridae
- Genus: Izatha
- Species: I. caustopa

Binomial name
- Izatha caustopa (Meyrick, 1892)

Synonyms
- Semiocosma caustopa Meyrick, 1892

= Izatha caustopa =

Species of moth

Izatha caustopa is a lichen tuft moth in the family Oecophoridae. It is endemic to New Zealand, where it is known very locally, and very infrequently, from the southern half of the North Island: two specimens collected in 2016 were the first seen for 30 years. It is classified as "Data Deficient" by the Department of Conservation.

== Taxonomy ==
This species was described by Edward Meyrick in 1892 using a female specimen collected by George Hudson in Wellington and named Semiocosma caustopa. Hudson discussed and illustrated the species in his 1928 book The Butterflies and Moths of New Zealand. The genus Semiocosma was subsequently synonymised with Izatha by Meyrick resulting in this species being known as Izatha caustopa. The female holotype specimen is held at the Natural History Museum, London.

== Description ==
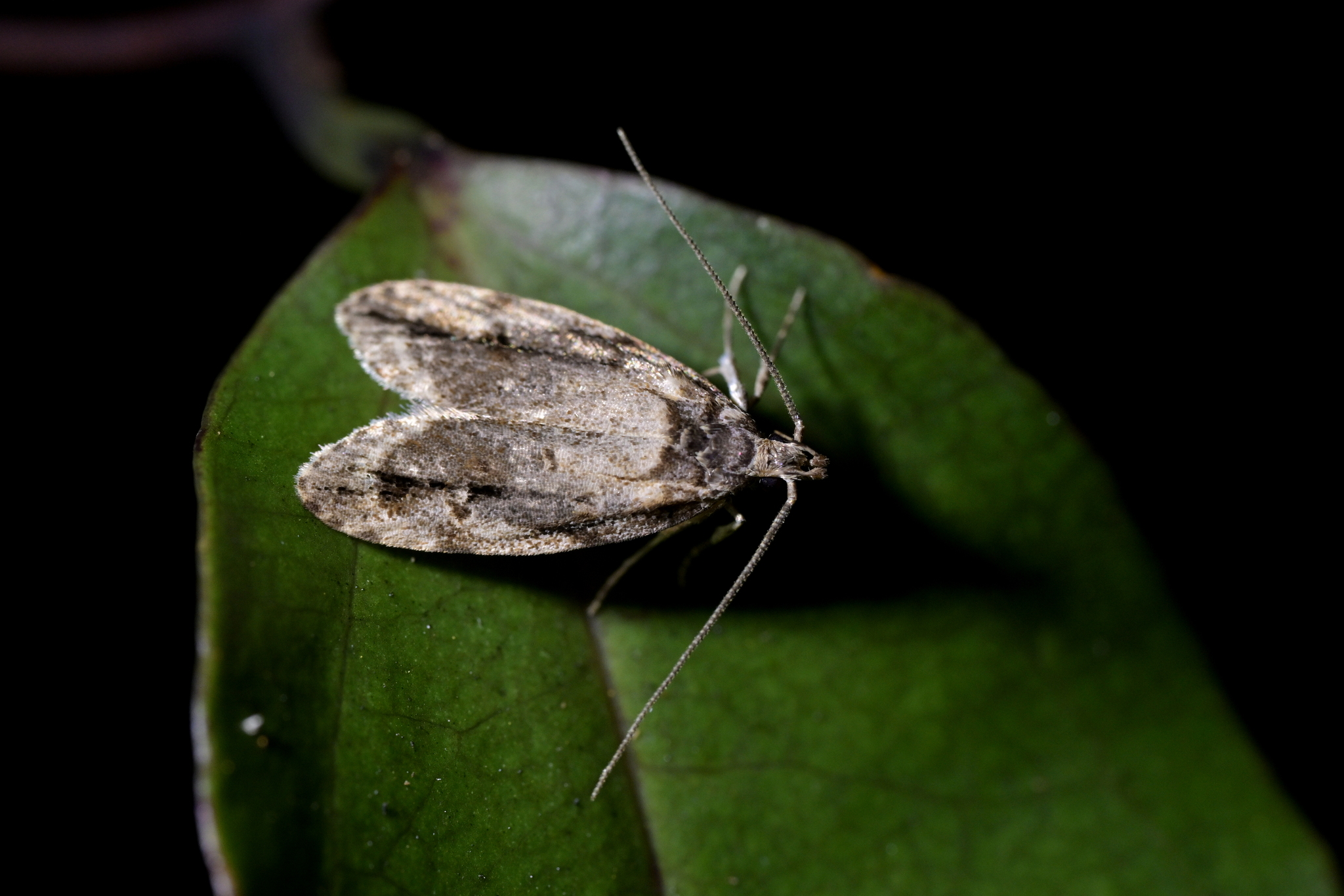
I. caustopa at Ōtari-Wilton's Bush

Meyrick originally described the species as follows:

♀︎ . 28mm. Head light fuscous, mixed with fuscous-whitish. Palpi ochreous-whitish, second joint suftusedly mixed with dark fuscous, terminal joint with dark-fuscous sub-basal ring and median band. Antennae rather dark fuscous. Thorax dark fuscous mixed with fuscous-whitish. (Abdomen broken.) Legs dark fuscouS; ringed with whitish; posterior tibiae whitish. Forewings elongate, costa moderately arched, apex rounded, hindmargin almost straight, oblique; fuscous-whitish, suffusedly mixed with fuscous and dark fuscous, veins remaining pale posteriorly; a dark-fuscous basal patch, its outer edge angulated on discal tuft; a large dark fuscous trapezoidal blotch occupying whole of disc, posterior edge well defined, near and parallel to hindmargin, other edges suffused; a cloudy blackish dot in disc at 1/3; a cloudy black longitudinal streak from middle of disc to near apex, upper edge forming a rounded projection before 2/3 of disc, posterior extremity irregular, surrounded by fuscous suffusion : cilia fuscous, mixed with fuscous- whitish. Hindwings fuscous-whitish, posteriorly sprinkled with fuscous; cilia fuscous-whitish, suffusedly mixed with light fuscous

I. caustopa has a rather large wingspan for the genus: 24–26 mm for males and 29–31.5 mm for females.

== Distribution ==
This species is endemic to New Zealand. Although only known very locally this species has been found in the Taupo, Hawkes Bay, and Wellington areas. Hudson noted this species was found in a few patches of tree fuchsia at Gollans Valley and Wilton's Bush, Wellington; he collected his last specimen in 1942. A single specimen was collected in Ohakune in 1921, and two more at Puketitiri (near Napier), in 1964 and 1985. I. caustopa had not been seen for 30 years when two specimens was discovered in 2016 at Bushy Park near Whanganui.

== Biology and host species ==
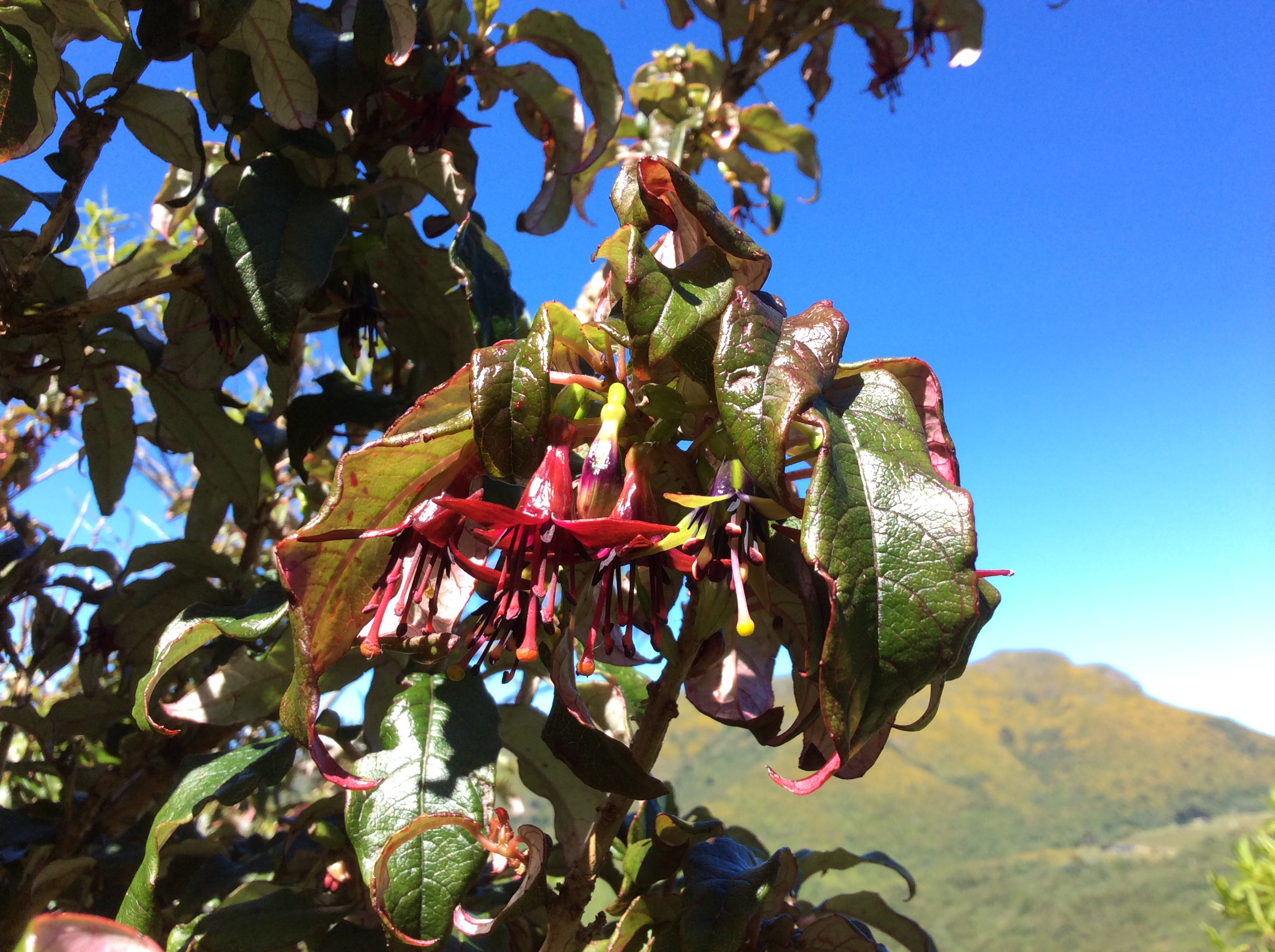
Larval host plant kōtukutuku

Hudson reared the moths from dead branches of kōtukutuku (Fuchsia excorticata) collected in Karori, Wellington. He noted the larvae "feed during the winter months... driving burrows through the soft wood in all directions"—like most lichen tuft moths, they are probably feeding on fungi. They are full grown by about October. Adults have been recorded mostly in January and February, with single records for December and April.

== Conservation status and rarity ==
This species has been classified as having the "Data Deficient" conservation status under the New Zealand Threat Classification System. Its rarity may be linked to the decline of its host tree, which is a favourite food of introduced possums. It may actually be quite common in small pockets of forest in the North Island, and simply have been overlooked, since it is not attracted to bright light the way most moths are; the specimens at Bushy Park were caught in a Malaise trap.
