= Bushy Park Homestead =

Homestead in Manawatū-Whanganui, New Zealand

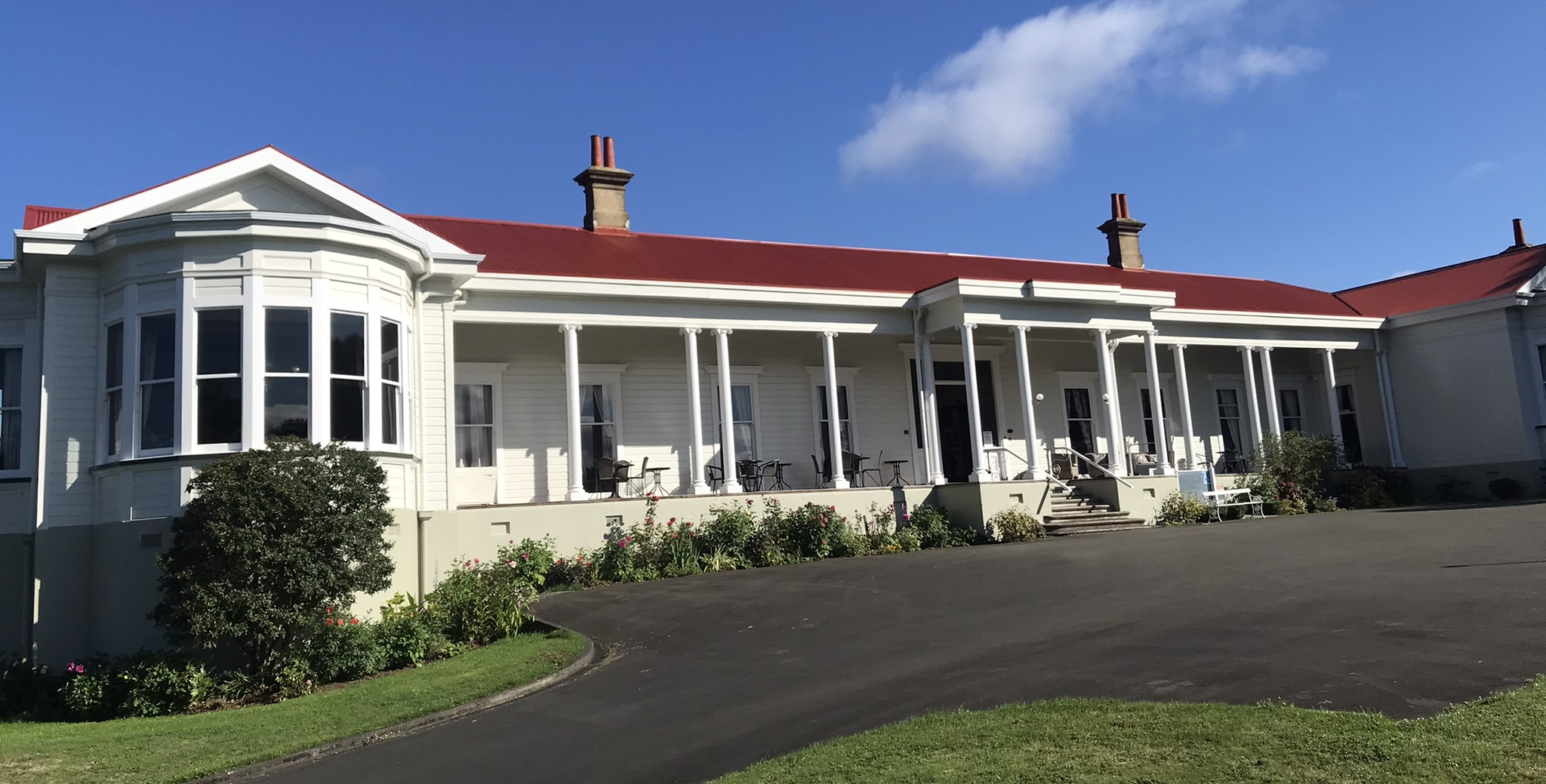
- Bushy Park Homestead in 2022
- Interactive map of the Bushy Park Homestead area

General information
- Architectural style: Regency architecture, American colonial architecture
- Location: 791 Rangitatau East Road, Manawatū–Whanganui
- Coordinates: 39°47′51″S 174°55′51″E
- Completed: 1906
- Owner: Bushy Park Trust

Design and construction
- Architect: Charles Tilleard Natusch

Heritage New Zealand – Category 1
- Designated: 22 November 1984
- Reference no.: 157

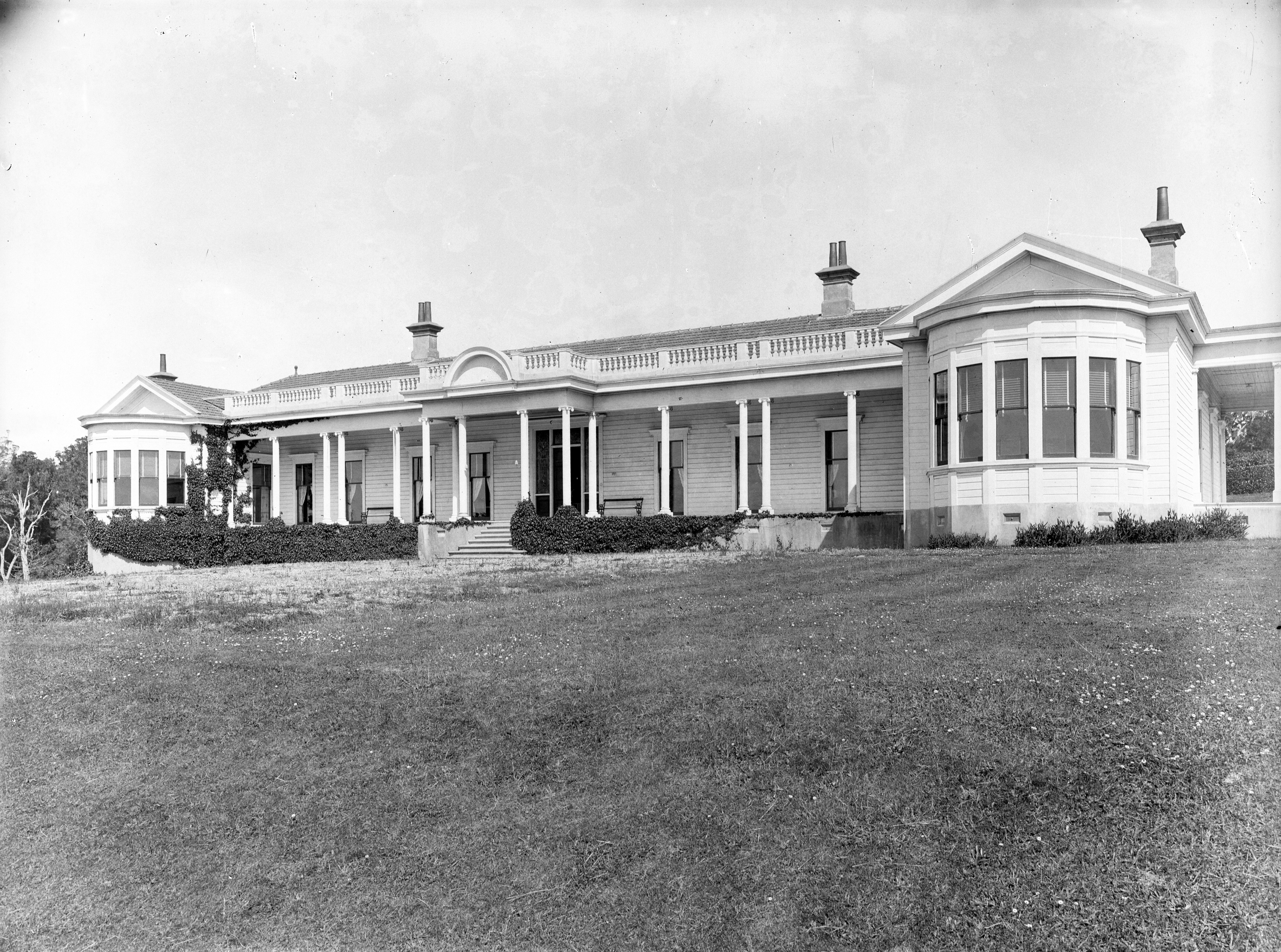
Bushy Park Homestead, 1919

Bushy Park Homestead is an Edwardian-era homestead located in the Bushy Park forest sanctuary, 8 km (5.0 mi) from Kai Iwi, in the Manawatū–Whanganui region of New Zealand. The homestead was designed by Charles Tilleard Natusch, and built for G. Frank Moore, a cattle and racehorse breeder. It was completed in 1906. When Moore died in 1962, the Bushy Park Homestead and 89 ha (220 acres) of adjoining forest were bequeathed to the Royal Forest and Bird Protection Society. In 1995, the Bushy Park Trust took over ownership of the homestead, and now leases the building for proprietors to operate as accommodation and as an events venue. The main homestead is registered as a Category I historic place by Heritage New Zealand, and the adjacent stables buildings are registered as a Category II historic place.

== Design and construction ==
The homestead was designed by English-born New Zealand architect Charles Tilleard Natusch, and was built for G. Frank Moore, a cattle and racehorse breeder. Natusch was working from premises in Napier at this time, and began designing the Bushy Park house in 1904. It was built in timber, on concrete foundations and had a tiled roof. The homestead was built by Russell and Bignell, and was completed in 1906 at a cost of £4,566.

The house is long and narrow, with large bay windows in the rooms at each end. The design includes a 33 m (109 ft) long, 1.8 m (6 ft)-wide hall that runs the length of the residence, as well as wood panelling, carved mantels, and Art Deco lights. It has 22 rooms, including five bedrooms, and is furnished with a wide range of period furniture and artworks. The bathroom facilities are shared. One of the notable features of the house is the carved mantelpiece in the dining room, created by Thomas Dewson from Wanganui. The columned veranda on the south-east side of the building provides outdoor seating with views towards the sea and the distant Ruahine ranges.

== History ==
Frank Moore hosted many visitors at Bushy Park Homestead, particularly in relation to his work in breeding cattle and horses. Other visitors to the homestead included annual meets of the Egmont-Wanganui Hunt Club in the early 1900s, a touring group of British bowlers in 1926, a Parliamentary party in 1936, an Australian surf life-saving team in 1937, and Canadian bowlers in 1948. When Moore died in 1962, the Bushy Park Homestead and 89 ha (220 acres) of adjoining forest were bequeathed to the Royal Forest and Bird Protection Society.

In 1984, the Bushy Park Homestead was registered as a Category 1 historic place by the New Zealand Historic Places Trust (now known as Heritage New Zealand). It was recognised for being designed by one of New Zealand's foremost architects, and for its long association with the Royal Forest and Bird Protection Society.

In the 1980s and early 1990s, there were suggestions that the property should be sold. This led to the establishment of the Bushy Park Trust in 1994, and the transfer of the ownership and management of the homestead and its immediate surrounds to the trust in 1995. The Bushy Park Trust became a registered charity in 2008. The trust leases the homestead for proprietors to operate as a business, offering accommodation and a venue for events.

By 2017, the building was in a poor condition. The roof had slumped significantly in the 2016 Kaikōura Earthquake and there were leaks around chimneys, leading to significant water ingress. A major renovation project was undertaken by Shane Stone builders, including removing all the original roof tiles, and fitting a new iron roof over the entire building. The work was funded with support from Lottery Grants Board, Four Regions Trust, Whanganui Heritage Trust, Whanganui Community Foundation, and Eleanor Burgess Trust. The renovations cost $1.4 million.

In 2020, at the inaugural Whanganui Regional Heritage Awards, the Bushy Park Tarapuruhi Trust was announced as joint category winners of the heritage tourism award, along with the trusts that own and operate PS Waimarie on the Whanganui River.

The New Zealand String Quartet played their touring concert programme 2024 Sounds of the Sanctuary in the main lounge of the homestead in September 2024.

== Stables ==
The original 1906 homestead buildings include a stables to the north west of the main house. The stables include a wool shed, wagon shed, stable boxes and a shed for a gig, with an engine room that contains a 1904 Hornsby–Akroyd oil engine that powered an electricity generator. There was also a battery room to provide electricity supply overnight. The stables were listed as a Category II Historic Place in 1982. The stable buildings are now used as a museum and interpretation centre.

== Homestead business ==
As of 2023, the proprietor is Dale Pullen, who took over the homestead business in 2018, while the renovations were underway. Pullen is a military-trained steward, and after leaving the armed forces worked in a range of hospitality businesses before taking up the lease at Bushy Park.
