= Louis Hay =

New Zealand architect

James Augustus Louis Hay
- Born: January 14, 1881; Akaroa, Canterbury, New Zealand
- Died: February 4, 1948 (aged 67); Napier, Hawkes' Bay, New Zealand
- Occupation: Architect
- Style: Art Deco, Arts and Crafts, Art Nouveau
- Spouse: Margaret Ross Hay née McPherson
- Children: 1 daughter, 1 son
- Parents: James Hay (father); Frances Ann Gilchrist Greig (mother)

James Augustus Louis Hay (14 January 1881 – 4 February 1948) was a prominent New Zealand architect. He designed many new Art Deco buildings in Napier after the 1931 earthquake that had destroyed much of the town.

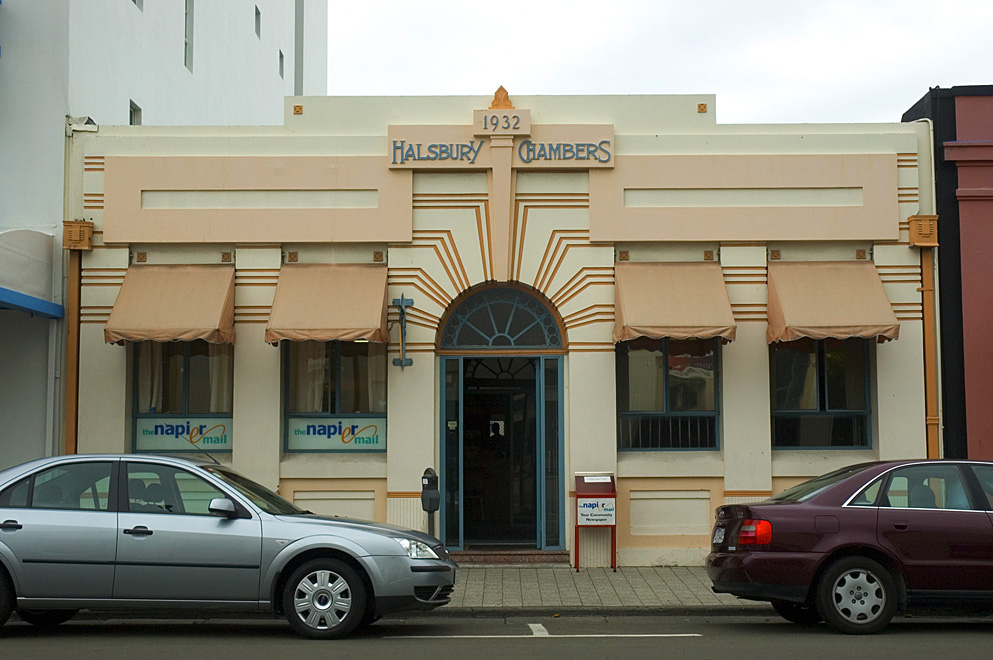
Halsbury Chambers, Napier.

== Early life ==
Louis was the eldest child and lived his early life in Lincoln, near Christchurch. In 1895, he moved with his family to Napier and attended Napier Boys' High School.

== Career ==
After leaving school, Hay worked for Charles Tilleard Natusch's architectural practice. His later work is influenced by his time spent with Natusch and his interest in Frank Lloyd Wright, the Arts and Crafts Movement and Art Nouveau.

In the early part of the 20th century, Hay set up his own practice doing mostly houses for wealthy Hawke's Bay residents. Although one of his best works was the National Tobacco Company building, initially completed in the 1920s.

After the event of the Napier earthquake in 1931 where his wife was severely injured, Hay joined the Napier Reconstruction Committee. He helped ensure that local architects had control over the large rebuilding task instead of architects from other parts of the country.

== Other activities ==
In Napier he was known not only for his architecture but for his other interests including boat building, waterskiing, acting and playing the flute.

== Noted works ==
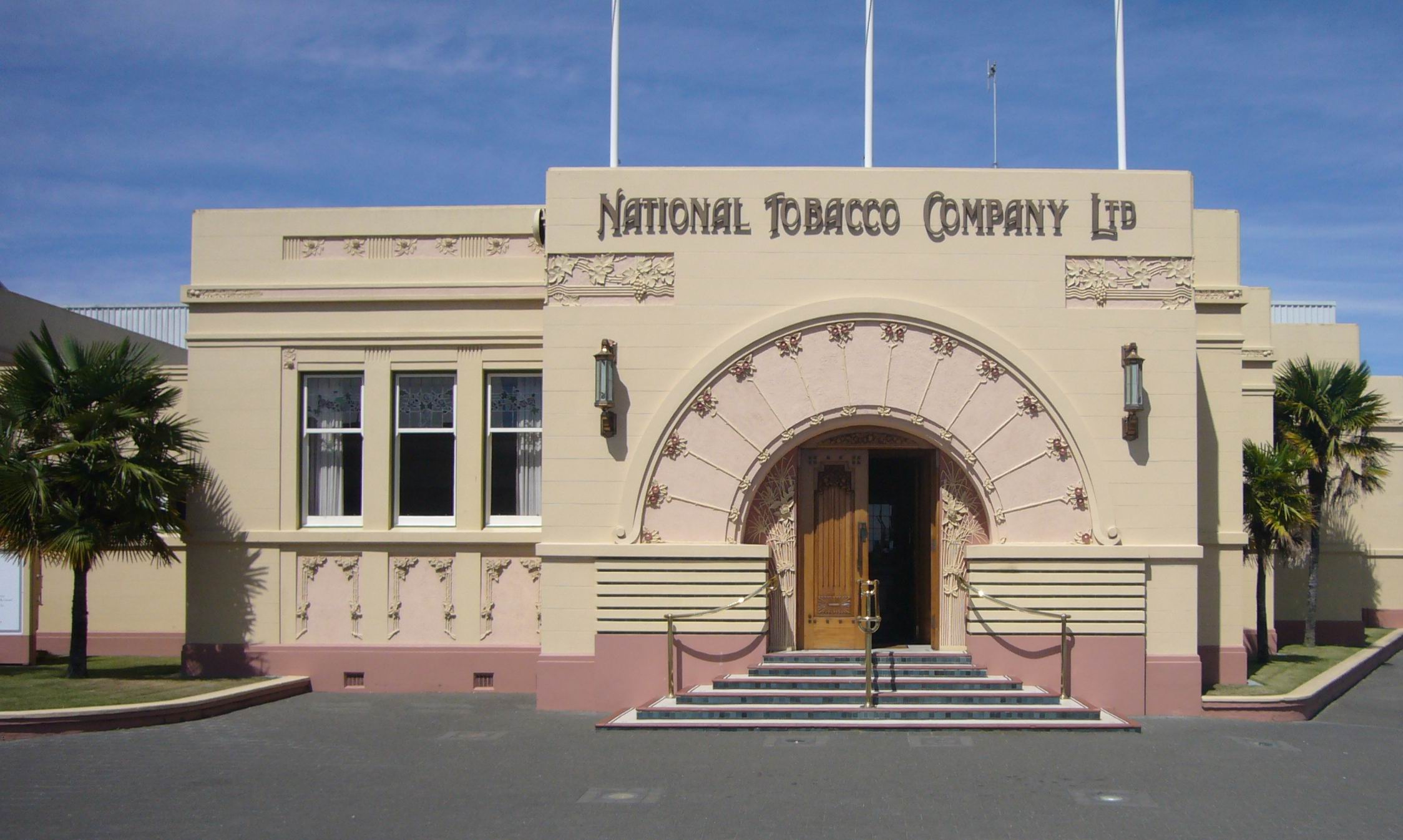
National Tobacco Company building, Napier (1933)

- 1915 Otatara, Taradale
- 1922 Central Fire Station, Napier
- 1925 Civic Centre, Napier
- 1931 McLean Park Pumping Station, Napier
- 1932 Hildebrandt-Building, Napier
- 1933 National Tobacco Company building, Napier
- 1933 AMP Building, Napier
- 1935 Hawke's Bay Art Gallery and Museum, Napier
- Former Fire Chief's House
- St. Paul's Presbyterian Church, Napier
- Abbotts Building, Napier
- Parkers Chambers, Napier
- Louis Hay Building, Napier
- NZI-Building, Napier
- Napier Club, Napier
- Hairy Cactus Restaurant, Napier
