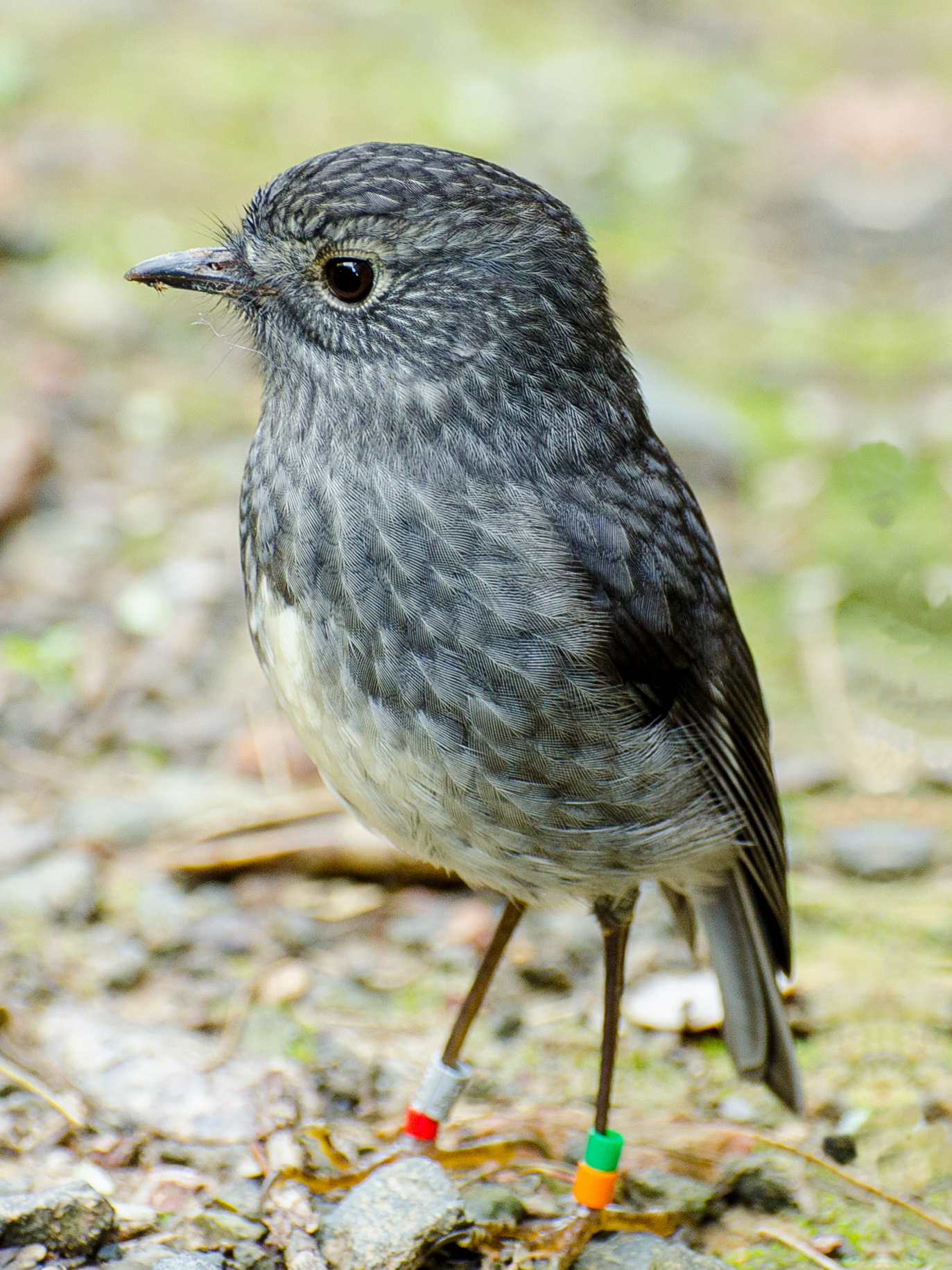

Conservation status
- Least Concern (IUCN 3.1)

Scientific classification
- Kingdom: Animalia
- Phylum: Chordata
- Class: Aves
- Order: Passeriformes
- Family: Petroicidae
- Genus: Petroica
- Species: P. longipes

Binomial name
- Petroica longipes (Lesson, RP & Garnot, 1827)

Synonyms
- Petroica australis longipes

Audio
- Recording of a North Island robin singing

= North Island robin =

Passerine species of bird native to New Zealand's North Island

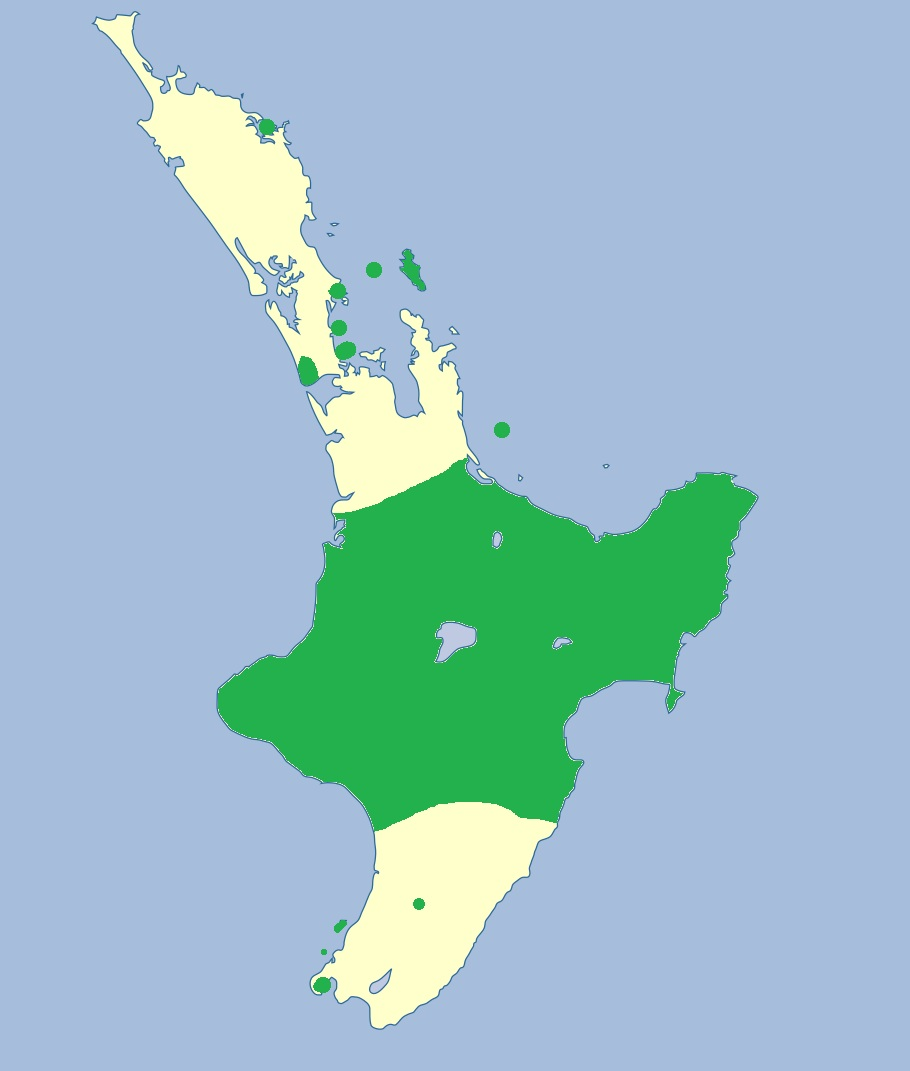
Approximate distribution of the North Island Robin.

The North Island robin (Petroica longipes; Māori: toutouwai, pronounced [ˈtoutouwai]) is a species of Australasian robin endemic to the North Island of New Zealand. It and the South Island robin (P. australis) of the South Island and Stewart Island were once considered conspecific (and called the "New Zealand robin"), but mitochondrial DNA sequences have shown that the two lineages split prior to the Pleistocene, and support the classification as two different species. The bird is a small, sexually dimorphic species with dark grey-black plumage and a pale area on its breast and belly. It is a terrestrial feeder, foraging on or near the ground for invertebrates and fruit.

== Description ==
The plumage is dark grey-black overall, with a pale area (smaller than that of the South Island robin) on the belly and breast, and pale streaking on the upperparts. At the base of their beaks is a hidden patch of white feathers that are occasionally "flashed" when interacting with other robins or similar sized birds. They are sexually dimorphic, with males having darker plumage than the females and being slightly larger.

== Distribution and habitat ==
The North Island robin is distributed mostly in the centre of the North Island, with small relict populations in the north and south, on Moturua Island in the Bay of Islands, Little Barrier Island, and Kapiti Island. Populations have been reestablished in the Zealandia sanctuary in Wellington, at Bushy Park near Whanganui, and at Moehau on the Coromandel Peninsula. A remnant population is also reestablishing itself in the Ōhope Scenic Reserve, near Whakatāne; 40 birds were translocated to the reserve from Mokoia Island to assist the population there. There are estimated to be more than 10,000 individuals.

Their natural habitat is mostly native forest, particularly Podocarpus and southern beech (Nothofagaceae) forests, from sea level up to the tree-line.

== Behaviour ==
=== Feeding ===
The North Island robin, like the South Island robin, is a terrestrial feeder foraging on or near the ground (unlike the related and more arboreal tomtit). Prey items are located by perch-hunting, where an individual waits at an elevated perch until prey is spotted, or by active searching; prey is taken from the leaf-litter, low vegetation (branches and foliage), and tree trunks. Numerous invertebrate prey are taken, including cicadas, earthworms, wētā, snails, and spiders. Fruit is also taken. The diet of the North Island robin includes some of the world's largest terrestrial invertebrates, leading them to cache excess food supplies when prey is too large to be consumed in one sitting or when prey is plentiful. Males tend to cache more food than females do. Both sexes will steal food from their mate's cache, and are less likely to cache food, if their mate is present. Other species are also known to steal caches.

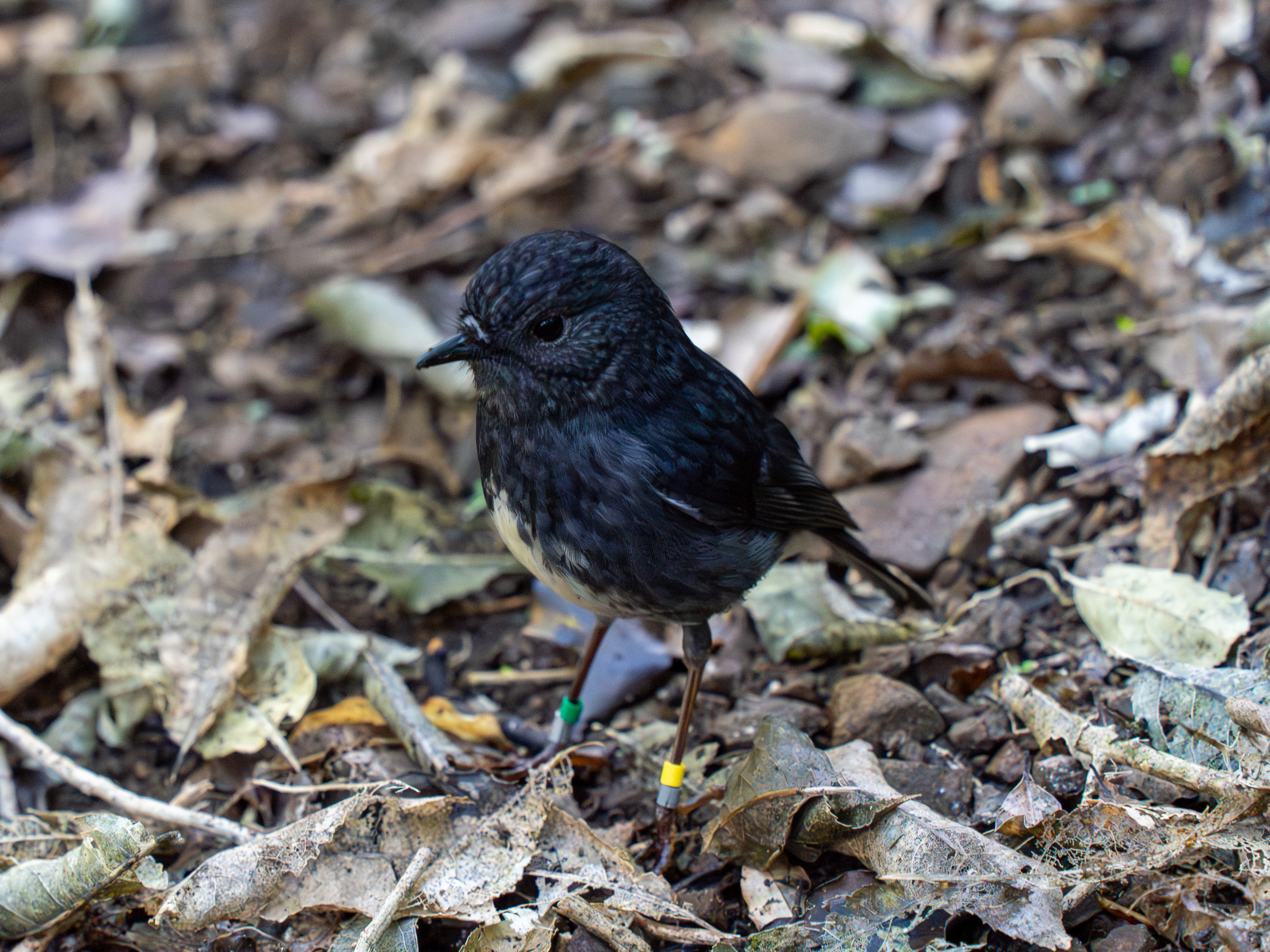
Robins forage through leaf litter to hunt for insects

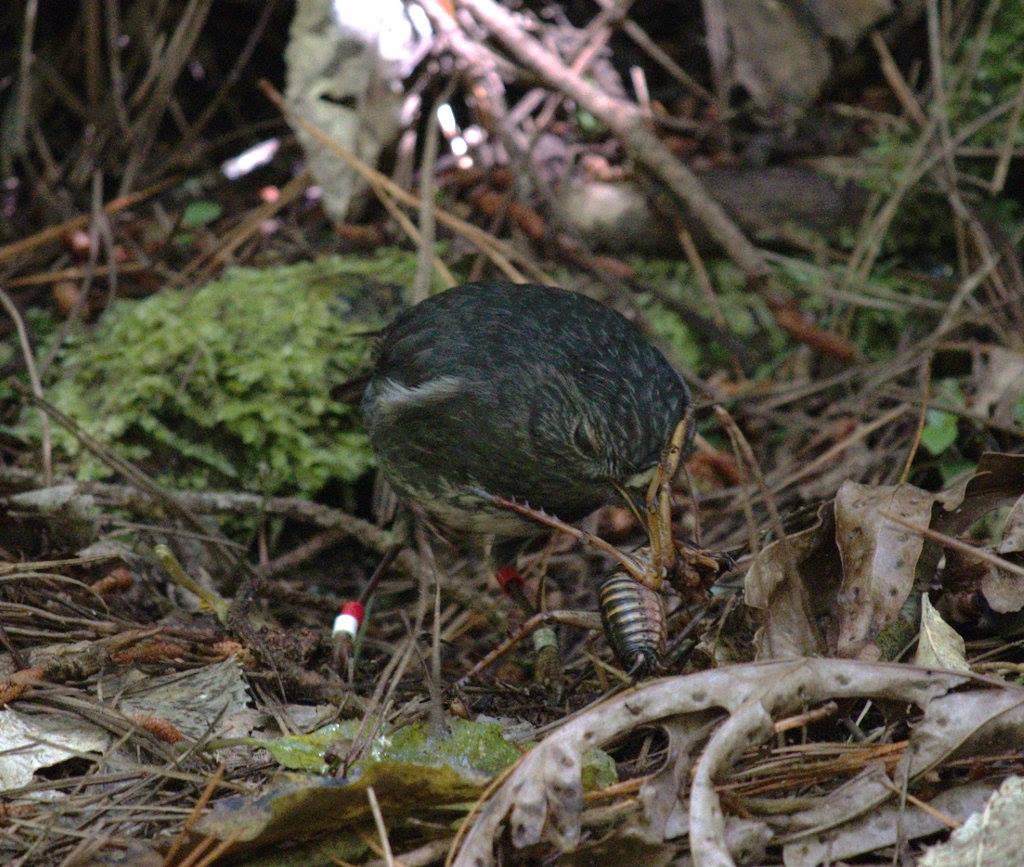
Robins eat a variety of invertebrates, including tree wētā

== Intelligence ==
North Island robins have been the subject of a plethora of behavioural and cognitive studies. North Island robins are bold and curious, often lacking fear towards people. They also remain motivated for food even after they are satiated, making them ideal subjects for testing behavioural and cognitive tasks. North Island robins have been shown to have adept numerical competency, spatial and long-term memory, and have shown that cognitive performance is linked to behaviour and reproductive success in the wild.

== Gallery ==
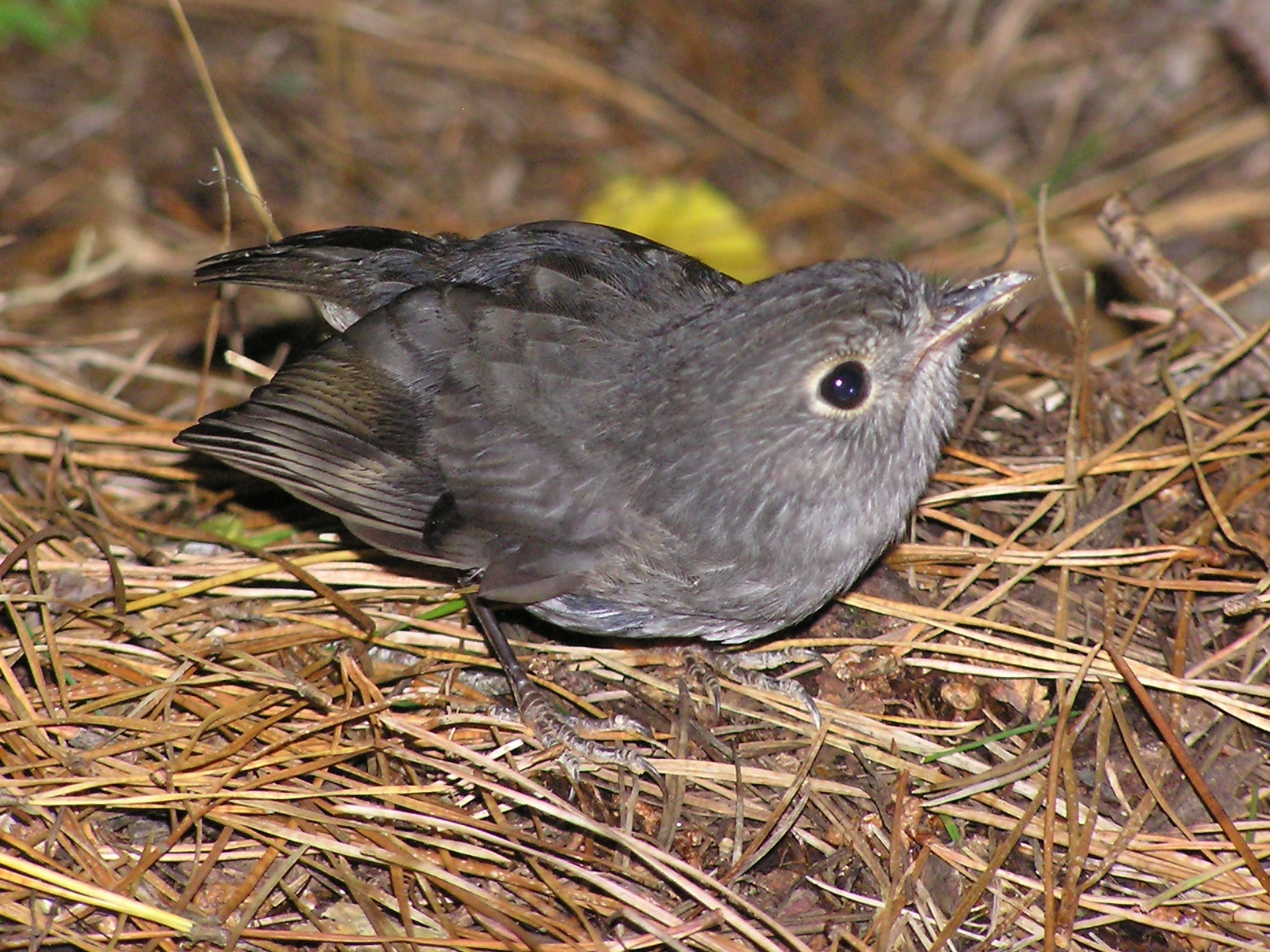
Juvenile begging for food.

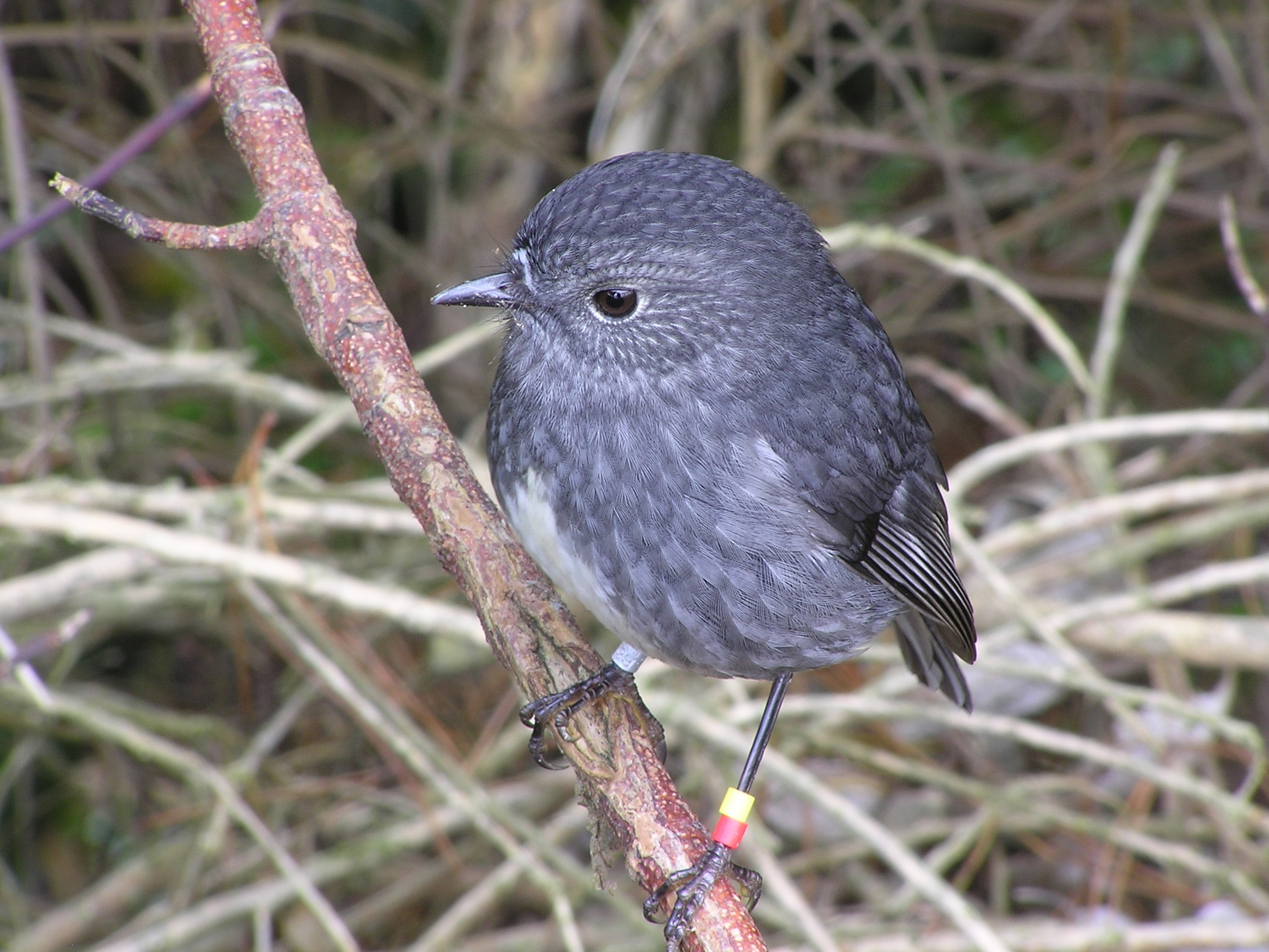
Standing perfectly still on a perch awaiting prey.

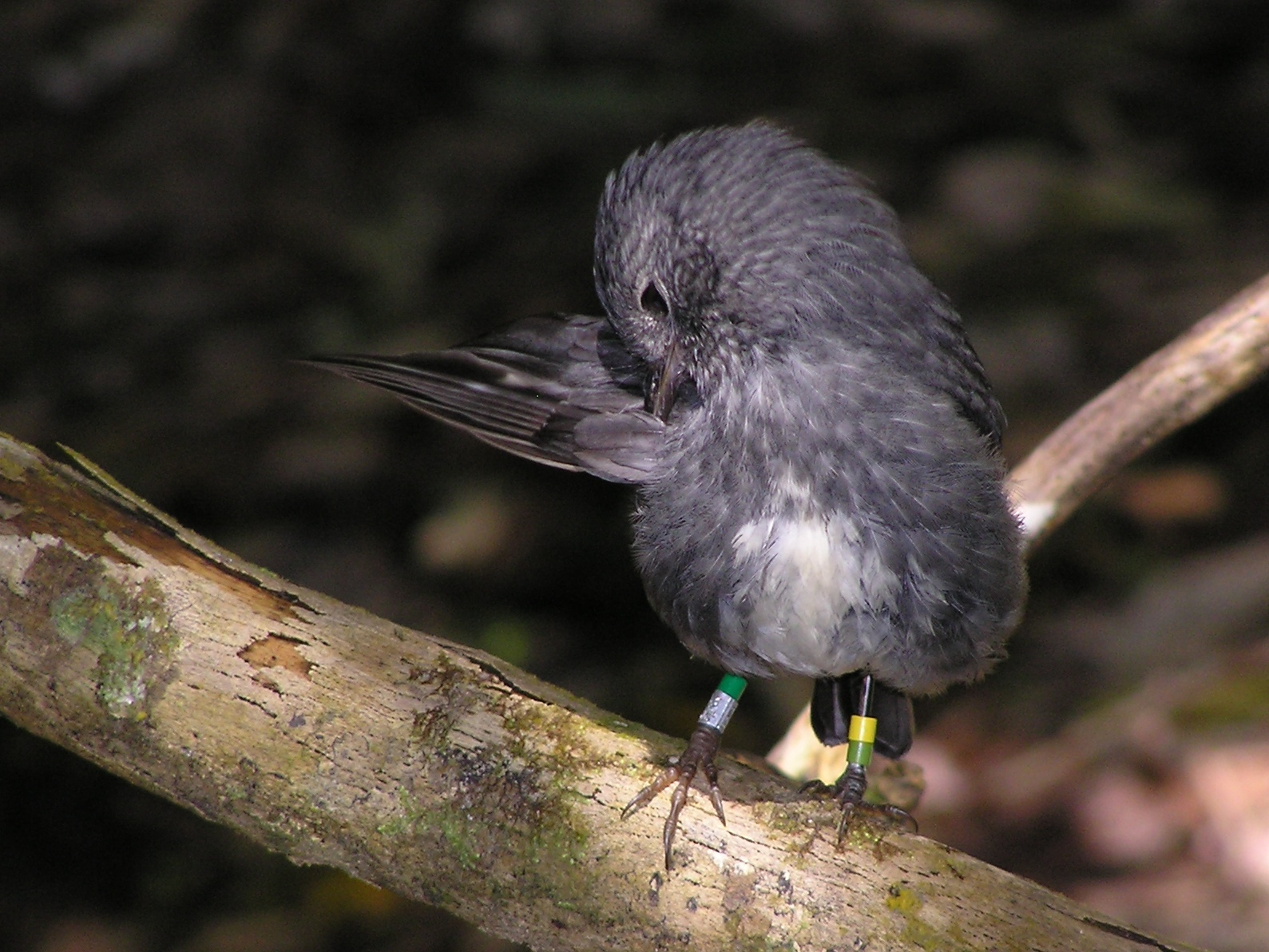
Preening.

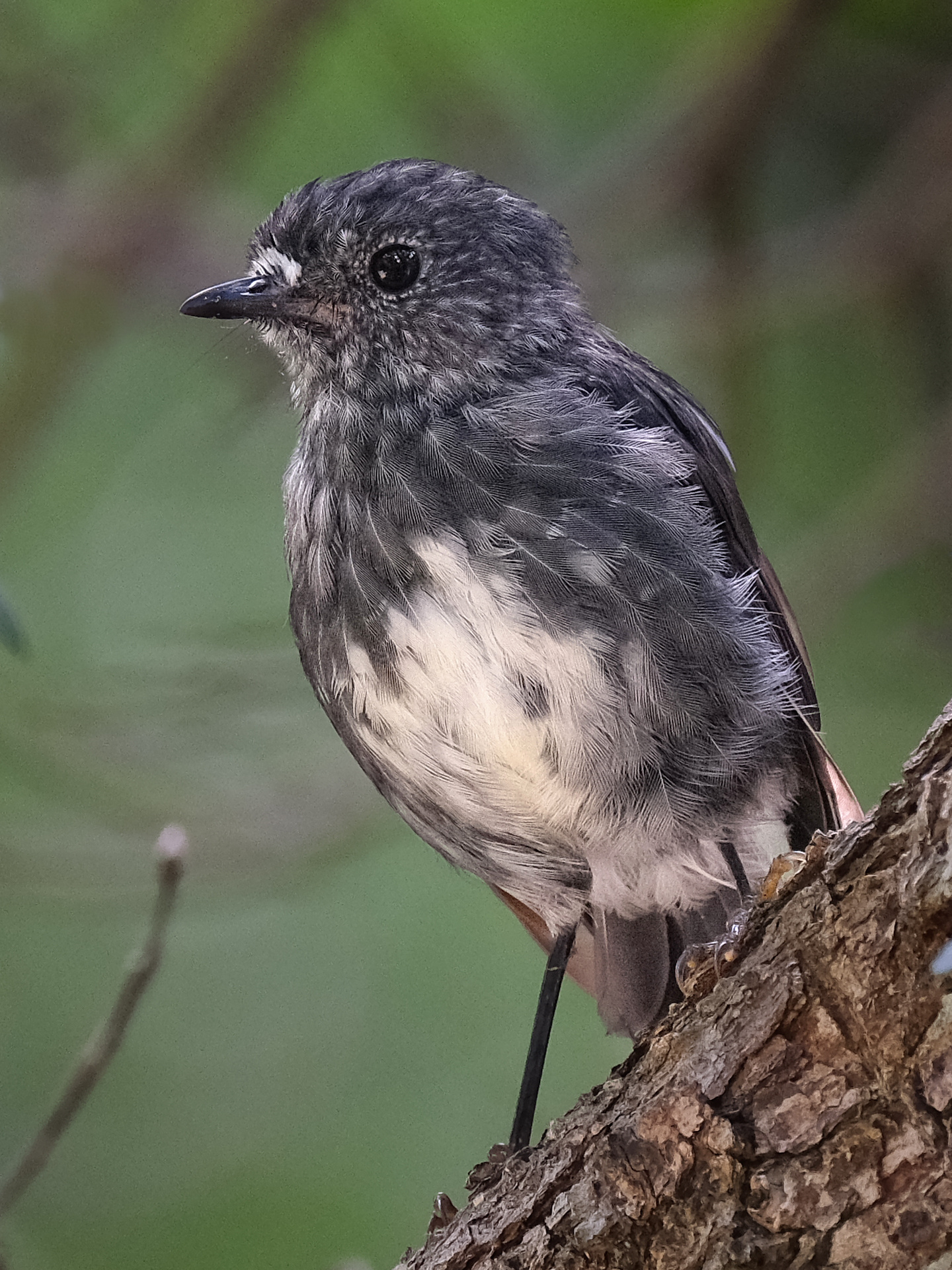
North Island Robin standing on a branch on Tiritiri Matangi Island.

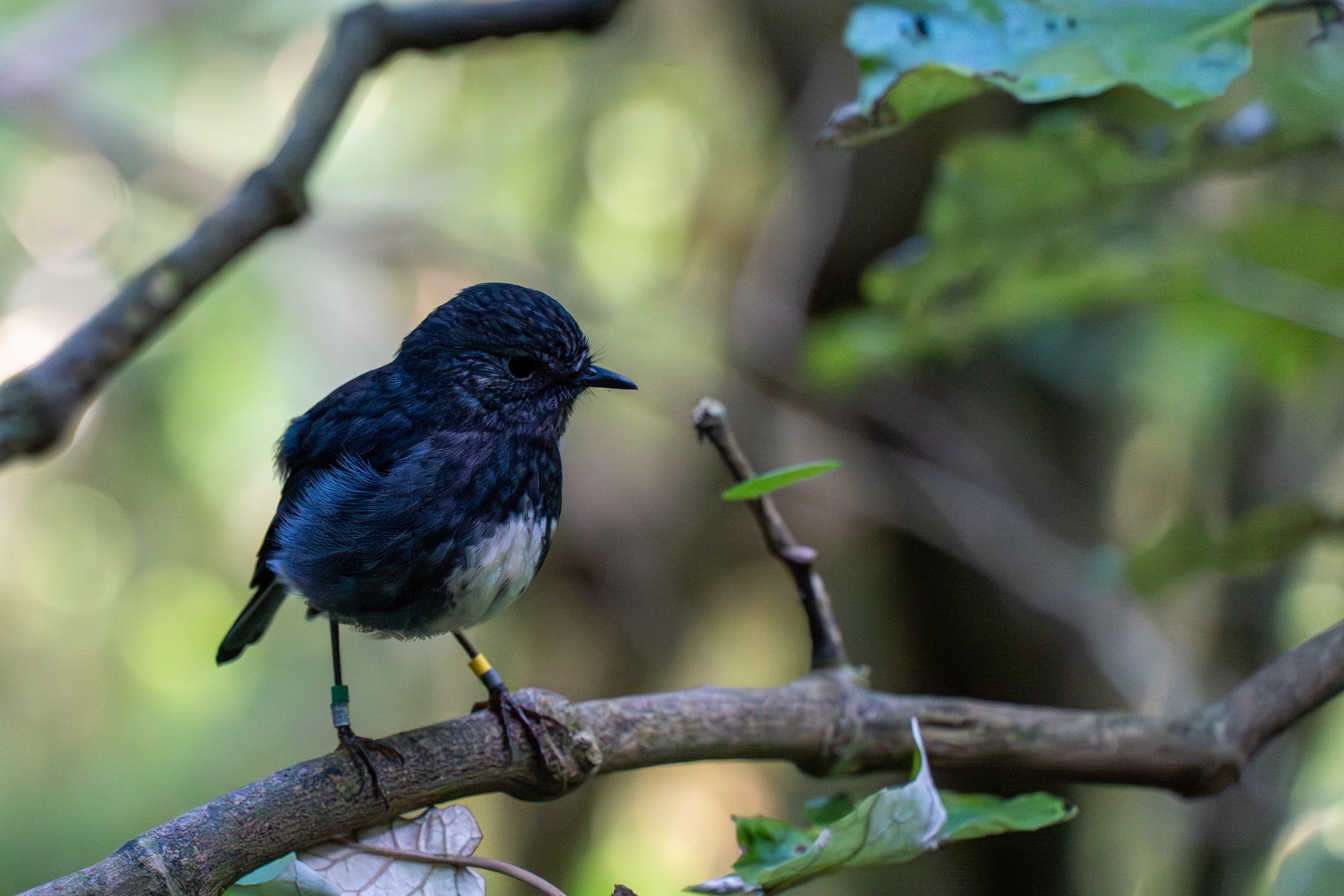
A robin perched in a tree.

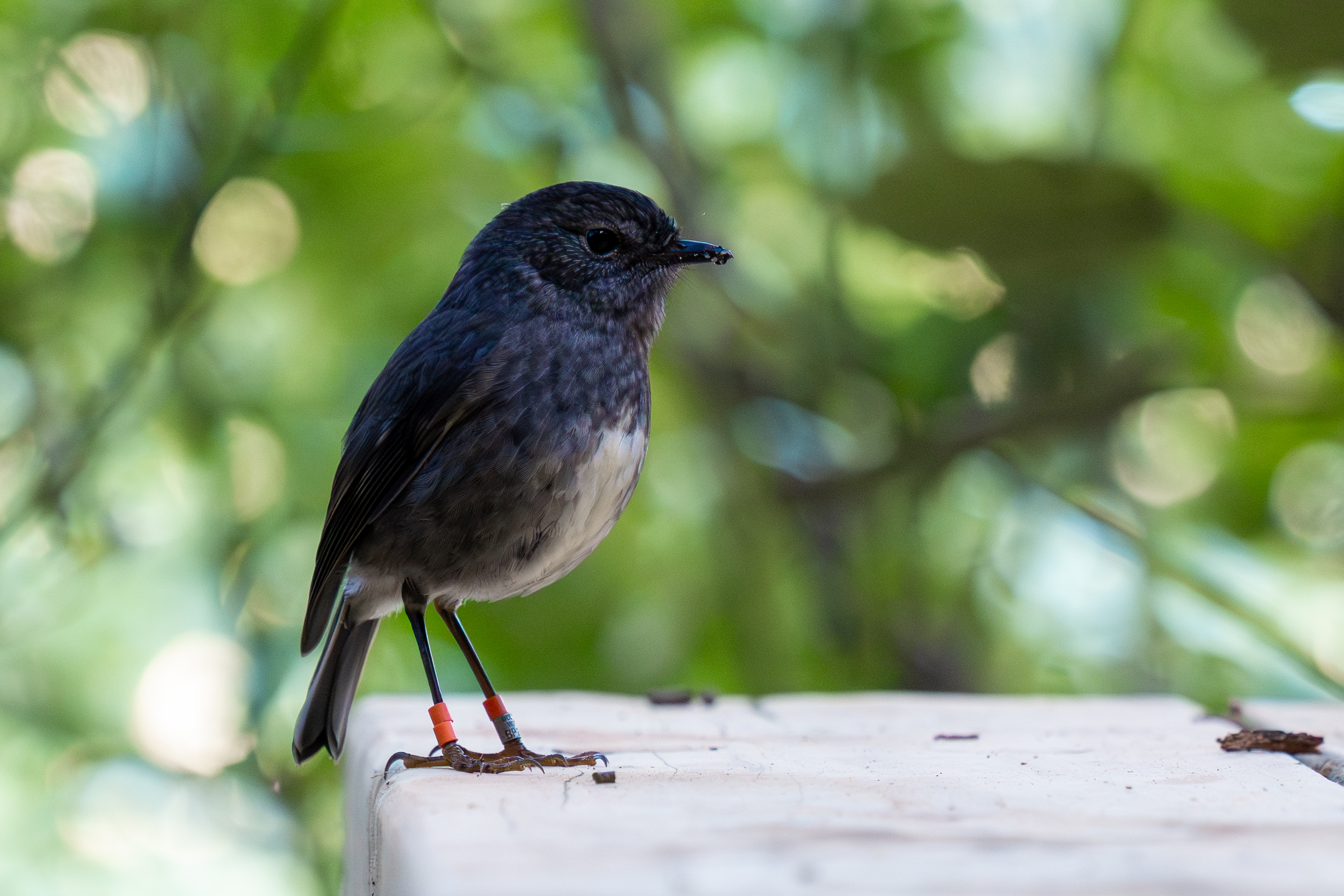
A North Island robin perched on a table at Zealandia Wildlife Sanctuary.

== See also ==
- List of New Zealand birds
