= Maungaraupi Homestead =

Homestead in Manawatū-Whanganui, New Zealand

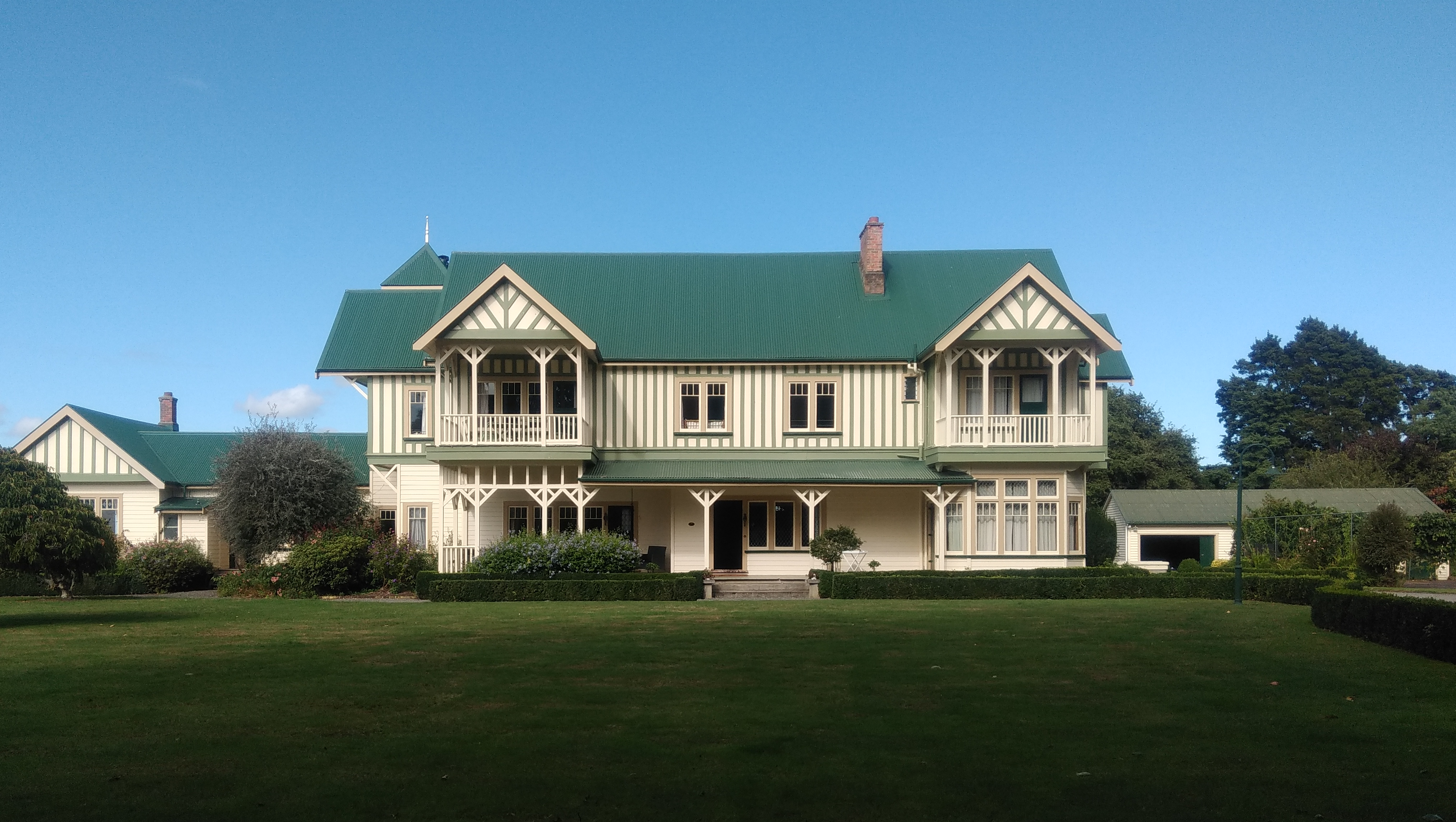
- Maungaraupi Homestead in 2018

General information
- Architectural style: Tudor style
- Location: 338 Leedstown Road, Marton, Manawatū-Whanganui
- Coordinates: 39°59′37″S 175°29′42″E
- Completed: 1906
- Cost: £3,000 ($653,811 NZD in 2025)

Design and construction
- Architect: Charles Tilleard Natusch

Heritage New Zealand – Category 1
- Designated: 2 July 1987
- Reference no.: 4916

Maungaraupi Homestead, also known as Maungaraupi Country Estate, is a Tudor Revival homestead with Elizabethan and Arts and Crafts influences, located near Marton in the Manawatū-Whanganui region of New Zealand. Built in 1906, it is an example of early 20th-century rural architecture and is registered as a Category 1 historic place by Heritage New Zealand. The estate spans 23 hectares and has been used as a family home, farm stay, and now as accommodation.

== Design and construction ==
The homestead was designed by English-born New Zealand architect Charles Tilleard Natusch (1859–1951) and constructed by local builder James McChesney of Marton at a cost of £3,000. Native timbers were seasoned for three years prior to use, including rimu for floors, walls, doors, and panelled ceilings; matai for floors and weatherboards; and totara for verandahs and supports. The roof is made of corrugated iron. The 836-square-metre structure features pronounced gables, external half-timbering on the upper stories, tall chimney stacks, and gabled balconies. Kapiti Island can be seen from the observation tower. Fixtures such as the fireplaces and wood-burning stove, are preserved from the initial homestead and maintain a period-appropriate interior.

== History ==
The Maungaraupi Estate originated in 1852 when English naturalist William John Swainson (1789–1855), a Fellow of the Royal Society known for his contributions to ornithology and botany, acquired land in the Rangitikei region after emigrating to New Zealand in 1841. The property, named after the nearby Maungaraupi Stream, was part of a network of Swainson family farms, including Te Hekenga approximately 50 km upriver. Early travel involved challenging journeys, such as crossing the Rangitikei River up to 41 times on horseback through dense native bush. The homestead was commissioned in 1906 by Swainson's grandson, William Swainson Marshall (1852–1926), often called Will, who managed Te Hekenga in the 1870s and was fluent in Te Reo Māori, aiding interactions with local iwi, including a notable 1875 tribal encounter. Marshall was a founding member of the Polynesian Society in 1892 and the son of Mary Frederica Swainson and Major John William Marshall, an early Rangitikei pioneer from the 65th Regiment. Prior to Maungaraupi, the family resided at Tutu Totara, about 16 km from Marton. In 1892, at age 39, Marshall married his 23-year-old cousin Elizabeth Hilda Addie Swainson (1868–1953), daughter of William John Swainson Jr. This intermarriage was common among settler families to consolidate land holdings. They raised eight children at the homestead. The property remained in the Marshall family until 1987. After 1987, it was operated as a farm stay by new owners Mr and Mrs Bruce Robertson of Palmerston North. A restoration in the 1980s preserved its original features.
