= Bushy Park (New Zealand) =

Forest reserve in North Island, New Zealand

Bushy Park Tarapuruhi
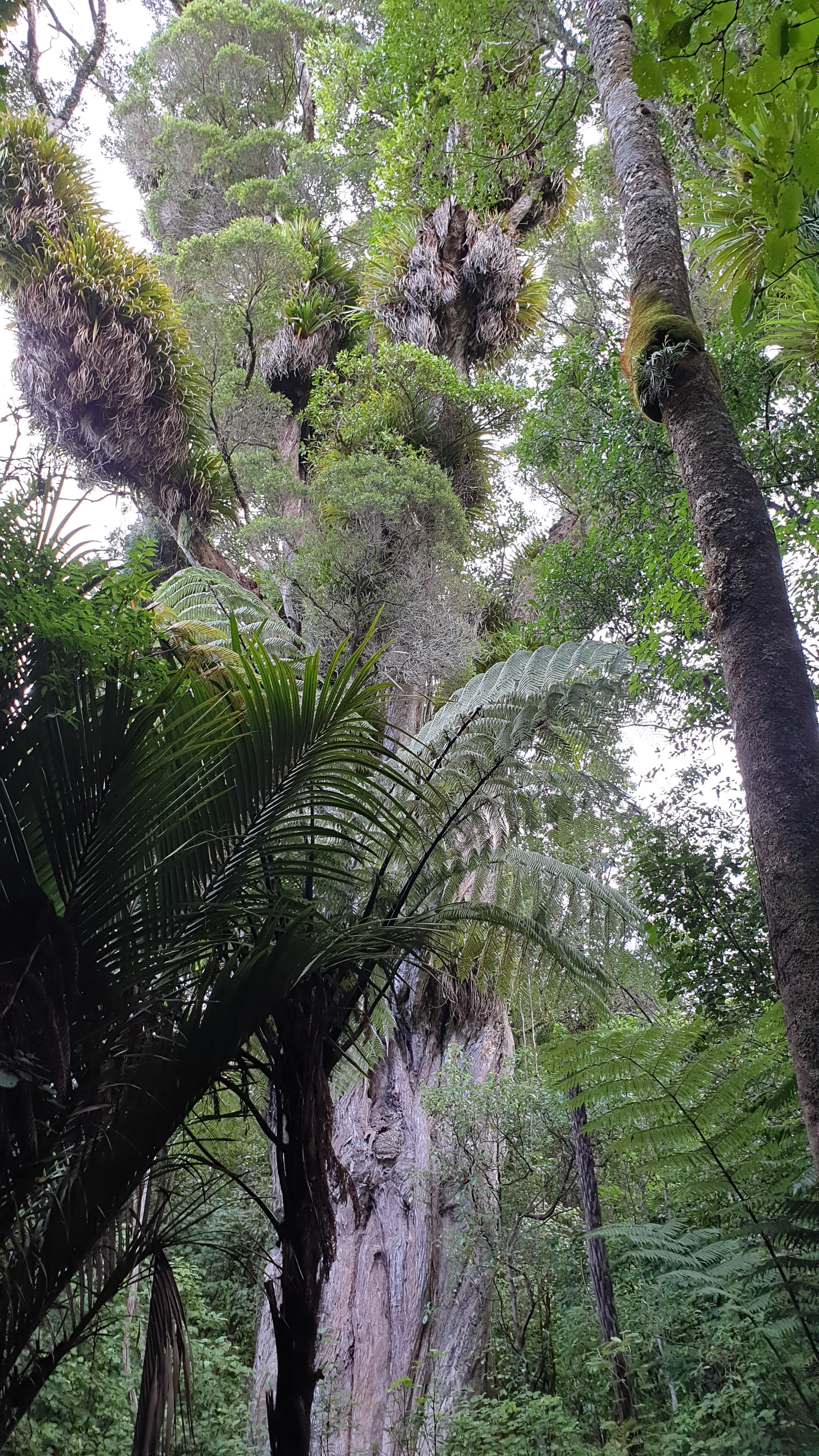
- Ratanui, a 43-metre-tall (141 ft) northern rātā, in Bushy Park
- Interactive map of Bushy Park Tarapuruhi
- Location: 791 Rangitatau East Road, Manawatū-Whanganui region, New Zealand
- Nearest city: Whanganui
- Coordinates: 39°47′50.4″S 174°55′43″E
- Area: 99 hectares (245 acres)
- Established: 1962
- Operator: Bushy Park Trust
- Website: bushypark.nz

Bushy Park (also known as Bushy Park Tarapuruhi) is a native forest reserve and bird sanctuary located in the Manawatū-Whanganui region of the North Island of New Zealand. The reserve is located eight kilometres (5.0 mi) inland from Kai Iwi and has an area of approximately 99 hectares (245 acres), including the Bushy Park Homestead and grounds. The forest has a diverse range of native plant species, with canopy trees including northern rātā, rimu, tawa, and pukatea. In 1962, the forest was gifted to the Royal Forest and Bird Protection Society of New Zealand by the former owner G. F. Moore, along with the homestead and its surrounds. The reserve is now managed by the Bushy Park Trust, in partnership with Forest & Bird and local iwi Ngā Rauru Kītahi. The forest reserve and homestead were renamed as Bushy Park Tarapuruhi in 2019.

Following installation of a pest-exclusion fence and eradication of rats and possums in 2005, the reserve is managed as a mainland island (or ecological island). The reserve has been judged as being amongst the 25 best ecological restoration projects in Australia and New Zealand. Several native bird species have been re-introduced, including North Island robin, North Island saddleback, stitchbird, whitehead and rifleman. The populations of North Island robin and saddleback in the reserve have increased to the extent that Bushy Park has been used as a source for translocation of birds to other sanctuary areas.

A feature of the reserve is a large northern rātā named Ratanui (big rātā) that is estimated to be 1,000 years old. The reserve is open to the public, and there are tracks giving access through the forest. Educational facilities have been established at the reserve, and around 2,000 school children visit the sanctuary each year.

== History ==
In 1880, an area of 391 hectares (966 acres) inland from Kai Iwi was sold by a Māori chief, Uru Te Angina to James Moore for £483. Moore established a large farm on the estate and his son Frank Moore became known as a breeder of cattle and horses. However, a 99 hectares (245 acres) remnant of native lowland forest was preserved, and this is now the Bushy Park Tarapuruhi reserve. The forest reserve and the homestead, built for Frank Moore in 1906, were bequeathed to the Royal Forest and Bird Protection Society of New Zealand by Moore upon his death in 1962.

Between 1981 and 1984, the national Forest & Bird organisation debated the economic viability of continued involvement in the Bushy Park homestead and grounds. However, in 1985, the Forest & Bird Council confirmed that they would continue to own the homestead and promote its use. In 1988, a bunkhouse was constructed behind the homestead, adjacent to the stables, to provide additional accommodation on site. In 1994, the homestead and grounds were transferred to the Bushy Park Homestead and Forest Trust, later renamed as the Bushy Park Trust. Responsibility for managing the homestead and grounds was transferred to the members of the trust in 1995.

A 4.8-kilometre (3.0 mi) pest-exclusion fence around the reserve was completed in May 2005, and two aerial drops of rodent bait occurred later that year. The sanctuary was declared predator-free in 2006 and is now a mainland island (or ecological island). A secondary predator fence was subsequently constructed to enclose approximately eight hectares (20 acres) of open space and wetlands surrounding the homestead, as a defence against rats and mice that could enter in vehicles visiting the homestead and adjacent buildings. The opening of Bushy Park's kiwi crèche in 2005 was marked by the arrival of a female kiwi chick from the Waimarino Forest.

A celebration of the centenary of the Bushy Park reserve was held on 27–28 October 2006. In 2009, Bushy Park was judged as being one of the top 25 ecological restoration projects in Australasia. In 2014, there was an incursion of rats into the sanctuary. The Bushy Park trust mobilised volunteers to assist with predator control to eliminate the rats, but also announced their intention to seek funding for a paid full-time staff.

The forest reserve and homestead were renamed Bushy Park Tarapuruhi in 2019. The meaning of tarapuruhi in the Māori language is "place of abundant bird life". In 2020, work began to extend the forest reserve by retiring a two-hectare (4.9-acre) paddock that had been leased out for grazing, and restoring it with plants sourced from within the reserve. In 2022, a further project commenced to revegetate an area of four hectares (9.9 acres) of paddock within the sanctuary boundary. The project was expected to take between three and five years, and required the expansion of the sanctuary's plant nursery and shadehouses. In 2023, Bushy Park Tarapuruhi was chosen as one of three venues for a national celebration of the centenary of the founding of the Forest & Bird Protection Society.

In April 2025, a tree fell over the pest exclusion fence in a storm, and evidence was found of rat incursion into the sanctuary. An emergency response was mobilised to trap any predators that had entered the sanctuary. In June 2025, the Bush Park Tarapuruhi Trust received a grant of $100,000 for the establishment of a walkway focussing on rongoā (traditional Māori medicine). The scope of work includes an accessible pathway, a board walk and a composting toilet.

== Management ==
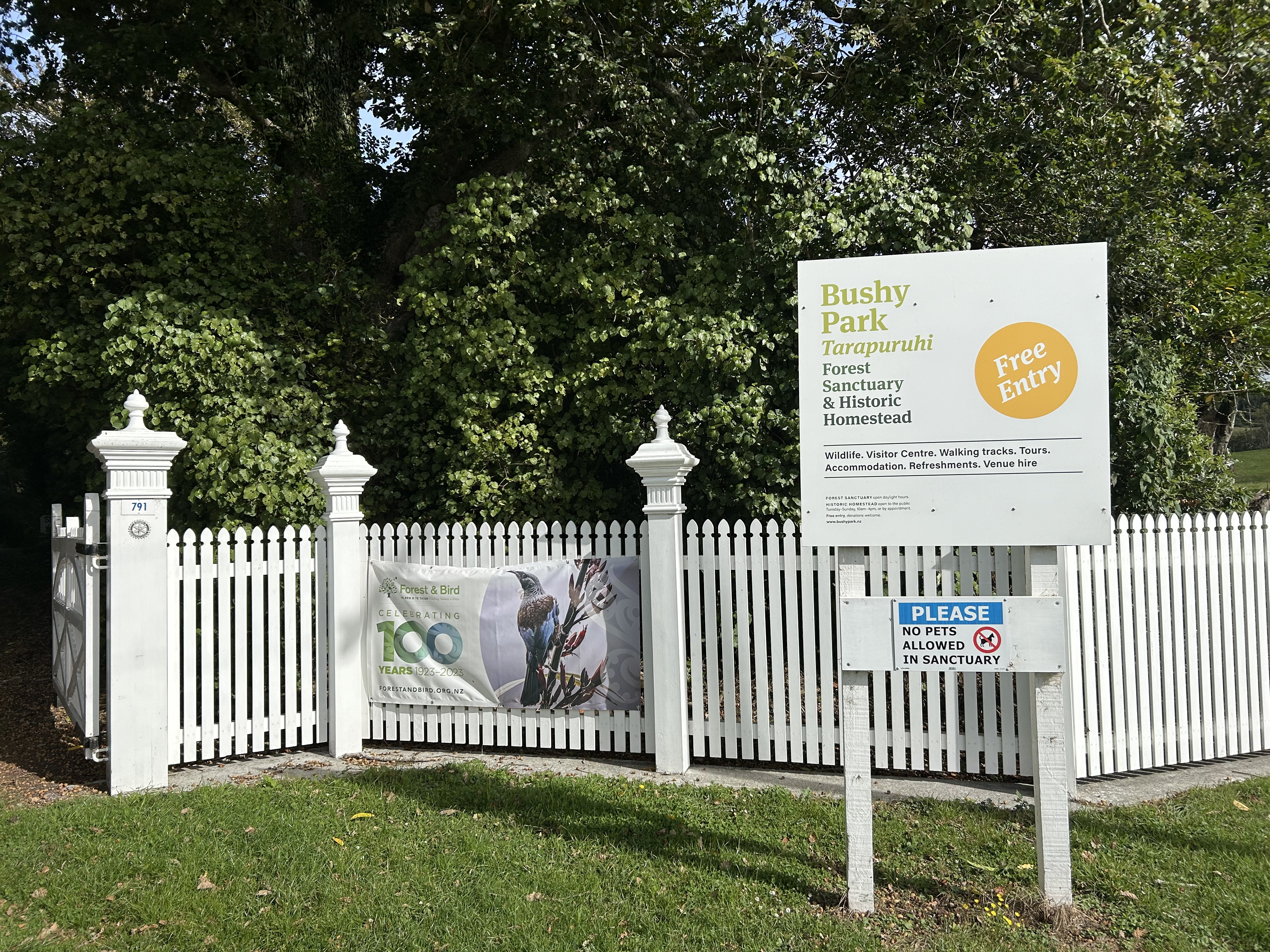
Entrance to Bushy Park Tarapuruhi

The title to the forest reserve and bird sanctuary has been retained by Forest & Bird, but the sanctuary area is leased to the Bushy Park Trust. Management of the reserve is via a partnership between the Bushy Park Trust, Forest & Bird and the local iwi Ngā Rauru Kītahi. The homestead and its surrounds have been owned and managed by the Bushy Park Trust since 1995. As of 2024, Forest & Bird pays the salary of sanctuary manager, and volunteers donate 500–600 hours per month working in the reserve. Volunteers undertake regular checks of the pest-exclusion fence, maintain tracks and manage weeds in the reserve. Other volunteer work includes raising plants in the on-site nursery.

Mice have never been eliminated from the sanctuary, and regular pest management is required to keep their numbers under control. There are 508 tracking tunnels in place across the reserve, and these are monitored to determine when additional pest management is needed. Pest animal control is also undertaken in an area of 600 hectares (1,500 acres) surrounding the sanctuary fence. This is known as the Bushy Park Tarapuruhi halo project and is funded by a Department of Conservation Community Fund and Horizons Regional Council. The project seeks to improve the chances of survival of birds that move outside the boundaries of the sanctuary.

Funding is obtained from multiple sources, including Horizons Regional Council. The Bushy Park Festival, an annual event on the Sunday of Wellington Anniversary weekend, has been a major fundraising event for the trust. As of 2024 the sanctuary has free entry.

== Flora ==
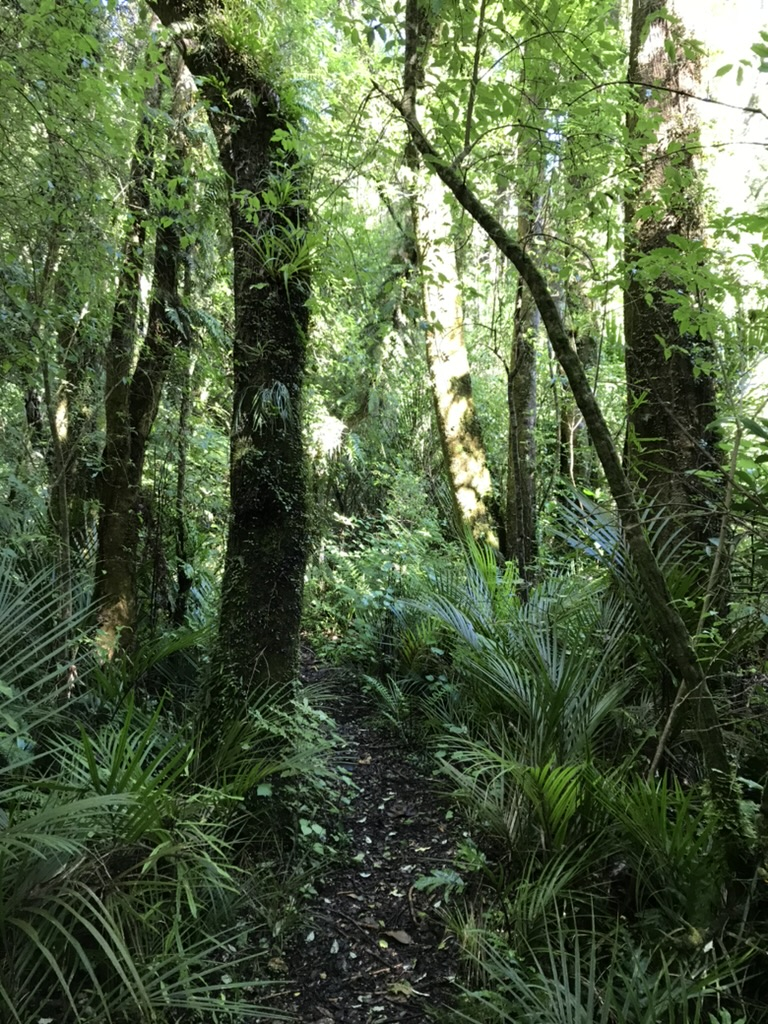
Bushy Park forest with young nīkau palms (Rhopalostylis sapida)

The reserve is a remnant of temperate lowland forest and is surrounded by pasture land. The upper canopy in the reserve consists of trees such as northern rātā, mataī, miro, kahikatea, tōtara, rimu, hīnau, tawa, and pukatea. The large number of pukatea is a particular feature of the reserve. The canopy trees support a wide range of ephiphytes including astelia, ferns and orchids, along with climbing plants such as rātā, clematis, New Zealand passionfruit and supplejack. The sub-canopy of the forest includes nīkau palms and tree ferns such as mamaku, along with tarata, kohukohu, tīkoki and rewarewa.

The third layer within the forest contains plants adapted to growing in reduced-light conditions with a cooler and more humid environment. These include juvenile forms of the canopy trees along with smaller tree ferns, māhoe, comprosma species, kawakawa, five-finger, rangiora, pigeonwood, and kōtukutuku (tree fuchsia). The forest floor supports a wide range of plants that can survive in damp, low light conditions, including ferns, umbrella moss, lichens, liverworts, fungi, ground-dwelling orchids and tree seedlings.

A major visitor attraction in the reserve is a large northern rātā named Ratanui (big rātā). The tree is estimated to be 1,000 years old. It is 43 metres (141 ft) in height and its girth exceeds 11 metres (36 ft). Prior to the establishment of the pest-exclusion fence, the tree was severely damaged by possums. This tree featured in an international writing project called 26 Trees.

Surveys of the flora in the reserve have identified around 160 native species. This is a smaller species count than might be found in other comparable forest remnants. A possible explanation is that there was some stock grazing within the forest until it was fully fenced in 1951. Prior to the elimination of rats and possums in 2005, browsing by possums had caused severe damage to northern rātā and depletion of species such as wineberry and tree fuchsia. However, the health of the forest has since recovered. There had been minimal logging in the forest.

== Fauna ==
Common native bird species that may be found in the reserve include kererū, bellbird (korimako) and tūī, as well as the fantail (pīwakawaka), grey warbler (riroriro), silvereye (tauhou) and pūkeko. Avian predators such as the New Zealand falcon (kārearea) and the white-faced heron (matuku moana) can also be seen.

Some endemic bird species have been translocated into the reserve to assist with increasing their distribution and total population. North Island robin (toutouwai) were introduced to the sanctuary in 2000, with an initial population of 28 birds. An additional 12 females and six males were added in 2004. By 2019, the population was estimated at 600 birds. The increase in the population of North Island robins has been associated with decreases in the occurrence of grey warbler, silvereye and fantail. Tomits have remained at only low numbers in the reserve. A possible explanation is that these species are unable to compete successfully with the introduced birds. North Island saddleback (tīeke) from Mokoia Island were introduced in 2006, starting with 34 birds. By 2016, the population had increased to more than 400.

The populations of North Island robin and saddleback in the Bushy Park reserve have increased to the extent that relocations to other sanctuary areas have been undertaken. In 2014, 40 North Island saddleback were translocated from Bushy Park to the 230-hectare (570-acre) Lake Rotokare fenced sanctuary in Taranaki. In 2017, 40 North Island robins were translocated from Bushy Park to Lake Rotokare. A further 40 North Island robins were translocated in 2021 from Bushy Park to the Turitea Reserve in Palmerston North.

The endemic stitchbird (hihi) has a conservation status of 'nationally vulnerable'. Fifty birds were introduced to the sanctuary in 2013. In 2018, ten hihi were translocated from Tiritiri Matangi Island to Bushy Park to increase the genetic diversity. The breeding success of hihi at Bushy Park has varied between 14 and 48 chicks fledged each season. Volunteers conduct weekly checks of nest boxes and supply sugar-water to supplementary feeding stations. Over 1,000 volunteer-hours were spent on supporting hihi during 2020. The 2020–2021 hihi breeding season was particularly successful, and the number of females in the sanctuary doubled to 16.

In May 2022, a flock of 52 whiteheads (pōpokotea) was translocated from Waitahinga Reserve to Bushy Park. In April 2023, around 60 rifleman (titipounamu) were translocated from Taranaki Mounga to Bushy Park in an arrangement facilitated by the local hapū of Taranaki Maunga.

Birds of Bushy Park

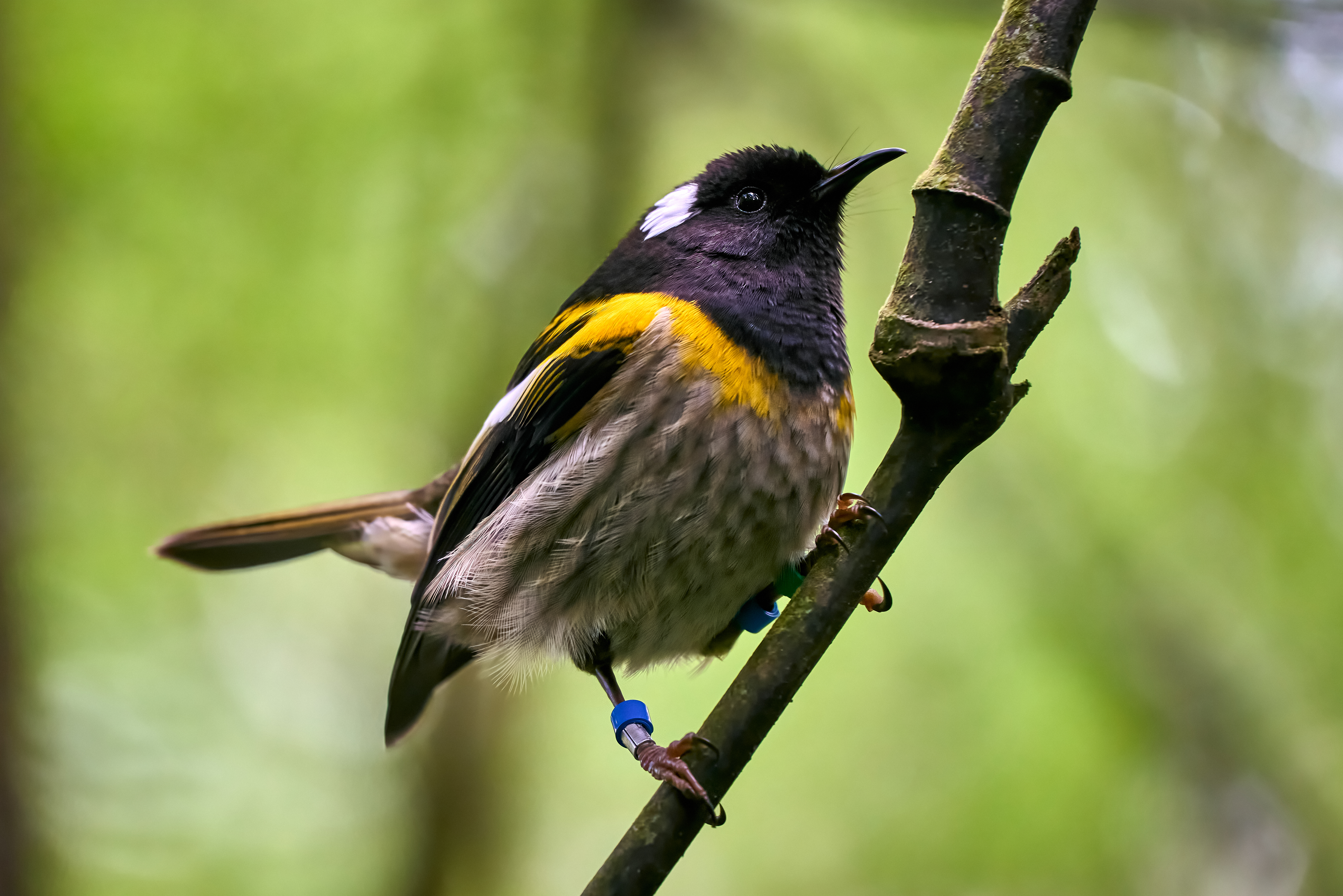
Male stitchbird (hihi)

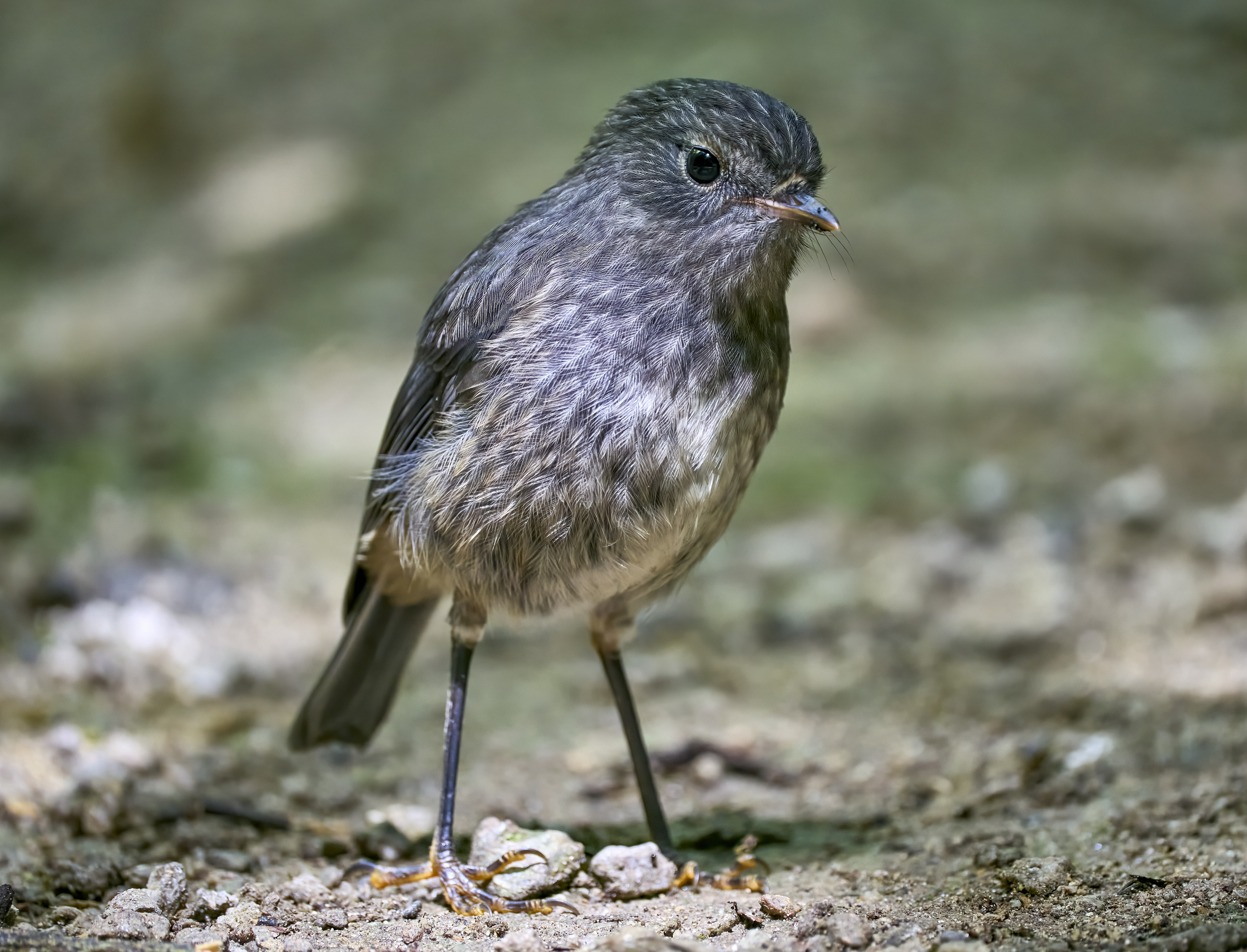
North Island robin (toutouwai)

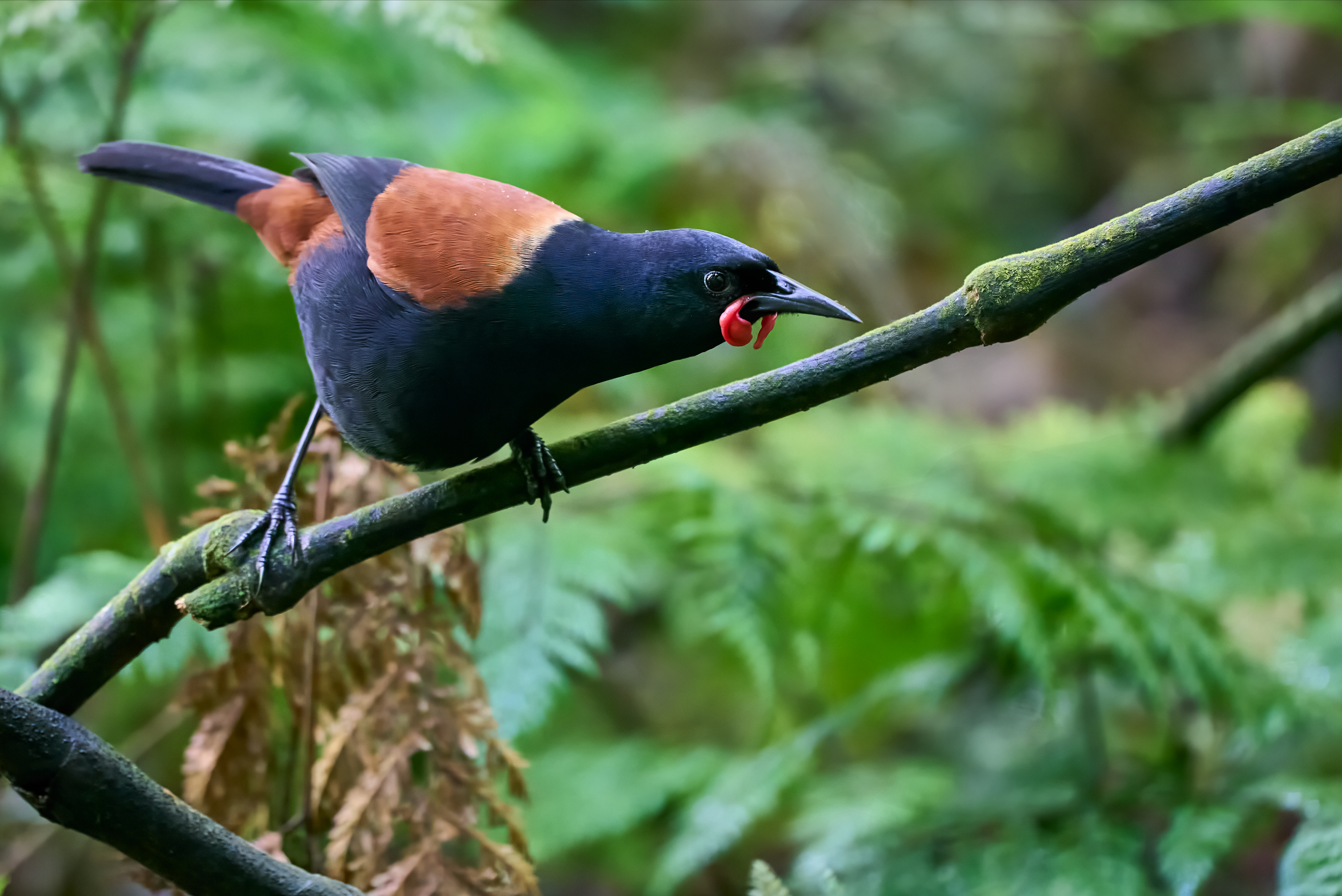
North Island saddleback (tīeke)

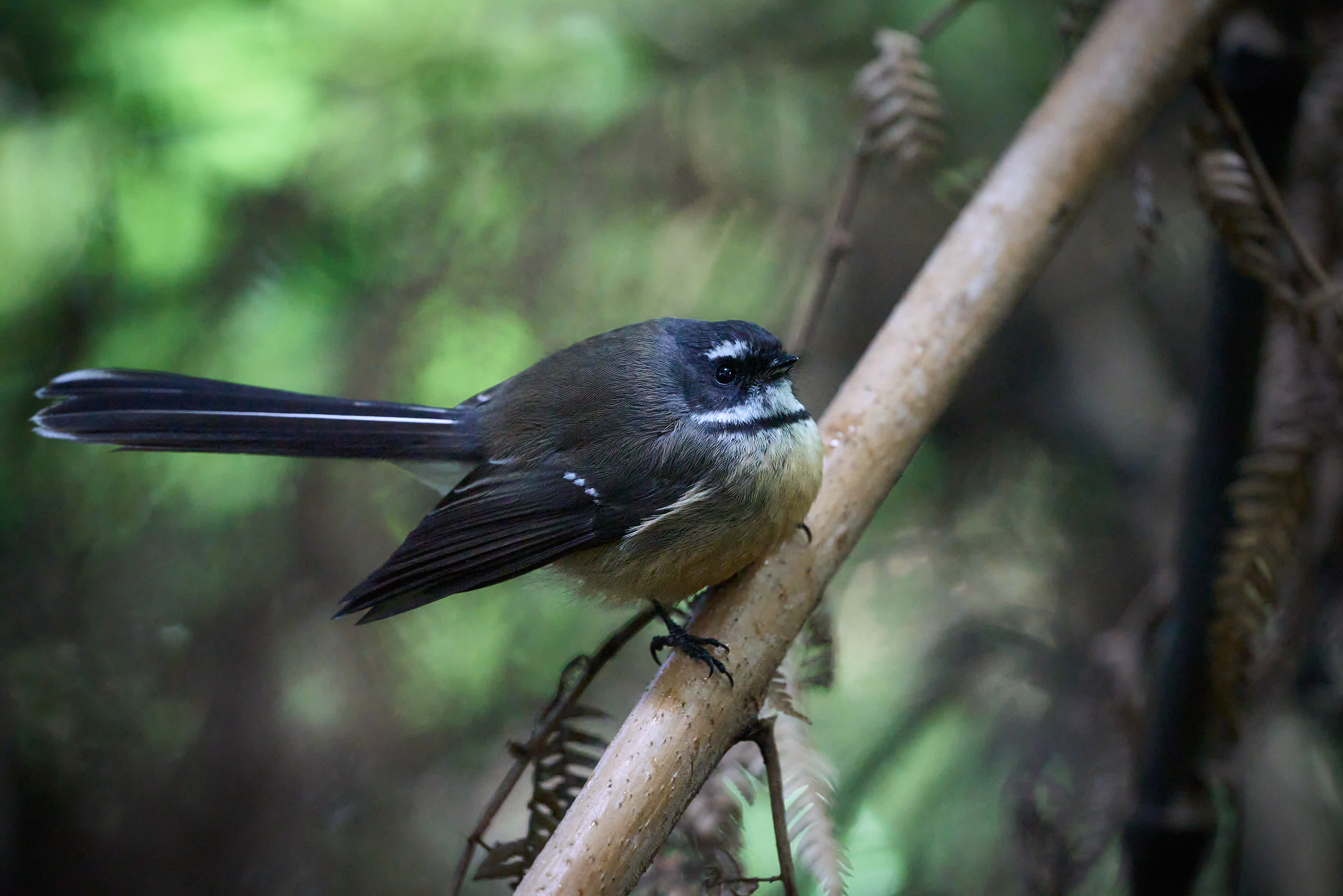
New Zealand fantail (pīwakawaka)

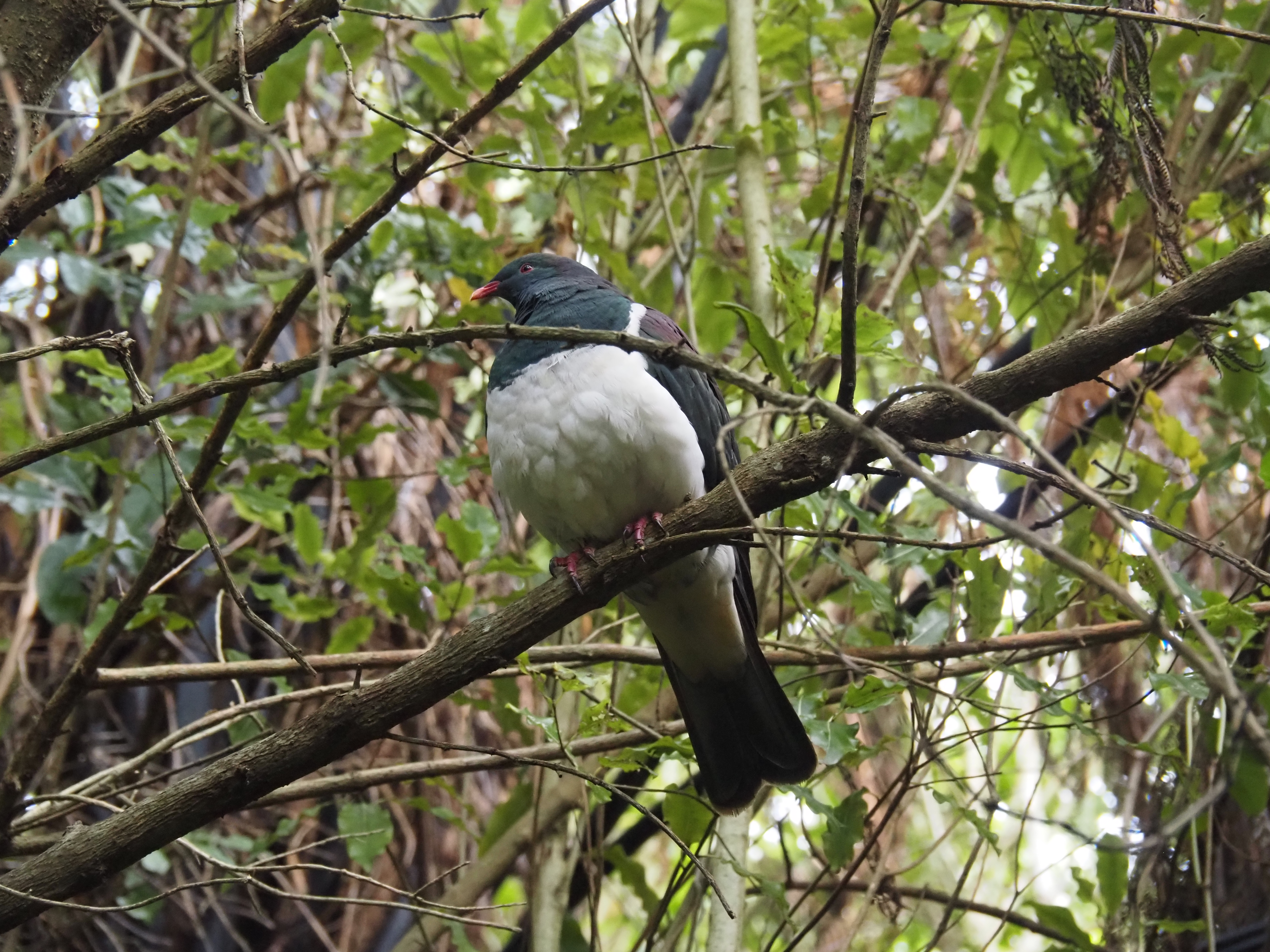
Kererū

Giraffe weevils, glowworms, and huhu beetles are also found in Bushy Park. In 2016, a 24-hour bioblitz was held at Bushy Park to gain more understanding of the invertebrates living in the sanctuary.

== Homestead ==
The reserve includes a 22-room Edwardian-era homestead built in 1906 that is registered as a Category 1 historic place with Heritage New Zealand. The Bushy Park Trust leases the homestead to proprietors to operate a business, offering accommodation and a venue for events.

== Visitor centre ==
A visitor centre was opened in 2019. It was constructed in former stables behind the homestead, and includes an interpretation centre, a space for exhibiting historic items, and toilet facilities. The heritage displays in the visitor centre include a horse tack room with equipment used in bridling horses, and the quarters for the groom. It also includes the generator that powered the homestead before the arrival of mains electricity. Other facilities for visitors include a network of ten paths through the forest reserve.

== Education ==
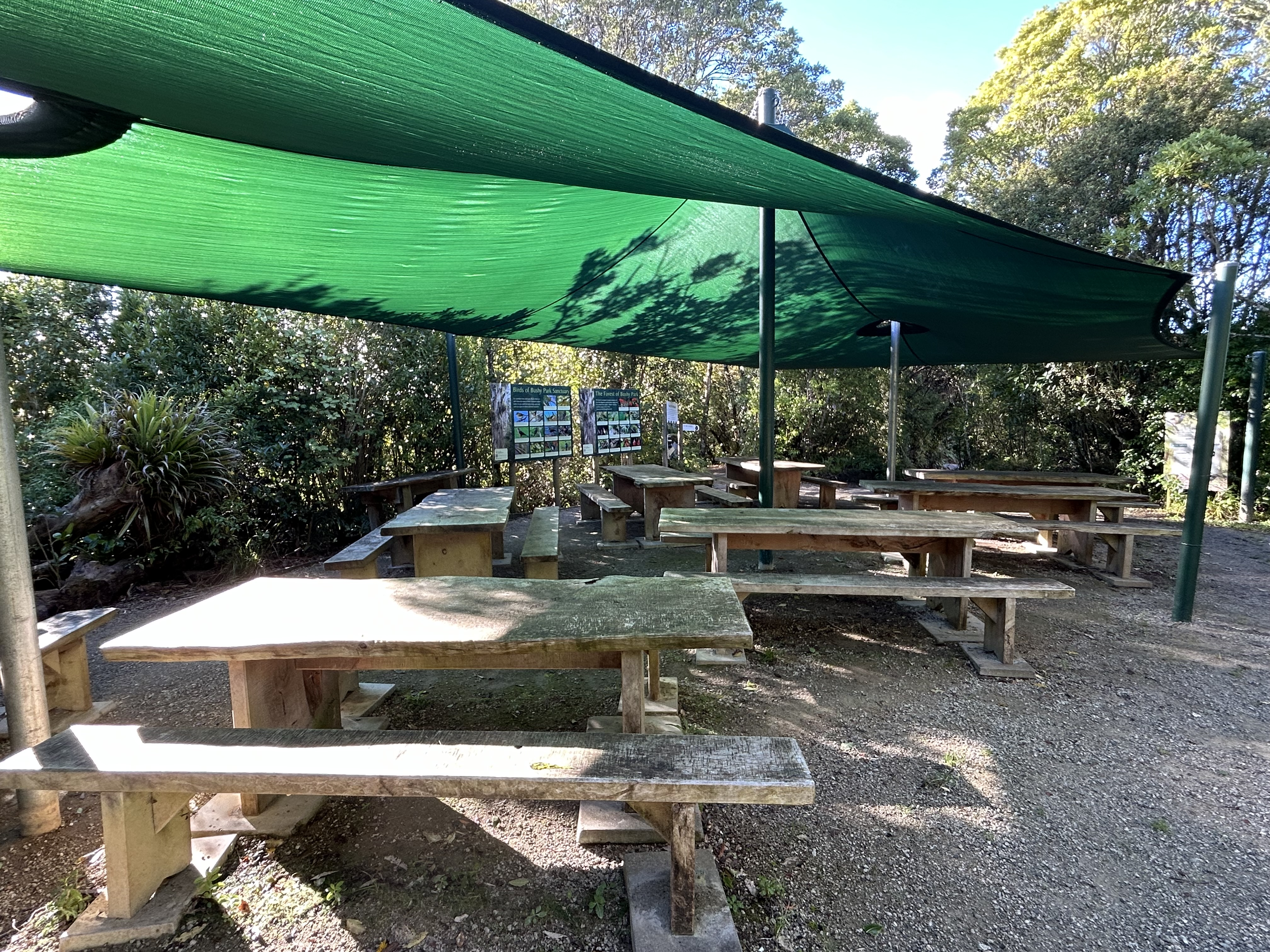
Outdoor classroom

The Bushy Park Tarapuruhi Trust provides education programmes at the sanctuary for school children and other groups. These programmes began in 2001, and are supported by volunteer educators working in collaboration with educators from Whanganui Regional Museum and the Sarjeant Gallery, and rangers from the Department of Conservation. An outdoor classroom is located adjacent to the former stables behind the homestead. The classroom, named Tāne Whakapiripiri, was opened in 2017 and seats 60–80 under waterproof shade covers.

The reserve includes a wetland area that has been developed as an educational resource. The wetland has boardwalks, jetties and a 60-seat covered amphitheatre. The development of the wetland area was funded and constructed by community volunteers.

The educational activities offered include studies of the biodiversity and ecology in the sanctuary, walks through the sanctuary, art and camping. Around 2,000 students visit the sanctuary each year.

== Sources cited ==
- Campbell-Hunt, Diane (2013). Ecosanctuaries : communities building a future for New Zealand's threatened ecologies. Otago University Press. ISBN 978-1-877578-56-4. LCCN 2014397707. OCLC 854612037. Wikidata Q127512835.
- Robinson, Penny (2006). Weaving a Dream: The Bushy Park Experience. The Bushy Park Trust. ISBN 978-0-473-11612-5. Wikidata Q121177115.
