= Charles Natusch =

New Zealand architect (1859–1951)

Charles Tilleard Natusch
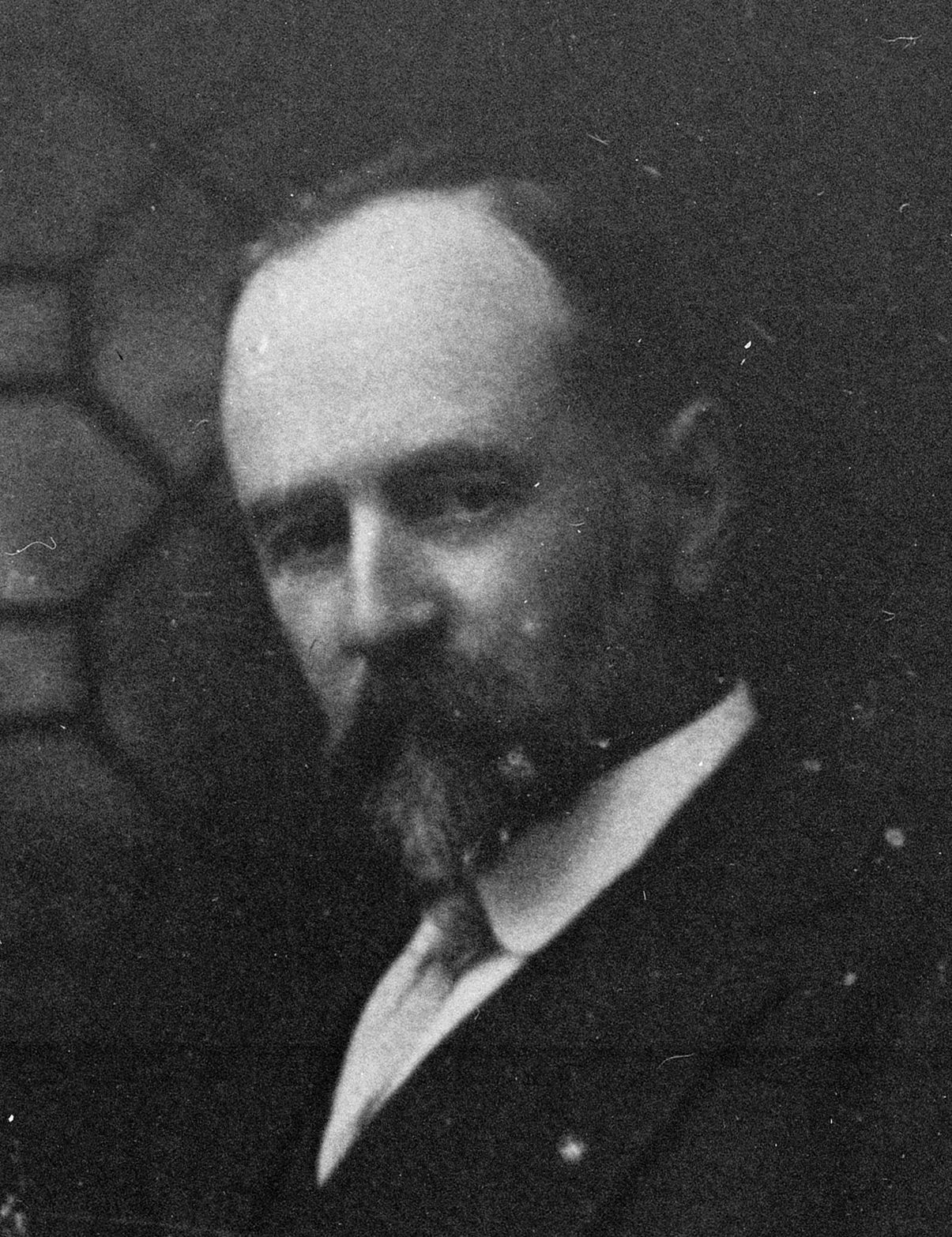
- Charles Natusch in c. 1900
- Born: Lewis Tilleard Natusch; 4 October 1859; London, England
- Died: 16 July 1951 (aged 91); Paraparaumu, New Zealand
- Occupation: Architect

Lewis Tilleard Natusch, but always known as Charles Natusch, (4 October 1859 – 16 July 1951) was a noted New Zealand architect and quantity surveyor, known particularly as a builder of fine houses for wealthy clients.

== Early life ==
Born and raised in London, England, he trained there as an architect, travelled to the United States and Canada in 1882–83, and returned to England. On 14 March 1883, he married Ada Spencer at Kelvedon, Essex. He shared the liberal political views of Angela Burdett-Coutts, 1st Baroness Burdett-Coutts, and she was influential in him getting a town planning commission in Westcliff, Southend-on-Sea. The Westward Ho Hotel design came out of this commission, and it was his last major work in England. In 1886, he departed with his wife and their first two sons for New Zealand.

== Career in New Zealand ==
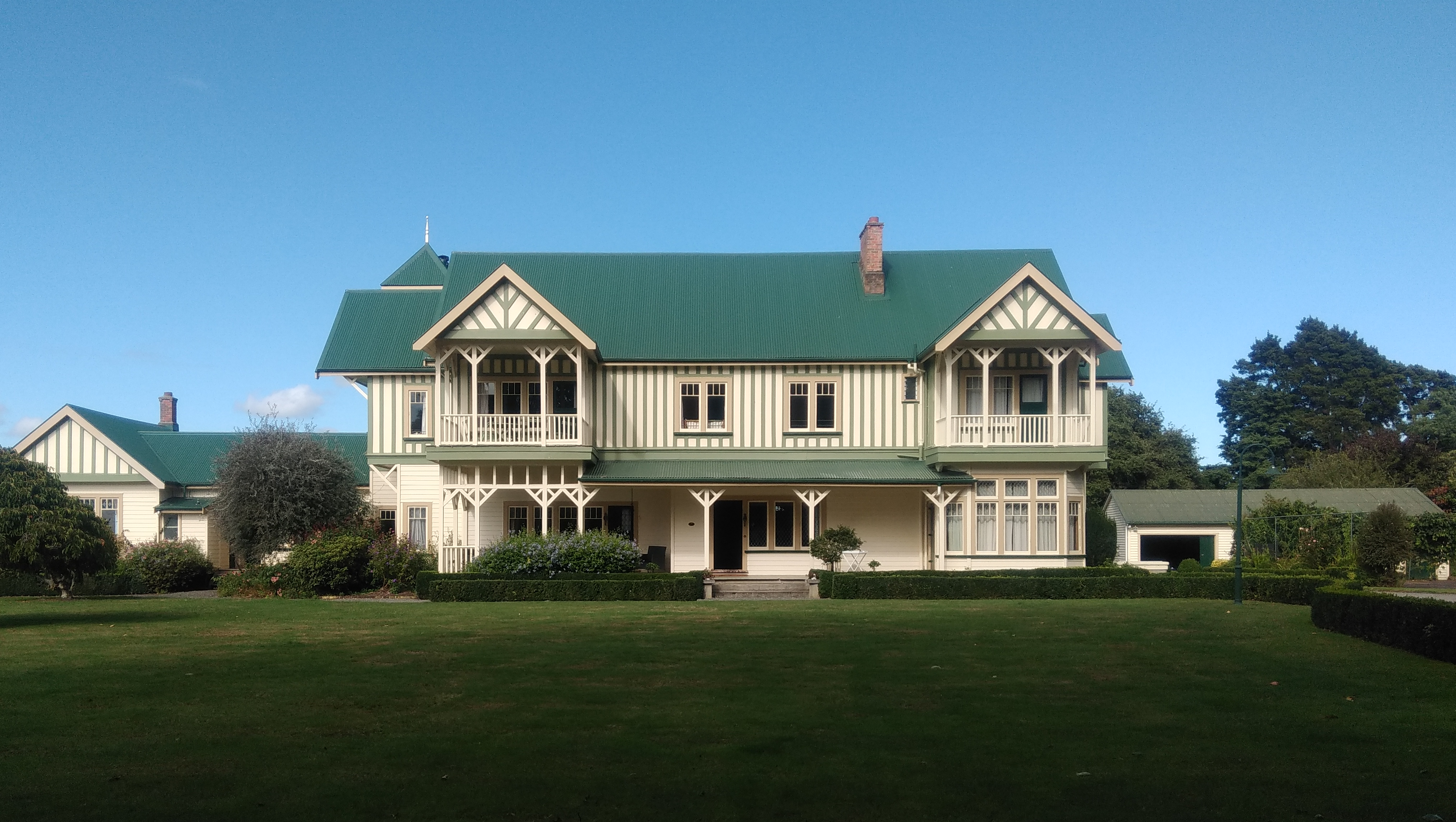
Maungaraupi Country Estate (pictured 2018). Natusch designed the homestead, which was built in 1906 for William Swainson Marshall, as an example of Tudor-style architecture.

For the next 30 years, Natusch established himself between Wellington and Hawke's Bay particularly as a builder of fine houses in a variety of styles. These ranged from those that displayed an Italian influence, such as Bushy Park (1905) near Wanganui, through Tudor style like Maungaraupi Homestead (1906) in Marton. Other examples of his work that reflect his use of local materials are Erewhon (1898) near Taihape, Matapiro (1907) in Hawke's Bay, and Atawhai (1908) in Palmerston North. He also introduced innovations into commercial and industrial buildings as well as churches. Natusch later had his architectural practice in Napier, and one of his pupils was Louis Hay.

== Family and death ==
Charles and Ada had ten children. He died on 16 July 1951 at Paraparaumu aged 91, survived by his wife and eight of their children. Three of their sons, Aleck, Rene and Stanley, became architects and quantity surveyors and carried on the family firm as Natusch & Sons. Rene's son, Guy Natusch, continued the family firm until his retirement around 1997.

== Noted works ==
Some of Natusch's works are registered by Heritage New Zealand as indicated in the following list. Later designs were by C. Tilleard Natusch and Sons, and it is unclear whether Charles Natusch was involved.

- 1884 Westward Ho Hotel, Southend-on-Sea (demolished 1965)
- 1890 Gwavas, Hawkes Bay (Category I)
- 1892 Homebush, Masterton (Category II)
- 1898 Erewhon, Taihape
- 1900 Te Aute College Chapel
- 1901 Westella, Feilding
- 1903 Springvale, Tikokino (Category II)
- 1903 Silverford, Napier
- 1904 St John's Cathedral, Napier (destroyed in 1931)
- 1904 Rangiatea (Bulls)
- 1906 Bushy Park, Kai Iwi, Whanganui (Category I)
- 1906 Wellington Stock Exchange
- 1906 St Andrews Presbyterian Church, Hastings (destroyed in 1931)
- 1906 Maungaraupi, Marton (Category I)
- 1906 Shalimar, Palmerston North
- 1907 Matapiro, Hawkes Bay (Category I)
- 1908 Atawhai, Palmerston North
- 1932 McGruer's Building, Napier (Category II)
- 1935 Kia Ora, Pahiatua (Category II)
