= Guy Natusch =

New Zealand architect (1921–2020)

Guy Natusch MNZM DSC
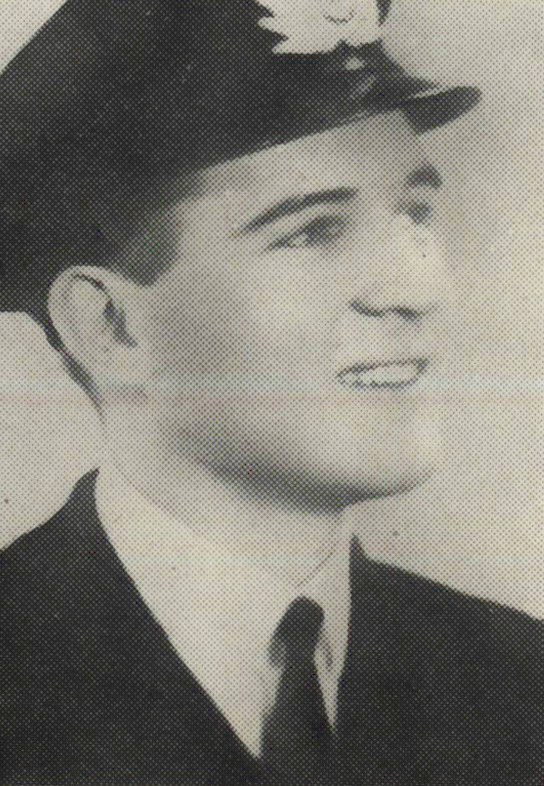
- Natusch during World War II
- Born: Guy Kingdon Natusch; 7 February 1921; Hastings, New Zealand
- Died: 30 September 2020 (aged 99); Hastings, New Zealand
- Occupation: Architect
- Years active: 1946–1997
- Known for: Solwood Houses; Heritage preservation
- Relatives: Charles Natusch (grandfather)
- Practice: Natusch & Sons
- Military career
- Allegiance: New Zealand
- Branch: Royal New Zealand Navy
- Service years: 1942–1945
- Rank: Sub lieutenant
- Conflicts: World War II; Normandy landings

Guy Kingdon Natusch MNZM DSC (7 February 1921 – 30 September 2020) was a New Zealand architect. He grew up in Hawke's Bay, where he practised until his retirement in 1997.

== Biography ==
Natusch was born in Hastings in 1921, the son of architect Rene Natusch. During World War II, he served in the Royal New Zealand Navy from 1942 to 1945 on destroyers and motor torpedo boats, serving in the North Sea and English Channel for D-Day operations. He was awarded the Distinguished Service Cross in May 1944, for good service against enemy light forces.

Natusch's grandfather, Charles Natusch, had arrived in New Zealand in 1886 and founded the architectural and quantity surveying firm, Natusch & Sons. Guy Natusch was active in the firm from 1946 to 1997, working on both commercial and residential projects. His style of architecture emphasized the building's function over its appearance. He also developed a basic housing project called Solwood Houses.

Following his retirement from practice, Natusch remained active as a heritage advisor to Heritage New Zealand, a role that he began in the late 1960s.

In the 2003 New Year Honours, Natusch was appointed a Member of the New Zealand Order of Merit, for services to architecture.

Natusch died on 30 September 2020, aged 99.

== Noted works ==
- 1950 Bisson House, Napier
- 1951 Red Cross Hall, Napier
- 1951 Christian Science Society, Napier
- 1952 Rathbone House, Waipawa
- 1953 War Memorial Hall, Napier
- 1962 Wool Exchange Building, Napier
