= List of birds of the Chatham Islands =

This is a list of birds of the Chatham Islands, an archipelago in the Pacific Ocean about 650 kilometres (400 mi) east of mainland New Zealand. In 1995, Chatham Islands County was dissolved and reconstituted by a New Zealand act of Parliament as the "Chatham Islands Territory", with powers similar to those of territorial authorities and some functions similar to those of a regional council. This list's taxonomic treatment and nomenclature (common and scientific names) mainly follows the conventions of The Clements Checklist of Birds of the World, 2022 edition. Some supplemental referencing is that of the Avibase Bird Checklists of the World as of October 2022.

The species and subspecies marked extinct became extinct subsequent to humans' arrival in the Chatham Islands. About two thirds of the extinctions occurred after the arrival of Māori but before the arrival of pākehā (European New Zealanders) and the rest since pākehā arrived.

Unless otherwise noted, all species listed below are considered to occur regularly in the Chatham Islands as permanent residents, summer or winter visitors, or migrants. The following codes are used to denote other categories of species:

- (I) Introduced - a species introduced to New Zealand by the actions of humans, either directly or indirectly
- (E) Extinct - a recent species that no longer exists
- (V) Vagrant - birds considered to be accidental visitors, with few modern records

== Ducks, geese, and waterfowl ==
Order: Anseriformes Family: Anatidae

The family Anatidae includes the ducks and most duck-like waterfowl, such as geese and swans. These are adapted for an aquatic existence, with webbed feet, bills that are flattened to a greater or lesser extent, and feathers that are excellent at shedding water due to special oils.

- Chatham duck, Anas chathamica (E)
- Pāteke, Anas chlorotis
- Mallard, Anas platyrhynchos (I)
- Pārera, Anas superciliosa
- Graylag goose, Anser anser (I)
- Papango, Aythya novaeseelandiae
- Canada goose, Branta canadensis (V)
- Black swan, Cygnus atratus (I)
- Plumed whistling-duck, Dendrocygna eytoni (V)
- Chatham Island merganser, Mergus milleneri (E)
- Australasian shoveler, Spatula rhynchotis (V)
- Australian shelduck Tadorna tadornoides (V)
- Rēkohu shelduck, Tadorna rekohu (E)
- Putangitangi, Tadorna variegata (V)

== New World quail ==
Order: Galliformes Family: Odontophoridae

Odontophoridae are not native to the Chatham Islands, but feral populations of one species survives.

- California quail, Callipepla californica (I)

== Pigeons and doves ==
Order: Columbiformes Family: Columbidae

Pigeons and doves are stout-bodied birds with short necks and short slender bills with a fleshy cere.

- Rock pigeon, Columba livia (V)
- Chatham pigeon, Hemiphaga chathamensis
- New Zealand pigeon, Hemiphaga novaeseelandiae

== Cuckoos ==
Order: Cuculiformes Family: Cuculidae

The family Cuculidae includes cuckoos, roadrunners and anis. These birds are of variable size with slender bodies, long tails and strong legs. The Old World cuckoos are brood parasites.

- Pīpīwharauroa, Chrysococcyx lucidus
- Koekoeā, Eudynamys taitensis (V)

== Swifts ==
Order: Caprimulgiformes Family: Apodidae

Swifts are small birds which spend the majority of their lives flying. These birds have very short legs and never settle voluntarily on the ground, perching instead only on vertical surfaces. Many swifts have long swept-back wings which resemble a crescent or boomerang.

- Pacific swift, Apus pacificus (V)
- White-throated needletail, Hirandapus caudacutus (V)

== Rails, gallinules, and coots ==
Order: Gruiformes Family: Rallidae

Rallidae is a large family of small to medium-sized birds which includes the rails, crakes, coots and gallinules. Typically they inhabit dense vegetation in damp environments near lakes, swamps or rivers. In general they are shy and secretive birds, making them difficult to observe. Most species have strong legs and long toes which are well adapted to soft uneven surfaces. They tend to have short, rounded wings and to be weak fliers.

- Hawkins's rail, Diaphorapteryx hawkinsi (E)
- Chatham coot, Fulica chathamensis (E)
- Weka, Gallirallus australis
- Dieffenbach's rail, Gallirallus dieffenbachii (E)
- Chatham Islands rail, Gallirallus modestus (E)
- Buff-banded rail, Gallirallus philippensis
- Pūkeko, Porphyrio melanotus
- Baillon's crake, Zapornia pusilla (V)
- Spotless crake, Zapornia tabuensis (V)

== Stilts and avocets ==
Order: Charadriiformes Family: Recurvirostridae

Recurvirostridae is a family of large wading birds, which includes the avocets and stilts. The avocets have long legs and long up-curved bills. The stilts have extremely long legs and long, thin straight bills.

- Pied stilt, Himantopus leucocephalus

== Oystercatchers ==
Order: Charadriiformes Family: Haematopodidae

The oystercatchers are large and noisy plover-like birds, with strong bills used for smashing or prising open molluscs.

- Chatham oystercatcher, Haematopus chathamensis
- South Island oystercatcher, Haematopus finschi (V)

== Plovers and lapwings ==
Order: Charadriiformes Family: Charadriidae

The family Charadriidae includes the plovers, dotterels and lapwings. They are small to medium-sized birds with compact bodies, short, thick necks and long, usually pointed, wings. They are found in open country worldwide, mostly in habitats near water.

- Wrybill, Anarhynchus frontalis (V)
- Double-banded plover, Charadrius bicinctus
- Lesser sand-plover, Charadrius mongolus (V)
- Oriental plover, Charadrius veredus (V)
- Pacific golden-plover, Pluvialis fulva
- Black-bellied plover, Pluvialis squatarola (V)
- Tuturuatu, Thinornis novaeseelandiae
- Masked lapwing, Vanellus miles

== Sandpipers and allies ==
Order: Charadriiformes Family: Scolopacidae

- Whimbrel, Numenius phaeopus (V)
- Far Eastern curlew, Numenius madagascarensis (V)
- Bar-tailed godwit, Limosa lapponica
- Black-tailed godwit, Limosa limosa (V)
- Hudsonian godwit, Limosa haemastica (V)
- Ruddy turnstone, Arenaria interpres
- Huahou, Calidris canutus
- Sharp-tailed sandpiper, Calidris acuminata (V)
- Curlew sandpiper, Calidris ferruginea (V)
- Red-necked stint, Calidris ruficollis (V)
- Sanderling, Calidris alba (V)
- Pectoral sandpiper, Calidris melanotos (V)
- Chatham Islands snipe, Coenocorypha pusilla
- Forbes's snipe, Coenocorypha chathamica (E)
- Gray-tailed tattler, Tringa brevipes (V)
- Wandering tattler, Tringa incana (V)
- Common greenshank, Tringa nebularia (V)
- Lesser yellowlegs, Tringa flavipes (V)
- Marsh sandpiper, Tringa stagnatilis (V)

== Skuas and jaegers ==
Order: Charadriiformes Family: Stercorariidae

The family Stercorariidae are, in general, medium to large birds, typically with grey or brown plumage, often with white markings on the wings. They nest on the ground in temperate and arctic regions and are long-distance migrants.

- Brown skua, Stercorarius antarcticus
- Long-tailed jaeger, Stercorarius longicaudus (V)
- South polar skua, Stercorarius maccormicki (V)
- Parasitic jaeger, Stercorarius parasiticus
- Pomarine jaeger, Stercorarius pomarinus (V)

== Gulls, terns, and skimmers ==
Order: Charadriiformes Family: Laridae

Laridae is a family of medium to large seabirds, the gulls, terns, and skimmers. Gulls are typically grey or white, often with black markings on the head or wings. They have stout, longish bills and webbed feet. Terns are a group of generally medium to large seabirds typically with grey or white plumage, often with black markings on the head. Most terns hunt fish by diving but some pick insects off the surface of fresh water. Terns are generally long-lived birds, with several species known to live in excess of 30 years. Skimmers are a small family of tropical tern-like birds. They have an elongated lower mandible which they use to feed by flying low over the water surface and skimming the water for small fish.

- Black-fronted tern Chlidonias albostriatus (V)
- Silver gull, Chroicocephalus novaehollandiae
- Taranui, Hydroprogne caspia (V)
- Karoro, Larus dominicanus
- Sooty tern Onychoprion fuscatus
- Little tern, Sternula albifrons (V)
- Arctic tern, Sterna paradisaea (V)
- White-fronted tern Sterna striata
- Antarctic tern, Sterna vittata (V)

== Penguins ==
Order: Sphenisciformes Family: Spheniscidae

Penguins are a group of aquatic, flightless birds living almost exclusively in the Southern Hemisphere, especially in Antarctica.

- King penguin, Aptenodytes patagonicus (V)
- Chatham penguin, Eudyptes chathamensis (E)
- Southern rockhopper penguin, Eudyptes chrysocome (V)
- Moseley's rockhopper penguin, Eudyptes moseleyi (V)
- Snares penguin, Eudyptes robustus (V)
- Royal penguin, Eudyptes schlegeli (V)
- Erect-crested penguin, Eudyptes sclateri
- Little penguin, Eudyptula minor
- Yellow-eyed penguin, Megadyptes antipodes (V)

== Albatrosses ==
Order: Procellariiformes Family: Diomedeidae

The albatrosses are a family of large seabird found across the Southern and North Pacific Oceans. The largest are among the largest flying birds in the world.

- Royal albatross, Diomedea epomophora - vulnerable
- Wandering albatross, Diomedea exulans - vulnerable
- Sooty albatross, Phoebetria fusca (V) - endangered
- Light-mantled albatross, Phoebetria palpebrata (V) - near-threatened
- Buller's albatross, Thalassarche bulleri - near-threatened
- White-capped albatross, Thalassarche cauta - near-threatened
- Yellow-nosed albatross, Thalassarche chlororhynchos (V) - endangered
- Gray-headed albatross, Thalassarche chrysostoma (V) - endangered
- Chatham albatross, Thalassarche eremita - vulnerable
- Black-browed albatross, Thalassarche melanophris - near-threatened
- Salvin's albatross, Thalassarche salvini - vulnerable

== Southern storm-petrels ==
Order: Procellariiformes Family: Oceanitidae

The southern storm-petrels are the smallest seabirds, relatives of the petrels, feeding on planktonic crustaceans and small fish picked from the surface, typically while hovering. Their flight is fluttering and sometimes bat-like.

- Black-bellied storm-petrel, Fregetta tropica
- Gray-backed storm-petrel, Garrodia nereis
- Wilson's storm-petrel, Oceanites oceanicus
- White-faced storm-petrel, Pelagodroma marina

== Northern storm-petrels ==
Order: Procellariiformes Family: Hydrobatidae

Though the members of this family are similar in many respects to the southern storm-petrels, including their general appearance and habits, there are enough genetic differences to warrant their placement in a separate family.

- Leach's storm-petrel, Hydrobates leucorrhous (V)

== Shearwaters and petrels ==
Order: Procellariiformes Family: Procellariidae

The procellariids are the main group of medium-sized "true petrels", characterised by united nostrils with medium nasal septum, and a long outer functional primary flight feather.

- Southern giant-petrel, Macronectes giganteus (V)
- Northern giant-petrel, Macronectes halli
- Southern fulmar, Fulmarus glacialoides (V)
- Antarctic petrel, Thalassoica antarctica (V)
- Cape petrel, Daption capense
- Kerguelen petrel, Aphrodroma brevirostris (V)
- Gray-faced petrel, Pterodroma gouldi
- Kermadec petrel, Pterodroma neglecta (V)
- Magenta petrel, Pterodroma magentae
- Soft-plumaged petrel, Pterodroma mollis (V)
- White-headed petrel, Pterodroma lessonii (V)
- Imber's petrel, Pterodroma imberi (E)
- Mottled petrel, Pterodroma inexpectata (V)
- Juan Fernandez petrel, Pterodroma externa (V)
- Black-winged petrel, Pterodroma nigripennis
- Chatham petrel, Pterodroma axillaris
- Cook's petrel, Pterodroma cookii
- Pycroft's petrel, Pterodroma pycrofti
- Blue petrel, Halobaena caerulea (V)
- Fairy prion, Pachyptila turtur
- Broad-billed prion, Pachyptila vittata
- Salvin's prion, Pachyptila salvini (V)
- Antarctic prion, Pachyptila desolata (V)
- Fulmar prion, Pachyptila crassirostris
- Gray petrel, Procellaria cinerea (V)
- White-chinned petrel, Procellaria aequinoctialis (V)
- Parkinson's petrel, Procellaria parkinsoni (V)
- Westland petrel, Procellaria westlandica (V)
- Flesh-footed shearwater, Ardenna carneipes (V)
- Great shearwater, Ardenna gravis (V)
- Buller's shearwater, Ardenna bulleri
- Sooty shearwater, Ardenna griseus
- Short-tailed shearwater, Ardenna tenuirostris (V)
- Fluttering shearwater, Puffinus gavia (V)
- Little shearwater, Puffinus assimilis
- Subantarctic shearwater, Puffinus elegans
- Common diving-petrel, Pelecanoides urinatrix
- South Georgia diving-petrel, Pelecanoides georgicus

== Frigatebirds ==
Order: Suliformes Family: Fregatidae

Frigatebirds are large seabirds usually found over tropical oceans. They are large, black-and-white, or completely black, with long wings and deeply forked tails. The males have colored inflatable throat pouches. They do not swim or walk and cannot take off from a flat surface. Having the largest wingspan-to-body-weight ratio of any bird, they are essentially aerial, able to stay aloft for more than a week.

- Lesser frigatebird, Fregata ariel (V)

== Boobies and gannets ==
Order: Suliformes Family: Sulidae

The sulids comprise the gannets and boobies. Both groups are medium-large coastal seabirds that plunge-dive for fish.

- Australasian gannet, Morus serrator (V)

== Cormorants and shags ==
Order: Suliformes Family: Phalacrocoracidae

Cormorants are medium-to-large aquatic birds, usually with mainly dark plumage and areas of coloured skin on the face. The bill is long, thin and sharply hooked. Their feet are four-toed and webbed, a distinguishing feature among the order Pelecaniformes.

- Little pied cormorant, Microcarbo melanoleucos - Vagrant
- Little black cormorant, Microcarbo sulcirostris
- Great cormorant, Phalacrocorax carbo (Māori, kawau)
- Pitt Island shag, Phalacrocorax featherstoni - endangered
- Chatham Islands shag, Phalacrocorax onslowi - critically endangered
- Spotted shag, Phalacrocorax punctatus

== Herons, egrets, and bitterns ==
Order: Pelecaniformes Family: Ardeidae

The family Ardeidae contains the bitterns, herons, and egrets. Herons and egrets are medium to large wading birds with long necks and legs. Bitterns tend to be shorter necked and more wary. Members of Ardeidae fly with their necks retracted, unlike other long-necked birds such as storks, ibises and spoonbills.

- Great egret, Ardea alba
- Australasian bittern, Botaurus poiciloptilus - endangered
- Cattle egret, Bubulcus ibis (V)
- White-faced heron, Egretta novaehollandiae
- Pacific reef-heron, Egretta sacra (V)
- New Zealand bittern, Ixobrychus novaezelandiae (E)

== Ibises and spoonbills ==
Order: Pelecaniformes Family: Threskiornithidae

Threskiornithidae is a family of large terrestrial and wading birds which includes the ibises and spoonbills. They have long, broad wings with 11 primary and about 20 secondary feathers. They are strong fliers and despite their size and weight, very capable soarers.

- Glossy ibis, Plegadis falcinellus (V)
- Royal spoonbill, Platalea regia (V)

== Hawks, eagles, and kites ==
Order: Accipitriformes Family: Accipitridae

Accipitridae is a family of birds of prey, which includes hawks, eagles, kites, harriers and Old World vultures. These birds have powerful hooked beaks for tearing flesh from their prey, strong legs, powerful talons and keen eyesight.

- Kāhu, Circus approximans

== Owls ==
Order: Strigiformes Family: Strigidae

The typical owls are small to large solitary nocturnal birds of prey. They have large forward-facing eyes and ears, a hawk-like beak, and a conspicuous circle of feathers around each eye called a facial disk.

- Morepork, Ninox novaeseelandiae (Māori, ruru)

== Kingfishers ==
Order: Coraciiformes Family: Alcedinidae

Kingfishers are medium-sized birds with large heads, long pointed bills, short legs, and stubby tails.

- Sacred kingfisher, Todiramphus sacra (Māori, kōtare) (V)

== Falcons and caracaras ==
Order: Falconiformes Family: Falconidae

Falconidae is a family of diurnal birds of prey. They differ from hawks, eagles, and kites in that they kill with their beaks instead of their talons.

- New Zealand falcon, Falco novaeseelandiae (Māori, kārearea)

== New Zealand parrots ==
Order: Psittaciformes Family: Strigopidae

The New Zealand parrot superfamily, Strigopoidea, consists of at least three genera of parrots – Nestor, Strigops, the fossil Nelepsittacus, and probably the fossil Heracles. The genus Nestor consists of the kea, kākā, Norfolk Island kākā and Chatham Island kākā, while the genus Strigops contains the iconic kākāpō. All extant species are endemic to New Zealand. The species of the genus Nelepsittacus were endemics of the main islands, while the two extinct species of the genus Nestor were found at the nearby oceanic islands such as Chatham Island of New Zealand, and Norfolk Island and adjacent Phillip Island.

- Chatham kākā, Nestor chathamensis (E)

== Old world parrots ==
Order: Psittaciformes Family: Psittaculidae

Characteristic features of parrots include a strong curved bill, an upright stance, strong legs, and clawed zygodactyl feet. Many parrots are vividly coloured, and some are multi-coloured. In size they range from 8 cm (3.1 in) to 1 m (3.3 ft) in length. Old World parrots are found from Africa east across south and southeast Asia and Oceania to Australia and New Zealand.

- Chatham Islands parakeet, Cyanoramphus forbesi
- Kākāriki, Cyanoramphus novaezelandiae - vulnerable

== Honeyeaters ==
Order: Passeriformes Family: Meliphagidae

The honeyeaters are a large and diverse family of small to medium-sized birds most common in Australia and New Guinea. They are nectar feeders and closely resemble other nectar-feeding passerines.

- Chatham Island bellbird, Anthornis melanocephala (E)
- Tūī, Prosthemadera novaeseelandiae

== Thornbills and allies ==
Order: Passeriformes Family: Acanthizidae

Thornbills are small passerine birds, similar in habits to the tits.

- Chatham Island gerygone, Gerygone albofrontata
- Grey warbler, Gerygone igata

== Fantails ==
Order: Passeriformes Family: Rhipiduridae

The fantails are small insectivorous birds which are specialist aerial feeders.

- Pīwakawaka, Rhipidura fuliginosa
- Willie wagtail, Rhipidura leucophrys (V)

== Crows, jays, and magpies ==
Order: Passeriformes Family: Corvidae

The family Corvidae includes crows, ravens, jays, choughs, magpies, treepies, nutcrackers and ground jays. Corvids are above average in size among the Passeriformes, and some of the larger species show high levels of intelligence.

- Rook, Corvus frugilegus (V)
- Chatham raven, Corvus moriorum (E)

== Australasian robins ==
Order: Passeriformes Family: Petroicidae

Most species of Petroicidae have a stocky build with a large rounded head, a short straight bill and rounded wingtips. They occupy a wide range of wooded habitats, from subalpine to tropical rainforest, and mangrove swamp to semi-arid scrubland. All are primarily insectivores, although a few supplement their diet with seeds.

- Miromiro, Petroica macrocephala
- Chatham robin, Petroica traversi

== Larks ==
Order: Passeriformes Family: Alaudidae

Larks are small terrestrial birds with often extravagant songs and display flights. Most larks are fairly dull in appearance. Their food is insects and seeds.

- Eurasian skylark, Alauda arvensis (I)

== Grassbirds and allies ==
Order: Passeriformes Family: Locustellidae

Locustellidae are a family of small insectivorous songbirds found mainly in Eurasia, Africa, and the Australian region. They are smallish birds with tails that are usually long and pointed, and tend to be drab brownish or buffy all over.

- Chatham Islands fernbird, Megalurus rufescens (E)

== Swallows ==
Order: Passeriformes Family: Hirundinidae

The family Hirundinidae is adapted to aerial feeding. They have a slender streamlined body, long pointed wings, and a short bill with a wide gape. The feet are adapted to perching rather than walking, and the front toes are partially joined at the base.

- Welcome swallow, Hirundo neoxena
- Tree martin, Petrochelidon nigricans (V)

== White-eyes, yuhinas, and allies ==
Order: Passeriformes Family: Zosteropidae

The white-eyes are small birds of rather drab appearance, the plumage above being typically greenish-olive, but some species have a white or bright yellow throat, breast, or lower parts, and several have buff flanks. As the name suggests, many species have a white ring around each eye.

- Tauhou, Zosterops lateralis

== Starlings ==
Order: Passeriformes Family: Sturnidae

Starlings are small to medium-sized passerine birds. Their flight is strong and direct and they are very gregarious. Their preferred habitat is fairly open country. They eat insects and fruit. Plumage is typically dark with a metallic sheen.

- European starling, Sturnus vulgaris (I)

== Thrushes and allies ==
Order: Passeriformes Family: Turdidae

The thrushes are a group of passerine birds that occur mainly in the Old World. They are plump, soft plumaged, small to medium-sized insectivores or sometimes omnivores, often feeding on the ground. Many have attractive songs.

- Eurasian blackbird, Turdus merula (I)
- Song thrush, Turdus philomelos (I)

== Accentors ==
Order: Passeriformes Family: Prunellidae

The accentors are in the only bird family, Prunellidae, which is completely endemic to the Palearctic. They are small, fairly drab species superficially similar to sparrows.

- Dunnock, Prunella modularis (I)

== Old World sparrows ==
Order: Passeriformes Family: Passeridae

Old World sparrows are small passerine birds. In general, sparrows tend to be small, plump, brown or grey birds with short tails and short powerful beaks. Sparrows are seed eaters, but they also consume small insects.

- House sparrow, Passer domesticus (I)

== Wagtails and pipits ==
Order: Passeriformes Family: Motacillidae

Motacillidae is a family of small passerine birds with medium to long tails. They include the wagtails, longclaws and pipits. They are slender, ground feeding insectivores of open country.

- Pīhoihoi, Anthus novaeseelandiae

== Finches, euphonias, and allies ==
Order: Passeriformes Family: Fringillidae

Finches are seed-eating passerine birds, that are small to moderately large and have a strong beak, usually conical and in some species very large. All have twelve tail feathers and nine primaries. These birds have a bouncing flight with alternating bouts of flapping and gliding on closed wings, and most sing well.

- Lesser redpoll, Acanthis cabaret (I)
- Common redpoll, Acanthis flammea (I)
- European goldfinch, Carduelis carduelis (I)
- European greenfinch, Chloris chloris (I)
- Common chaffinch, Fringilla coelebs (I)

== Old World buntings ==
Order: Passeriformes Family: Emberizidae

The emberizids are a large family of passerine birds. They are seed-eating birds with distinctively shaped bills. Many emberizid species have distinctive head patterns.

- Yellowhammer, Emberiza citrinella (V)

== See also ==
- Birds of New Zealand
- List of birds
- Lists of birds by region
