= List of birds of Norfolk Island =

This is a list of the bird species recorded on Norfolk Island. The avifauna of Norfolk Island include a total of 186 species. Norfolk Island is an external territory of Australia in the Pacific between New Zealand and New Caledonia.

This list's taxonomic treatment (designation and sequence of orders, families and species) and nomenclature (common and scientific names) follow the conventions of The Clements Checklist of Birds of the World, 2022 edition. The family accounts at the beginning of each heading reflect this taxonomy, as do the species counts found in each family account. Introduced and accidental species are included in the total counts for Norfolk Island.

The following tags have been used to highlight several categories. The commonly occurring native species do not fall into any of these categories.

- (A) Accidental - a species that rarely or accidentally occurs on Norfolk Island.
- (E) Endemic - a species endemic to Norfolk Island
- (I) Introduced - a species introduced to Norfolk Island as a consequence, direct or indirect, of human actions

== Ducks, geese, and waterfowl ==
Order: Anseriformes Family: Anatidae

Anatidae includes the ducks and most duck-like waterfowl, such as geese and swans. These birds are adapted to an aquatic existence with webbed feet, flattened bills, and feathers that are excellent at shedding water due to an oily coating.

- Plumed whistling-duck, Dendrocygna eytoni
- Graylag goose, Anser anser (I)
- Black swan, Cygnus atratus (A)
- Australian shelduck, Tadorna tadornoides (A)
- Northern shoveler, Spatula clypeata (A)
- Pacific black duck, Anas superciliosa
- Domestic mallard, Anas platyrhynchos (I)
- Gray teal, Anas gracilis (A)
- Hardhead, Aythya australis (A)

== New World quail ==
Order: Galliformes Family: Odontophoridae

The New World quails are small, plump terrestrial birds only distantly related to the quails of the Old World, but named for their similar appearance and habits.

- California quail Callipepla californica (I)

== Pheasants, grouse, and allies ==
Order: Galliformes Family: Phasianidae

Phasianidae consists of the pheasants and their allies. These are terrestrial species, variable in size but generally plump, with broad, relatively short wings. Many species are gamebirds or have been domesticated as a food source for humans.

- Red junglefowl, Gallus gallus (I)

== Grebes ==
Order: Podicipediformes Family: Podicipedidae

Grebes are small to medium-large freshwater diving birds. They have lobed toes and are excellent swimmers and divers. However, they have their feet placed far back on the body, making them quite ungainly on land.

- Australasian grebe, Tachybaptus novaehollandiae (A)

== Pigeons and doves ==
Order: Columbiformes Family: Columbidae

Pigeons and doves are stout-bodied birds with short necks and short slender bills with a fleshy cere.

- Rock pigeon, Columba livia (I)
- Pacific emerald dove, Chalcophaps longirostris (A)
- Norfolk ground dove, Alopecoenas norfolkensis (E) extinct
- Rose-crowned fruit-dove, Ptilinopus regina (A)
- Torresian imperial-pigeon, Ducula spilorrhoa
- Topknot pigeon, Lopholaimus antarcticus
- New Zealand pigeon, Hemiphaga novaeseelandiae (Ex)

== Cuckoos ==
Order: Cuculiformes Family: Cuculidae

The family Cuculidae includes cuckoos, roadrunners and anis. These birds are of variable size with slender bodies, long tails and strong legs.

- Long-tailed koel, Urodynamis taitensis
- Channel-billed cuckoo, Scythrops novaehollandiae (A)
- Shining bronze-cuckoo, Chrysococcyx lucidus
- Pallid cuckoo, Cacomantis pallidus (A)
- Fan-tailed cuckoo, Cacomantis flabelliformis (A)
- Oriental cuckoo, Cuculus optatus (A)

== Swifts ==
Order: Caprimulgiformes Family: Apodidae

Swifts are small birds which spend the majority of their lives flying. These birds have very short legs and never settle voluntarily on the ground, perching instead only on vertical surfaces. Many swifts have long swept-back wings which resemble a crescent or boomerang.

- White-throated needletail, Hirundapus caudacutus (A)
- Pacific swift, Apus pacificus (A)

== Rails, gallinules, and coots ==
Order: Gruiformes Family: Rallidae

Rallidae is a large family of small to medium-sized birds which includes the rails, crakes, coots and gallinules. Typically they inhabit dense vegetation in damp environments near lakes, swamps or rivers. In general they are shy and secretive birds, making them difficult to observe. Most species have strong legs and long toes which are well adapted to soft uneven surfaces. They tend to have short, rounded wings and to be weak fliers.

- Buff-banded rail, Gallirallus philippensis
- Eurasian coot, Fulica atra (A)
- Australasian swamphen, Porphyrio melanotus
- Spotless crake, Zapornia tabuensis

== Stilts and avocets ==
Order: Charadriiformes Family: Recurvirostridae

Recurvirostridae is a family of large wading birds, which includes the avocets and stilts. The avocets have long legs and long up-curved bills. The stilts have extremely long legs and long, thin, straight bills.

- Pied stilt, Himantopus leucocephalus (A)
- Red-necked avocet, Recurvirostra novaehollandiae (A)

== Oystercatchers ==
Order: Charadriiformes Family: Haematopodidae

The oystercatchers are large and noisy plover-like birds, with strong bills used for smashing or prising open molluscs.

- Pied oystercatcher, Haematopus longirostris (A)
- South Island oystercatcher, Haematopus finschi (A)

== Plovers and lapwings ==
Order: Charadriiformes Family: Charadriidae

The family Charadriidae includes the plovers, dotterels and lapwings. They are small to medium-sized birds with compact bodies, short, thick necks and long, usually pointed, wings. They are found in open country worldwide, mostly in habitats near water.

- Pacific golden-plover, Pluvialis fulva
- Masked lapwing, Vanellus miles (A)
- Lesser sand-plover, Charadrius mongolus
- Greater sand-plover, Charadrius leschenaultii
- Double-banded plover, Charadrius bicinctus
- Common ringed plover, Charadrius hiaticula (A)
- Oriental plover, Charadrius veredus (A)

== Sandpipers and allies ==
Order: Charadriiformes Family: Scolopacidae

Scolopacidae is a large diverse family of small to medium-sized shorebirds including the sandpipers, curlews, godwits, shanks, tattlers, woodcocks, snipes, dowitchers and phalaropes. The majority of these species eat small invertebrates picked out of the mud or soil. Variation in length of legs and bills enables multiple species to feed in the same habitat, particularly on the coast, without direct competition for food.

- Bristle-thighed curlew, Numenius tahitiensis (A)
- Whimbrel, Numenius phaeopus
- Little curlew, Numenius minutus (A)
- Far Eastern curlew, Numenius madagascariensis (A)
- Bar-tailed godwit, Limosa lapponica
- Black-tailed godwit, Limosa limosa (A)
- Hudsonian godwit, Limosa haemastica (A)
- Ruddy turnstone, Arenaria interpres
- Red knot, Calidris canutus
- Sharp-tailed sandpiper, Calidris acuminata
- Curlew sandpiper, Calidris ferruginea
- Red-necked stint, Calidris ruficollis
- Sanderling, Calidris alba
- Pectoral sandpiper, Calidris melanotos (A)
- Latham's snipe, Gallinago hardwickii (A)
- Terek sandpiper, Xenus cinereus
- Common sandpiper, Actitis hypoleucos (A)
- Gray-tailed tattler, Tringa brevipes
- Wandering tattler, Tringa incana
- Common greenshank, Tringa nebularia
- Marsh sandpiper, Tringa stagnatilis

== Pratincoles and coursers ==
Order: Charadriiformes Family: Glareolidae

Glareolidae is a family of wading birds comprising the pratincoles, which have short legs, long pointed wings and long forked tails, and the coursers, which have long legs, short wings and long, pointed bills which curve downwards.

- Oriental pratincole, Glareola maldivarum (A)

== Skuas and jaegers ==
Order: Charadriiformes Family: Stercorariidae

The family Stercorariidae are, in general, medium to large birds, typically with grey or brown plumage, often with white markings on the wings. They nest on the ground in temperate and arctic regions and are long-distance migrants.

- South polar skua, Stercorarius maccormicki (A)
- Brown skua, Stercorarius antarcticus (A)
- Pomarine jaeger, Stercorarius pomarinus (A)
- Parasitic jaeger, Stercorarius parasiticus (A)
- Long-tailed jaeger, Stercorarius longicaudus (A)

== Gulls, terns, and skimmers ==
Order: Charadriiformes Family: Laridae

Laridae is a family of medium to large seabirds, the gulls, terns, and skimmers. Gulls are typically grey or white, often with black markings on the head or wings. They have stout, longish bills and webbed feet. Terns are a group of generally medium to large seabirds typically with grey or white plumage, often with black markings on the head. Most terns hunt fish by diving but some pick insects off the surface of fresh water. Terns are generally long-lived birds, with several species known to live in excess of 30 years.

- Silver gull, Chroicocephalus novaehollandiae (A)
- Laughing gull, Leucophaeus atricilla (A)
- Kelp gull, Larus dominicanus (A)
- Brown noddy, Anous stolidus
- Black noddy, Anous minutus
- Gray noddy, Anous albivitta
- White tern, Gygis alba
- Sooty tern, Onychoprion fuscatus
- Bridled tern, Onychoprion anaethetus
- Little tern, Sternula albifrons (A)
- Australian fairy tern, Sternula nereis (A)
- White-winged tern, Chlidonias leucopterus (A)
- Whiskered tern, Chlidonias hybrida (A)
- Roseate tern, Sterna dougallii
- White-fronted tern, Sterna striata (A)
- Great crested tern, Thalasseus bergii (A)

== Tropicbirds ==
Order: Phaethontiformes Family: Phaethontidae

Tropicbirds are slender white birds of tropical oceans, with exceptionally long central tail feathers. Their long wings have black markings, as does the head.

- White-tailed tropicbird, Phaethon lepturus (A)
- Red-tailed tropicbird, Phaethon rubricauda

== Albatrosses ==
Order: Procellariiformes Family: Diomedeidae

The albatrosses are among the largest of flying birds, and the great albatrosses from the genus Diomedea have the largest wingspans of any extant birds.

- Yellow-nosed albatross, Thalassarche chlororhynchos
- White-capped albatross, Thalassarche cauta
- Chatham albatross, Thalassarche eremita (A)
- Black-browed albatross, Thalassarche melanophris (A)
- Wandering albatross, Diomedea exulans (A)
- Laysan albatross, Phoebastria immutabilis (A)

== Southern storm-petrels ==
Order: Procellariiformes Family: Oceanitidae

The southern storm-petrels are relatives of the petrels and are the smallest seabirds. They feed on planktonic crustaceans and small fish picked from the surface, typically while hovering. The flight is fluttering and sometimes bat-like.

- Wilson's storm-petrel, Oceanites oceanicus (A)
- White-faced storm-petrel, Pelagodroma marina (Ex)
- White-bellied storm-petrel, Fregetta grallaria
- Black-bellied storm-petrel, Fregetta tropica
- Polynesian storm-petrel, Nesofregetta fuliginosa (A)

== Shearwaters and petrels ==
Order: Procellariiformes Family: Procellariidae

The procellariids are the main group of medium-sized "true petrels", characterised by united nostrils with medium septum and a long outer functional primary.

- Southern giant-petrel, Macronectes giganteus (A)
- Northern giant-petrel, Macronectes halli
- Cape petrel, Daption capense
- Gray-faced petrel, Pterodroma gouldi (A)
- Kermadec petrel, Pterodroma neglecta
- Providence petrel, Pterodroma solandri
- Mottled petrel, Pterodroma inexpectata (A)
- White-necked petrel, Pterodroma cervicalis
- Black-winged petrel, Pterodroma nigripennis
- Cook's petrel, Pterodroma cookii (A)
- Gould's petrel, Pterodroma leucoptera (A)
- Collared petrel, Pterodroma brevipes (A)
- Pycroft's petrel, Pterodroma pycrofti (A)
- Vanuatu petrel, Pterodroma occulta (A)
- Fairy prion, Pachyptila turtur (A)
- Slender-billed prion, Pachyptila belcheri
- Tahiti petrel, Pseudobulweria rostrata (A)
- White-chinned petrel, Procellaria aequinoctialis (A)
- Parkinson's petrel, Procellaria parkinsoni
- Flesh-footed shearwater, Ardenna carneipes
- Wedge-tailed shearwater, Ardenna pacifica
- Buller's shearwater, Ardenna bulleri
- Sooty shearwater, Ardenna grisea (A)
- Short-tailed shearwater, Ardenna tenuirostris (A)
- Newell's shearwater, Puffinus newelli (A)
- Fluttering shearwater, Puffinus gavia
- Little shearwater, Puffinus assimilis
- Common diving-petrel, Pelecanoides urinatrix

== Frigatebirds ==
Order: Suliformes Family: Fregatidae

Frigatebirds are large seabirds usually found over tropical oceans. They are large, black, or black-and-white, with long wings and deeply forked tails. The males have coloured inflatable throat pouches. They do not swim or walk and cannot take off from a flat surface. Having the largest wingspan-to-body-weight ratio of any bird, they are essentially aerial, able to stay aloft for more than a week.

- Lesser frigatebird, Fregata ariel
- Great frigatebird, Fregata minor

== Boobies and gannets ==
Order: Suliformes Family: Sulidae

The sulids comprise the gannets and boobies. Both groups are medium-large coastal seabirds that plunge-dive for fish.

- Masked booby, Sula dactylatra
- Brown booby, Sula leucogaster
- Red-footed booby, Sula sula (A)
- Australasian gannet, Morus serrator

== Cormorants and shags ==
Order: Suliformes Family: Phalacrocoracidae

Phalacrocoracidae is a family of medium to large coastal, fish-eating seabirds that includes cormorants and shags. Plumage colouration varies, with the majority having mainly dark plumage, some species being black-and-white and a few being colourful.

- Little pied cormorant, Microcarbo melanoleucos (A)
- Great cormorant, Phalacrocorax carbo (A)
- Little black cormorant, Phalacrocorax sulcirostris (A)

== Pelicans ==
Order: Pelecaniformes Family: Pelecanidae

Pelicans are large water birds with distinctive pouches under their bills. Like other birds in the order Pelecaniformes, they have four webbed toes.

- Australian pelican, Pelecanus conspicillatus (A)

== Herons, egrets, and bitterns ==
Order: Pelecaniformes Family: Ardeidae

The family Ardeidae contains the bitterns, herons and egrets. Herons and egrets are medium to large wading birds with long necks and legs. Bitterns tend to be shorter necked and more wary. Members of Ardeidae fly with their necks retracted, unlike other long-necked birds such as storks, ibises and spoonbills.

- Pacific heron, Ardea pacifica (A)
- Great egret, Ardea alba (A)
- Intermediate egret, Ardea intermedia (A)
- White-faced heron, Egretta novaehollandiae
- Little egret, Egretta garzetta (A)
- Cattle egret, Bubulcus ibis (A)

== Ibises and spoonbills ==
Order: Pelecaniformes Family: Threskiornithidae

Threskiornithidae is a family of large terrestrial and wading birds which includes the ibises and spoonbills. They have long, broad wings with 11 primary and about 20 secondary feathers. They are strong fliers and despite their size and weight, very capable soarers.

- Glossy ibis, Plegadis falcinellus
- Australian ibis, Threskiornis molucca (A)
- Straw-necked ibis, Plegadis falcinellus (A)
- Royal spoonbill, Platalea regia (A)
- Yellow-billed spoonbill, Platalea flavipes (A)

== Hawks, eagles, and kites ==
Order: Accipitriformes Family: Accipitridae

Accipitridae is a family of birds of prey, which includes hawks, eagles, kites, harriers and Old World vultures. These birds have powerful hooked beaks for tearing flesh from their prey, strong legs, powerful talons and keen eyesight.

- Swamp harrier, Circus approximans
- Brown goshawk, Accipiter fasciatus (A)

== Barn-owls ==
Order: Strigiformes Family: Tytonidae

Barn-owls are medium to large owls with large heads and characteristic heart-shaped faces. They have long strong legs with powerful talons.

- Barn owl, Tyto alba (A)

== Owls ==
Order: Strigiformes Family: Strigidae

The typical owls are small to large solitary nocturnal birds of prey. They have large forward-facing eyes and ears, a hawk-like beak and a conspicuous circle of feathers around each eye called a facial disk.

- Morepork, Ninox novaeseelandiae

== Kingfishers ==
Order: Coraciiformes Family: Alcedinidae

Kingfishers are medium-sized birds with large heads, long, pointed bills, short legs and stubby tails.

- Forest kingfisher, Todiramphus macleayii (A)
- Sacred kingfisher, Todiramphus sanctus

== Rollers ==
Order: Coraciiformes Family: Coraciidae

Rollers resemble crows in size and build, but are more closely related to the kingfishers and bee-eaters. They share the colourful appearance of those groups with blues and browns predominating. The two inner front toes are connected, but the outer toe is not.

- Dollarbird, Eurystomus orientalis (A)

== Falcons and caracaras ==
Order: Falconiformes Family: Falconidae

Falconidae is a family of diurnal birds of prey. They differ from hawks, eagles, and kites in that they kill with their beaks instead of their talons.

- Nankeen kestrel, Falco cenchroides

== New Zealand parrots ==
Order: Psittaciformes Family: Strigopidae

The New Zealand parrot superfamily, Strigopoidea, consists of at least three genera of parrots – Nestor, Strigops, the fossil Nelepsittacus, and probably the fossil Heracles. The genus Nestor consists of the kea, kākā, Norfolk Island kākā and Chatham kākā, while the genus Strigops contains the iconic kākāpō. All extant species are endemic to New Zealand. The species of the genus Nelepsittacus were endemics of the main islands, while the two extinct species of the genus Nestor were found at the nearby oceanic islands such as Chatham Island of New Zealand, and Norfolk Island and adjacent Phillip Island.

- Norfolk Island kākā, Nestor productus (E) extinct

== Old World parrots ==
Order: Psittaciformes Family: Psittaculidae

Characteristic features of parrots include a strong curved bill, an upright stance, strong legs, and clawed zygodactyl feet. Many parrots are vividly colored, and some are multi-colored. In size they range from 8 cm (3.1 in) to 1 m (3.3 ft) in length. Old World parrots are found from Africa east across south and southeast Asia and Oceania to Australia and New Zealand.

- Norfolk Island parakeet, Cyanoramphus cookii (E)
- Crimson rosella, Platycercus elegans (I)
- Scaly-breasted lorikeet, Trichoglossus chlorolepidotus (A)

== Thornbills and allies ==
Order: Passeriformes Family: Acanthizidae

Thornbills are small passerine birds, similar in habits to the tits.

- Norfolk Island gerygone, Gerygone modesta (E)

== Cuckooshrikes ==
Order: Passeriformes Family: Campephagidae

The cuckooshrikes are small to medium-sized passerine birds. They are predominantly greyish with white and black, although some species are brightly coloured.

- Black-faced cuckooshrike, Coracina novaehollandiae (A)

== Whistlers and allies ==
Order: Passeriformes Family: Pachycephalidae

The family Pachycephalidae includes the whistlers, shrikethrushes, and some of the pitohuis.

- Golden whistler, Pachycephala pectoralis

== Woodswallows, bellmagpies, and allies ==
Order: Passeriformes Family: Artamidae

The woodswallows are soft-plumaged, somber-coloured passerine birds. They are smooth, agile flyers with moderately large, semi-triangular wings. The cracticids: currawongs, bellmagpies and butcherbirds, are similar to the other corvids. They have large, straight bills and mostly black, white or grey plumage. All are omnivorous to some degree.

- Masked woodswallow, Artamus personatus (A)
- White-browed woodswallow, Artamus superciliosus (A)

== Fantails ==
Order: Passeriformes Family: Rhipiduridae

The fantails are small insectivorous birds which are specialist aerial feeders.

- Gray fantail, Rhipidura albiscapa

== Australasian robins ==
Order: Passeriformes Family: Petroicidae

Most species of Petroicidae have a stocky build with a large rounded head, a short straight bill and rounded wingtips. They occupy a wide range of wooded habitats, from subalpine to tropical rainforest, and mangrove swamp to semi-arid scrubland. All are primarily insectivores, although a few supplement their diet with seeds.

- Norfolk robin, Petroica multicolor (E)

== Swallows ==
Order: Passeriformes Family: Hirundinidae

The family Hirundinidae is adapted to aerial feeding. They have a slender streamlined body, long pointed wings, and a short bill with a wide gape. The feet are adapted to perching rather than walking, and the front toes are partially joined at the base.

- Welcome swallow, Hirundo neoxena

== White-eyes, yuhinas, and allies ==
Order: Passeriformes Family: Zosteropidae

The white-eyes are small birds of rather drab appearance, the plumage above being typically greenish-olive, but some species have a white or bright yellow throat, breast, or lower parts, and several have buff flanks. As the name suggests, many species have a white ring around each eye.

- Silver-eye, Zosterops lateralis
- Slender-billed white-eye, Zosterops tenuirostris (E)

== Starlings ==
Order: Passeriformes Family: Sturnidae

Starlings are small to medium-sized passerine birds. Their flight is strong and direct and they are very gregarious. Their preferred habitat is fairly open country. They eat insects and fruit. Plumage is typically dark with a metallic sheen.

- European starling, Sturnus vulgaris (I)

== Thrushes and allies ==
Order: Passeriformes Family: Turdidae

The thrushes are a group of passerine birds that occur mainly in the Old World. They are plump, soft plumaged, small to medium-sized insectivores or sometimes omnivores, often feeding on the ground. Many have attractive songs.

- Song thrush, Turdus philomelos (I)
- Eurasian blackbird, Turdus merula (I)

== Old World sparrows ==
Order: Passeriformes Family: Passeridae

Old World sparrows are small passerine birds, typically small, plump, brown or grey with short tails and short powerful beaks. They are seed-eaters, but also consume small insects.

- House sparrow, Passer domesticus (I)

== Finches, euphonias, and allies ==
Order: Passeriformes Family: Fringillidae

Finches are small to moderately large seed-eating passerine birds with a strong beak, usually conical and in some species very large. All have 12 tail feathers and nine primary flight feathers. Finches have a bouncing flight, alternating bouts of flapping with gliding on closed wings, and most sing well.

- Common chaffinch, Fringilla coelebs (A)
- European greenfinch, Chloris chloris (I)
- Common redpoll, Acanthis flammea (I)
- Lesser redpoll, Acanthis cabaret (I)
- European goldfinch, Carduelis carduelis (I)

== See also ==
- List of birds
- Lists of birds by region
