= List of Strigopoidea =

Of the nine species in the New Zealand parrot superfamily Strigopoidea, the Norfolk kākā and Chatham kākā became extinct in recent history. The last known individual of the Norfolk Kākā died in its cage in London sometime after 1851, and only between seven and 20 skins survive. The Chatham Kākā became extinct in pre-European times, after Polynesians settled the island, between 1550 and 1700, and is only known from subfossil bones. Of the surviving species, the kākāpō is critically endangered, with living individuals numbering only 236 (as of 2026). The mainland kākā is listed as endangered, and the kea is listed as vulnerable. The Nestoridae genus Nelepsittacus consists of four extinct species.

== Species list ==
=== Nestoridae ===
There are two surviving species and at least one well documented extinct species of the family Nestoridae. Very little is known about the Chatham Kākā, and it may have been con-specific with another Kākā species, or a separate species belonging to the genus.

Nestorini
Common name (binomial name) status	Image	Description	Range and habitat
Kea (Nestor notabilis); Vulnerable		48 cm (19 in) long. Mostly olive-green with scarlet underwings and rump. Dark-edged feathers. Dark brown beak, iris, legs, and feet. Male has longer bill.	New Zealand: South Island High-level forests and subalpine scrublands 850–1400 m AMSL.
South Island kākā (Nestor meridionalis meridionalis); Endangered		Similar to the North Island kaka, but slightly smaller, brighter colours, the crown is almost white, and the bill is longer and more arched in males.	New Zealand: South Island Unbroken tracts of Nothofagus and Podocarpus forests 450–850 m AMSL in summer and 0–550 m in winter.
North Island kākā (Nestor meridionalis septentrionalis); Endangered		About 45 cm (18 in) long. Mainly olive-brown with dark feather edges. Crimson underwings, rump, and collar. The cheeks are golden/brown. The crown is greyish.	New Zealand: North Island Unbroken tracts of Nothofagus and Podocarpus forests between 450 and 850 m AMSL in summer and 0–550 m in winter.
Norfolk kākā (Nestor productus); Extinct by 1851 approx.		About 38 cm long. Mostly olive-brown upperparts, (reddish-)orange cheeks and throat, straw-coloured breast, thighs, rump and lower abdomen dark orange.	Formerly endemic on Norfolk Island and Phillip Island of Australia Rocks and trees
Chatham kākā (Nestor chathamensis); Extinct by 1550–1700	Appearance unknown, but bones indicate reduced flight capability.	Only known from subfossil bones.	Formerly endemic on Chatham Island of New Zealand Forests

=== Strigopidae ===
The kākāpō is the only member of the family Strigopidae.

Strigopini
Common name (binomial name) status	Image	Description	Range and habitat
Kākāpō (Strigops habroptilus); Critically endangered		Large rotund parrots 58–64 cm (23–25 in) long; males are larger than females and weigh 2–4 kg (4.5–9 lb) at maturity. Mostly green with brown and yellow mottled barring, the underparts being greenish-yellow. Its face is pale and owl-like.	New Zealand: Maud, Chalky, Codfish and Anchor Islands Climax Nothofagus (beech) and Podocarpus (conifer) forests, regenerating subalpine scrub, snow tussock Danthonia grassland 10–1400 m AMSL.
