= Strigops insulaborealis =

Strigops insulaborealis Temporal range: Calabrian

Scientific classification
- Kingdom: Animalia
- Phylum: Chordata
- Class: Aves
- Order: Psittaciformes
- Family: Strigopidae
- Genus: Strigops
- Species: S. insulaborealis

Binomial name
- Strigops insulaborealis Worthy et al., 2026

Extinct species of Strigops

Strigops insulaborealis is an extinct species of New Zealand parrot in the genus Strigops that lived in Zealandia during the Calabrian stage of the Pleistocene epoch.

== Etymology ==
The specific epithet of Strigops insulaborealis is composed of the Latin words insula, meaning island, and borealis, meaning northern. This is in reference to its holotype being found on the North Island of New Zealand.
