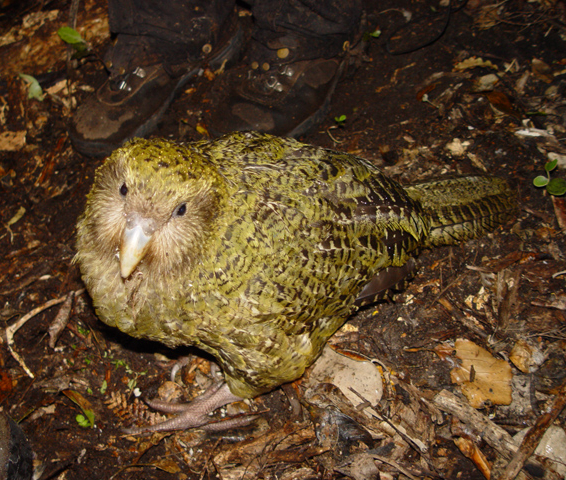
- Kākāpō (Strigops habroptilus)

Scientific classification
- Kingdom: Animalia
- Phylum: Chordata
- Class: Aves
- Order: Psittaciformes
- Family: Strigopidae
- Genus: Strigops; G.R. Gray, 1845

Species
- Strigops habroptilus Gray, 1845; †Strigops insulaborealis Worthy et al., 2026

= Strigops =

Strigops Temporal range: Pleistocene–Recent

Genus of birds

Strigops is a genus of New Zealand parrots that contains two species, an extant species, the kākāpō (Strigops habroptilus) and the fossil species Strigops insulaborealis from the early Pleistocene of New Zealand.
