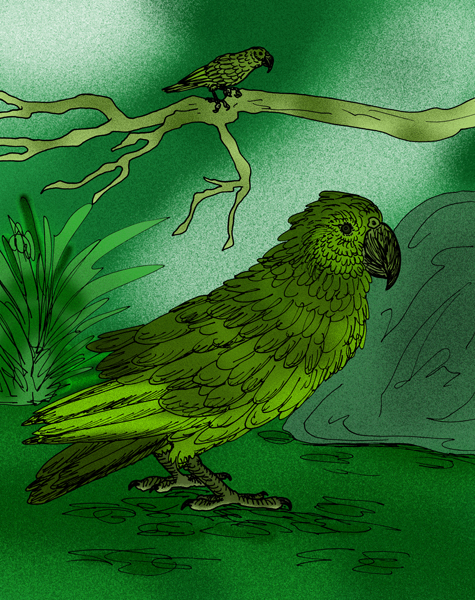
- Life restoration of H. inexpectatus comparison to an Nelepsittacus minimus

Scientific classification
- Kingdom: Animalia
- Phylum: Chordata
- Class: Aves
- Order: Psittaciformes
- Genus: †Heracles; Worthy et al, 2019
- Species: †H. inexpectatus

Binomial name
- †Heracles inexpectatus Worthy, Hand, Archer, et al, 2019

= Heracles inexpectatus =

Heracles inexpectatus Temporal range: Burdigalian 19–16 Ma

Extinct species of bird

Heracles inexpectatus is a giant fossil parrot species from New Zealand, assigned to a monotypic genus Heracles, that lived during the early Miocene approximately 16 to 19 million years ago. The species was described from two tibiotarsus fossils discovered in 2008 at Saint Bathans, Otago, New Zealand. It is believed that the species stood up to 90 cm (2 ft 11 in) tall and weighed approximately 7 kg (15 lb). Initial analysis suggests that this parrot is from the order Psittaciformes and from the superfamily Strigopoidea, which consists of three confirmed primitive genera of parrots: Nestor (kea and kākā), Strigops (kākāpō) and the fossil Nelepsittacus. It may have been the ancestor of the kākāpō.

The species was likely flightless, and its robust beak could crack open more than the conventional parrot foods of fruit, nuts, and berries. Like the kākāpō, Heracles may have used its strong beak to climb trees. It shared its environment with five other species of parrot in the genus Nelepsittacus, as well as dozens of other bird species in the St Bathans Fauna. Heracles inexpectatus is the largest parrot known to have existed. Media releases described the new species as the "Hercules parrot" and reported the nickname given by the palaeontologist Mike Archer of "Squawkzilla".

== Taxonomy ==
The description of a new species and genus was published in 2019, emerging from research undertaken by Trevor Worthy, Suzanne Hand, Mike Archer, R. Paul Scofield and Vanesa L. De Pietri. Alan Tennyson's and Te Papa's key role in this discovery was later acknowledged in a correction published in 2021.

Heracles inexpectatus was described from two incomplete tibiotarsi (leg bones), a left one and a right one, probably from the same individual, that were discovered in 2008. The left bone was nominated as the holotype. The fossils were originally presumed to be from an eagle, but were re-inspected after a PhD student at Flinders University noted that the bone morphology was significantly different from typical eagles.

The etymology of the generic epithet Heracles alludes to the earlier naming of a genus, Nelepsittacus, also found in the St Bathan Fauna, which referred to a mythical king Neleus who was slain by the Greek hero Herakles, who also slew all of his sons, save for Nestor. The authors distinguished the new species with the epithet inexpectatus to describe their astonishment at the unexpected discovery of an enormous parrot-like bird from the Miocene epoch.

The etymology of the nickname "Squawkzilla" is a portmanteau of the words "squawk", an onomatopoeic word for the sound of a parrot, and "-zilla", a suffix denoting large size, derived from the fictional giant creature Godzilla.

== Description ==
The largest known species of Psittaciformes, which comprises the modern parrots and cockatoos, it is estimated to have been around one meter in height, with a body mass of seven kilograms, and presumed to have been flightless, terrestrial and perhaps arboreal. Island gigantism has been observed in other orders of birds, especially in New Zealand and Fiji, but this species exceeds the proportions of any extant or fossil species of the parrot order. The previously known record for size was the arboreal and nocturnal Strigops habroptilus, the kākāpō of modern New Zealand.

The fossilised tarsi were deposited in a rich and mixed assemblage of animal remains, including other large species of Aves such as the moa, anatids and an eagle, the bones of which are usually fragmented. The type material of Heracles inexpectatus is the longest evidence obtained at the site, which rarely produces fossil longer than 100 millimeters. The time of deposition is determined as sixteen to nineteen million years ago, in an area associated with a freshwater lacustrine system, in wet forest dominated by cycad, palm and casuarina species, along with a diverse array of other avian fauna. The species appears to have occupied a niche in the region's ecology, unfilled by mammals, that favoured the insular gigantism exhibited by some other avian species of the region.

== Environment ==
The climate in New Zealand was similar to nowadays (temperate) and may have been subject to periodic droughts. Summer season (December to February) had average daytime temperatures between 20 and 25 °C (68 and 77 °F) and a humidity around 80%. Winter season (June to August) had average daytime temperatures ranging from 12 to 16 °C (54 to 61 °F) and a humidity around 67%.

== Paleontology ==
The tibia fossils were discovered in a trench excavation of the foot of hills 50 meters east from the river bank of the Manuherikia River in Home Hills Station, Otago, NZ. These fossils were collected on 14 January in 2008.
