= Chatham kākā =

Chatham kākā Temporal range: Holocene

Conservation status
- Extinct (between 1500 and 1650) (IUCN 3.1)

Scientific classification
- Kingdom: Animalia
- Phylum: Chordata
- Class: Aves
- Order: Psittaciformes
- Family: Strigopidae
- Genus: Nestor
- Species: †N. chathamensis

Binomial name
- †Nestor chathamensis Wood, Mitchell, Scofield and Tennyson, 2014

Extinct species of bird

The Chatham kākā or Chatham Island kākā (Nestor chathamensis) is an extinct parrot species previously found on the Chatham Islands, New Zealand. The first individuals were thought to belong to the New Zealand kākā (Nestor meridionalis), but detailed examination of the subfossil bones showed that they actually belong to a separate endemic species. The species became extinct within the first 150 years of the arrival of the Polynesians around 1500, long before any European settlers. No skins or descriptions are available.

== Taxonomy ==
The Chatham kākā is assigned to the genus Nestor in the family Nestoridae, a small group of parrot species native to New Zealand. It is considered to have been more closely related to the kākā (Nestor meridionalis) and the extinct Norfolk kākā (Nestor productus) than to the kea (Nestor notabilis).

== Ecology ==
The Chatham kākā was a forest dwelling species of about the same size as the North Island subspecies of the kākā, Nestor meridionalis septentrionalis. However, it had a much broader pelvis, enlarged legs, and a beak that was intermediate between kea and kākā. It had no natural predators (as it was bigger than the New Zealand falcon) and, as is often observed with such island endemics, it is believed to have been a poor flyer. This may have made it more vulnerable to human hunting by the Polynesians.
