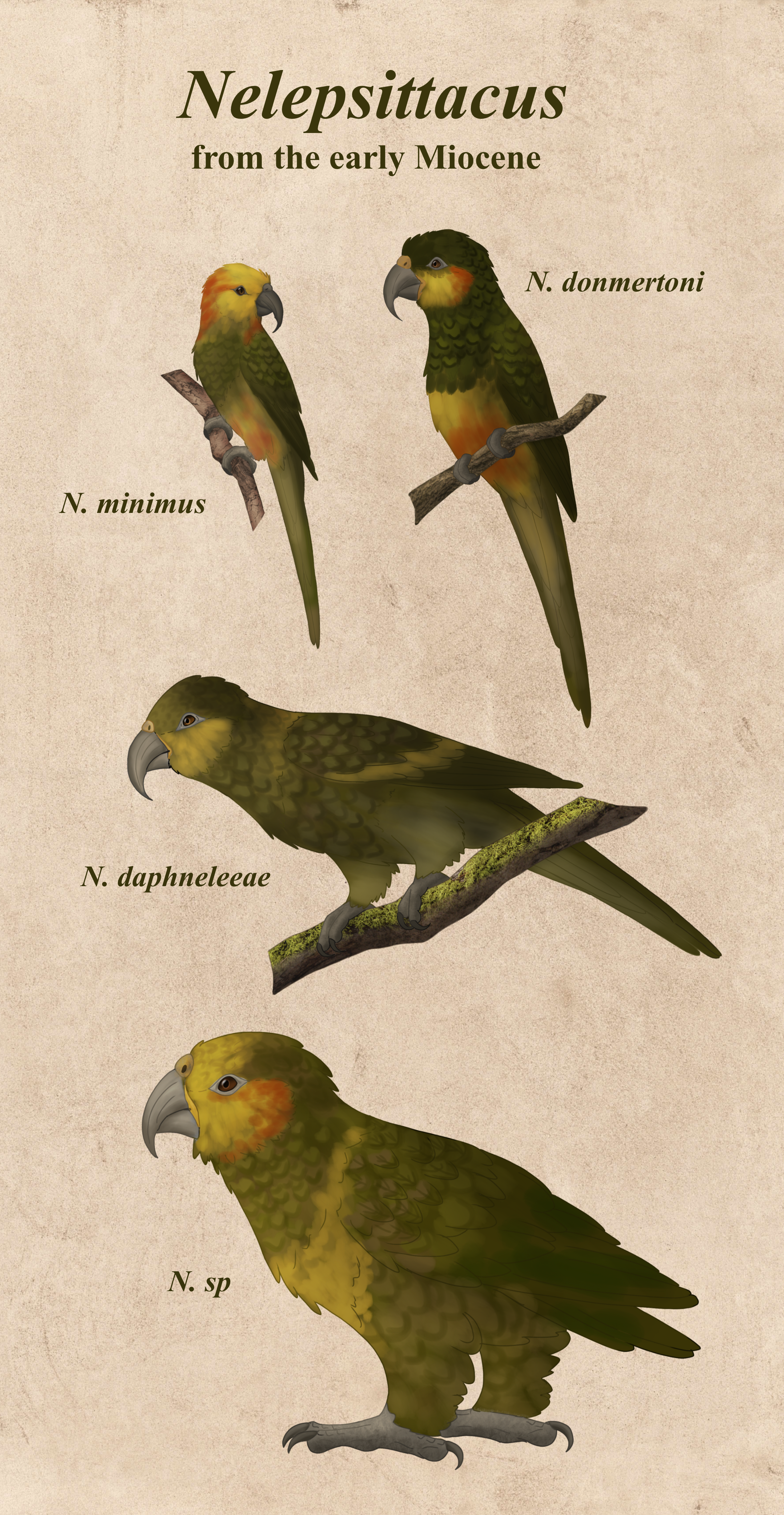

Scientific classification
- Kingdom: Animalia
- Phylum: Chordata
- Class: Aves
- Order: Psittaciformes
- Family: Strigopidae
- Genus: †Nelepsittacus; Worthy, Tennyson, Scoffeld 2011

Species
- N. daphneleeae N. donmertoni N. minimus N. sp.

= Nelepsittacus =

Nelepsittacus Temporal range: Early Miocene

Extinct genus of birds

Nelepsittacus is a genus of extinct New Zealand parrots that is closely related to the genus Nestor (the living kākā and kea). It consists of four species, of which three have been named so far. The species are all known from the early Miocene Saint Bathans Fauna from the Lower Bannockburn Formation in Otago in New Zealand.

Features in their skeletons, namely the coracoid, humerus, tibiotarsus, and tarsometatarsus, that they share only with the Nestor parrots link them to that genus.

Flora from the Saint Bathans fauna fossil beds indicate these parrots were found in a subtropical rainforest habitat. Following the early to mid Miocene, there was a drop in temperature, which led to a loss of local flora and fauna. This loss of native Nelepsittacus parrots likely spurred the proliferation of Cyanoramphus parrots, a more recent migrant from the southwest Pacific.

The largest known fossil species of parrot, Heracles inexpectatus, was described in 2019 from bones also identified as early Miocene St Bathans fauna. The generic epithet Heracles was named as an allusion to this genus, in one mythic tradition the Greek hero Herakles slew the king Neleus.

== Discovery and naming ==
The parrots of the Nelepsittacus genus were first described by Trevor H. Worthy, Alan Tennyson and Paul Scofield in 2011. Most of the fossils of these parrots were found on the banks of the Manuherikia River in Otago, New Zealand.

The genus is named for the Greek mythological figure Neleus who was the father of Nestor, reflecting the relationship between the genus and the extant Nestor.

== Species ==
(Listed in order of description)

=== Nelepsittacus minimus ===
The type species, N. minimus is the smallest of the three (possibly four) species

=== Nelepsittacus donmertoni ===
Nelepsittacus donmertoni is the next-smallest species, and its bones indicate it was about the same size as the crimson rosella (Platycercus elegans) of eastern Australia. Their mandibles are noted to bear more similarities to that of Strigops (the kākāpō) than Nestor.

N. donmertoni was named in honor of the late Don Merton, who was instrumental in saving the kākāpō.

=== Nelepsittacus daphneleeae ===
N. daphneleeae is about a quarter larger than the previously mentioned N. donmertoni. The humerus and ulna of this parrot suggest it was a little bigger than the Australian king parrot (Alisterus scapularis), but a little smaller than a galah (Eolophus roseicapillus). While it shares many skeletal similarities with the two previously mentioned species, N. daphneleeae is only tentatively classified as Nelepsittacus because of an inadequate representation of the tarsometatarsus.

N. daphneleeae was named in honor of geologist Daphne Lee for her contribution to the knowledge of Miocene terrestrial ecosystems in New Zealand.

=== Nelepsittacus sp. ===
The last species, so far undescribed and known only from a left scapula and humerus, is around the same size as a kea (Nestor notabilis).
