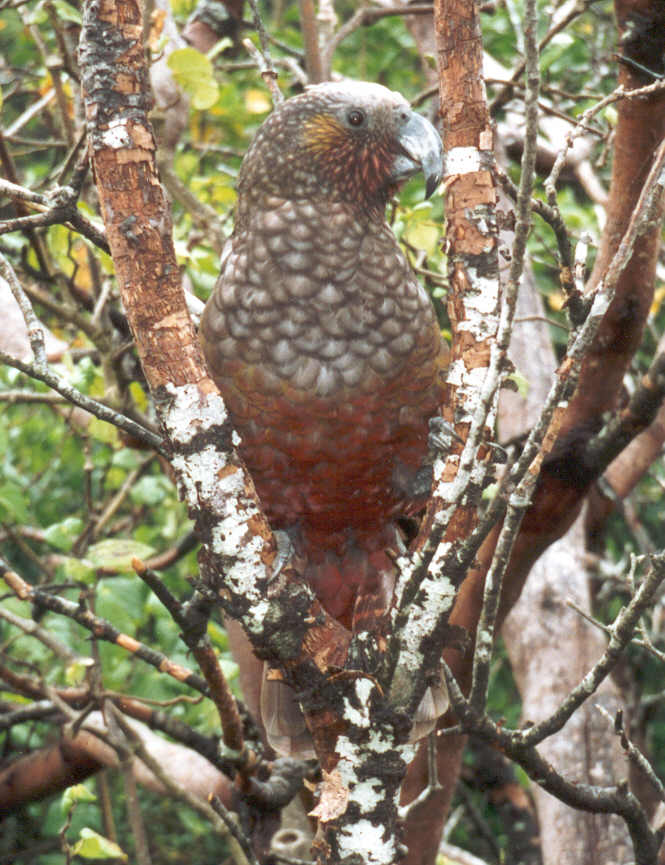
- New Zealand kākā (Nestor meridionalis)

Scientific classification
- Kingdom: Animalia
- Phylum: Chordata
- Class: Aves
- Order: Psittaciformes
- Family: Strigopidae
- Genus: Nestor; Lesson, 1830

Type species
- Psittacus nestor Latham, 1790

Species
- N. notabilis Kea; N. meridionalis Kākā †N. productus Norfolk kākā †N. chathamensis Chatham kākā

= Nestor (bird) =

Genus of birds

The genus Nestor is one of the two extant genera of the parrot family Strigopidae. Together with the kākāpō, and the extinct parrots in the genus Nelepsittacus, they form the parrot superfamily Strigopoidea. The genus Nestor contains two extant parrot species from New Zealand and two extinct species from Norfolk Island, Australia and Chatham Island, New Zealand, respectively. All species are large stocky birds with short squarish tails. A defining characteristic of the genus is the tongue, which is tipped with a hair-like fringe. The superficial resemblance of this tongue to that of lorikeets has led some taxonomists to consider the two groups closely related, but DNA evidence shows they are not.

== Classification ==
All four species in the genus Nestor are thought to stem from a 'proto-kākā', dwelling in the forests of New Zealand 5 million years ago. The closest living relative of the genus is the kākāpō (Strigops habroptilus). Together, they form the Strigopoidea, an ancient group that split off from all other Psittaciformes before their radiation.

In 2012 Leo Joseph and collaborators proposed that the genus Nestor should be placed in its own family, Nestoridae. This proposal has not been adopted in lists of the world birds and instead Nestor is placed with the genus Strigops in the family Strigopidae.

== Species ==
There are two surviving species and at least one well documented extinct species in the genus Nestor. Very little is known about the fourth, the Chatham kākā, which may have been conspecific with another kākā species.

- Kea, Nestor notabilis
- Kākā, Nestor meridionalis
  - North Island kākā, Nestor meridionalis septentrionalis
  - South Island kākā, Nestor meridionalis meridionalis
- †Norfolk kākā, Nestor productus (extinct)
- †Chatham kākā, Nestor chathamensis (extinct)

Nestoridae
Common name (binomial name) status	Image	Description	Range and habitat
Kea (Nestor notabilis); Endangered		48 cm (19 in) long. Mostly olive-green with scarlet underwings and rump. Dark-edged feathers. Dark brown beak, iris, legs, and feet. Male has longer bill.	New Zealand: South Island High-level forests and subalpine scrublands 850–1400 m AMSL.
South Island kākā (Nestor meridionalis meridionalis); Endangered		Similar to the North Island kākā, but slightly smaller, brighter colours, the crown is almost white, and the bill is longer and more arched in males.	New Zealand: South Island Unbroken tracts of Nothofagus and Podocarpus forests 450–850 m AMSL in summer and 0–550 m in winter.
North Island kākā (Nestor meridionalis septentrionalis); Endangered		About 45 cm (18 in) long. Mainly olive-brown with dark feather edges. Crimson underwings, rump, and collar. The cheeks are golden/brown. The crown is greyish.	New Zealand: North Island Unbroken tracts of Nothofagus and Podocarpus forests between 450–850 m AMSL in summer and 0–550 m in winter.
Norfolk kākā (†Nestor productus); Extinct by 1851 approx.		About 38 cm long. Mostly olive-brown upperparts, (reddish-)orange cheeks and throat, straw-coloured breast, thighs, rump and lower abdomen dark orange.	Formerly endemic on Norfolk Island and the adjacent Phillip Island Rocks and trees
Chatham kākā (†Nestor chathamensis); Extinct by 1550–1700		Only known from subfossil bones.	Formerly endemic on Chatham Island of New Zealand Forests

== Status ==
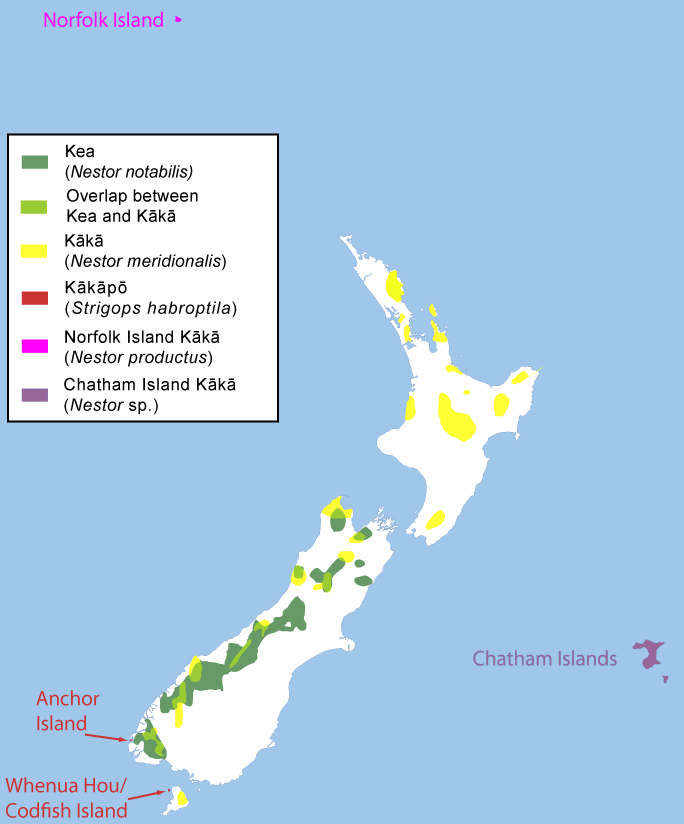
Current distribution of extant species, as well as previous distribution of extinct island species

Of the four species, the Norfolk kākā and Chatham kākā became extinct in recent history. The last known individual of the Norfolk kākā died in captivity in London sometime after 1851, and only between seven and 20 skins survive. The Chatham kākā became extinct in pre-European times, after Polynesians arrived at the island, between 1550 and 1700, and is only known from subfossil bones. The mainland kākā is listed as endangered, and the kea is listed as vulnerable.
