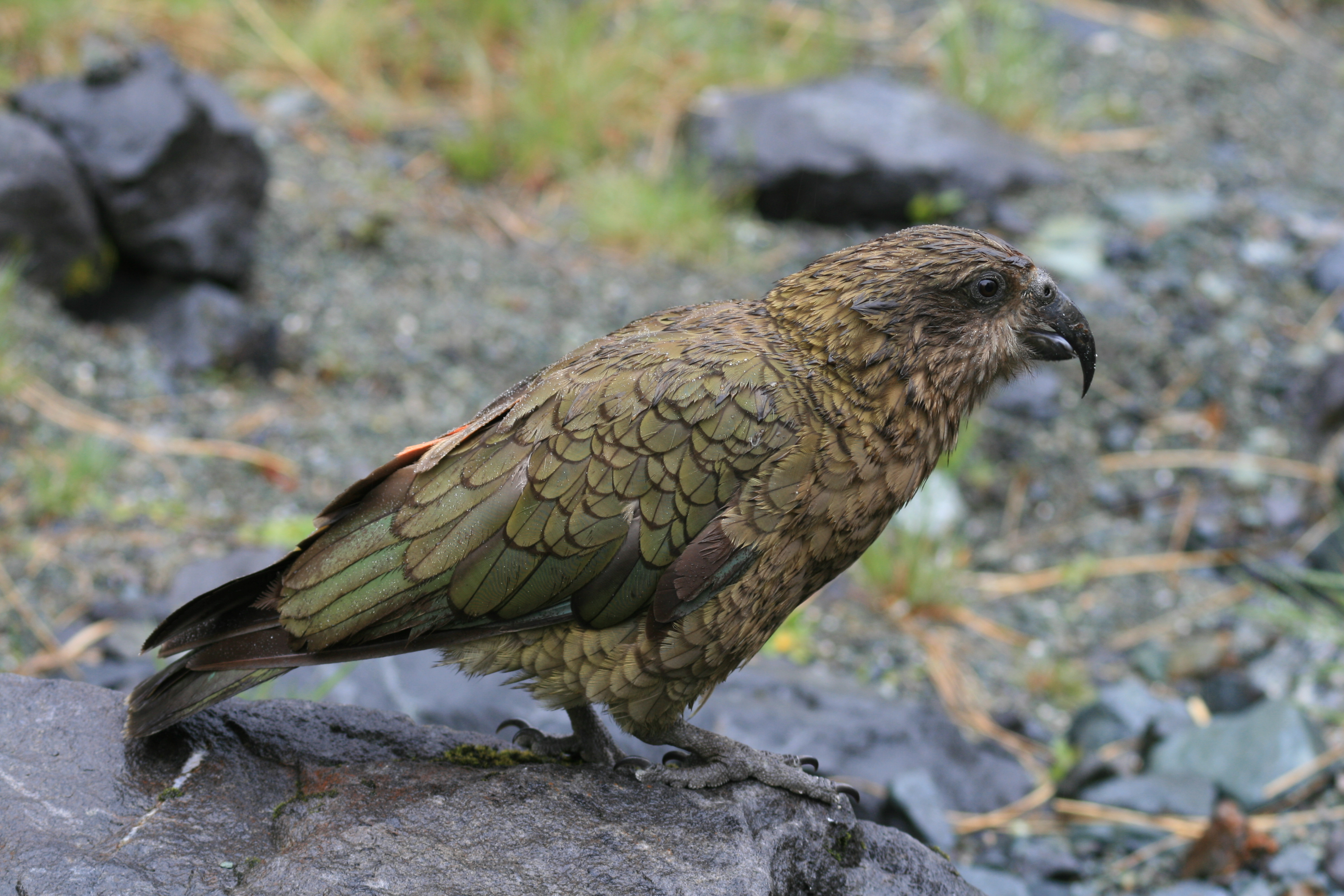
- An adult kea in Fiordland

Conservation status
- Endangered (IUCN 3.1)
- CITES Appendix II

Scientific classification
- Kingdom: Animalia
- Phylum: Chordata
- Class: Aves
- Order: Psittaciformes
- Family: Strigopidae
- Genus: Nestor
- Species: N. notabilis

Binomial name
- Nestor notabilis Gould, 1856
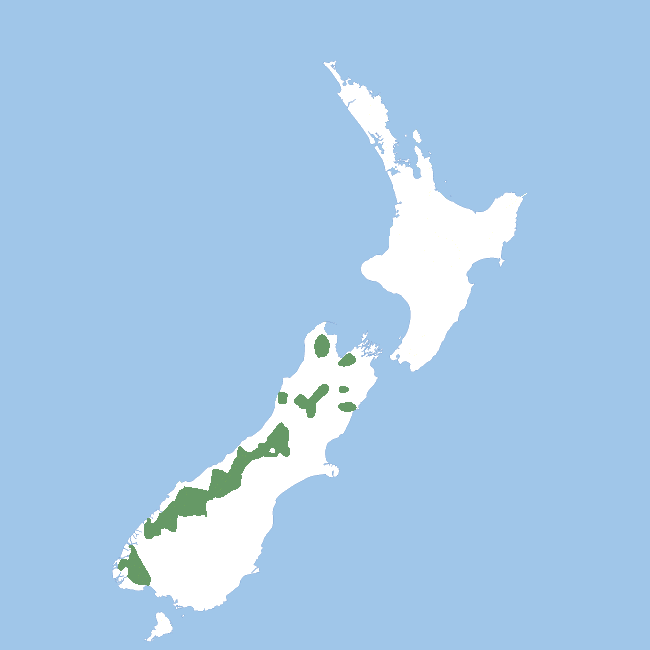
- Range in green, New Zealand

Audio
- Recording of a kea

= Kea =

Species of bird endemic to New Zealand

The kea (/ˈkiːə/ KEE-ə; Māori: [kɛ.a]; Nestor notabilis) is a species of large parrot in the family Strigopidae that is endemic to the forested and alpine regions of the South Island of New Zealand. About 48 cm (19 in) long, it is mostly olive-green, with brilliant orange under its wings, and has a large, narrow, curved, grey-brown upper beak. Its omnivorous diet consists mainly of roots, leaves, berries, nectar, and insects, but also includes carrion. It was once killed for bounty due to concern by sheep farmers that it attacked livestock, especially sheep. The kea is now uncommon, and received absolute protection under the Wildlife Act in 1986.

The kea nests in burrows or crevices among the roots of trees. Kea are known for their intelligence and curiosity, both vital to their survival in a harsh mountain environment. Kea can solve logical puzzles, such as pushing and pulling things in a certain order to get to food, and will work together to achieve a certain objective. They have been filmed preparing and using tools.

== Taxonomy and naming ==
The kea was described by ornithologist John Gould in 1856, from two specimens shown to him by Walter Mantell, who obtained the birds in Murihiku. Eight years earlier, some elderly Māori had told Mantell about the bird, and how it used to visit the coast in winter but had not been seen in recent times. Mantell subsequently investigated and obtained the birds.

The kea's Latin binomial specific epithet, notabilis, means 'noteworthy'. The common name kea is from Māori, probably an onomatopoeic representation of their in-flight call – 'keee aaa'. In New Zealand English, the word 'kea' is both singular and plural. The collective noun is a circus or conspiracy of kea.

The genus Nestor contains four species: the New Zealand kākā (Nestor meridionalis), the kea (N. notabilis), the extinct Norfolk kākā (N. productus), and the extinct Chatham kākā (N. chathamensis). All four are thought to stem from a "proto-kākā", dwelling in the forests of New Zealand five million years ago. Their closest relative is the flightless kākāpō (Strigops habroptilus). Together, they form the parrot superfamily Strigopoidea, an ancient group that split off from all other Psittacidae before their radiation.

== Description ==
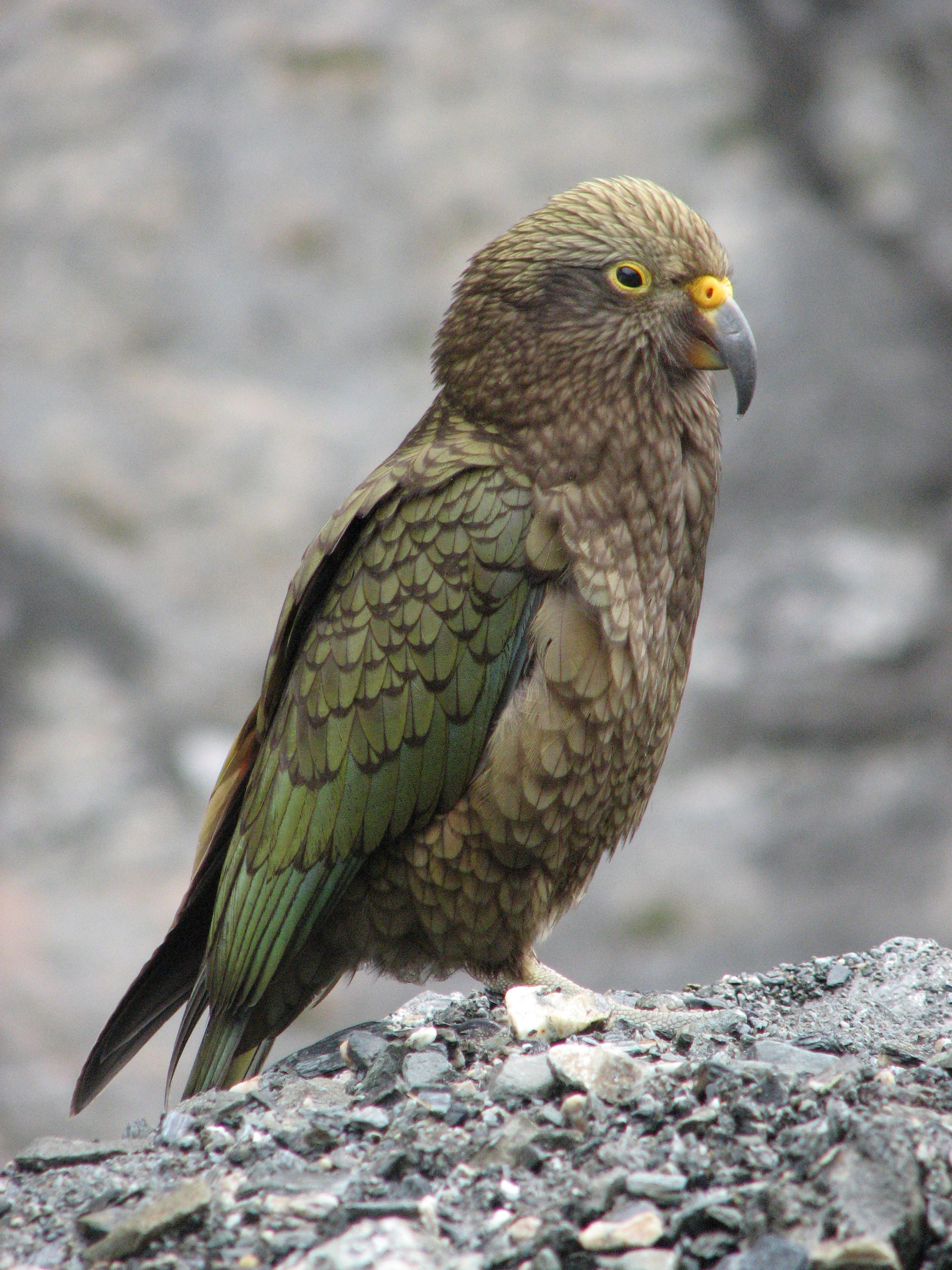
Juveniles have yellow eyerings and cere, an orange-yellow lower beak, and grey-yellow legs.

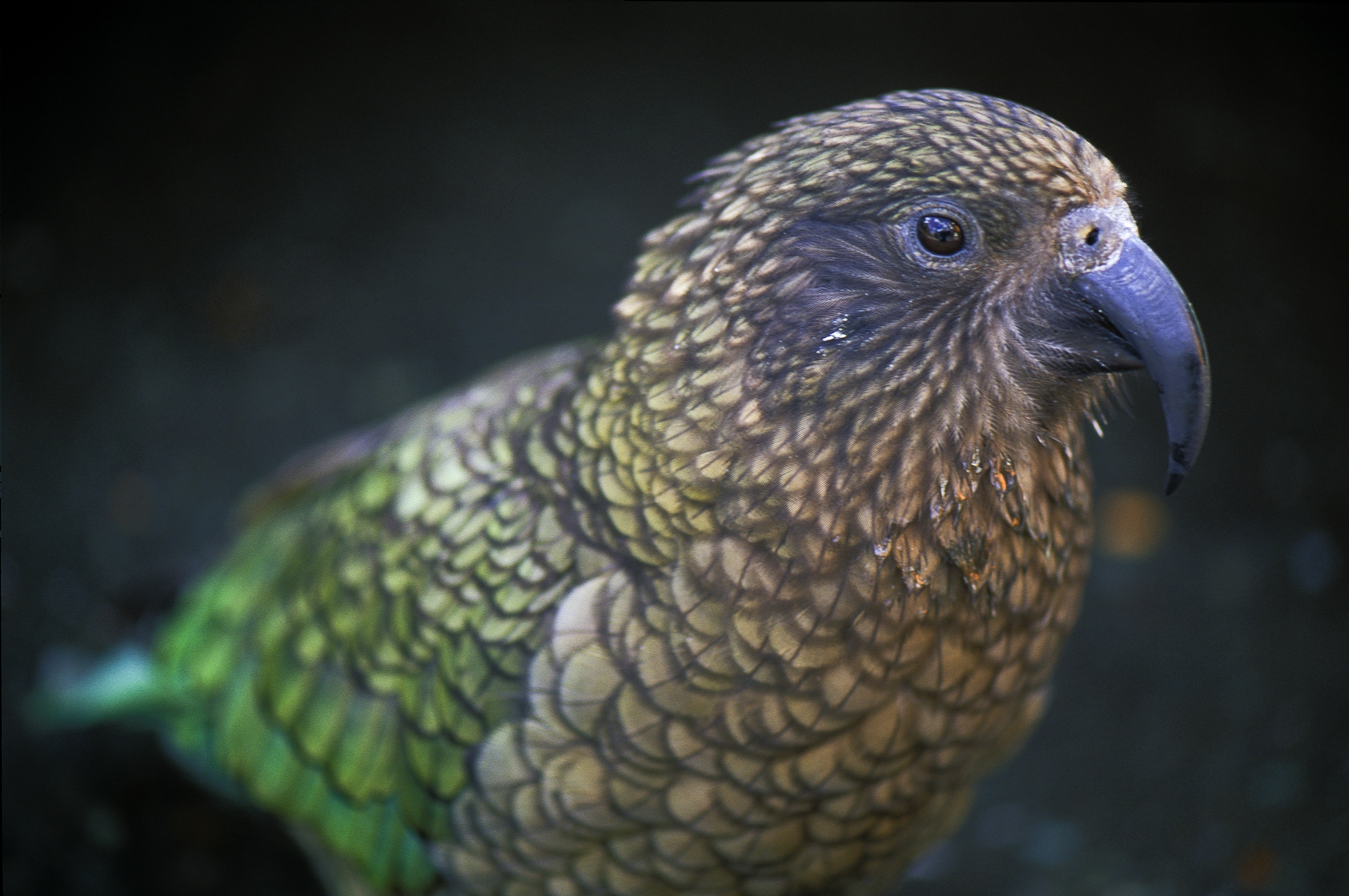
Adult kea close-up at Milford Sound

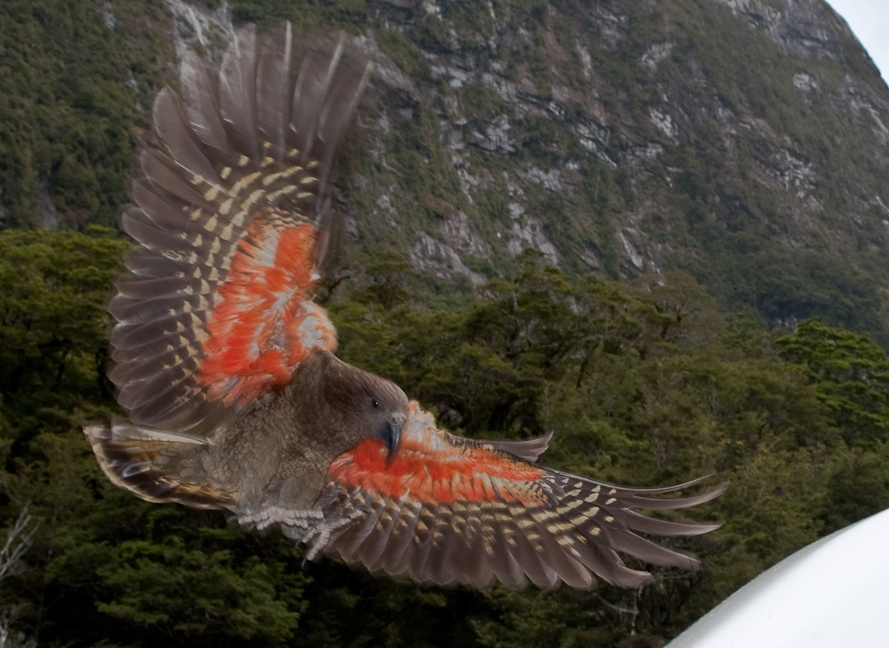
Orange feathers can be seen under the wing during flight.

The kea is a large parrot measuring 46 to 50 cm (18 to 20 in) in length, with some specimens possibly reaching 55 cm (22 in). The male is about 5% longer than the female. Adult kea weigh between 750 and 1,000 g (1.65 and 2.20 lb), with males averaging 956 g (2.108 lb) and females averaging 779 g (1.717 lb). The mean adult weight is 922 g (2.033 lb).

It has mostly olive-green plumage: the feathers on the sides of its face are dark olive-brown, the back and rump feathers are orange-red, and some of the outer wing feathers are dull blue. The kea has orange feathers on the undersides of its wings, and a short, broad, bluish-green tail with a black tip. Feather shafts project at the tip of the tail and the undersides of the inner tail feathers have yellow-orange transverse stripes.

The adult has dark-brown irises, and the cere, eye-rings, and legs are grey. The kea has a grey beak with a long, narrow, curved upper beak.The male's upper beak is 12–14% longer than that of the female.

Juveniles generally resemble adults, but have yellow eye-rings and cere, an orange-yellow lower beak, and grey-yellow legs.

== Distribution and habitat ==
The kea is one of nine living endemic parrot species in New Zealand.

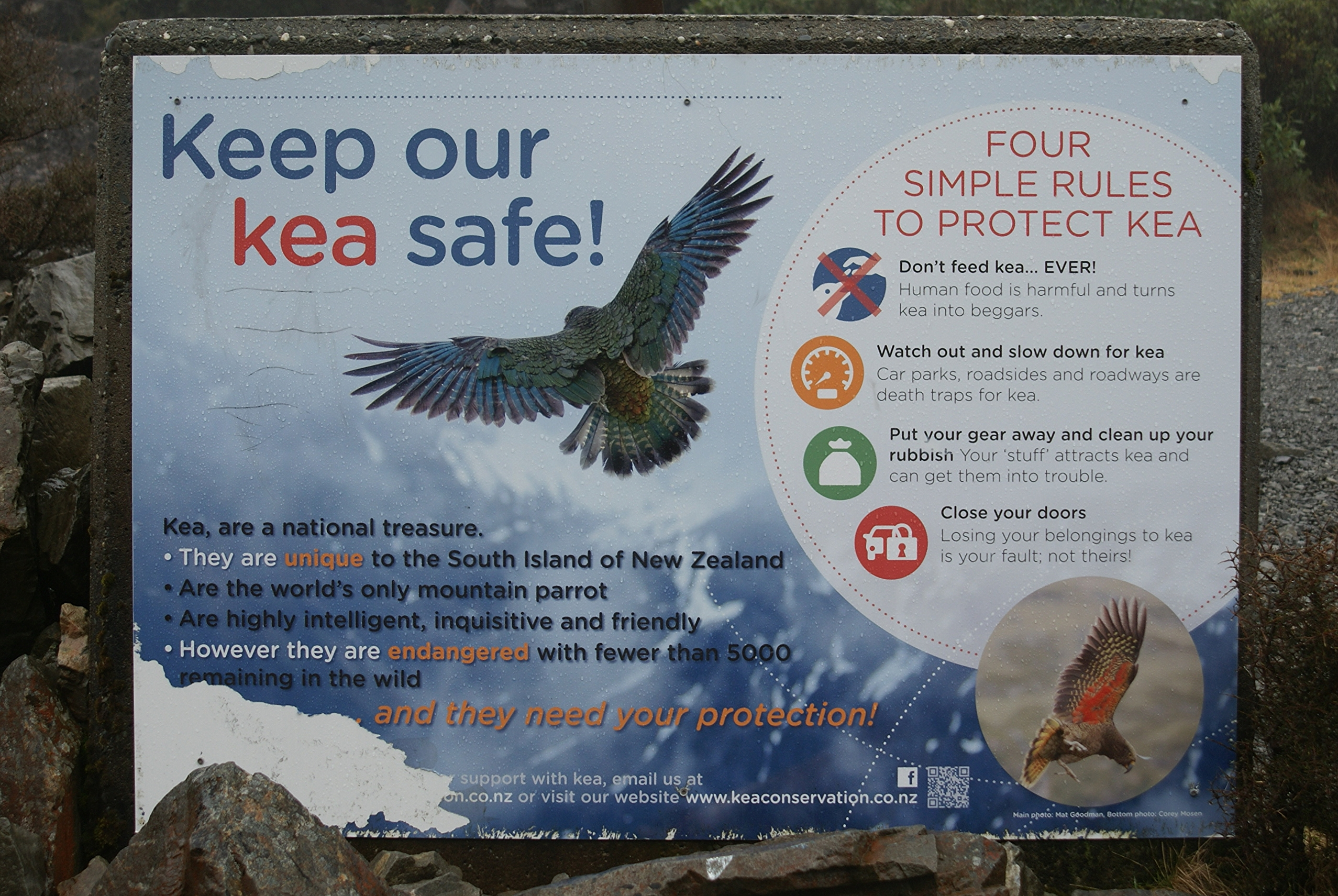
Kea sign at Arthur's Pass

The kea's range is from lowland river valleys and coastal forests of the South Island's west coast up to alpine regions of the South Island such as Arthur's Pass and Aoraki / Mount Cook National Park. It is closely associated throughout its range with the southern beech (Nothofagus) forests on alpine ridges.

Apart from occasional vagrants, kea today are not found in the North Island. Subfossil kea bones have been found in sand dunes at Mataikona in the eastern Wairarapa, Poukawa near Hastings, and Waitomo, indicating that they ranged through lowland forest over much of the North Island until the arrival of Polynesian settlers about 750 years ago. Kea subfossils are not restricted to alpine areas, being commonly found in lowland or coastal sites in the South Island. The current distribution of kea reflects the effects of mammalian predators, including humans, which have driven them out of lowland forests into the mountains.

== Behaviour ==
=== Breeding ===
At least one observer has reported that the kea is polygynous, with one male attached to multiple females. The same source also noted that there was a surplus of females.

Kea are social and live in groups of up to 13 birds. Isolated individuals do badly in captivity, but respond well to seeing themselves in a mirror.

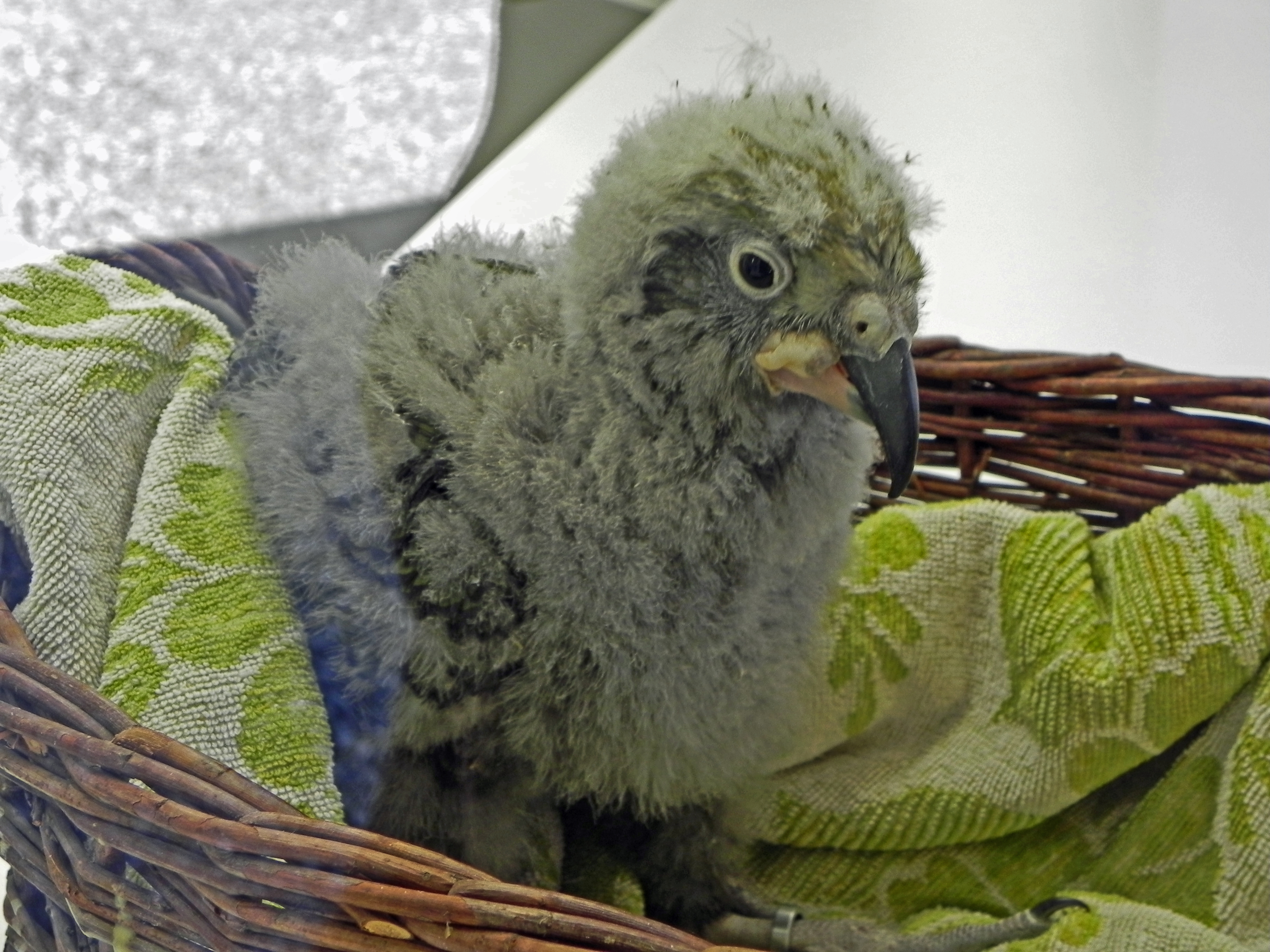
Kea chick, Weltvogelpark Walsrode, Germany

In one study, nest sites occurred at a density of one per 4.4 square kilometres (1.7 sq mi). The breeding areas are most commonly in southern beech (Nothofagus) forests, located on steep mountainsides. Breeding at heights of 1,600 metres (5,200 ft) above sea level and higher, it is one of the few parrot species in the world to regularly spend time above the tree line. Nest sites are usually positioned on the ground underneath large beech trees, in rock crevices, or burrows dug between roots. They are accessed by tunnels leading back 1 to 6 metres (3.3 to 19.7 ft) into a larger chamber, which is furnished with lichens, moss, ferns, and rotting wood. The laying period starts in July and reaches into January. Two to five white eggs are laid, with an incubation time of around 21 days, and a brooding period of 94 days.

Mortality is high among young kea, with less than 40% surviving their first year. The median lifespan of a wild subadult kea has been estimated at five years, based on the proportion of kea seen again in successive seasons in Arthur's Pass, and allowing for some emigration to surrounding areas. Around 10% of the local kea population was expected to be over 20 years of age. The oldest known captive kea was 50 years old in 2008.

=== Cognitive abilities ===
Kea parrots have strong cognitive abilities. According to recent studies, kea have a sense of impulse control and forward planning. Kea can wait up to 160 seconds for a more preferred reward. In addition, kea also use trial-and-error tactics and use observational learning to solve difficult problems and when faced with puzzles and locks. These decision-making abilities are similar to primates and other intelligent bird species such as the African grey parrot.

=== Diet and feeding ===
An omnivore, the kea feeds on more than 40 plant species, beetle larvae, grasshoppers, land snails, other birds (including shearwater chicks), and mammals (including sheep, rabbits and mice). It has been observed breaking open shearwater nests to feed on the chicks after hearing the chicks in their nests. It enjoys the flesh and bone marrow from carcasses. The kea has also taken advantage of human rubbish and "gifts" of food.

Tool use behaviour has been observed in this species. A bird named Bruce, who has a broken upper beak, wedged pebbles between his tongue and lower mandible and then utilised this arrangement to aid with his preening habits.

==== Sheep ====
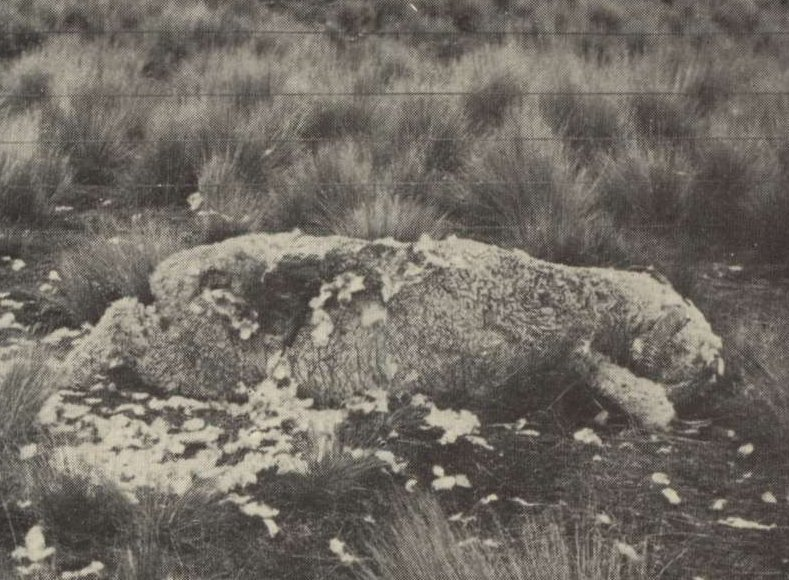
Sheep, suspected to have been killed by kea in July 1907

The controversy about whether the kea preys on sheep is long-running. Sheep suffering from unusual wounds on their sides or loins were noticed by the mid-1860s, within a decade of sheep farmers moving into the high country. Although some supposed the cause was a new disease, suspicion soon fell on the kea. James MacDonald, head shepherd at Wanaka Station, witnessed a kea attacking a sheep in 1868, and similar accounts were widespread. Prominent members of the scientific community accepted that kea attacked sheep, with Alfred Wallace citing this as an example of behavioural change in his 1889 book Darwinism. Thomas Potts noted that attacks were most frequent during winter and snow-bound sheep with two years growth in their fleece were the most vulnerable, while newly-shorn sheep in warm weather were rarely molested.

Despite substantial anecdotal evidence of sheep attacks, others remained unconvinced, especially in later years. For instance, in 1962, animal specialist J.R. Jackson concluded that while the bird may attack sick or injured sheep, especially if it mistakes them for dead, it is not a significant predator. In August 1992, however, its nocturnal assaults were captured on video, proving that at least some kea will attack and feed on healthy sheep. The video confirmed what many scientists had long suspected: that the kea uses its powerful, curved beak and claws to rip through the layer of wool and eat the fat from the back of the animal. Though the bird does not directly kill the sheep, death can result from infections or accidents suffered by animals when trying to escape.

Since kea are now a protected species, their depredations are generally tolerated by sheep farmers, though why some kea attack sheep, and others do not, remains unclear. Various theories, including similarities with existing food sources, curiosity, entertainment, hunger, maggots as well as a progression from scavenging dead sheep and hides have all been put forward as to how the behaviour was first acquired. Anecdotal evidence also suggests that only particular birds have learned the behaviour, with identification and removal of those individuals being sufficient to control the problem.

There are also anecdotal reports of kea attacking rabbits, dogs, and even horses. There are also suggestions that kea used to feed on moa in a similar way.

== Relationship with humans ==
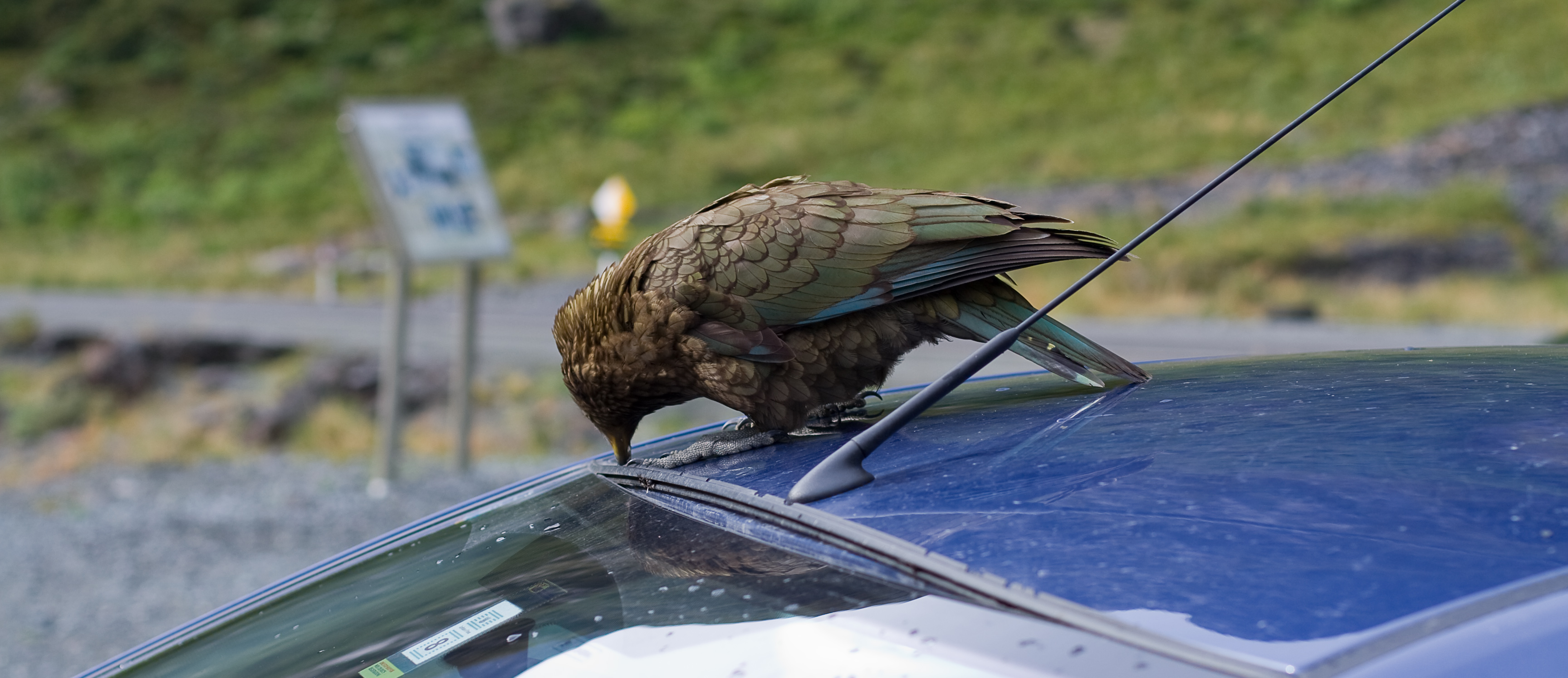
Kea damaging a parked car

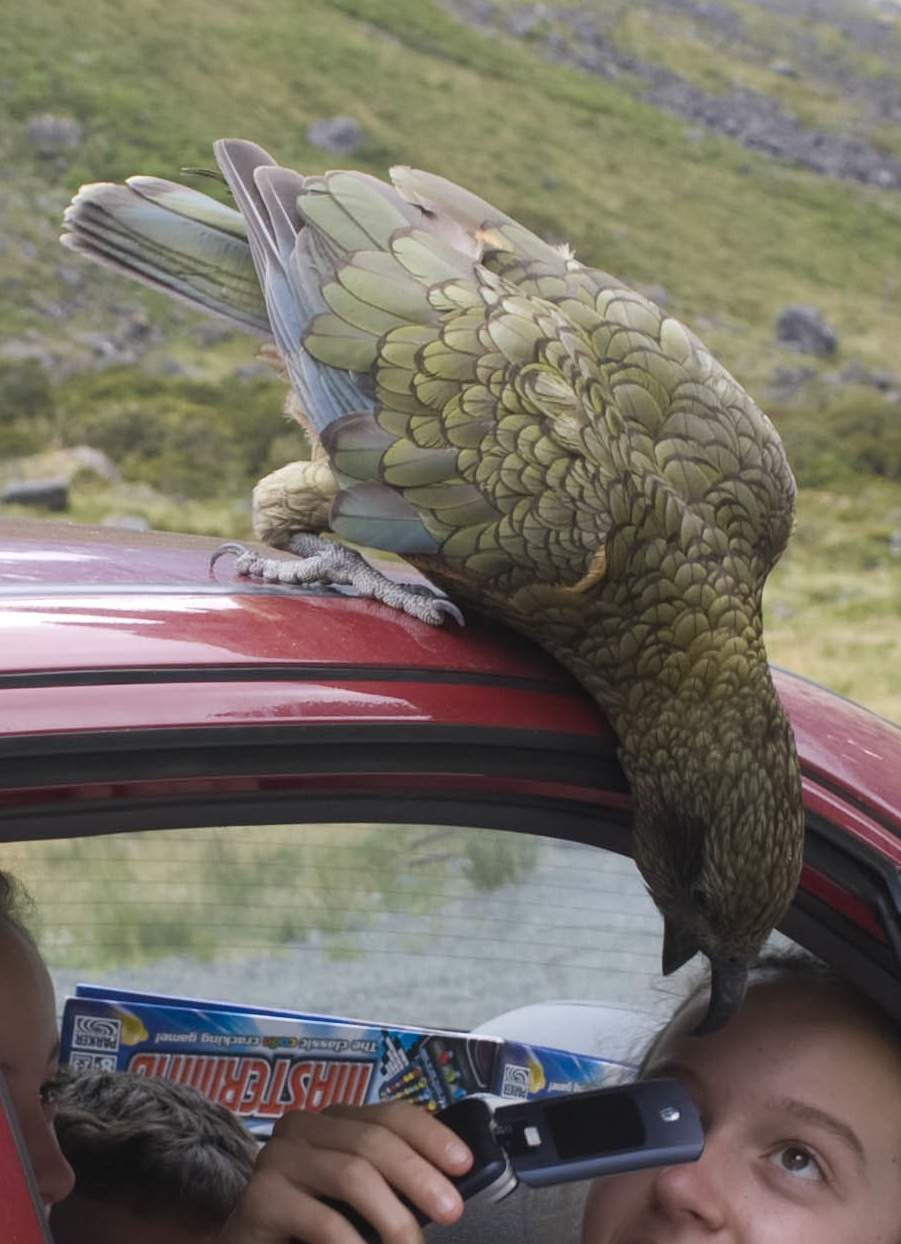
Kea investigating tourists

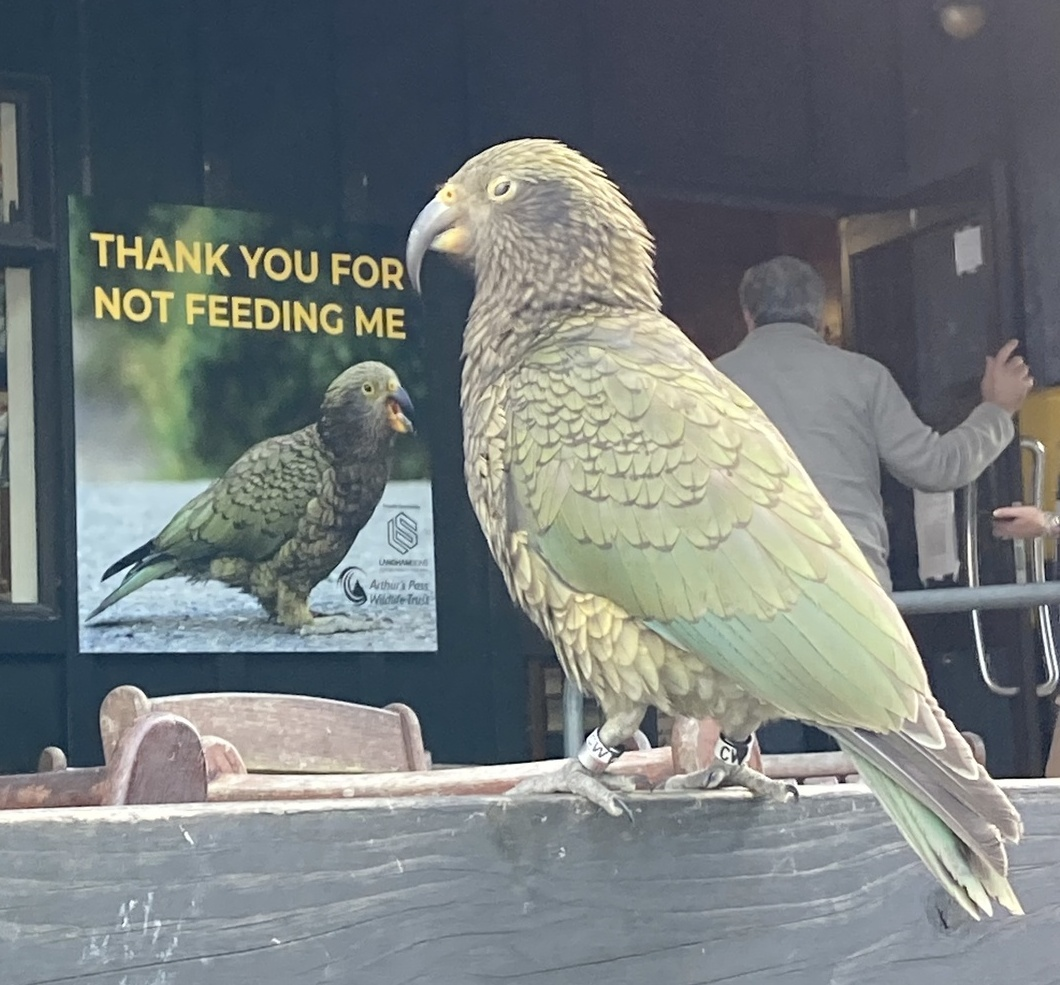
At Arthur's Pass, Canterbury

Kea, which are social, have a high level of cognitive ability and the capacity to solve complex tasks. This curiosity and urge to explore and investigate make the bird both a pest for residents and an attraction for tourists. In 2017 the kea was voted New Zealand Bird of the Year in a campaign to raise awareness about the country's endangered wildlife.

Called "the clown of the mountains", it will investigate backpacks, boots, skis, snowboards, and even cars, often causing damage or flying off with smaller items. Kea have been kept as pets before they were protected, but rarely, since they were difficult to capture and destructive when in captivity.

People commonly encounter wild kea at South Island ski areas, where they are attracted by the prospect of food scraps. Their curiosity leads them to peck and carry away unguarded items of clothing, or to pry apart rubber parts of cars, to the entertainment and annoyance of human observers. They are often described as "cheeky". A kea has even been reported to have made off with the passport of a tourist who was visiting Fiordland National Park.

The Department of Conservation suggested that the time savings resulting from a human-assisted, more calorie-rich diet gives kea more free time to investigate and damage things at campsites and car parks.

The bird's naturally trusting behaviour around humans has also been indicated as a contributing factor in a number of incidents at popular tourist spots where kea have been purposely killed.

Kea were eaten by Māori. They were believed by the Waitaha tribe to be kaitiaki (guardians).

=== Cultural references ===
The kea featured on the reverse side of the New Zealand $10 note between 1967 and 1992, when it was replaced by the blue duck (whio).

Kea are the protagonists in New Zealand author Philip Temple's novels Beak of the Moon (1981) and Dark of the Moon (1993), recounting respectively the first encounters of a group of kea with humans at the time of the colonisation of the South Island by Māori, and their life in present-day, human-dominated New Zealand. Sentient kea also feature as prominent characters in the Orson Scott Card novel The Last Shadow.

The youngest section of Scouts New Zealand (known as Beavers in the United Kingdom and Joeys in Australia) is named after the bird.

=== Threats ===
Together with local councils and run holders, the New Zealand government formerly paid a bounty for kea bills because the bird preyed upon livestock, mainly sheep. It was intended that hunters would kill kea only on the farms and council areas that paid the bounty, but some hunted them in national parks and in Westland, where they were officially protected. More than 150,000 were killed in the hundred years before 1970, when the bounty was lifted.

A study of kea numbers in Nelson Lakes National Park showed a substantial decline in the population between 1999 and 2009, caused primarily by predation of kea eggs and chicks. Video cameras set up to monitor kea nests in South Westland showed that possums killed kea fledglings.

Lead poisoning, mostly from the roofs of buildings/building materials, is also a significant cause of premature deaths among kea. Research on lead toxicity in kea living at Aoraki / Mount Cook found that of 38 live kea tested, all were found to have detectable blood lead levels, with 26 considered dangerously high. Additional analysis of 15 dead kea sent to Massey University for diagnostic pathology between 1991 and 1997 found that nine bodies had lead blood levels consistent with causing death. Research conducted by Victoria University in 2008 confirmed that the natural curiosity of kea, which has enabled the species to adapt to its extreme environment, may increase its propensity to poisoning through ingestion of lead – i.e. the more investigative behaviours identified in a bird, the higher its blood lead levels were likely to be.

The pesticide 1080 is used to control invasive pest mammals such as stoats and possums and has also been implicated in kea deaths. For example, seven kea were found dead following an aerial possum control operation using 1080 at Fox Glacier in July 2008, and a further seven were found dead in August 2011, following a 1080 aerial possum control operation in Ōkārito Forest. Traps are also considered a risk to kea. In September 2011, hidden cameras caught kea breaking into baited stoat traps in the Matukituki Valley. More than 75% of the traps had been sprung.

=== Conservation ===
In the 1970s, the kea received partial protection after a census counted only 5,000 birds. The government agreed to investigate any reports of problem birds and have them removed from the land. In 1986 the kea was given absolute protection under the Wildlife Act 1953. Kea are also listed under Appendix II of the Convention on International Trade in Endangered Species of Wild Fauna and Flora (CITES) meaning international export/import (including parts and derivatives) is regulated.

Despite being classified as Nationally Endangered in the New Zealand Threat Classification System and endangered in the IUCN Red List and protected by law, kea are still deliberately shot. For example, in the late 1990s, a Fox Glacier resident killed 33 kea in the glacier car park and in 2008, two kea were shot in Arthur's Pass and stapled to a sign.

Kea deaths due to traffic have prompted the NZ Transport Agency to install signs to help raise awareness, and to encourage people to slow down if necessary. In Fiordland National Park, there have been concerns that kea are particularly at risk from road traffic at the entrance to the Homer Tunnel. Kea have been regularly observed on the roadway, moving amongst vehicles waiting to pass through the one-way tunnel. People feeding the birds was one cause of the problem. In 2017, a gym for kea was built near the Homer tunnel entrance in an attempt to lure the birds away from the road.

A citizen science project called the "Kea Database" was launched in 2017 that allows for the recording of kea observations to an online database. If the recorded kea are banded, it is possible to match observations with individual named birds, enabling the monitoring of the habits and behaviour of individual kea.

Some are calling for kea to be reintroduced into predator-free zones on the North Island. A former curator of natural history at Whanganui Regional Museum, Dr Mike Dickison, told North & South magazine in the October 2018 issue that the birds would do well on Mount Ruapehu.

Kea conservation is supported by the NGO Kea Conservation Trust, founded in 2006 to protect kea.

The total kea population was estimated at between 1,000 and 5,000 individuals in 1986, contrasting with another estimate of 15,000 birds in 1992. The kea's widespread distribution at low density across inaccessible areas prevents accurate estimates. Estimates published in 2017 suggest a population of between 3,000 and 7,000 individuals.
