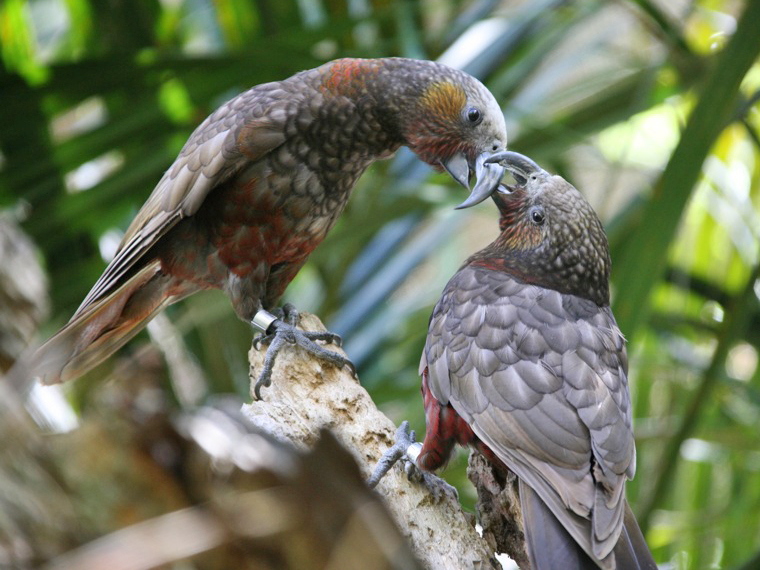
- Kākā, North Island subspecies (Nestor meridionalis septentrionalis) at Auckland Zoo, New Zealand

Scientific classification
- Kingdom: Animalia
- Phylum: Chordata
- Class: Aves
- Order: Psittaciformes
- Superfamily: Strigopoidea; Bonaparte, 1849
- Family: Strigopidae; Bonaparte, 1849

Genera
- †Heracles; †Nelepsittacus; Nestor; Strigops

Synonyms
- Nestoridae Bonaparte, 1849

= New Zealand parrot =

New Zealand parrots Temporal range: Early Miocene to present

Family of birds

The New Zealand parrot family, Strigopidae, consists of at least three genera of parrots – Nestor, Strigops, the fossil Nelepsittacus, and probably the fossil Heracles. The genus Nestor consists of the kea, kākā, Norfolk kākā and Chatham kākā, while the genus Strigops contains the kākāpō. All extant species are endemic to New Zealand. The species of the genus Nelepsittacus were endemics of the main islands, while the two extinct species of the genus Nestor were found at the nearby oceanic islands such as Chatham Island of New Zealand, and Norfolk Island and adjacent Phillip Island.

The Norfolk kākā and the Chatham kākā have become extinct in recent times, while the species of the genus Nelepsittacus have been extinct for 16 million years. All extant species, the kākāpō, kea, and the two subspecies of the kākā, are threatened. Human activity caused the two extinctions and the decline of the other three species. Settlers introduced invasive species, such as pigs, cats, foxes, weasels, rats and possums, which eat the eggs of ground-nesting birds, and additional declines have been caused by hunting for food, killing as agricultural pests, habitat loss, and introduced wasps.

The family diverged from the other parrots around 82 million years ago when New Zealand broke off from Gondwana, while the ancestors of the genera Nestor and Strigops diverged from each other between 60 and 80 million years ago.

== Systematics ==
No consensus existed regarding the taxonomy of Psittaciformes until recently. The placement of the Strigopoidea species has been variable in the past. The family belongs to its own superfamily Strigopoidea. This superfamily is one of three superfamilies in the order Psittaciformes; the other two families are Cacatuoidea (cockatoos) and Psittacoidea (true parrots). While some taxonomists include three genera (Nestor, Nelepsittacus, and Strigops) in the family Strigopidae, others place Nestor and Nelepsittacus in the Nestoridae and retain only Strigops in the Strigopidae. Traditionally, the species of the family Strigopoidea were placed in the superfamily Psittacoidea, but several studies confirmed the unique placement of this group at the base of the parrot tree.

== Phylogeography ==
An unproven hypothesis for the phylogeography of this group has been proposed, providing an example of various speciation mechanisms at work. In this scenario, ancestors of this group became isolated from the remaining parrots when New Zealand broke away from Gondwana about 82 million years ago, resulting in a physical separation of the two groups. This mechanism is called allopatric speciation. Over time, ancestors of the two surviving genera, Nestor and Strigops, adapted to different ecological niches. This led to reproductive isolation, an example of ecological speciation. In the Pliocene, supposedly around five million years ago, the formation of the Southern Alps / Kā Tiritiri o te Moana diversified the landscape and provided new opportunities for speciation within the genus Nestor. Around three million years ago, two lineages may have adapted to high altitude and low altitude, respectively. The high-altitude lineage gave rise to the modern kea, while the low-altitude lineage gave rise to the various kākā species. Island species diverge rapidly from mainland species once a few vagrants arrive at a suitable island. Both the Norfolk kākā and the Chatham kākā are the result of migration of a limited number of individuals to islands and subsequent adaptation to the habitat of those islands. The lack of DNA material for the Chatham kākā makes it difficult to establish precisely when those speciation events occurred. Finally, in recent times, the kākā populations at the North Island and South Island became isolated from each other due to the rise in sea levels when the continental glaciers melted at the end of the Pleistocene.

Until modern times, New Zealand and the surrounding islands were not inhabited by four-legged mammals, an environment that enabled some birds to make nests on the ground and others to be flightless without fear of predation.

The parakeet species belonging to the genus Cyanoramphus (kākāriki) belong to the true parrot family Psittacidae and are closely related to the endemic genus Eunymphicus from New Caledonia. They may have reached New Zealand between 450,000 and 625,000 years ago from mainland Australia by way of New Caledonia, but this is disputed.

== Species ==
Very little is known about the Chatham kākā. The genus Nelepsittacus consists of three described and one undescribed species recovered from early Miocene deposits in Otago. The genus Heracles consists of a giant species also described from the early Miocene of Otago.

Common name (binomial name) Status	Image	Description	Range and habitat
Nestor
Kea (Nestor notabilis); Endangered		48 cm (19 in) long. Mostly olive-green with scarlet underwings and rump. Dark-edged feathers. Dark brown beak, iris, legs, and feet. Male has longer bill.	New Zealand: South Island High-level forests and subalpine scrublands 850–1400 m AMSL.
South Island kākā (Nestor meridionalis meridionalis); Vulnerable		Similar to the North Island kākā, but slightly smaller, brighter colours, the crown is almost white, and the bill is longer and more arched in males.	New Zealand: South Island Unbroken tracts of Nothofagus and Podocarpus forests 450–850 m AMSL in summer and 0–550 m in winter.
North Island kākā (Nestor meridionalis septentrionalis); Vulnerable		About 45 cm (18 in) long. Mainly olive-brown with dark feather edges. Crimson underwings, rump, and collar. The cheeks are golden/brown. The crown is greyish.	New Zealand: North Island Unbroken tracts of Nothofagus and Podocarpus forests between 450 and 850 m AMSL in summer and 0–550 m in winter.
Norfolk kākā (Nestor productus); Extinct by 1851 approx.		About 38 cm long. Mostly olive-brown upperparts, (reddish-)orange cheeks and throat, straw-coloured breast, thighs, rump and lower abdomen dark orange.	Formerly endemic on Norfolk Island and adjacent Phillip Island Rocks and trees
Chatham kākā (Nestor chathamensis); Extinct by 1500–1650		Only known from subfossil bones.	Formerly endemic on Chatham Island of New Zealand Forests
Strigops
Kākāpō (Strigops habroptila); Critically endangered		Large rotund parrots 58–64 cm (23–25 in) long; males are larger than females and weigh 2–4 kg (4.4–8.8 lb) at maturity. Mostly green with brown and yellow mottled barring, the underparts are greenish-yellow. Its face is pale and owl-like.	New Zealand: Maud, Chalky, Codfish / Whenua Hou and Anchor Islands Climax Nothofagus (beech) and Podocarpus (conifer) forests, regenerating subalpine scrub, snow tussock Danthonia grassland 10–1400 m AMSL.

== Common names ==
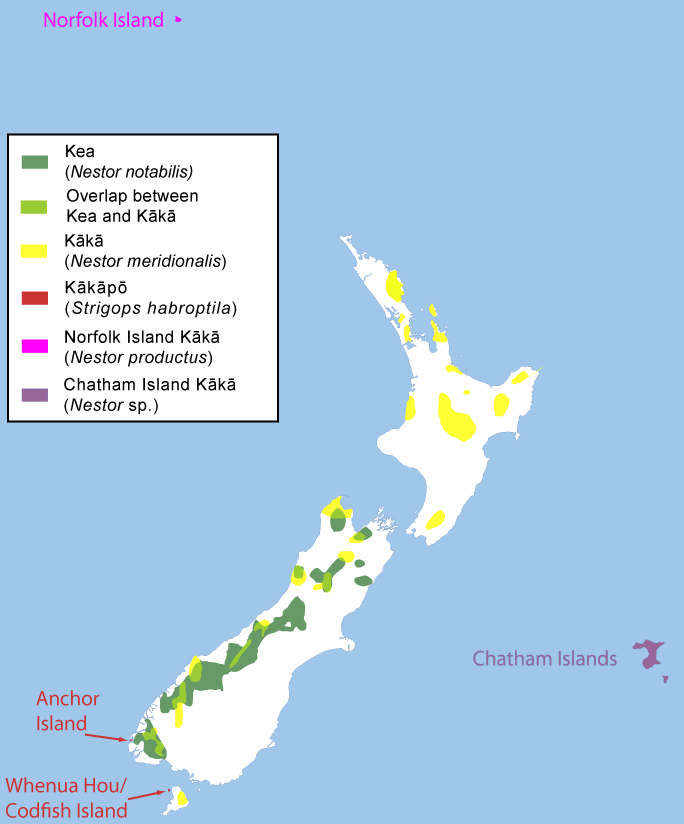
Current distribution of extant species, as well as previous distribution of extinct island species.

All common names for species in this family are the same as the traditional Māori names. The Māori word kākā derives from the ancient Proto-Polynesian word meaning parrot. Kākāpō is a logical extension of that name, as pō means night, resulting in kākā of the night or night parrot, reflecting the species' nocturnal behaviour. (In modern orthography of the Māori language, the long versions of the vowels a and o are written with macrons; i.e., ā and ō. Note that a long ā in Maori should be pronounced like the a in English "father". The etymology of kea in Māori is less clear; it might be onomatopoeic of its kee-aah call.

== Ecology ==
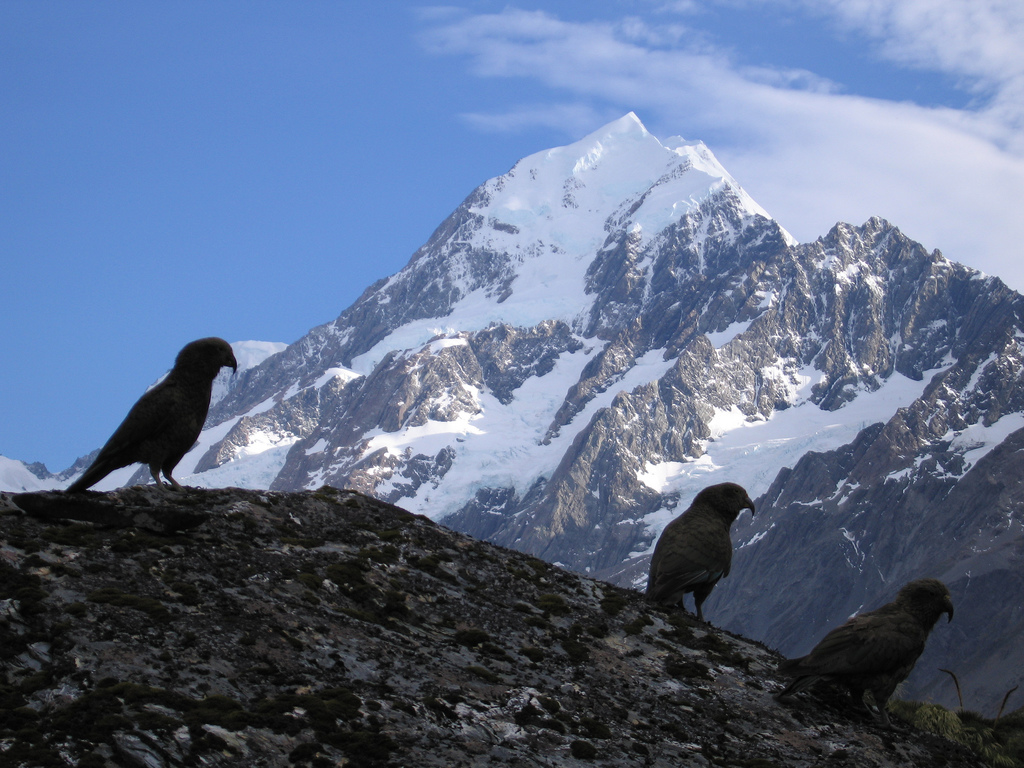
Kea are well adapted to life in the alpine zone, like these in the Southern Alps. The highest mountain in New Zealand, Aoraki / Mount Cook, is in the background.

The isolated location of New Zealand has made it difficult for mammals to reach the island. This is reflected in the absence of land mammals other than bats. The main predators were birds: harriers, falcons, owls, and the massive, extinct Haast's eagle. Many of the adaptations found in the avifauna reflect the unique context in which they evolved. This unique balance was disrupted with the arrival of the Polynesians, who introduced the Polynesian rat and the kurī (Polynesian dog) to the island. Later, Europeans introduced many more species, including large herbivores and mammalian predators.

The three extant species of this family occupy rather different ecological niches, a result of the phylogeographical dynamics of this family. The kākāpō is a flightless, nocturnal species, well camouflaged to avoid the large diurnal birds of prey on the island, while the local owls are too small to prey on the kākāpō at night. The kākāpō is the only flightless bird in the world to use a lek-breeding system. Usually, they breed only every 3–5 years when certain podocarp trees like rimu (Dacrydium cupressinum) mast abundantly.

The kea is well adapted to life at high altitudes, and they are regularly observed in the snow at ski resorts. As trees are absent in the alpine zone, they breed in hollows in the ground instead of in tree hollows like most parrot species.

== Relationship with humans ==
=== Importance to the Māori ===
The parrots were important to the Māori in various ways. They hunted them for food, kept them as pets, and used their feathers in weaving such items as their kahu huruhuru (feather cloak). Feathers were also used to decorate the head of the taiaha, a Māori weapon, but were removed prior to battle. The skins of the kākāpō with the feathers attached were used to make cloaks (kākahu) and dress capes (kahu kākāpō), especially for the wives and daughters of chiefs. Māori like to refer to the kākā in the tauparapara, the incantation to begin their mihi (tribute), because their voice (reo) is continuous.

=== Status ===
Of the five species, the Norfolk kākā and Chatham kākā became extinct in recent history. The last known Norfolk kākā died in captivity in London sometime after 1851, and only between seven and 20 skins survive. The Chatham kākā became extinct between 1500 and 1650 in pre-European times, after Polynesians arrived at the island, and is only known from subfossil bones. Of the surviving species, the kākāpō is critically endangered, with living individuals numbering only 325 (as of 2026). The mainland kākā is listed as endangered, alongside the kea.

=== Threats ===
The fauna of New Zealand evolved in the total absence of humans and other mammals. Only a few bat species and sea mammals were present prior to colonisation by humans, and the only predators were birds of prey that hunt by sight. These circumstances influence the design of New Zealand's parrots, for example, the flightlessness of the kākāpō and the ground breeding of the kea. Polynesians arrived at Aotearoa between 800 and 1300 AD, and introduced the kurī (dog) and kiore (Polynesian rat) to the islands. This was disastrous for the native fauna, because mammalian predators can locate prey by scent, and the native fauna had no defence against them.

The kākāpō was hunted for its meat, skin, and plumage. When the first European settlers arrived, the kākāpō was already declining, but still widespread. The large-scale clearance of forests and bush destroyed its habitat while introduced predators such as rats, cats, and stoats found the flightless, ground-nesting birds easy prey.

The New Zealand kākā needs large tracts of forest to thrive, and the continued fragmentation of forests due to agriculture and logging has a devastating effect on this species. Another threat comes from competition with introduced species for food, for example with possums for the endemic mistletoe and rata and with wasps for shimmering honeydew, an excretion of scale insects. Females, young, and eggs are particularly vulnerable in the tree hollows in which they nest.

The kea nests in holes in the ground, again making it vulnerable to introduced predators. Another major threat, resulting from development of the alpine zone, is their opportunistic reliance on human food sources as their natural food sources dwindle.

=== Conservation ===
Recovery programs for the kākāpō and the kākā have been established, while the kea is also closely monitored. The 325 (as of 2026) living kākāpō are all in a breeding and conservation program. Each one has been individually named.

== See also ==
- Kākāriki, New Zealand parakeets
- Fauna of New Zealand
