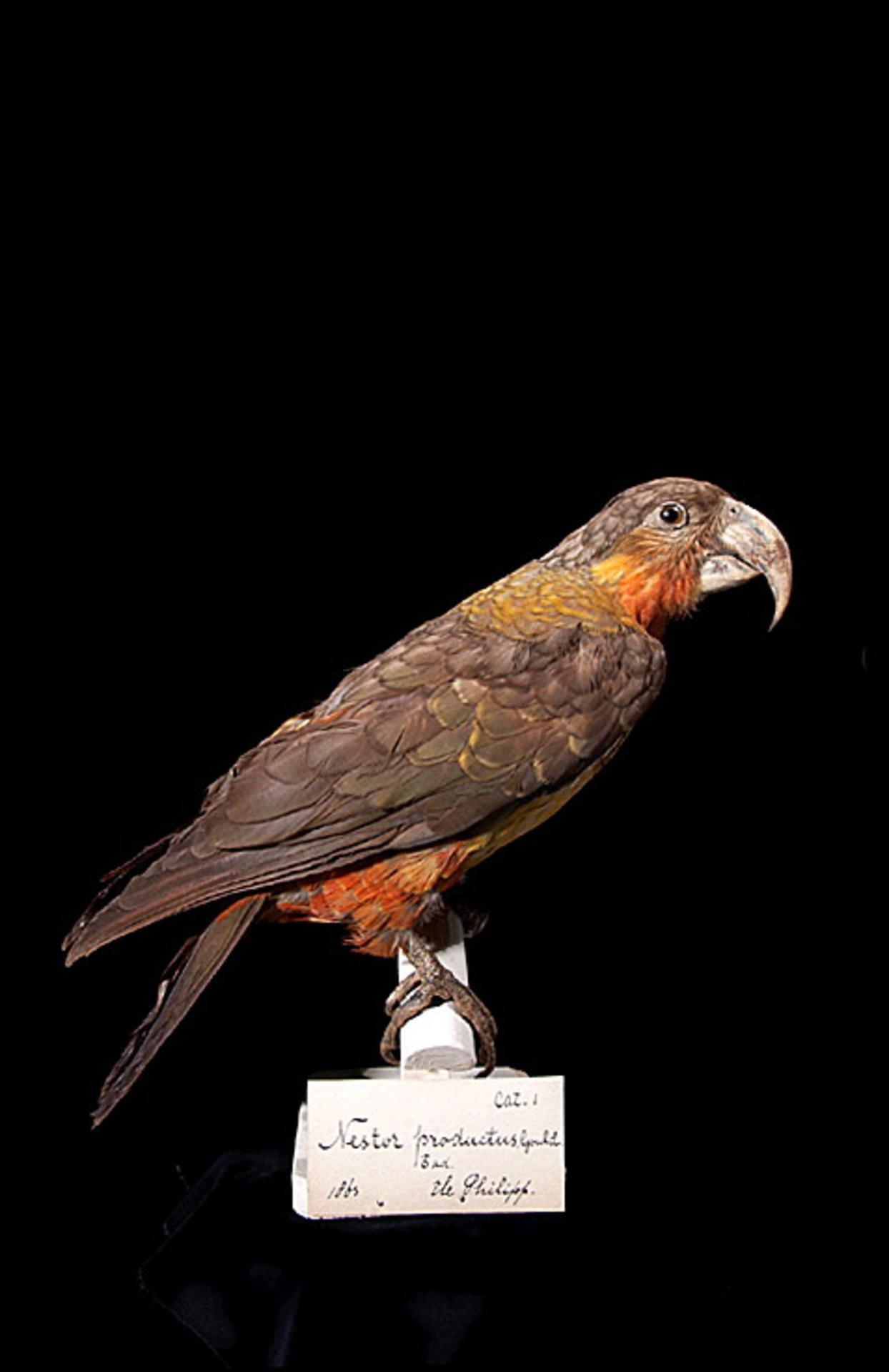
- Naturalis Biodiversity Center's taxidermed Norfolk kākā

Conservation status
- Extinct (1851) (IUCN 3.1)

Scientific classification
- Kingdom: Animalia
- Phylum: Chordata
- Class: Aves
- Order: Psittaciformes
- Family: Strigopidae
- Genus: Nestor
- Species: †N. productus

Binomial name
- †Nestor productus (Gould, 1836)

Synonyms
- Nestor norfolcensis Plyctolophus productus Centrurus productus

= Norfolk kākā =

Extinct species of bird

The Norfolk kākā (Nestor productus) is an extinct species of large parrot, belonging to the parrot family Nestoridae. The birds were about 38 cm long, with mostly olive-brown upperparts, reddish-orange cheeks and throat, straw-coloured breast, thighs, rump and lower abdomen dark orange and a prominent beak. It inhabited the rocks and treetops of Norfolk Island and adjacent Phillip Island. It was a relative of the New Zealand kākā.

== Taxonomy ==
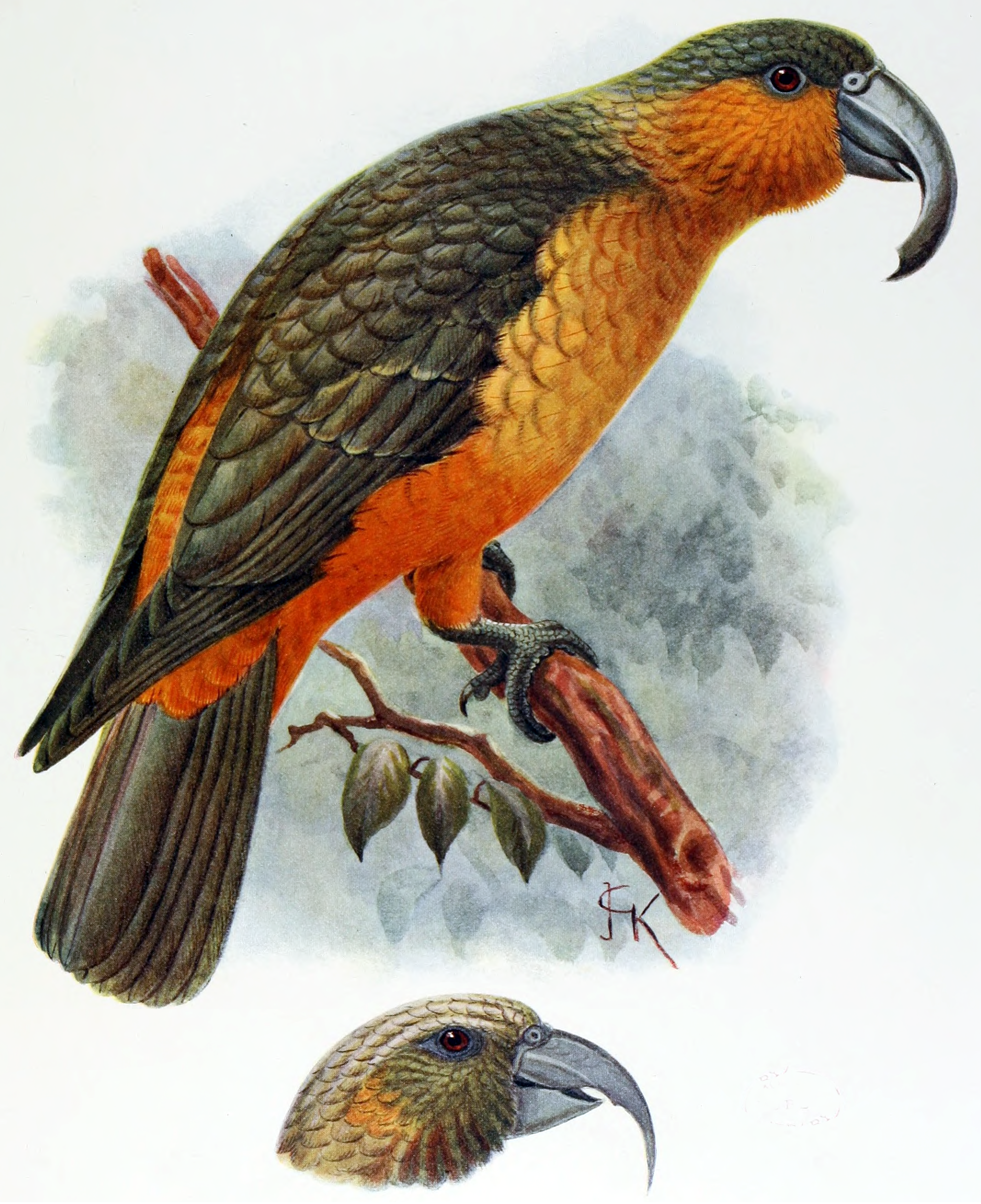
John Keulemans illustration of a bird from Norfolk Island, and the head of a Phillip Island specimen

The Norfolk kākā was first described by the naturalist Johann Reinhold Forster and his son Georg following the discovery of Norfolk Island by James Cook on 10 October 1774. The description was only published in 1844. Around 1790, John Hunter depicted a bird on a kangaroo apple (Solanum aviculare). The bird was formally described by John Gould in 1836, from a specimen at the Zoological Society of London. Originally, the individuals from Norfolk Island and Philip Island were considered two separate species, Nestor norfolcensis (described by August von Pelzeln in 1860) and Nestor productus, respectively, but direct comparison of specimens of both islands showed that they were the same species.

The Norfolk kākā was first described by John Gould in 1836 as Plyctolophus productus.

== Behaviour and ecology ==
Little is known of the bird's biology. It was said to have lived both on the ground and in tall trees, feeding on flowering shrubs and trees. The call was described by Gould as "hoarse, quacking, inharmonious noise, sometimes resembling the barking of a dog".

== Extinction ==
The Polynesians who lived on the Island for some time before the arrival of the Europeans, hunted the kākā for food before disappearing from the island around the 1600s. It was also hunted for food and trapped as a pet after the arrival of the first settlers in 1788. The species' population suffered heavily after a penal colony was maintained from 1788 to 1814, and again from 1825 to 1854. The species likely became extinct in the wild in the early nineteenth century some time during the period of this second penal colony. It was not recorded by Ensign Abel D. W. Best on either Norfolk or Phillip Island in his 1838/1839 diary entries. As Best collected specimens for ornithology, including the Norfolk parakeet (which he called "lories", being similar in shape), it is hard to accept that he would not have documented this much more attractive quarry, had the kākā still been present. The last bird in captivity died in London in 1851.

== Skins ==
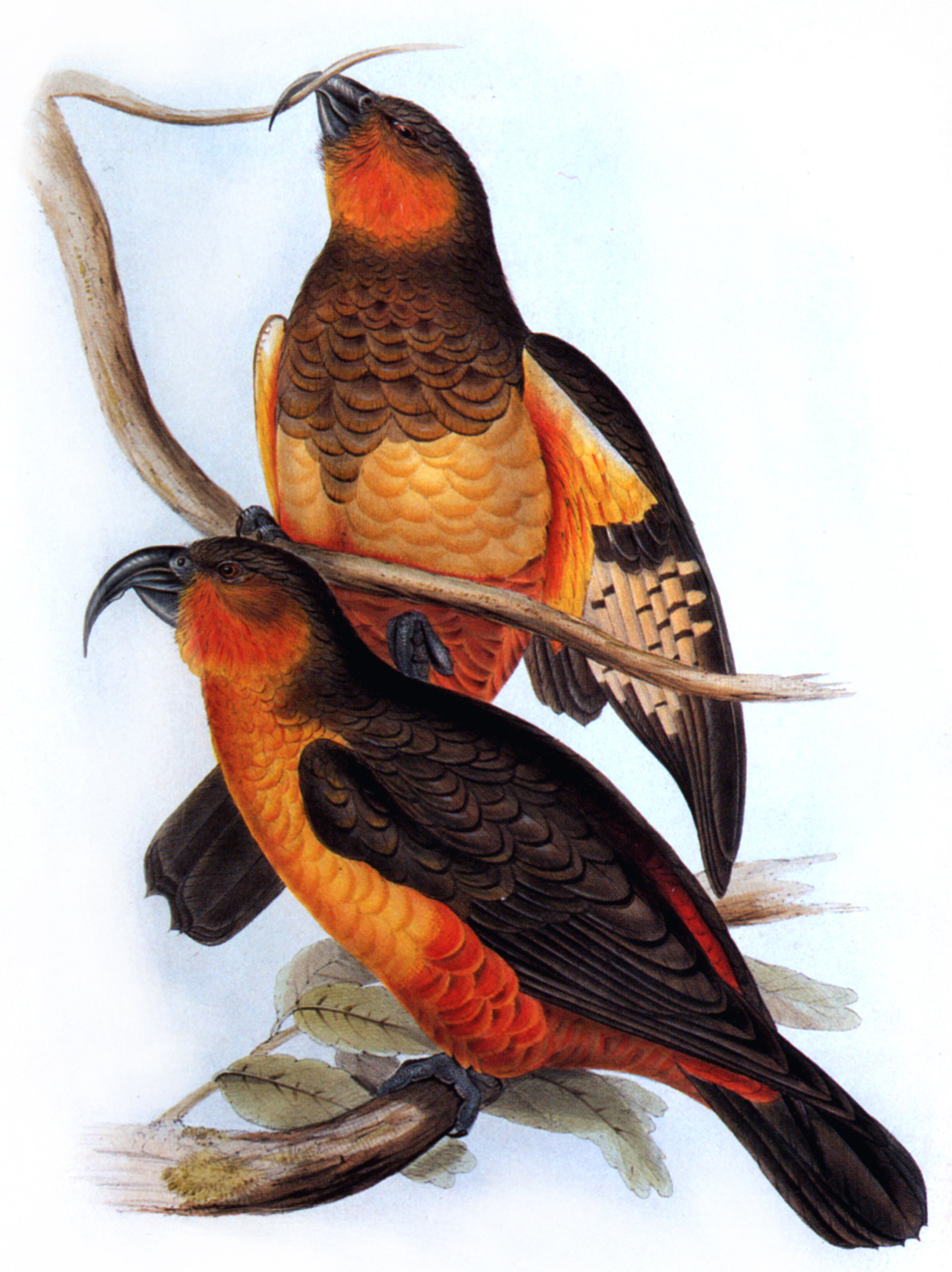
Painting by John Gould

Turnaround video of a male specimen, Naturalis Biodiversity Center

At least 16 specimens survive.

| Museum | Collection numbers | Collection location | References |
|---|---|---|---|
| Australian Museum in Sydney | AM O.22287 & AM PA.2933 | Phillip Island | |
| Museum Victoria in Melbourne | NMV 14050 | Phillip Island | |
| American Museum of Natural History in New York City | AMNH SKIN-616718 & AMNH Skin-300597 | | |
| National Museum of Natural History in Washington, D.C. | USNM 176991.4028148 & USNM 151991.4354158 | unknown and Phillip Island | |
| Academy of Natural Sciences in Philadelphia | ANSP 22082 (TYPE) | Phillip Island | |
| Zoölogisch Museum in Amsterdam -> Naturalis | ZMA 3164 | Phillip Island | |
| Naturalis in Leiden | RMNH 110.061 & RMNH 110.068 | Phillip Island | |
| Natural History Museum in Tring | NHMUK 1837.9.26.12, NHMUK 1955.6.N.19.3, NMHUK VEL.25.282a and NHMUK without catalog number | | |
| Museum of Zoology and Natural History (La Specola) | 1 skin | | |
| Birmingham Museums Trust | 1 taxidermy mount, 1912Z108 | | |
| Derby Museum (now known as World Museum, National Museums Liverpool), Liverpool | NML-VZ D756 and NML-VZ D756a | Norfolk Island & Phillip Island | |
| Dresden: | C.3363 | Phillip Island | |
| Frankfurt a. M. | SMF 17346 | Phillip Island | |
| Halberstadt | skin | - | |
| Göttingen | dermoplastik, male | - | |
| Wien | LECTOTYPE: NMW 41.026 | - | - |

Forshaw has measurements of seven skins, one male, one female and five of unknown sex.

Naturalis in Leiden has 2 skins; one male (RMNH 110.061) and one female (RMNH 110.068). Both individuals originate from Philip Island. The male skin was acquired in 1863 long after the species' assumed disappearance, but it is unknown how it came to Leiden. It is more likely, given Phillip Island was already overrun with feral pigs, rabbits, goats and chicken in late 1838, that the 1863 specimen was purchased from another collection. The single unsexed individual from Philip Island at the Zoölogisch Museum (ZMA 3164) has been obtained before 1860, and originate probably from the same batch as the two specimens at Naturalis in Leiden. An old list of the specimens of birds present in the British Museum of Natural History list two individuals, both from Philip Island. One of the two specimens came from Bell's collection.
