= 2011 in archosaur paleontology =

The year 2011 in archosaur paleontology was eventful. Archosaurs include the only living dinosaur group — birds — and the reptile crocodilians, plus all extinct dinosaurs, extinct crocodilian relatives, and pterosaurs. Archosaur palaeontology is the scientific study of those animals, especially as they existed before the Holocene Epoch began about 11,700 years ago. The year 2011 in paleontology included various significant developments regarding archosaurs.

This article records new taxa of fossil archosaurs of every kind that have been described during the year 2011, as well as other significant discoveries and events related to paleontology of archosaurs that occurred in the year 2011.

== Newly named crurotarsans ==
Name	Novelty	Status	Authors	Age	Unit	Location	Notes	Images
Acherontisuchus	Gen. et sp.	Valid	Hastings; Bloch; Jaramillo	Middle/Late Paleocene	Cerrejón Formation	Colombia	A dyrosaurid.	
Anteophthalmosuchus	Gen. et sp.	Valid	Salisbury; Naish	Early Cretaceous	Wealden Group	United Kingdom	A goniopholidid.	
Arenysuchus	Gen. et sp.	Valid	Puértolas; Canudo; Cruzado-Caballero	Maastrichtian	Tremp Formation	Spain	Originally interpreted as a stem crocodyloid, now considered an allodaposuchid.	
Caipirasuchus	Gen. et sp.	Valid	Iori; Carvalho	Turonian/Santonian	Adamantina Formation	Brazil	A sphagesaurid.	
Campinasuchus	Gen. et sp.	Valid	Carvalho; Teixeira; et al. (Note: Carvalho, Teixeira, Ferraz, Ribeiro, Martinelli, Neto, Sertich, Cunha, Cunha, Ferraz.)	Turonian/Santonian	Adamantina Formation	Brazil	A baurusuchid.	
Caryonosuchus	Gen. et sp.	Valid	Kellner; Campos; et al. (Note: Kellner, Campos, Riff, de Andrade.)	Campanian/Maastrichtian	Adamantina Formation	Brazil	A sphagesaurid.	
Decuriasuchus	Gen. et sp.	Valid	França; Ferigolo; Langer	Ladinian	Santa Maria Formation	Brazil	Skeletons indicate possible group behavior.	
Fruitachampsa	Gen. et sp.	Valid	Clark	Late Jurassic	Morrison Formation	United States	A shartegosuchid.	
Goniopholis kiplingi	Species	Valid	de Andrade; Edmonds; et al. (Note: de Andrade, Edmonds, Benton, Schouten.)	Berriasian	Purbeck Limestone Group	United Kingdom	A goniopholidid.	
Goniopholis willetti	Species	Valid	Salisbury; Naish	Early Cretaceous	Wealden Group	United Kingdom	A goniopholidid. Originally described as a species of Goniopholis; it was subsequently made the type species of a separate genus Hulkepholis.	
Labidiosuchus	Gen. et sp.	Valid	Kellner; Figueiredo; et al. (Note: Kellner, Figueiredo, Azevedo, Campos.)	Maastrichtian	Marília Formation	Brazil	A notosuchian.	
Leiokarinosuchus	Gen. et sp.	Disputed	Salisbury; Naish	Early Cretaceous	Wealden Group	United Kingdom	A neosuchian. Jouve (2017) considered it to be a junior synonym of Anteophthalmosuchus.	
Lorosuchus	Gen. et sp.	Valid	Pol; Powell	Paleocene	Río Loro Formation	Argentina	A sebecid.	
Neptunidraco	Gen. et sp.	Valid	Cau; Fanti	late Bajocian/early Bathonian	Rosso Ammonitico Veronese Formation	Italy	The oldest known metriorhynchid.	
Pepesuchus	Gen. et sp.	Valid	Campos; Oliveira; et al. (Note: Campos, Oliveira, Figueiredo, Riff, Azevedo, Carvalho, Kellner)	Campanian/Maastrichtian	Presidente Prudente Formation	Brazil	An itasuchid.	
Pietraroiasuchus	Gen. et sp.	Valid	Buscalioni; Piras; et al. (Note: Buscalioni, Piras, Vullo, Signore, Barbera)	Early Albian	Pietraroia Plattenkalk	Italy	A hylaeochampsid.	
Pissarrachampsa	Gen. et sp.	Valid	Montefeltro; Larsson; Langer	Campanian/Maastrichtian	Vale do Rio do Peixe Formation	Brazil	A baurusuchid. The type species is Pissarrachampsa sera.	
Theriosuchus grandinaris	Species	Valid	Lauprasert; Laojumpon; et al. (Note: Lauprasert, Laojumpon, Saenphala, Cuny, Thirakhupt, Suteethorn)	Berriasian/Barremian	Khua Formation	Thailand	A fifth species of Theriosuchus.	

== Newly named non-avian dinosaurs ==
Name	Novelty	Status	Authors	Age	Unit	Location	width="33%" Notes	Images
Acristavus	Gen. et sp.	Valid	Gates; Horner; et al. (Note: Gates, Horner, Hanna, Nelson.)	Campanian	Two Medicine Formation; Wahweap Formation	USA	A brachylophosaurin hadrosaurine.	
Aeolosaurus maximus	Sp.	Valid	Santucci; de Arruda-Campos	Campanian-Maastrichtian	Adamantina Formation	Brazil	A titanosaur sauropod. Originally described as the third species of Aeolosaurus, but subsequently transferred to the separate genus Arrudatitan.	
Ahshislepelta	Gen. et sp.	Valid	Burns; Sullivan	Late Campanian	Kirtland Formation	USA	An ankylosaurine ankylosaurid.	
Albinykus	Gen. et sp.	Valid	Nesbitt; Clarke; et al. (Note: Nesbitt, Clarke, Turner, Norell.)	Late Cretaceous		Mongolia	An alvarezsaurid theropod.	
Amtocephale	Gen. et sp.	Valid	Watabe; Tsogtbaatar; Sullivan	Turonian-Santonian	Baynshire Formation	Mongolia	A pachycephalosaurid.	
Angolatitan	Gen. et sp.	Valid	Mateus; Jacobs; et al. (Note: Mateus, Jacobs, Schulp, Polcyn, Tavares, Neto, Morais, Antunes.)	Late Turonian	Itombe Formation	Angola	A somphospondylian sauropod.	
Arcusaurus	Gen. et sp.	Valid	Yates; Bonnan; Neveling	Lower Jurassic	Elliot Formation	South Africa	Basal Sauropodomorph	
Atacamatitan	Gen. et sp.	Valid	Kellner; Rubilar-Rogers; et al. (Note: Kellner, Rubilar-Rogers, Vargas, Suárez)	Late Cretaceous	Tolar Formation	Chile	A titanosaur.	
Brontomerus	Gen. et sp.	Valid	Taylor; Wedel; Cifelli	Aptian/Albian	Cedar Mountain Formation	USA	A camarasauromorph sauropod.	
Daemonosaurus	Gen. et sp.	Valid	Sues; Nesbitt; et al. (Note: Sues, Nesbitt, Berman, Henrici)	Late Triassic	Chinle Formation	USA	A primitive theropod.	
Delapparentia	Gen. et sp.	Valid	Ruiz-Omeñaca	Early Barremian	Camarillas Formation	Spain	An iguanodontoid.	
Demandasaurus	Gen. et sp.	Valid	Fernández-Baldor; Canudo; et al. (Note: Fernández-Baldor, Canudo, Huerta, Montero, Pereda Suberbiola, Salgado.)	Late Barremian-early Aptian	Castrillo la Reina Formation	Spain	A rebbachisaurid sauropod.	
Drusilasaura	Gen. et sp.	Valid	Navarrete; Casal; Martínez	Cenomanian/Turonian	Bajo Barreal Formation	Argentina	A possible lognkosaurian titanosaur.	
Eodromaeus	Gen. et sp.	Valid	Martinez; Sereno; et al. (Note: Martinez, Sereno, Alcober, Colombi, Renne, Montañez, Currie.)	Middle Carnian	Ischigualasto Formation	Argentina	A basal theropod.	
Epichirostenotes	Gen. et sp.	Valid	Sullivan; Jasinski; Van Tomme	Late Campanian	Horseshoe Canyon Formation	USA	A caenagnathid.	
Haya	Gen. et sp.	Valid	Makovicky; Kilbourne; et al. (Note: Makovicky, Kilbourne, Sadleir, Norell.)	Late Cretaceous	Javkhlant Formation	Mongolia	Basal ornithopod with many gastroliths.	
Jaklapallisaurus	Gen. et. sp.	Valid	Novas; Ezcurra; et al. (Note: Novas, Ezcurra, Chatterjee, Kutty.)	Late Norian-earliest Rhaetian	Upper Maleri Formation; Lower Dharmaram Formation	India	A plateosaurid.	
Koreaceratops	Gen. et sp.	Valid	Lee; Ryan; Kobayashi	Albian	"Tando beds"	South Korea	A basal ceratopsian.	
Koreanosaurus	Gen. et sp.	Valid	Huh; Lee; et al. (Note: Huh, Lee, Kim, Lim, Godefroit.)	?Santonian/Campanian	Seonso Conglomerate	South Korea	A hypsilophodontid ornithopod.	
Leonerasaurus	Gen. et sp.	Valid	Pol; Garrido; Cerda	Pliensbachian/Toarcian	Las Leoneras Formation	Argentina	An anchisaurian sauropodomorph.	
Leyesaurus	Gen. et sp.	Valid	Apaldetti; Martinez; et al. (Note: Apaldetti, Martinez, Alcober, Pol.)	Lower Jurassic	Quebrada del Barro Formation	Argentina	A massospondylid sauropodomorph.	
Linhenykus	Gen. et sp.	Valid	Xu; Sullivan; et al. (Note: Xu, Sullivan, Pittman, Choiniere, Hone, Upchurch, Tan, Xiao, Tan, Han.)	Campanian	Wulansuhai Formation	China	An alvarezsaurid.	
Linhevenator	Gen. et sp.	Valid	Xu; Tan; et al. (Note: Xu, Tan, Sullivan, Han, Xiao.)	Campanian	Bayan Mandahu Formation	China	A short-armed troodontid.	
Manidens	Gen. et sp.	Vald	Pol; Rauhut; Becerra	Aalenian/Early Bathonian	Cañadón Asfalto Formation	Argentina	A heterodontosaurid.	
Nambalia	Gen. et. sp.	Valid	Novas; Ezcurra; et al.	Late Norian-earliest Rhaetian	Upper Maleri Formation	India	A basal sauropodomorph.	
Narambuenatitan	Gen. et sp.	Valid	Filippi; García; Garrido	lower-middle Campanian	Anacleto Formation	Argentina	A lithostrotian titanosaur.	
Ojoraptorsaurus	Gen. et sp.	Valid	Sullivan; Jasinski; Van Tomme	Lower Maastrichtian	Ojo Alamo Formation	USA	A caenagnathid.	
Omeisaurus jiaoi	Species	Valid	Jiang; Li; et al. (Note: Jiang, Li, Peng, Ye)	Middle Jurassic	Xiashaximiao Formation	China	A species of Omeisaurus.	
Osmakasaurus	Gen. et comb.	Valid	McDonald	Valanginian	Lakota Formation	USA	A new genus for "Camptosaurus" depressus (Gilmore, 1909).	
Oxalaia	Gen. et sp.	Valid	Kellner; Azvedo; et al. (Note: Kellner, Azvedo, Machado, Carvalho, Henriques.)	Cenomanian	Alcântara Formation	Brazil	Huge spinosaur 12–14 m long.	
Pampadromaeus	Gen. et sp.	Valid	Cabreira; Schultz; et al. (Note: Schultz, Bittencourt, Soares, Fortier, Silva, Langer.)	Carnian	Santa Maria Formation	Brazil	A very basal sauropodomorph.	
Pamparaptor	Gen. et sp.	Valid	Porfiri; Calvo; Santos	Turonian/Coniacian	Portezuelo Formation	Argentina	A deinonychosaur.	
Petrobrasaurus	Gen. et sp.	Valid	Filippi; Canudo; et al. (Note: Filippi, Canudo, Salgado, Garrido, Garcia, Cerda, Otero.)	Santonian	Plottier Formation	Argentina	A titanosaur.	
Propanoplosaurus	Gen. et sp.	Valid	Stanford; Weishampel; Deleon	Early Aptian	Patuxent Formation	USA	A nodosaurid.	
Qiupalong	Gen. et sp.	Valid	Xu; Kobayashi; et al. (Note: Xu, Kobayashi, Lü, Lee, Liu, Tanaka, Zhang, Jia, Zhang.)	Late Cretaceous	Qiupa Formation	China; Canada	An ornithomimid.	
Ratchasimasaurus	Gen. et sp.	Valid	Shibata; Jintasakul; Azuma	Aptian	Khok Kruat Formation	Thailand	A non-hadrosaurid iguanodontian.	
Sarahsaurus	Gen. et sp.	Valid	Rowe; Sues; Reisz	Sinemurian/Pliensbachian	Kayenta Formation	USA	A basal sauropodomorph	
Siamodon	Gen. et sp.	Valid	Buffetaut; Suteethorn	Aptian	Khok Kruat Formation	Thailand	An advanced iguanodontian.	
Spinops	Gen. et sp.	Valid	Farke; Ryan; et al. (Note: Farke, Ryan, Barrett, Tanke, Braman, Loewen, Graham.)	Campanian	Oldman or Dinosaur Park Formation	Canada	A centrosaurine ceratopsian.	
Stegoceras novomexicanum	Species	Valid	Jasinski; Sullivan	Late Campanian	Fruitland Formation; Kirtland Formation	USA	Second known species of Stegoceras.	
Talos	Gen. et sp.	Valid	Zanno; Varricchio; et al. (Note: Zanno, Varricchio, O'Connor, Titus, Knell.)	Late Campanian	Kaiparowits Formation	USA	A troodontid theropod.	
Tapuiasaurus	Gen. et sp.	Valid	Zaher; Pol; et al. (Note: Zaher, Pol, Carvalho, Nascimento, Riccomini, Larson, Juarez-Valieri, Pires-Domingues, da Silva Jr., Campos.)	Aptian	Quiricó Formation	Brazil	A titanosaur.	
Teratophoneus	Gen. et sp.	Valid	Carr; Williamson; et al. (Note: Carr, Williamson, Britt, Stadtman.)	Late Campanian	Kaiparowits Formation	USA	A tyrannosaurine tyrannosaurid.	
Thescelosaurus assiniboiensis	Species	Valid	Brown; Boyd; Russell	Late Maastrichtian	Frenchman Formation	USA	Third known species of Thescelosaurus.	
Titanoceratops	Gen. et sp.	Valid	Longrich	Late Campanian	Fruitland or Kirtland Formation	USA	A giant chasmosaurine ceratopsian from New Mexico.	
Traukutitan	Gen. et sp.	Valid	Juárez Valieri; Calvo	Santonian	Bajo de la Carpa Formation	Argentina	A possible lognkosaurian titanosaur.	
Uteodon	Gen. et comb.	Valid	McDonald	Late Jurassic	Morrison Formation	USA	A new genus for "Camptosaurus" aphanoecetes (Carpenter & Wilson, 2008).	
Veterupristisaurus	Gen. et sp.	Valid	Rauhut	Late Kimmeridgian/earliest Tithonian	Tendaguru Formation	Tanzania	A carcharodontosaurid.	
Xiaotingia	Gen. et sp.	Valid	Xu; You; et al. (Note: Xu, You, Du, Han.)	early Late Jurassic	Tiaojishan Formation	China	An Archaeopteryx-like paravian.	
Xuwulong	Gen. et sp.	Valid	You; Li; Liu	Early Cretaceous	Xinminpu Group	China	A hadrosauriform.	
Zhuchengtyrannus	Gen. et sp.	Valid	Hone; Wang; et al. (Note: Hone, Wang, Sullivan, Zhao, Chen, Li, Ji, Ji, Xu.)	Late Cretaceous	Wangshi Group	China	A tyrannosaurine tyrannosaurid.	

== Newly named birds ==
Name	Novelty	Status	Authors	Age	Unit	Location	Notes	Images
Alca carolinensis	Sp. nov	Valid	N. Adam Smith Julia A. Clarke	Early Pliocene	Yorktown Formation	USA: North Carolina	An Alcidae related to the razorbill.	
Alca minor	Sp. nov	Valid	N. Adam Smith Julia A. Clarke	Early Pliocene	Yorktown Formation	USA: North Carolina	An Alcidae related to the razorbill.	
Alca olsoni	Sp. nov	Valid	N. Adam Smith Julia A. Clarke	Early Pliocene	Yorktown Formation	USA: North Carolina	An Alcidae related to the razorbill.	
Alectroenas payandeei	Sp. nov	Valid	Julian Pender Hume	Holocene-Recent		Mauritius	A pigeon, Columbidae from Rodrigues Island.	
?Aptornis proasciarostratus	Sp. nov.	Valid	Trevor H. Worthy Alan J. D. Tennyson R. Paul Scofield	Early Miocene, Altonian	Manuherikia Group, St Bathans Fauna	New Zealand	The earliest known Aptornithidae Bonaparte, 1856.	
Ardea sytchevskayae	Sp. nov.	Valid	Nikita V. Zelenkov	Middle Miocene		Mongolia	An Ardeidae, earliest member of Ardea	
Aurorornis taurica	Gen. et sp. nov	Valid	Andrey V. Panteleyev	Eocene (Lutetian)		Crimean Peninsula	An owl belonging to the family Protostrigidae. The type species of the new genus.	
Australlus gagensis	Sp. nov.	Valid	Trevor H. Worthy Walter E. Boles	Oligocene-Miocene	Riverleigh	Australia: Queensland	A Rallidae. The type species is Gallinula disneyi Boles, 2005.	
Bohaiornis guoi	Gen. nov. et Sp. nov.	Valid	Hu Dongyu Li Li Hou Liannaim Xu Xing	Barremian/Aptian	Yixian Formation	China	An Enantiornithes Walker, 1981, Bohaiornithidae Wang, Zhou, O’Connor et Zelenkov, 2014.	
Buteo praebuteo	Sp. nov	Valid	Denis Sobolev in Sobolev & Marisova	Miocene		Ukraine	An Accipitridae, a species of Buteo.	
Buteo sarmathicus	Sp. nov	Valid	Denis Sobolev in Sobolev & Marisova	Miocene		Ukraine	An Accipitridae, a species of Buteo.	
Columba thiriouxi	Sp. nov	Valid	Julian Pender Hume	Holocene-Recent		Mauritius	A pigeon, Columbidae from Mauritius.	
Colymbiculus udovinchenkoi	Gen. et sp. nov	Valid	Gerald Mayr Evgenij Zvonok	Middle Eocene	Early Lutetian	Ukraine	A Gaviidae, this is the type species of the new genus.	
Cyrilavis colburnorum	Species	Valid	Daniel T. Ksepka Julia A. Clarke Lance Grande	Eocene	Green River Formation	USA: Wyoming	A Halcyornithidae Harrison et Walker, 1972, a stem Psittaciformes.	
Eostrix tsaganica	Sp. nov	Valid	Evgeney N. Kurochkin Gareth J. Dyke	Early Eocene		Mongolia	A Protostrigidae Wetmore, 1933.	
Falco bulgaricus	Sp. nov	Valid	Zlatozar N. Boev	Late Miocene		Bulgaria	A Falconidae.	
Feducciavis loftini	Gen. nov. et Sp. nov.	Valid	Storrs L. Olson	Middle Miocene	Calvert Formation	USA: Virginia	A Sternidae close to Anous and Procelsterna.	
Gallirallus steadmani	Sp. nov.	Valid	Trevor H. Worthy Robert Bollt	Quaternary	Subrecent	French Polynesia	A Rallidae as big as Gallirallus philippensis from Tubuai, Austral Islands.	
Gracilornis jiufotangensis	Gen. et sp.	Valid	Li Li Hou Shi-Lin	Aptian	Jiufotang Formation	China	An Enatiornithes Walker, 1981.	
Heterostrix tatsinensis	Gen. et sp. nov	Valid	Evgeney N. Kurochkin Gareth J. Dyke	Early Oligocene	Hsanda Gol Formation	Mongolia	A Heterostrigidae Fam. nov. Kurochkin & Dyke, 2011, this is the type species of the new genus and the type genus of the new family.	
Hoazinavis lacustris	Gen. et sp.	Valid	Gerald Mayr Herculano M. F. de Alvarenga Cécile Mourer-Chauviré	Late Oligocene/Early Miocene	Tremembé Formation	Brazil	An early Opisthocomidae.	
Itaboravis elaphrocnemoides	Gen. et sp.	Valid	Gerald Mayr Herculano M. F. de Alvarenga Julia A. Clarke	Early late Paleocene	Itaboraian	Brazil	A possible member of Cariamae. This is the type species of the new genus.	
Jamna szybiaki	Gen. et sp.	Valid	Zbigniew M. Bochenski Teresa Tomek Malgorzata Bujoczek Krzysztof Wertz	Oligocene	Carpathian flysch	Poland	An early Passeriformes.	
Kaiika maxwelli	Gen. et sp.	Valid	R. Ewan Fordyce Daniel Thomas	Early Eocene	Kauru Formation	New Zealand	A basal Spheniscidae.	
Laricola intermedia	Sp. nov.	Valid	Vanessa L. De Pietri Lodc Costeur Marcel Güntert Gerald Mayr	Early Miocene	MN 2a	France	A Charadriiformes, Laricolidae De Pietri, Costeur, Güntert et G. Mayr, 2011.	
Laricola robusta	Sp. nov.	Valid	Vanessa L. De Pietri Lodc Costeur Marcel Güntert Gerald Mayr	Early Miocene	MN 2a	France	A Charadriiformes, Laricolidae De Pietri, Costeur, Güntert et G. Mayr, 2011.	
Lavocatavis africana	Gen. et sp.	Valid	Cécile Mourer-Chauviré Rodolphe Tabuce M’hammed Mahboubi Mohammed Adaci Mustapha Bensalah	Eocene	Glib Zegdou Formation	Algeria	A Phorusrhacoidea.	
Luscinia jurcsaki	Sp. nov	Valid	Eugen Kessler Márton Venczel	Middle Miocene	MN 6–8	Romania	A member of the Muscicapidae	
Mancalla lucasi	Sp. nov	Valid	N. Adam Smith	Pliocene or Early Pleistocene	Niguel Formation San Diego Formation	USA: California	A Charadriiformes, Alcidae, Mancallinae L. H. Miller, 1946.	
Mancalla vegrandis	Sp. nov	Valid	N. Adam Smith	Pliocene or Early Pleistocene	San Diego Formation; San Mateo Formation	USA: California	A Charadriiformes, Alcidae, Mancallinae L. H. Miller, 1946.	
Miomancalla howardae	Gen. et sp. et comb. nov	Valid	N. Adam Smith	Late Miocene to Early Pliocene	Capistrano Formation; San Mateo Formation	USA: California	A Charadriiformes, Alcidae, Mancallinae L. H. Miller, 1946, this is the type species of the new genus, that also contains "Praemancalla" wetmorei Howard (1966).	
Mystiornis cyrili	Gen. et sp.	Valid	Evgeny N. Kurochkin Nikita V. Zelenkov Alexandr O. Averianov Sergei V. Leshchinskiy	Barremian/Aptian	Shestakovo-1 locality	Russian Federation		
Namaortyx sperrgebietensis	Gen. nov. et Sp. nov.	Valid	Cécile Mourer-Chauviré Martin Pickford Brigitte Senut	Middle Eocene	Probably Early Lutetian	Namibia	A Galliformes Incertae Sedis. This is the type species of the new genus.	
Nambashag billerooensis	Gen. nov. et Sp. nov.	Valid	Trevor H. Worthy	Late Oligocene/Early Miocene	Etadunna Formation	Australia: South Australia	A Phalacrocoracidae, this is the type species of the new genus.	
Nambashag microglaucus	Sp. nov.	Valid	Trevor H. Worthy	Late Oligocene/Early Miocene	Namba Formation	Australia: South Australia	A Phalacrocoracidae.	
Nelepsittacus minimus	Gen. nov. et sp. nov.	Valid	Trevor H. Worthy Alan J. D. Tennyson R. Paul Scofield	Early Miocene	St. Bathans Fauna, Manuherikia Section	New Zealand	A Psittaciformes, Nestoridae, smallest species of the genus and the type species of the new genus.	
Nelepsittacus donmertoni	Sp. nov.	Valid	Trevor H. Worthy Alan J. D. Tennyson R. Paul Scofield	Early Miocene	St. Bathans Fauna, Manuherikia Section	New Zealand	A Psittaciformes, Nestoridae.	
Nelepsittacus daphneleeae	Sp. nov.	Valid	Trevor H. Worthy Alan J. D. Tennyson R. Paul Scofield	Early Miocene	St. Bathans Fauna, Manuherikia Section	New Zealand	A Psittaciformes, Nestoridae.	
Nesoenas cicur	Sp. nov	Valid	Julian P. Hume	Holocene-Recent		Mauritius	A pigeon, Columbidae from Mauritius.	
Nogusunna conflictoides	Gen. nov et sp. nov	Valid	Nikita V. Zelenkov	Middle Miocene	Oshin Formation	Mongolia	A diving duck, Anatidae.	
Parahongshanornis chaoyangensis	Gen. et sp. nov.	Valid	Li Li Wang Jing-Qi Hou Shi-Lin	Early Cretaceous	Jiufotang Formation	China	A Hongshanornithidae O’Connor, Gao et Chiappe, 2010.	
Pellornis mikkelseni	Gen. et sp. nov	Valid	Sara Bertelli Luis M. Chiappe Gerald Mayr	Earliest Eocene	Fur Formation	Denmark	A Messelornithidae Hesse, 1988, this is the type species of the new genus.	
Piculoides saulcetensis	Gem. nov. et sp. nov.	Valid	Vanessa L. De Pietri Albrecht Manegold Lodc Costeur Gerald Mayr	Early Miocene	MN 2	France	A Picidae, this is the type species of the new genus.	
Protomelanitta gracilis	Gen. nov et sp. nov	Valid	Nikita V. Zelenkov	Middle Miocene	Oshin Formation	Mongolia	A diving duck, Anatidae, this is the type species of the new genus, a second species of the genus is Protomelanitta shihuibas (Hou, 1985), formally known as Aythya shihuibas Hou, 1985.	
Qiliania graffini	Gen. et sp.	Valid	Ji Shu-An Jessie Atterholt Jingmai K. O'Connor Matthew C. Lamanna Jerald D. Harris Li Da-Qing You Hai-Lu Peter Dodson	Aptian	Xiagou Formation	China	An Enantiornithes Walker, 1981.	
Sharganetta mongolica	Gen. nov et sp. nov	Valid	Nikita V. Zelenkov	Middle Miocene	Oshin Formation	Mongolia	A diving duck, Anatidae, this is the type species of the new genus.	
Sternalara milneedwardsi	Sp. nov.	Valid	Vanessa L. De Pietri Lodc Costeur Marcel Güntert Gerald Mayr	Early Miocene	MN 2a	France	A Charadriiformes, family Incertae Sedis.	
Sternalara minuta	Gen. nov. et sp. nov.	Valid	Vanessa L. De Pietri Lodc Costeur Marcel Güntert Gerald Mayr	Early Miocene	MN 2a	France	A Charadriiformes, family Incertae Sedis this is the type species of the genus.	
Tonsala buchanani	Sp. nov	jr synonym	Dyke, Wang, & Habib	Oligocene	Pysht Formation	USA; Washington	A plotopterid. Transferred it to Klallamornis(2021).	Klallamornis buchanani

== Newly named pterosaurs ==
Name	Novelty	Status	Authors	Age	Unit	Location	Notes	Images
Aurorazhdarcho	Gen. et sp.	Valid	Frey; Meyer; Tischlinger	Tithonian	Solnhofen limestone	Germany	An azhdarchoid or a ctenochasmatid. The type species, Aurorazhdarcho primordius, was subsequently found to be synonymous with "Pterodactylus" micronyx von Meyer (1856); however, Aurorazhdarcho was retained as a distinct genus, creating a new combination Aurorazhdarcho micronyx.	
Aussiedraco	Gen. et sp.	Valid	Kellner; Rodrigues; Costa	Albian	Toolebuc Formation	Australia	An ornithocheiroid.	
Barbosania	Gen. et sp.	Valid	Elgin; Frey	Cenomanian	Santana Formation	Brazil	An ornithocheirid.	
Darwinopterus robustodens	Species	Valid	Lü; Xu; et al. (Note: Lü, Xu, Chang, Zhang.)	Middle Jurassic	Tiaojishan Formation	China	A darwinopterid.	
Jianchangopterus	Gen. et sp.	Valid	Lü; Bo	Middle Jurassic	Tiaojishan Formation	China	A rhamphorhynchid.	
Navajodactylus	Gen. et sp.	Valid	Sullivan; Fowler	Late Campanian	Kirtland Formation; Dinosaur Park Formation	USA; Canada	A possible azhdarchid.	
Pterofiltrus	Gen. et sp.	Valid	Jiang; Wang	Early Cretaceous	Yixian Formation	China	A ctenochasmatid.	
Unwindia	Gen. et sp.	Valid	Martill	Cenomanian	Santana Formation	Brazil	A basal ctenochasmatoid.	
