= Gerald Cunningham =

Gerald Cunningham may refer to:

- Gerald Cunningham (writer) (1945–2019), New Zealand author, businessman and photographer
- Gerald Cunningham, founder of Gerry (company)
