= St Bathans =

Town in Otago, New Zealand

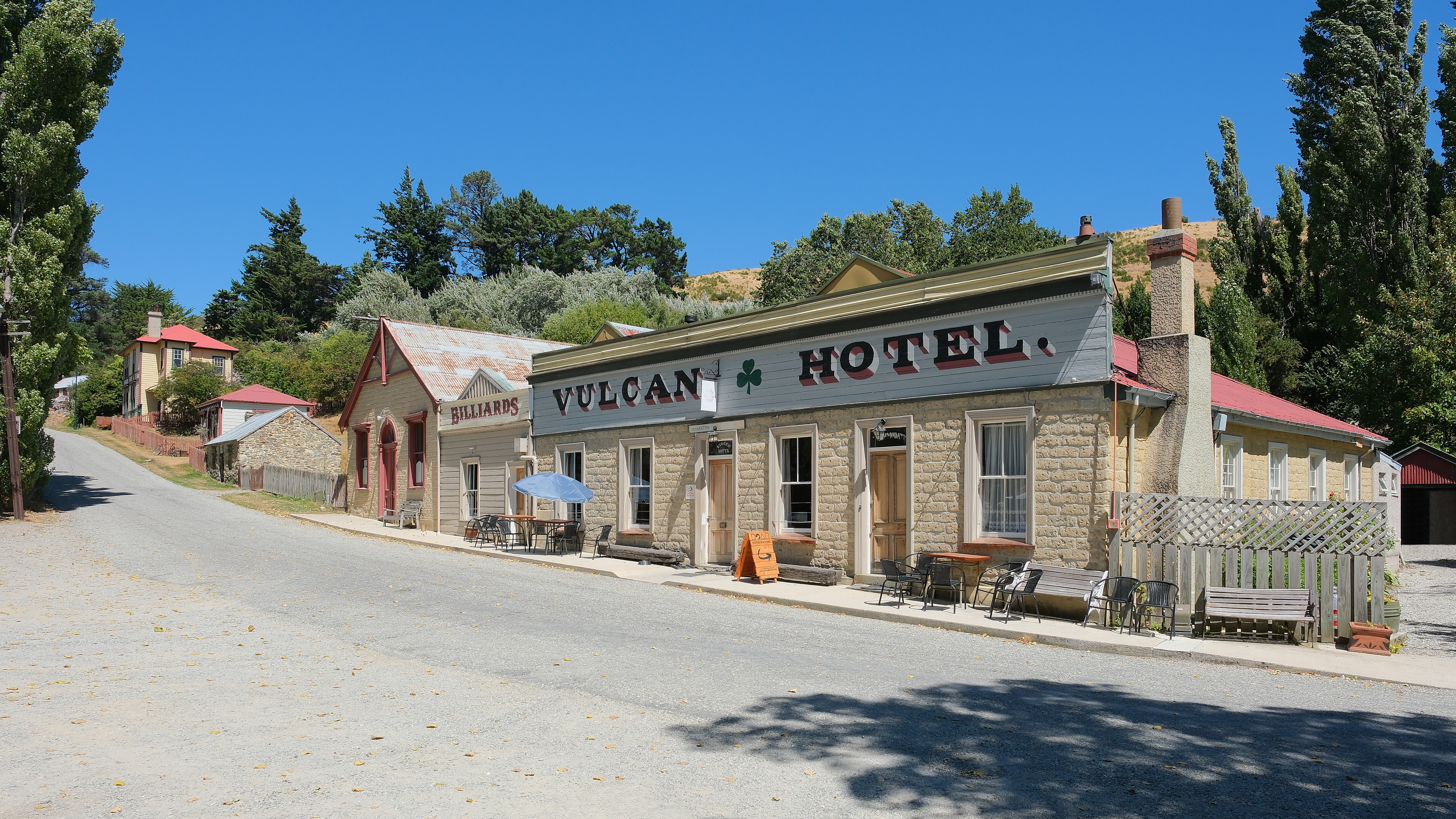
Historic town centre

St Bathans, formerly named Dunstan Creek, is a former gold and coal mining town in Central Otago, New Zealand. The settlement was a centre of the Otago gold rush, but mining has since long ceased. It is now largely a holiday retreat due to the preservation of many of its historic buildings.

St Bathans is well known for Blue Lake, a small man-made lake created by gold-sluicing that transformed the 120-metre high Kildare Hill into a 168-metre deep pit. After mining stopped in 1934, the hole accumulated water, which turned a distinctive blue hue due to minerals from the surrounding rocks. It is currently a camping spot, and swimming is allowed in the lake.

The town was named for the Scottish Borders village of Abbey St Bathans by early surveyor John Turnbull Thomson; the Scottish village was the birthplace of Thomson's maternal grandfather. It is 40 kilometres northwest of Ranfurly and 60 kilometres northeast of Alexandra, near the Dunstan Creek, beneath the St Bathans Range and Dunstan mountains.

The area attracts many visitors intent on gold-prospecting.

== Vulcan Hotel ==
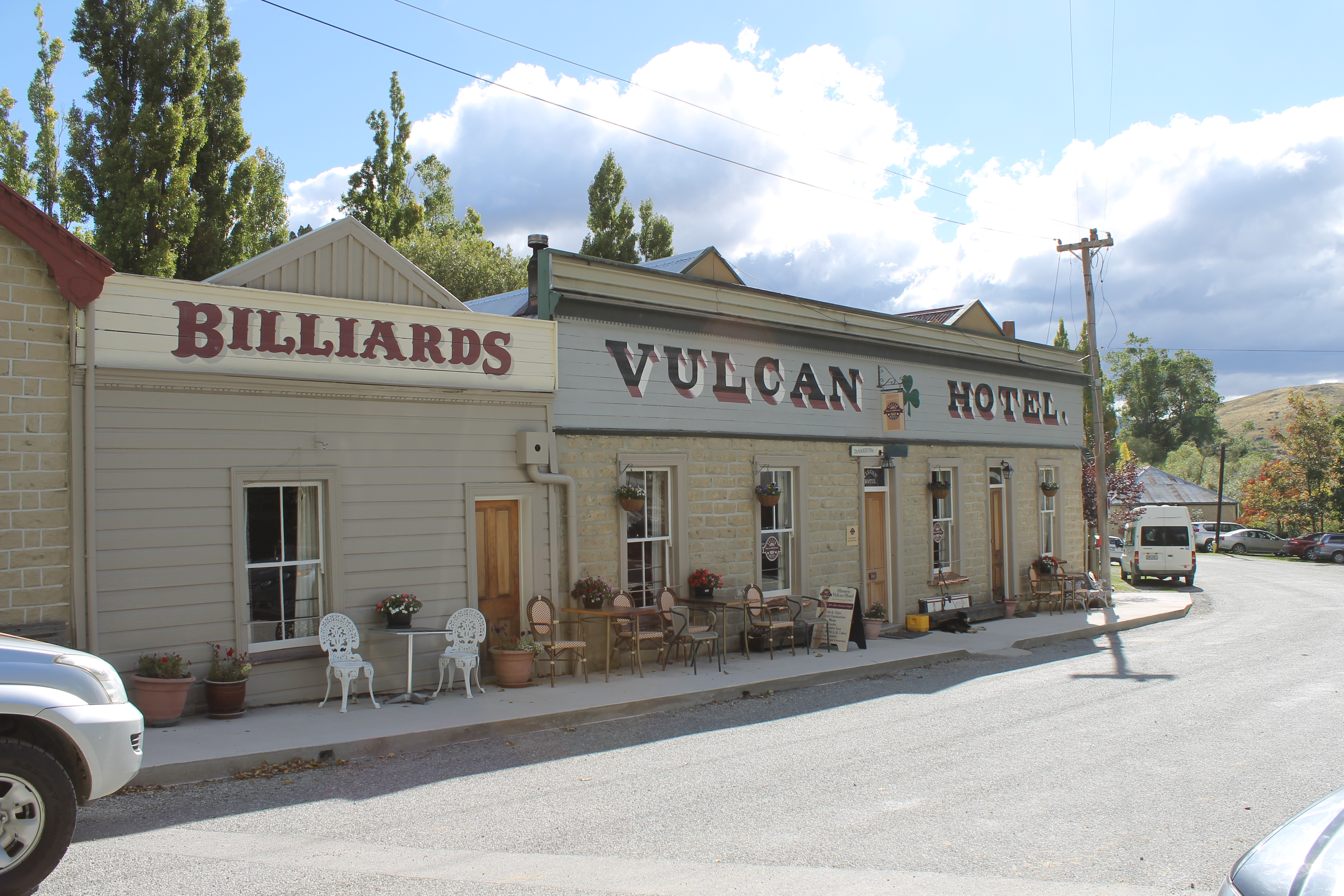
Vulcan Hotel, St Bathans

The Vulcan Hotel (at 44°52′15″S 169°48′40″E) is a restored public house located on the main street of St Bathans, and is the town's main tourist attraction. Originally called the Ballarat Hotel, the building was originally constructed in 1882 of mud brick. The building is registered as a Category I historic place by Heritage New Zealand. The building is notable as possibly the country's most famous haunted building. Room 1 of the hotel is reputedly home to the spirit of a young woman, thought by some to be a prostitute known "the Rose", who was strangled to death in the hotel in the 1880s.

== Geology and palaeontology ==
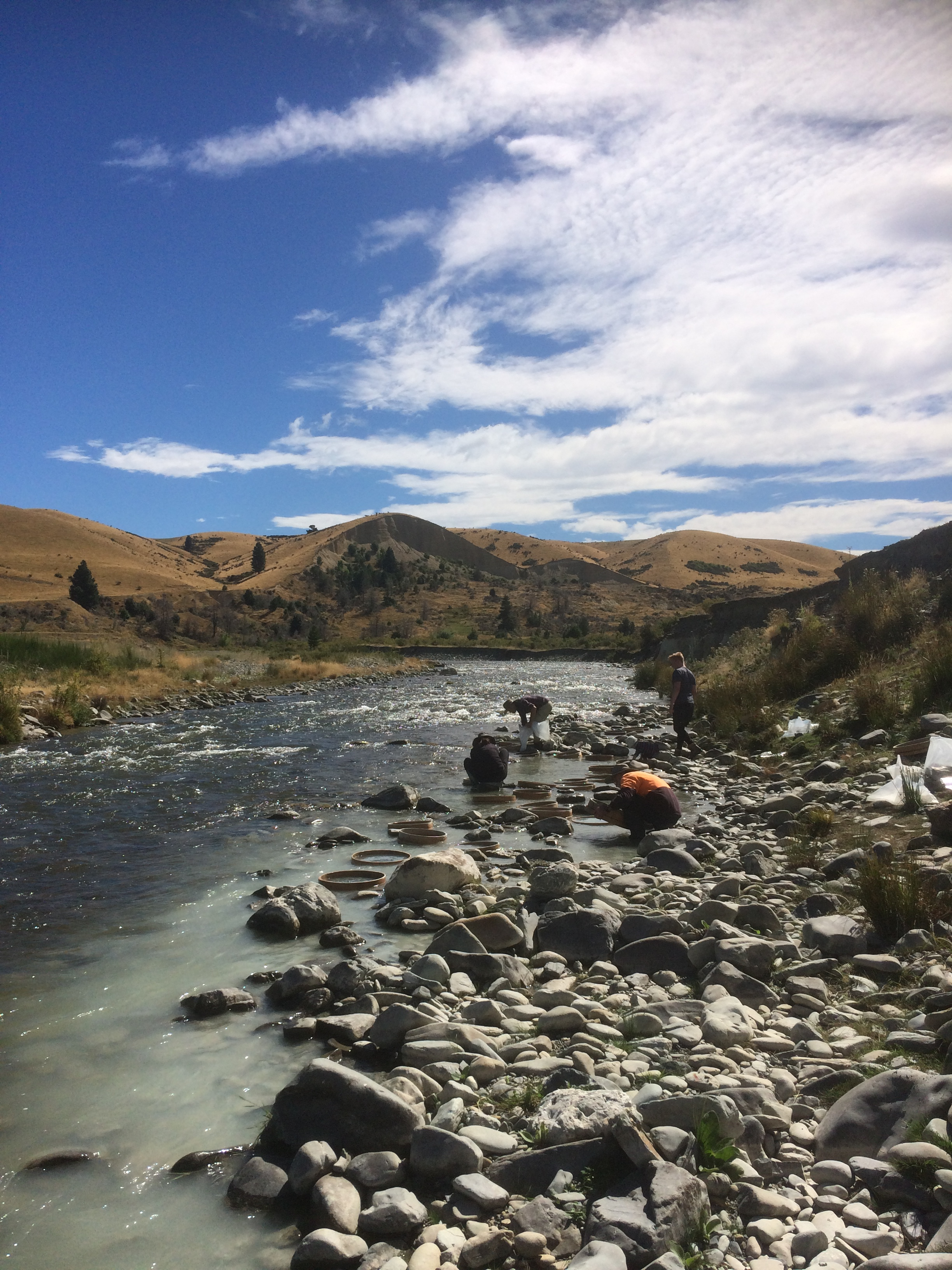
Palaeontologists sieving for fossils in the Manuherikia River

The town lends its name to the St Bathans fauna, a rich palaeontological section of the lower Bannockburn Formation of the Manuherikia Group, with an age range of 19–16 million years ago. The layer in which the fossils are found derives from littoral zone sediments deposited in a large shallow freshwater lake bordered by an extensive floodplains. The fossiliferous layer has been exposed at places along the Manuherikia River close to the town, and is the remnant of the prehistoric Lake Manuherikia.

=== St Bathans mammal ===
In 2006, scientists reported the finding of nontherian mammal fossils in the Manuherikia Group near St Bathans. Previously it had been thought that bats were the only terrestrial mammals native to New Zealand. Dubbed the SB mammal (for St Bathans), the scientists' analysis indicates that the creature has a lineage distinct from monotremes (egg-laying mammals), eutherians (placental mammals) and metatherians (marsupials).

=== Other taxa ===
The St Bathans formation also bears fossils of moa, mekosuchine crocodiles, turtles, skinks, tuatara, geckoes, at least eight taxa of waterfowl including the endemic Miotadorna and Manuherikia, a petrel, Accipitriformes, rails, a possible seagull, herons, a palaelodid flamingo, pigeons, parrots, a swift, an owlet-nightjar, songbirds, the enigmatic Aptornis and a primitive kiwi, Proapteryx.

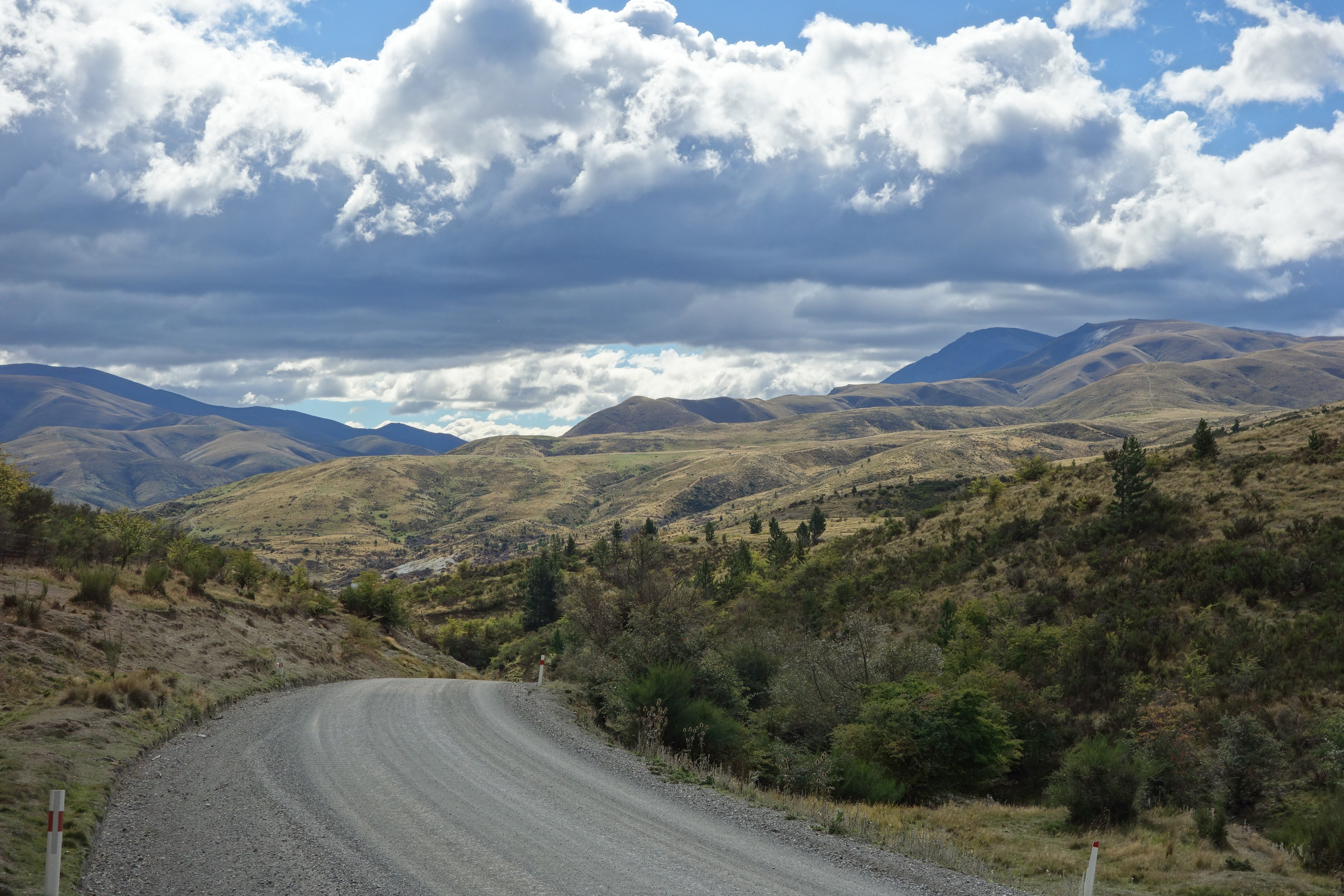
Road to Saint Bathans

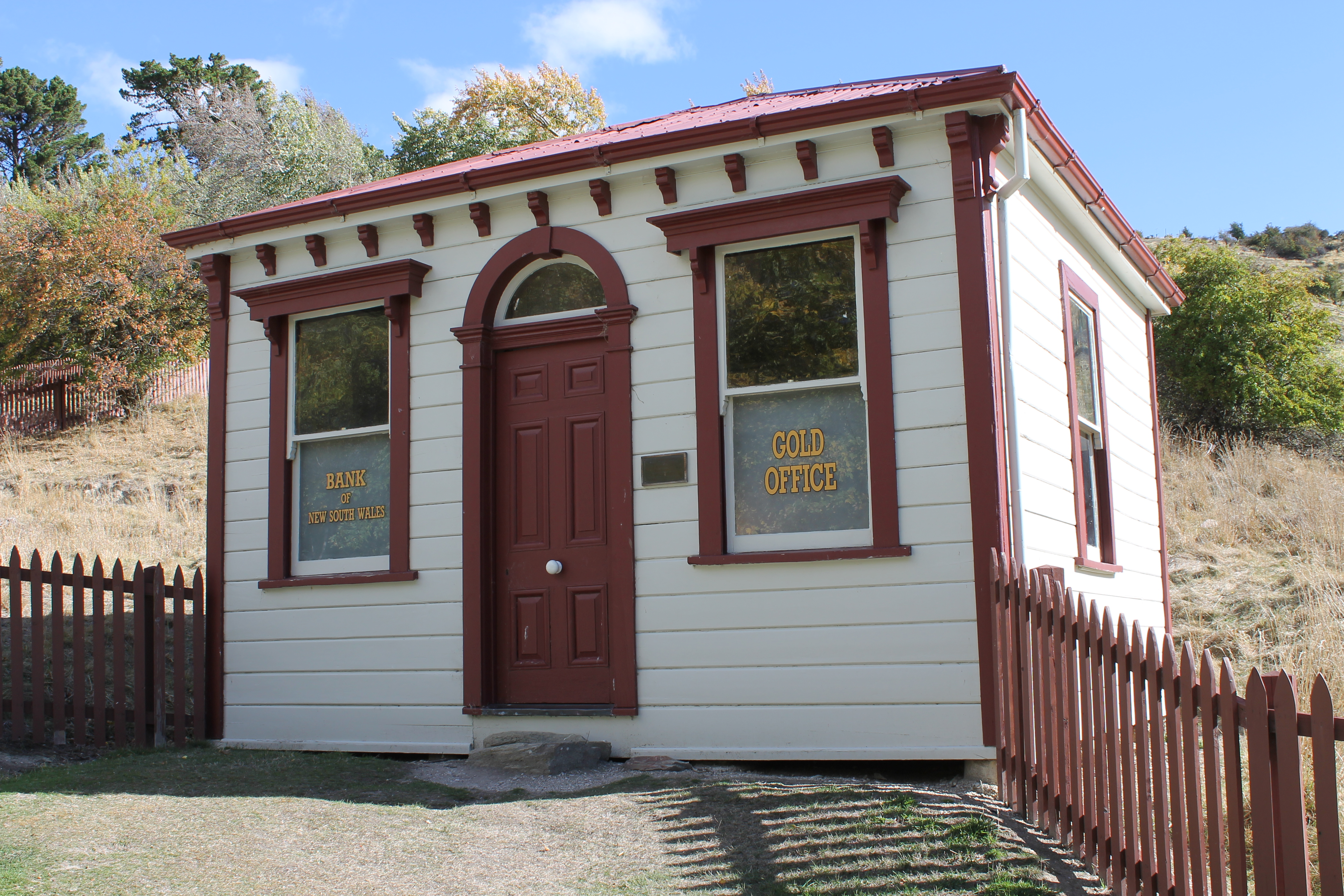
Old gold-buying office of the Bank of New South Wales, St Bathans, Central Otago

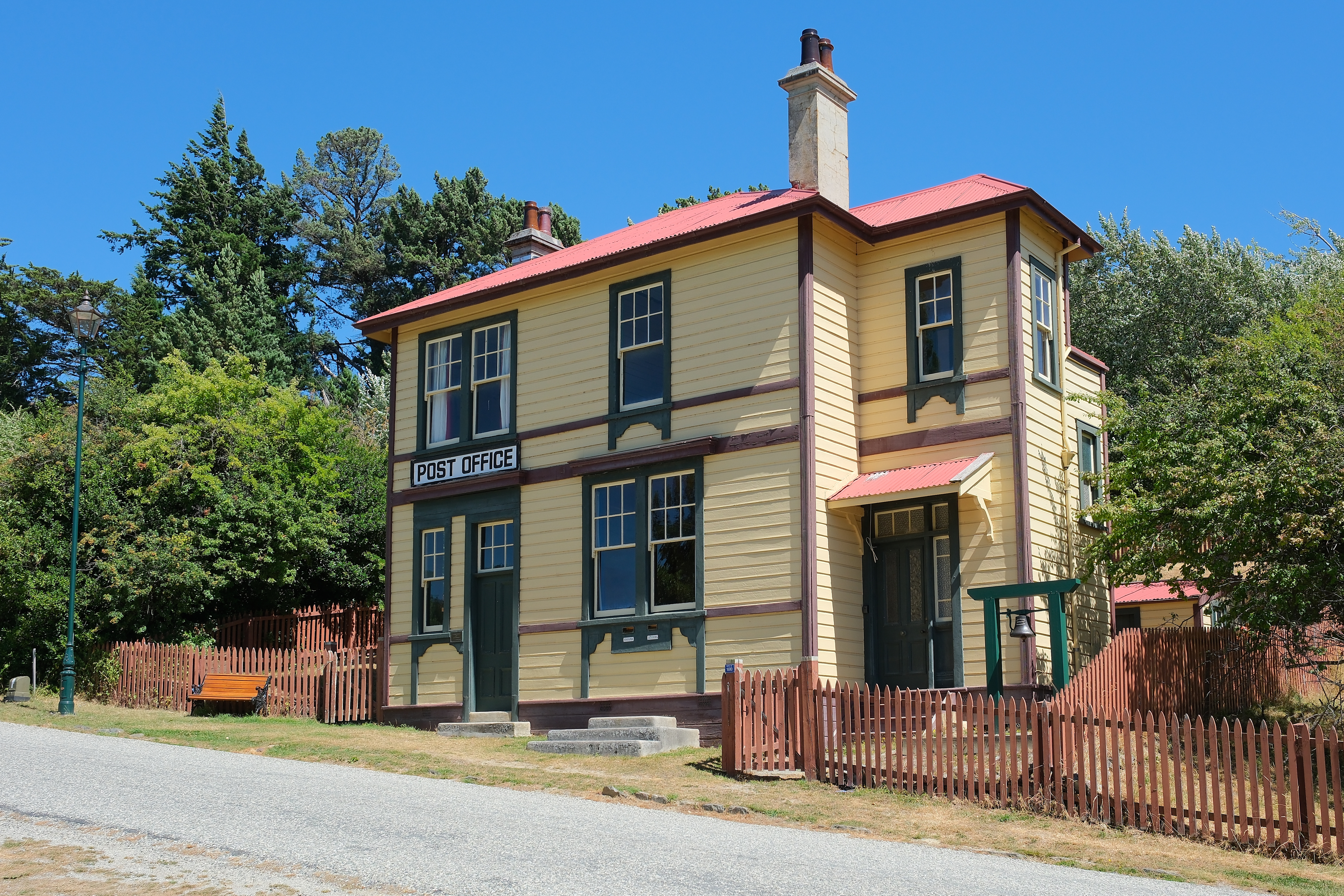
Former Post Office

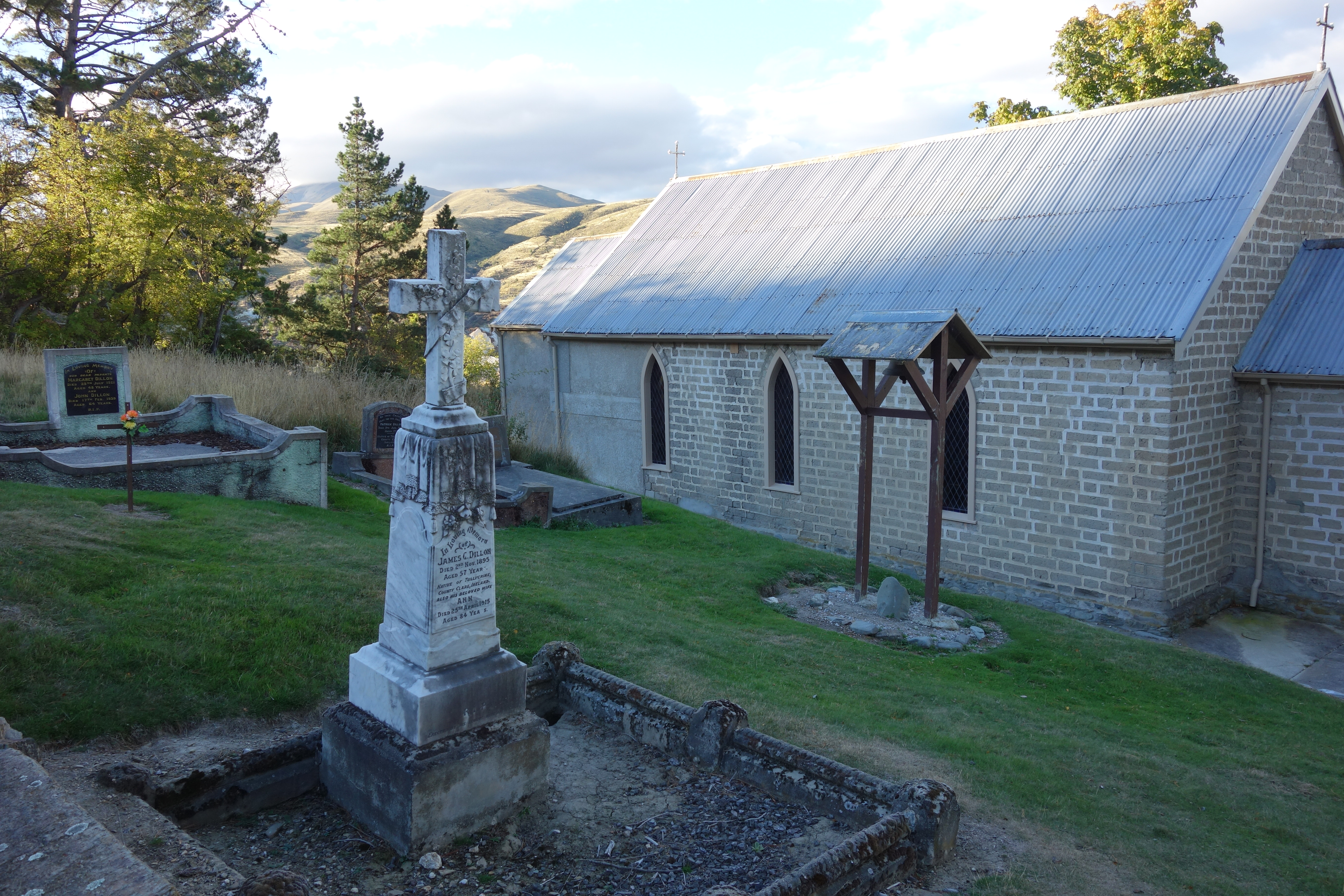
St. Patrick's Church

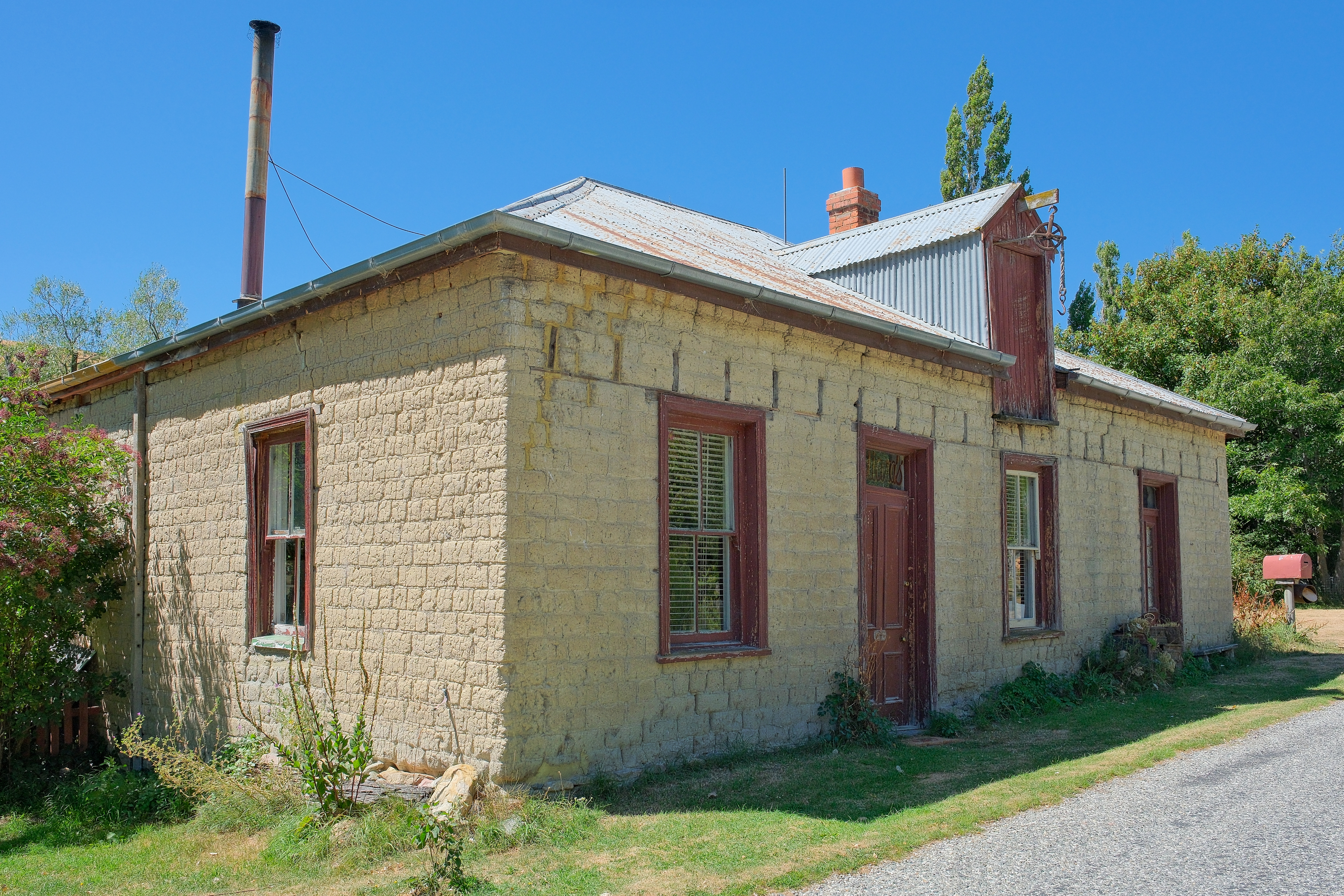
Former Vulcan Hotel Billiards Room and Stables

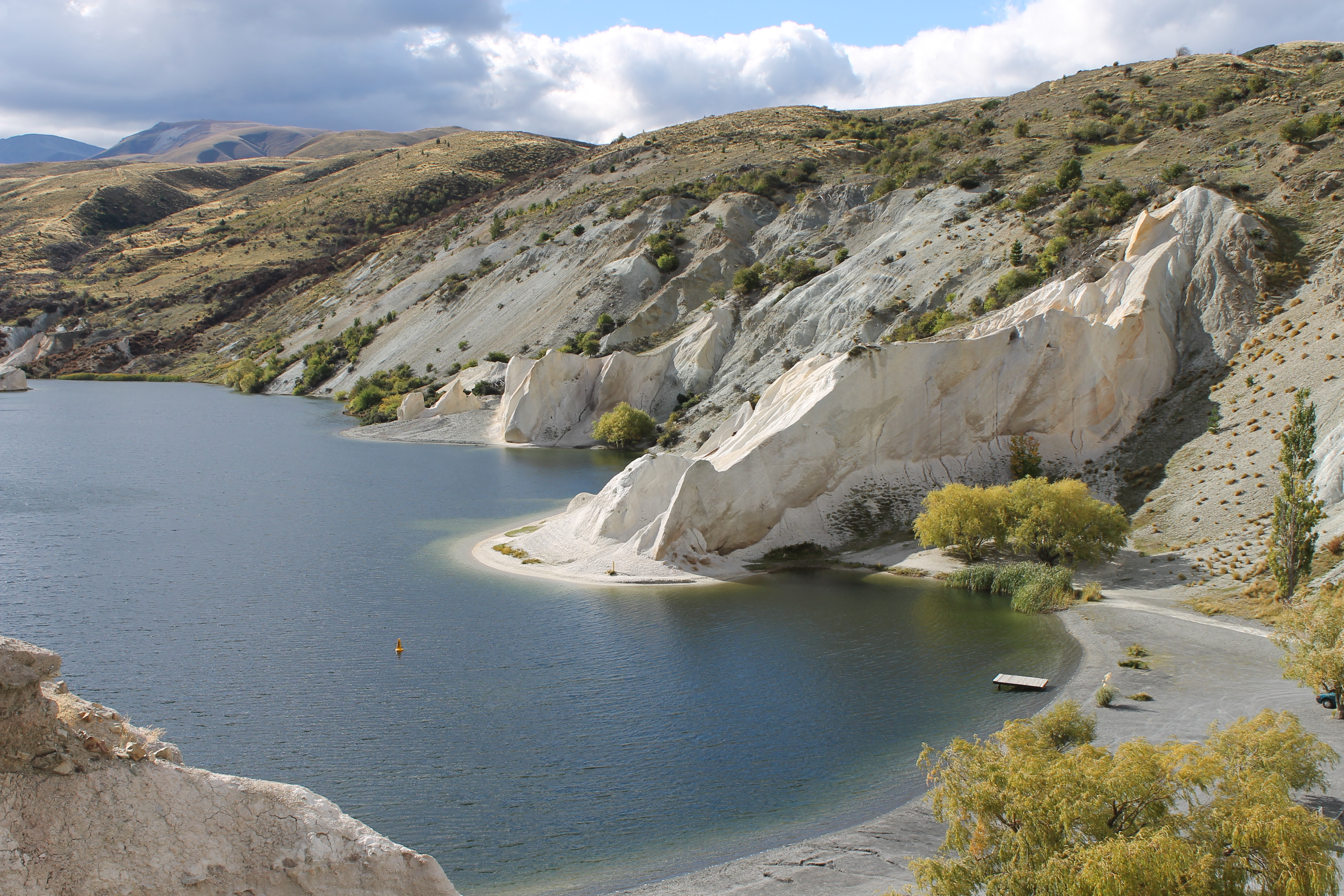
Blue Lake

== Climate ==
Climate data for Saint Bathans, elevation 585 m (1,919 ft), (1991–2020)
| Month | Jan | Feb | Mar | Apr | May | Jun | Jul | Aug | Sep | Oct | Nov | Dec | Year |
|---|---|---|---|---|---|---|---|---|---|---|---|---|---|
| Mean daily maximum °C (°F) | 22.6 (72.7) | 22.7 (72.9) | 20.2 (68.4) | 16.1 (61.0) | 12.5 (54.5) | 8.8 (47.8) | 8.3 (46.9) | 10.3 (50.5) | 13.6 (56.5) | 16.0 (60.8) | 17.9 (64.2) | 20.8 (69.4) | 15.8 (60.5) |
| Daily mean °C (°F) | 16.1 (61.0) | 15.8 (60.4) | 13.7 (56.7) | 10.3 (50.5) | 7.4 (45.3) | 4.1 (39.4) | 3.4 (38.1) | 5.6 (42.1) | 8.2 (46.8) | 10.1 (50.2) | 11.5 (52.7) | 14.2 (57.6) | 10.0 (50.1) |
| Mean daily minimum °C (°F) | 9.6 (49.3) | 8.9 (48.0) | 7.2 (45.0) | 4.5 (40.1) | 2.3 (36.1) | −0.6 (30.9) | −1.5 (29.3) | 0.6 (33.1) | 2.7 (36.9) | 4.3 (39.7) | 5.1 (41.2) | 7.6 (45.7) | 4.2 (39.6) |
| Average rainfall mm (inches) | 61.0 (2.40) | 47.0 (1.85) | 68.0 (2.68) | 58.0 (2.28) | 47.0 (1.85) | 49.0 (1.93) | 37.0 (1.46) | 35.0 (1.38) | 52.0 (2.05) | 58.0 (2.28) | 67.0 (2.64) | 67.0 (2.64) | 646 (25.44) |
Source: CliFlo (rain 1951–1980)
