= Matthew Bonnan =

American paleontologist, professor, singer/songwriter

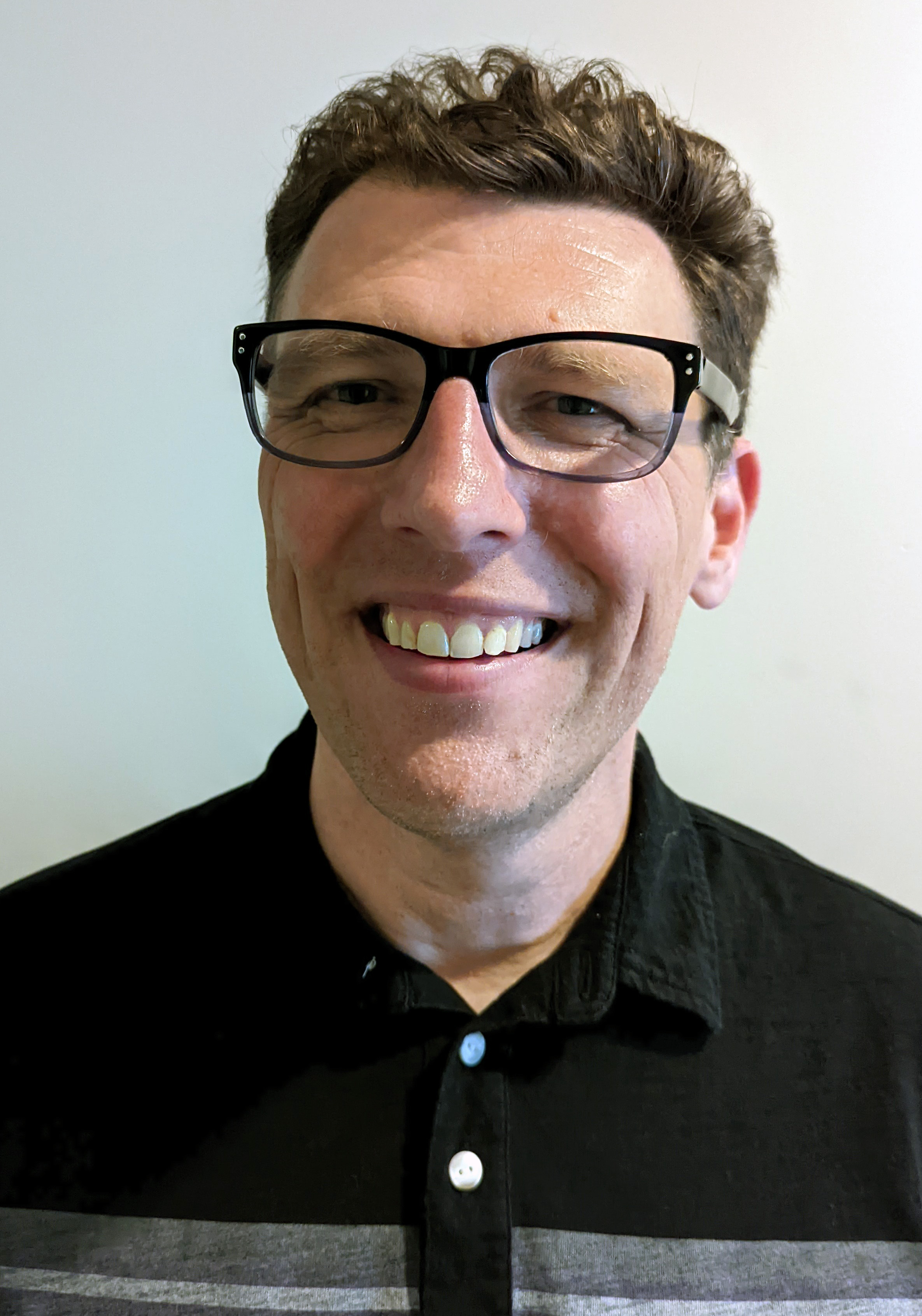
Matthew Bonnan in 2022

Matthew Bonnan is an American paleobiologist, a Professor of Biological Sciences at Stockton University, and as of 2021, a singer/songwriter. His research combines traditional descriptive and anatomical study with computer-aided morphometric analysis and modeling of vertebrate skeletons, and he is the co-discoverer of three new species of dinosaurs. He is the author of the book The Bare Bones: An Unconventional Evolutionary History of the Skeleton, designed to introduce undergraduates and curious lay readers to the anatomy and evolution of the vertebrate skeleton. Bonnan has a music/art outreach project, Once Upon Deep Time, a pop/rock song cycle about the evolution of hearing and our connection to the tree of life.

== Research and teaching ==
Bonnan's research focuses on three broad but interconnected areas of research: the evolution of dinosaur locomotion, particularly in the giant, long-necked sauropod dinosaurs; the evolution of an erect posture from a sprawled posture in dinosaurs and mammals; and the evolution of pronation and supination in the forelimb of tetrapods. To these ends, he uses traditional anatomical approaches as well as state-of-the-art computer modeling to understand and infer how the limbs of both extinct and extant tetrapods have evolved and adapted. He utilizes XROMM (X-ray Reconstruction of Moving Morphology) to produce three-dimensional animations of small animal bones in vivo. His research focuses on the three-dimensional kinematics of lizard and mammal forelimbs, as means to "reverse engineer" how early dinosaur and mammal relatives may have moved and stood.

Bonnan teaches a variety of anatomy-based and evolutionary biology courses at Stockton University covering diverse topics such as vertebrate embryology, comparative vertebrate anatomy, vertebrate evolution, systematics, dinosaurs, and general zoology.

== Education and early career ==
Bonnan grew up in Illinois, outside of Chicago. After finishing an internship at the Field Museum of Chicago, he entered the College of DuPage and earned an associates degree in Earth Sciences in 1993. He later earned his B.S. in Geological Sciences at University of Illinois at Chicago in 1995. He continued his education by earning a Ph.D., Northern Illinois University, Dept. Biological Sciences, in 2001. Bonnan worked as an associate professor at Western Illinois University through 2009. While employed at Western Illinois, Bonnan was part of a team that described a new dinosaur called Aardonyx which means "earth claw". This dinosaur is from the Early Jurassic and found in South Africa and is the result of three trips to South Africa, funded by National Geographic.

== Dinosaurs ==
Bonnan's overarching research focus is the evolution of dinosaur locomotion and its links to dinosaur gigantism. To this end:

- he has examined the evolution and shape of the manus (hand) and pes (foot) of sauropods and its relationship to locomotion and weight support
- he has studied the relationship between the ability to pronate the manus (place the hand palm-side down) in archosaurs and its expressions in sauropods and their ancestors
- he has used geometric morphometrics (geometry-based shape analysis techniques) to evaluate and statistically analyze patterns in sauropod long bone scaling
- he has studied the link between bipedalism, sexual dimorphism, and limb proportions in archosaurs using the American alligator (Alligator mississippiensis) as a model
- he has searched for and described a new transitional dinosaur (Aardonyx celestae) from the Early Jurassic of South Africa that sheds much-needed light on the beginnings of sauropod gigantism
- he and colleagues have shown how to infer the missing joint shape in dinosaur long bones based on shape analysis of Alligator mississippiensis and two species of birds
- he and colleagues provide evidence that thick, compliant cartilaginous joints may have been one of several factors that enabled dinosaur gigantism
- he and colleagues have shown via biomechanical models that the elbow joint of sauropod dinosaurs must have contained a large cartilaginous prominence to enable the elbow to function properly

== XROMM (X-ray Reconstruction of Moving Morphology) ==
Recently, Bonnan's research focuses on the three-dimensional kinematics of lizard and mammal forelimbs, as means to "reverse engineer" how early dinosaur and mammal relatives may have moved and stood, using the XROMM technique pioneered at Brown University.

- In 2016, Bonnan and colleagues published on the kinematics (movements) of the forelimb long bones in rats using XROMM. Bonnan and his colleagues showed that long axis rotations occurred in the humerus and radius bones of rats. Bonnan and colleagues suggested that, given the morphological similarity of rat forelimb bones and those of some of the earliest eutherian (placental) mammals, our early mammal ancestors may have clambered through the trees and overground in a manner similar to rats.
- Videos of the reconstructed forelimb bone movements in rats can be viewed on Bonnan's YouTube channel
- Currently, Bonnan has begun working with lizards, particularly bearded dragons and monitors, to study the 3-D kinematics of lizard forelimb locomotion.

== Significant discoveries ==
Bonnan is a co-discoverer of the almost-sauropod Aardonyx celestae which has garnered international media attention and should serve to illuminate the early beginnings of sauropod gigantism. He is a co-discoverer of an early "prosauropod" Arcusaurus pereirabdalorum. He is a co-discoverer of an early true sauropod Pulanesaura eocollum.

In the spring of 2008, Bonnan was involved with a new Morrison Formation dinosaur quarry in Hanksville, Utah. His expertise in the concentration of Sauropod dinosaurs metapodials (and/or caudal vertebrae) aided the excavation efforts of the Burpee Museum of Natural History. After leaving Illinois to join Stockton University in New Jersey, it became logistically difficult for Bonnan to work the Burpee and he is no longer involved with the Hankville quarry.

== The Bare Bones: An Unconventional Evolutionary History of the Skeleton ==
In 2016, Bonnan published a book, The Bare Bones: An Unconventional Evolutionary History of the Skeleton, designed to introduce undergraduates and curious lay readers to the anatomy and evolution of the vertebrate skeleton. Bonnan's book approaches the topic of vertebrate evolution from the perspective of the skeleton as a living machine, using analogies with technology and tools to help readers understand how vertebrate animals "work." Since its publication, the book has received several positive reviews.

== Once Upon Deep Time ==
In 2021, Bonnan conceived of, composed, performed, recorded, and produced demos of the 12 songs that would become his music/art outreach project, Once Upon Deep Time. Once Upon Deep Time is a pop/rock song cycle about the evolution of hearing in vertebrates. According to Bonnan on the Once Upon Deep Time website, "I created these songs to inspire wonder about our shared natural history and to convey the passion that drives me as a scientist. These 12 original songs tell a story, based on what we know from fossils and the living world around us, about how we came to perceive sound and how sound connects us to a living past."

== Awards ==
Bonnan received the 1999 Alfred S. Romer Prize from the Society of Vertebrate Palentology. He received the 2016 Distinguished Alumni Award from DuPage College.
