= Tubuai rail =

Tubuai rail Temporal range: Late Holocene

Conservation status
- Extinct

Scientific classification
- Kingdom: Animalia
- Phylum: Chordata
- Class: Aves
- Order: Gruiformes
- Family: Rallidae
- Genus: Gallirallus
- Species: †G. steadmani

Binomial name
- †Gallirallus steadmani Worthy & Bollt, 2011

Extinct species of bird

The Tubuai rail (Gallirallus steadmani) is an extinct species of flightless bird in the Rallidae, or rail family.

== History ==
It was described from subfossil remains found in 2007 by Robert Bollt at the Atiahara archaeological site, on the island of Tubuai in the Austral Islands of French Polynesia. The site dates to the 13th and 14th centuries CE, from the early period of human habitation of the island.

== Etymology ==
The species was named after David Steadman in recognition of his contributions to Pacific paleo-ornithology and the understanding of the radiation of Gallirallus-like rails.
