= Blue Lake (Otago) =

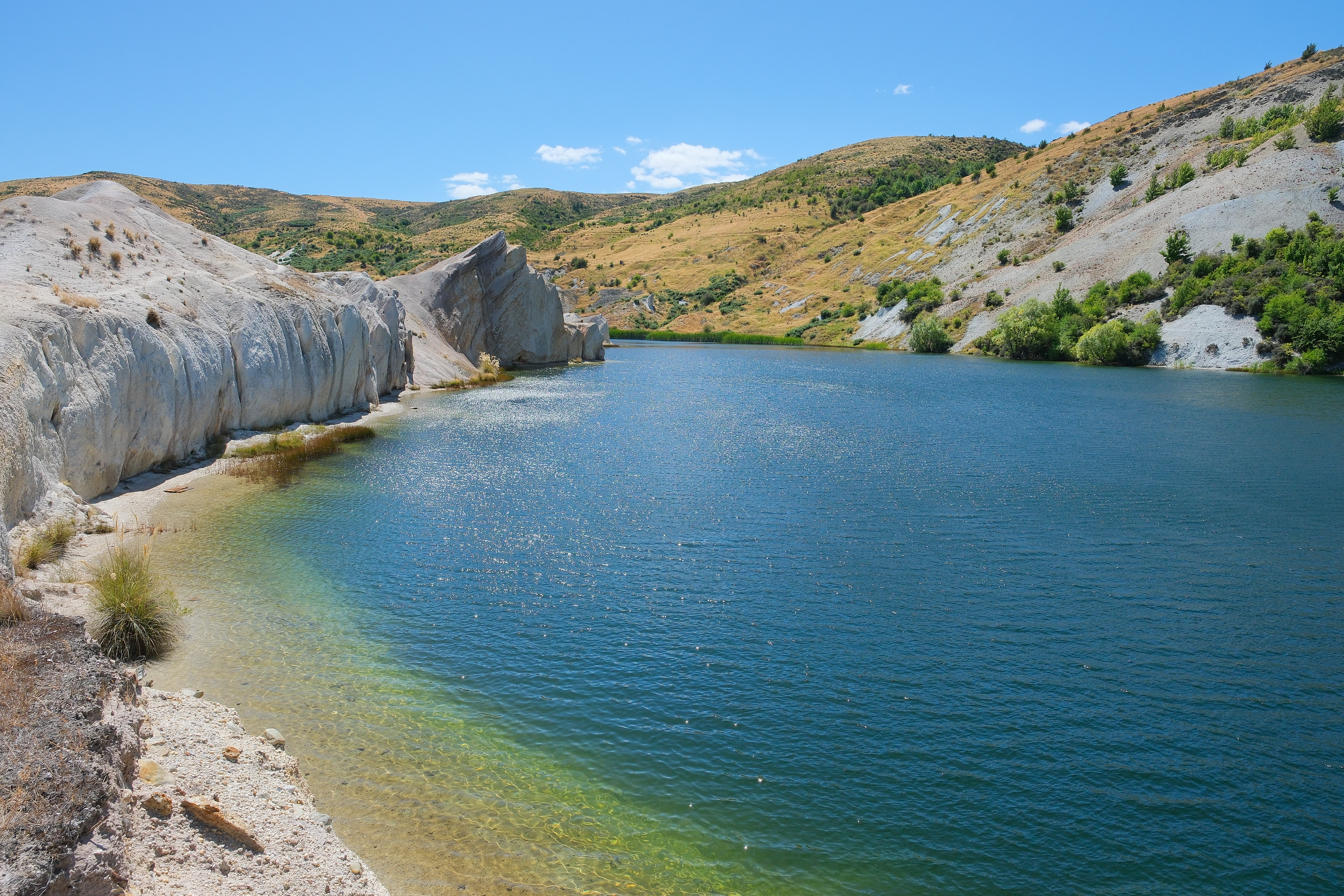
- Quartz gravel shore of Blue Lake

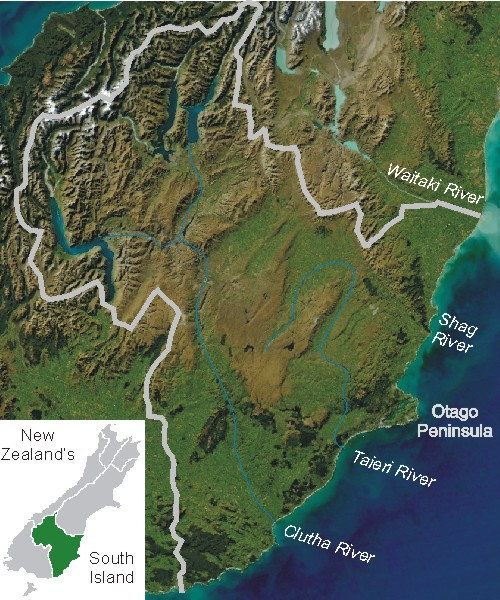
- Location within Otago peninsula
- Location: Otago region, South Island
- Coordinates: 44.866485°S 169.810417°E
- Type: Reservoir
- Basin countries: New Zealand

Blue Lake is a small lake adjacent to the town of Saint Bathans in Central Otago, New Zealand. The lake is man-made, the result of sluicing operations that began in 1873 when John Ewing (1844–1922) formed the St.Bathans Channel Company, to mine the Kildare Hill Gold Claim in St Bathans. His company constructed a tailings channel and introduced hydraulic elevating to work the claim. As this work progressed the Kildare Hill Claim became the site of the deepest hydraulic elevating operation in the world, that would turn a 120-metre hill into a 68-metre hole. Work stopped in 1902 when there was insufficient fall in the tailings channel to carry away the tailings. By 1905 John Ewing was bankrupt as a result of poor investments in other locations. The Kildare Hill Claim was then taken up by the Scandinavian Water Race Company in that year. This company restarted operations and worked the claim until 1932, when it was finally abandoned due to the fear of undermining the town of St Bathans. Natural drainage from the surrounding hills filled the hole with water and created the present day lake. The Blue Lake is a key feature of modern-day St. Bathans and is used for swimming, fishing, bodyboarding, and kayaking.

== Sources ==
- Guide to the Otago Goldfields Heritage Trail, Gerald Garrick Cunningham, 2004
