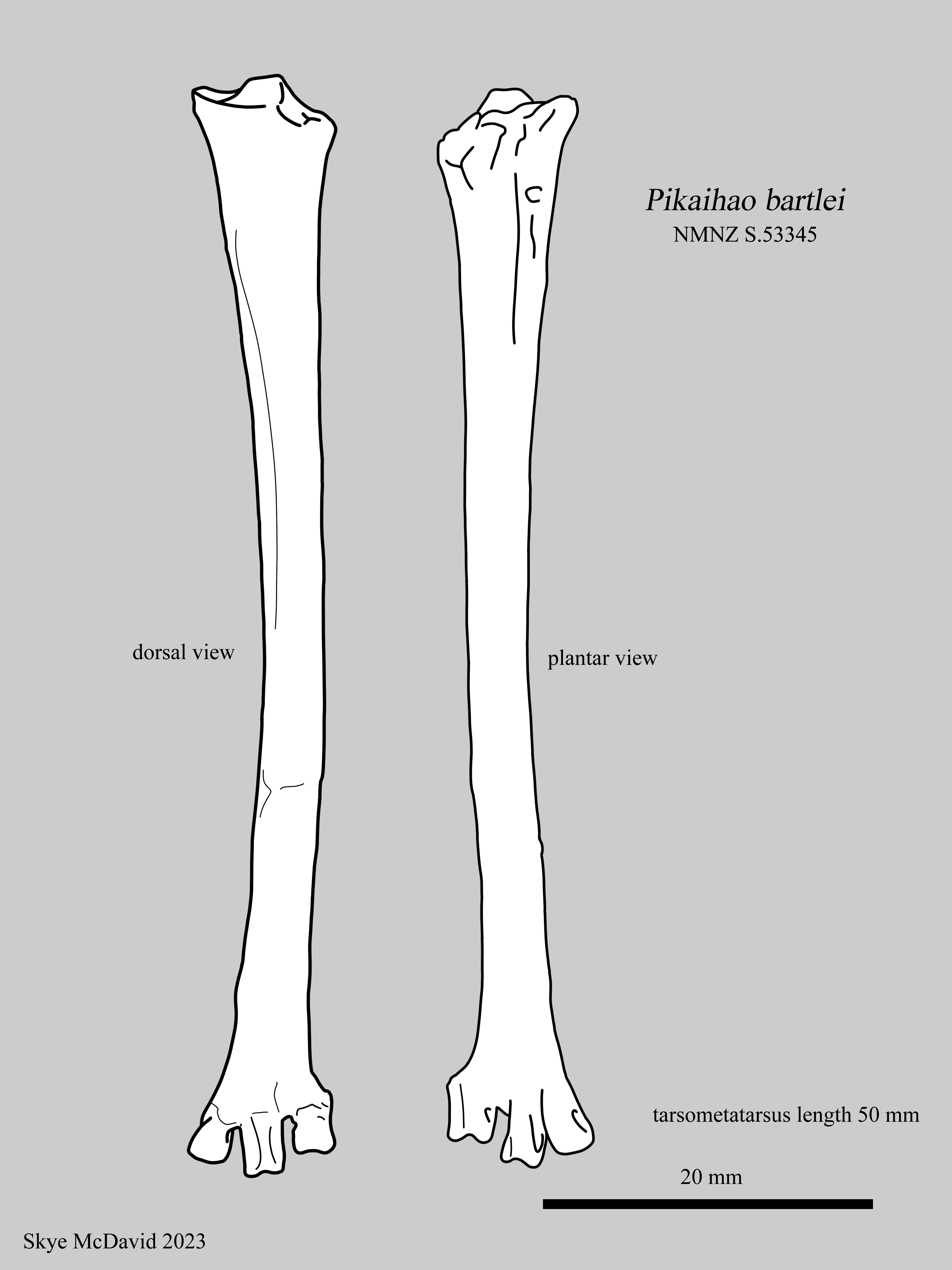
- Holotype tarsometatarsus

Scientific classification
- Kingdom: Animalia
- Phylum: Chordata
- Class: Aves
- Order: Pelecaniformes
- Family: Ardeidae
- Subfamily: Botaurinae
- Genus: †Pikaihao; Worthy et al., 2013
- Species: †P. bartlei

Binomial name
- †Pikaihao bartlei Worthy et al., 2013

= Pikaihao =

Pikaihao Temporal range: Early Miocene

Extinct genus of birds

Pikaihao bartlei, also referred to as Bartle's bittern or the Saint Bathans bittern, is a genus and species of prehistoric small bittern from the Early Miocene of New Zealand. It was described in 2013 from fossil material (a left tarsometatarsus and a cranial part left coracoid) found in the Saint Bathans Fauna of the Bannockburn Formation, at Home Hills Station in the Manuherikia River valley of Otago, South Island. It was a contemporary of the much larger Saint Bathans heron, remains of which have been found in the same sediments. The genus name Pikaihao comes from the Māori pi (a prefix for small birds or chicks) and kaihao (“fisherman”). The specific epithet honours Sandy Bartle, Curator of Birds at the Museum of New Zealand Te Papa Tongarewa from 1976 to 2009.
