= Matuku otagoense =

Matuku otagoense Temporal range: Early Miocene 19–16 Ma

Scientific classification
- Domain: Eukaryota
- Kingdom: Animalia
- Phylum: Chordata
- Class: Aves
- Order: Pelecaniformes
- Family: Ardeidae
- Genus: †Matuku; Scofield et al., 2010
- Species: †M. otagoense

Binomial name
- †Matuku otagoense Scofield et al., 2010

Extinct species of bird

Matuku otagoense, also referred to as the Saint Bathans heron, is an extinct genus and species of heron from the Early Miocene of New Zealand. It was described from fossil material collected in 2007 from the Saint Bathans fauna of the Bannockburn Formation in Otago, South Island. It was a contemporary of the much smaller Saint Bathans bittern, remains of which have been found in the same sediments. The genus name matuku is a Māori-language word meaning “heron” or "bittern". The specific epithet is a latinisation of the name of the Otago region where the descriptive material was collected.
