= Frostline Kits =

US company

Coordinates: 39.1126809°N 108.6250436°W

- Industry: DIY outdoor gear
- Founded: 1966; 60 years ago in Boulder, Colorado, United States
- Founder: Dale Johnson
- Defunct: 2009
- Fate: decline of the kit industry generally
- Successor: Frostline Kits, division of Gillette; Insport, Grand Junction, Colorado; Frostline Kits, Grand Junction, Colorado
- Headquarters: Boulder, Colorado

Frostline Kits was a Colorado-based company that produced sew-it-yourself kits for outdoor gear including clothing and tents.

While it operated, it provided a cost-effective alternative to manufactured gear.

== History ==
Frostline was founded in 1966 by Gerry alumnus Dale Johnson in Boulder, Colorado. It was at its founding a mail-order company. The company grew to eighteen retail stores by 1978. At its peak, it had spawned competitors, including Altra Kits, Sundown Kits, Holubar Carikits, Plain Brown Wrapper Kits, and EMS (Eastern Mountain Sports) Kits.

In 1978, the company was acquired by Gilette. Gillette had little success in the segment. It liquidated the company in 1983.

In 1984, Insport of Grand Junction, Colorado bought the Frostline name and intellectual property from Gillette and resumed sales of kits. In 2000, Insport failed.

In 2000 the company reorganized as Frostline Kits USA, LLC, also based in Grand Junction. Between 2007 and 2009, that company ceased operations.

== Products ==
Frostline began with kits for parkas and sleeping bags. The range of products eventually extended to backpacks and other textile gear. These kits offered do-it-yourselfers a chance to save 50% from the cost of manufactured goods.

== Case study ==
The concept and company succeeded in a time when outdoor recreation was growing, new materials had revolutionized outdoor gear, and manufactured goods were relatively expensive. Its growth paralleled The North Face, also founded in 1966. North Face was also in financial trouble in 2000. Offshore manufacturing that saved North Face was the death knell for Frostline. Like Heathkit, a producer of kits for electronic gear, its line of kits could no longer compete with imported manufactured goods.
