= Miotadorna =

Miotadorna Temporal range: Early Miocene 19–16 Ma

Scientific classification
- Kingdom: Animalia
- Phylum: Chordata
- Class: Aves
- Order: Anseriformes
- Family: Anatidae
- Subfamily: Anatinae
- Genus: †Miotadorna; Worthy et al., 2007

Type species
- †Miotadorna sanctibathansi Worthy et al., 2007

Synonyms
- †Miotadorna catrionae (Tennyson et al., 2022)

Extinct genus of birds

Miotadorna is a genus of extinct tadornine ducks from the Miocene of New Zealand. It contains two species, M. sanctibathansi, and M. catrionae (Catriona's shelduck).

== M. sanctibathansi ==
M. sanctibathansi was described from a fossilised right humerus collected from the Saint Bathans Fauna, in the lower Bannockburn Formation of the Manuherikia Group, found by the Manuherikia River in the Central Otago region of the South Island. The genus name reflects the view of the describers that the bird is a Miocene shelduck similar to those in the genus Tadorna. The specific epithet refers to the fossil sites’ location in the vicinity of the historic gold mining town of Saint Bathans, of which it is a latinisation.

== M. catrionae ==
M. catrionae, described and named in 2022, is the largest duck species so far discovered in the St Bathans fossil deposits. Both the species name, catrionae, and the common name, Catriona's shelduck, honour co-author Nicholas J. Rawlence's late mother Catriona Drummond. The holotype specimen is a large right humerus. It is noted as being very similar to M. sanctibathansi, but its large size and differing proportions distinguish it from that species. This size difference may represent sexual dimorphism, although the morphological changes are not sufficiently explained by this. Worthy et al., (2022) considered M. catrionae to be a synonym of M. sanctibathansi, as they believed it was more likely that the larger specimen represented a larger sex.
