= X-ray Reconstruction of Moving Morphology =

X-ray Reconstruction of Moving Morphology or XROMM is a scientific research technique. Scientists use it to create 3D images and videos of moving skeletal systems in living organisms.

In XROMM, radio-opaque bone markers are implanted inside a living organism, which allows the X-ray video system to calculate accurate bone marker coordinates as the organism moves.

XROMM was invented at Brown University.

XROMM can be used to model such movements as birds in flight, humans running, frogs jumping, and a toad swallowing its prey.

== Original description ==
Brainerd, E. L.; Baier, D. B.; Gatesy, S. M.; Hedrick, T. L.; Metzger, K. A.; Gilbert, S. L.; Crisco, J. J. (2010). "X-ray reconstruction of moving morphology (XROMM): precision, accuracy and applications in comparative biomechanics research". Journal of Experimental Zoology Part A: Ecological Genetics and Physiology. 313A (5): 262–279. doi:10.1002/jez.589.
