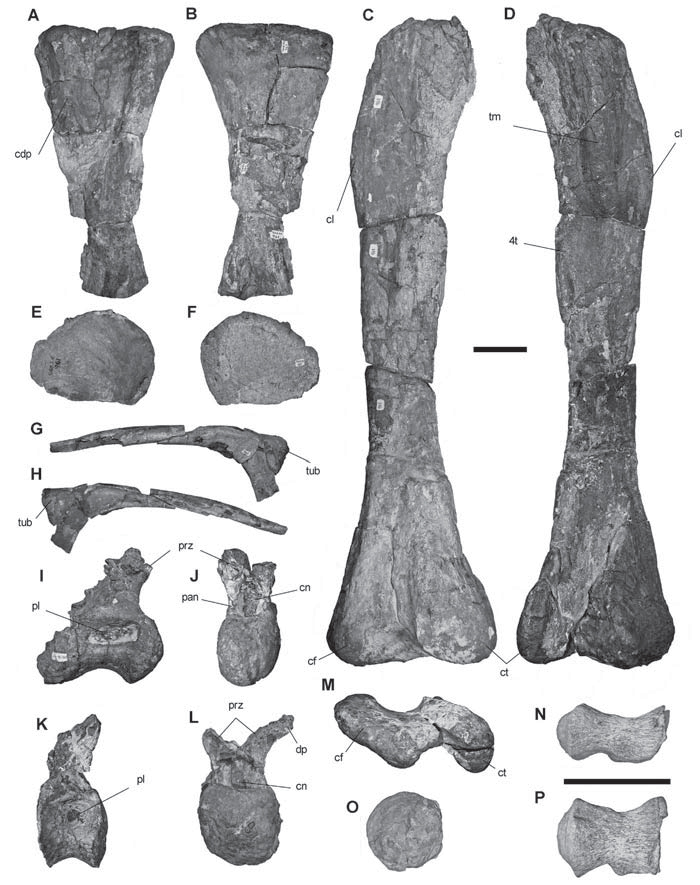
- Holotype SGO-PV-961

Scientific classification
- Kingdom: Animalia
- Phylum: Chordata
- Class: Reptilia
- Clade: Dinosauria
- Clade: Saurischia
- Clade: †Sauropodomorpha
- Clade: †Sauropoda
- Clade: †Macronaria
- Clade: †Titanosauria
- Clade: †Lithostrotia
- Genus: †Atacamatitan; Kellner et al., 2011

Type species
- †Atacamatitan chilensis Kellner et al., 2011

= Atacamatitan =

Atacamatitan Temporal range: Late Cretaceous, 100.5–68 Ma

Extinct genus of dinosaurs

Atacamatitan (meaning "Atacama Desert titan") is a genus of titanosaurian sauropod dinosaurs from the Late Cretaceous Tolar Formation of Chile.

== Discovery and naming ==
In February 2000, with the purpose of looking for Mesozoic fossils in Chile, Chilean and Brazilian researchers mounted a preliminary expedition that was organized by the Chilean National Museum of Natural History and the National Museum of Brazil heading to Antofagasta Region. During the expedition, they discovered the deposits of the Tolar Formation, located about 150 km north of Calama town and 50 km east from El Abra copper mine.

The deposits of this formation consists of well-stratified, red succession of breccias, conglomerates and sandstones. In July 2001, a second expedition was organized and with this, the excavation of the formation. The results ended on the discovery of the holotype of Atacamatitan: SGO-PV-961. The fossil remains were found in an outcrop surface of 2 m^{2} near Conchi Viejo town, Atacama Desert in Antofagasta Region, and they were associated to a single individual. The geological age of this formation is uncertain, ranging from the Late Cretaceous to the Paleocene. However, the discovery of Atacamatitan seems to support a Cretaceous age. Atacamatitan was later named and described by Alexander et al. 2011, becoming one of the most complete titanosaurs known from Chile. The generic name, Atacamatitan, is in reference to the Atacama desert, were the remains were found, and the Greek word Τιτάν, meaning titan. The specific name, chilensis, refers to Chile. The holotype is currently housed at the Chilean National Museum of Natural History.

== Description ==
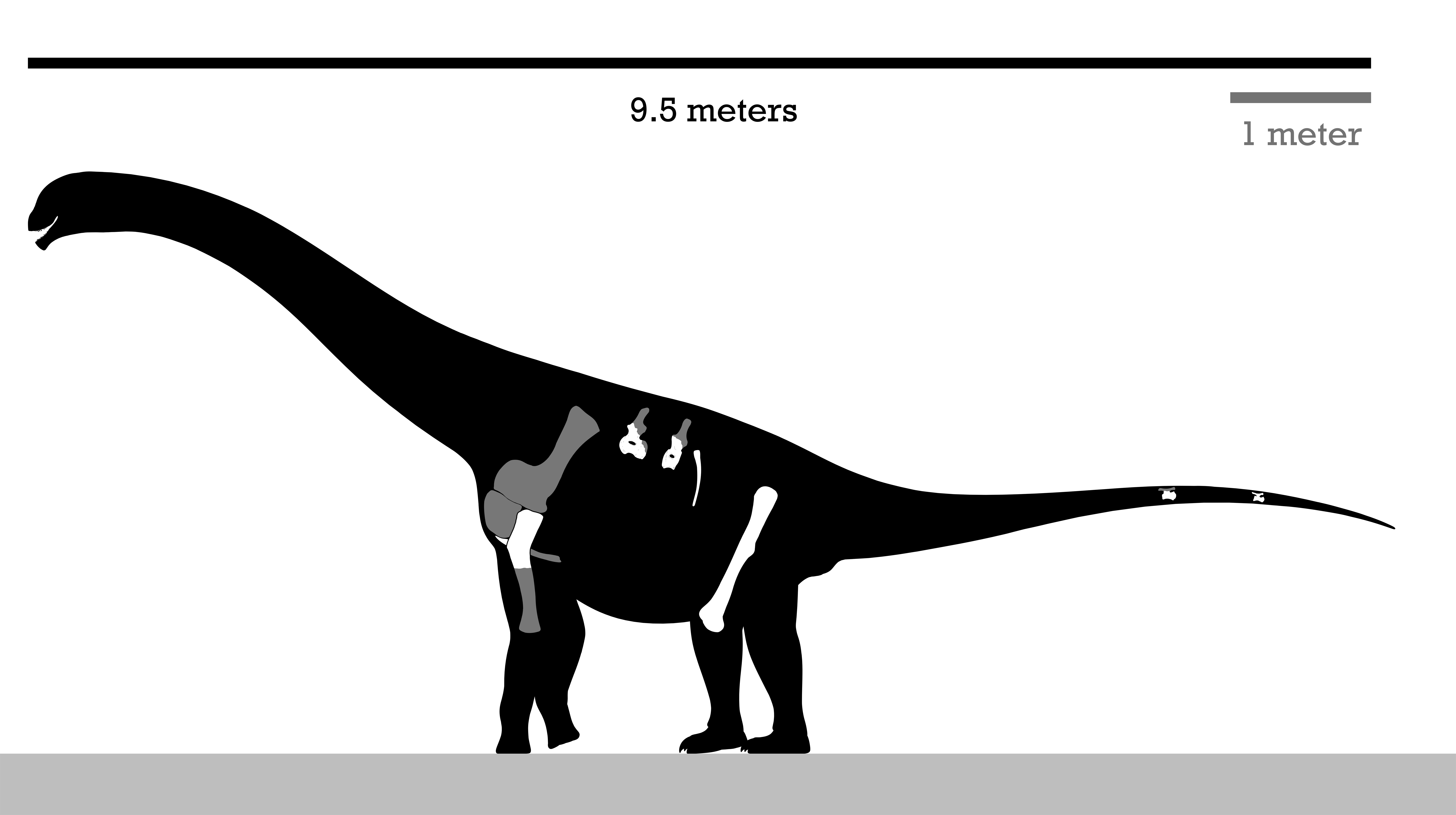
Skeletal diagram of the holotype

The holotype, SGO-PV-961, consists of a right femur, the proximal end of a humerus, two dorsal vertebrae, posterior caudal vertebrae, dorsal ribs and a possibly fragmentary element of the sternum, other fragmented caudal vertebrae and indeterminate bones. Most elements are slightly distorted, have a reddish coloration and are quite ponderous, due to extensive permineralization. Although the body estimates are quite uncertain, Thomas Holtz estimated its possible weight between 8 and 16 t (8,000.0 and 16,000.0 kg).

According to Kellner et al. 2011, Atacamatitan can be recognised in having dorsal centra with pleurocoels that are curved and do not point posteriorly, dorsal vertebrae with concave ventral surface, posterior caudal vertebrae with laterally compressed neural spine having a blade-like anterior margin, femur with the proximal end getting gradually reduced until two thirds of its total length.

=== Vertebrae ===
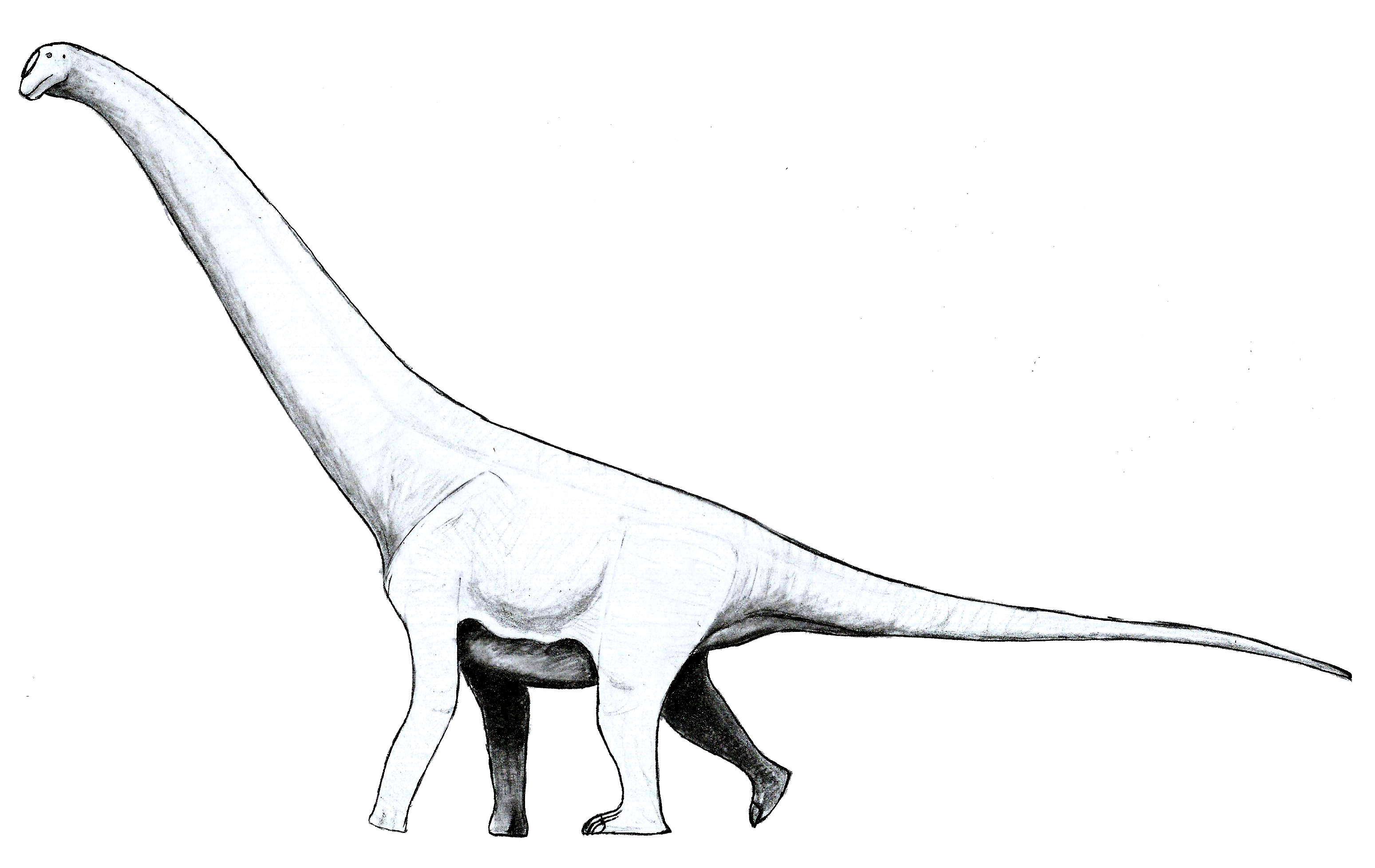
Life restoration

The two preserved dorsal vertebrae are fragmented, with partial neural arches. Both vertebrae are opisthocoelic. Dorsal vertebra SGO-PV-961a features an elongated centrum, with pleurocoels in the lateral sides that are rounded and less elongated compared to other titanosaurs. The neural arch is missing, and due to the preserverd dimensions, it is likely that it was wider than high. The second dorsal vertebra SGO-PV-961b is antero-posteriorly compressed with the neural arch partially preserved. These dorsal vertebrae differ from other titanosaurs such as Gondwanatitan, Saltasaurus, Trigonosaurus and Uberabatitan, due to the strongly concave ventral margin of the centrum. By taking into account all the characteristics of the dorsal vertebrae, Atacamatitan differs from other titanosaurs by having pleurocoels rounded and less elongated not pointing posteriorly.

Although some caudal vertebrae were discovered, only two are well preserved. Both vertebrae came from the middle and posterior end of the tail. Caudal vertebra SGO-PV-961c was preserved only the centrum, it is dorsoventrally compressed and lacking pleurocoels. The centrum preserve two processes to attach chevrons, and the ventral and lateral surfaces are curved. Second caudal vertebra SGO-PV-961h is nearly complete, only lacking right prezygapophysis. The centrum is similar to SGO-PV-961c, only being smaller and posteriorly oriented. The prezygapophyses are elongated and reach nearly 30% of the anterior centrum. Postzygapophyses are reduced and positioned at the ventral margin of the neural spine. The neural arch is preserved in the anterior half of the centrum.

=== Forelimb and hindlimb ===
Ribs were unearthed too, the most complete is SGO-PV-961d, though it is unknown if the ribs of Atacamatitan had pneumatic foramina as evidenced in other titanosaurs. It is anteroposteriorly compressed with the dorsoventral diameter longer than the anteroposterior one. Capitulum and tuberculum are fragmented. The fragmentary sternal plate is thin and has a smooth border; due to its fragmentary nature, it is unclear the form. The right humerus is very fragmented, only preserving the proximal end and although the distal expansion is missing, it has a notable reduced distal end. Anteriorly, it preserves a developed depression for muscular attachment.

The preserved right femur is more gracile compared to other elements, indicating that the animal had stronger forelimbs. This is seen as a possible and potential autapomorphy for this species. It measures 1.10 m (110 cm), the femoral head is missing and posteriorly, it preserves a well developed fourth trochanter, extending to the proximal quarter.

== Classification ==
In the original description, Atacamatitan was placed in the Titanosauridae. However given the fragmentary nature of the holotype, most cladistic analysis exclude Atacamatitan. Nevertheless, in 2012, Rubilar-Rogers and Gutstein conducted a preliminary cladistic analysis which ended in a polytomy within Nemegtosaurus, Rapetosaurus, Titanosaurus and the Saltasauridae. Atacamatitan was placed within the Lithostrotia.

== See also ==
- 2011 in paleontology
- Titanosauria
- Geology of Chile
- Alexander Kellner
