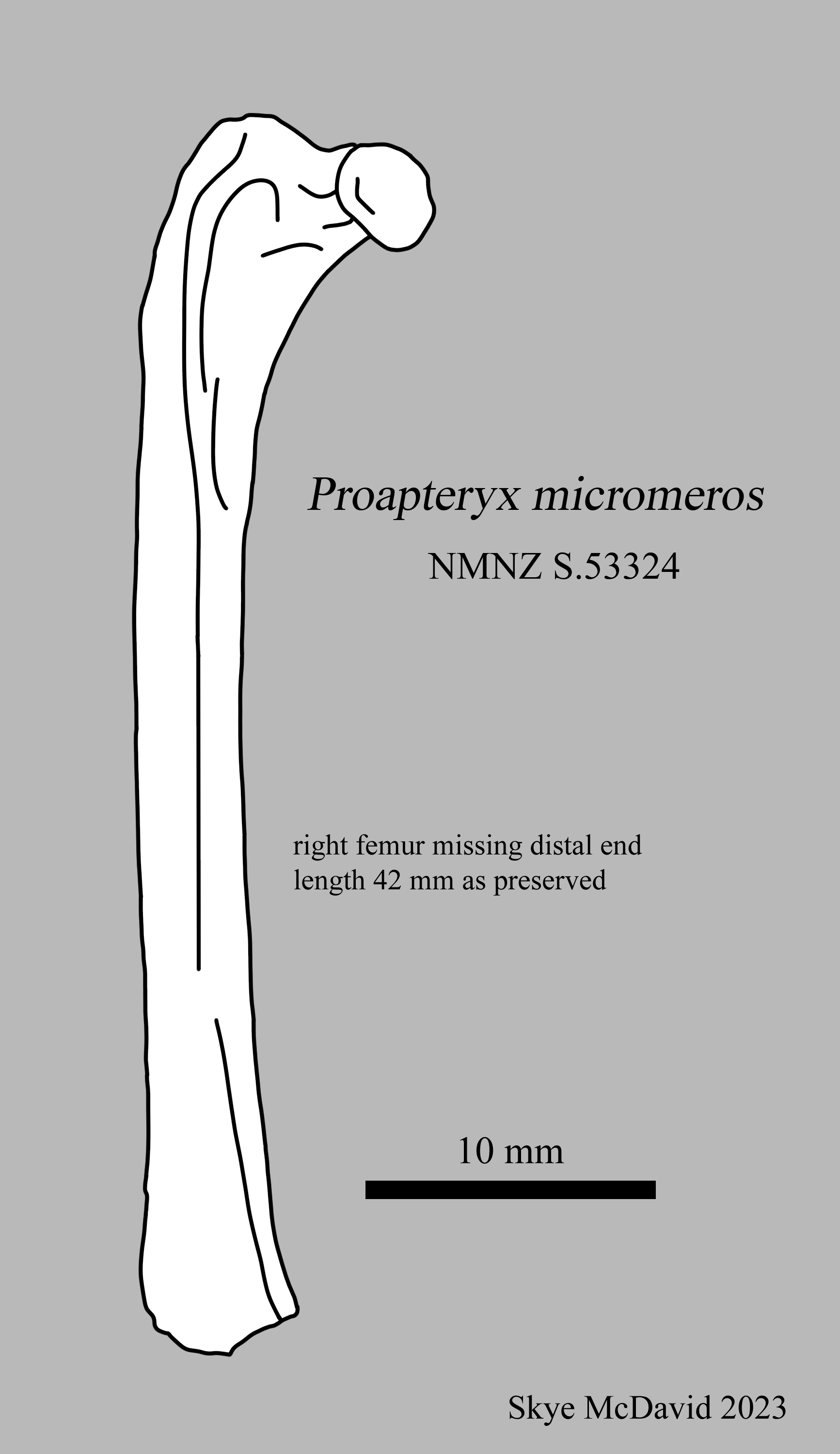
- Illustration of holotype femur

Scientific classification
- Kingdom: Animalia
- Phylum: Chordata
- Class: Aves
- Infraclass: Palaeognathae
- Order: Apterygiformes
- Family: Apterygidae
- Genus: †Proapteryx; Worthy et al. 2013

Species
- †Proapteryx micromeros Worthy et al. 2013

= Proapteryx =

Proapteryx Temporal range: early Miocene 19–16 Ma

Extinct genus of birds

Proapteryx micromeros is an extinct kiwi known from the 16–19 million-year-old early Miocene sediments of the St Bathans Fauna of Otago, New Zealand.

== Features ==
P. micromeros is considerably smaller than modern kiwi, weighing around 234.1 – 377g (the smallest living kiwi, Apteryx owenii, weighs at least 800 g), and its more gracile otic process may indicate a shorter bill. It bears distinctively slender hindlimbs, more comparable in terms of proportion to flying birds like the banded rail than to extant kiwi, and it is speculated to have been capable of powered flight, or to have evolved relatively recently from flying ancestors.

== Importance ==
The fact that Proapteryx lacked specialisation for a terrestrial, flightless lifestyle supports the hypothesis that kiwi ancestors flew to New Zealand from Australia in the Miocene, well after moas had developed their modern forms – moa remains are also known from Saint Bathans, already large and flightless. This supports genetic and morphological analyses indicating that the two clades arrived in New Zealand independently and are not particularly closely related, moas forming a clade with tinamous, and kiwi with Australian ratites, the cassowary and emu.

Kiwi have also been found by molecular studies to be the sister taxa of the elephant birds of Madagascar. Proapteryx establishes the existence of flying Australian palaeognaths as recently as the early Miocene, indicating that the Malagasy ratites may have flown across the Indian Ocean around this time.
