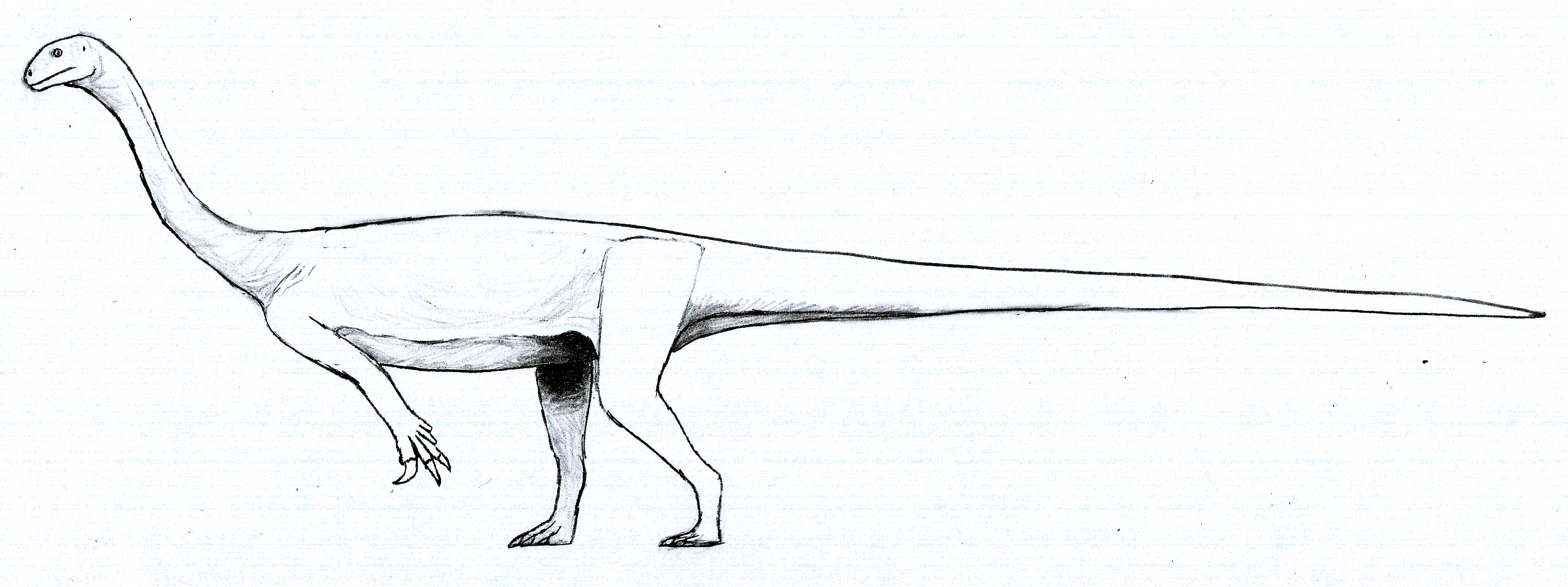
- Arcusaurus reconstruction

Scientific classification
- Kingdom: Animalia
- Phylum: Chordata
- Class: Reptilia
- Clade: Dinosauria
- Clade: Saurischia
- Clade: †Sauropodomorpha
- Clade: †Bagualosauria
- Genus: †Arcusaurus; Yates et al., 2011

Species
- †A. pereirabdalorum Yates et al., 2011 (type)

= Arcusaurus =

Arcusaurus Temporal range: Early Jurassic, Pliensbachian

Extinct genus of dinosaur from early Jurassic South Africa

Arcusaurus is an extinct genus of sauropodomorph dinosaur from the Early Jurassic (Pliensbachian stage) of South Africa. Arcusaurus was first named by Adam Yates, Matthew Bonnan and Johann Neveling in 2011 and the type species is Arcusaurus pereirabdalorum. The generic name is derived from Latin arcus, "rainbow", a reference to the Rainbow Nation. The specific epithet honours Lucille Pereira and Fernando Abdala who discovered the fossils.

A phylogenetic study of Arcusaurus found it to be a basal sauropodomorph, placing it as the sister taxon of Efraasia and all of the more derived sauropodomorphs. Since Efraasia is known from the Norian stage of the Late Triassic, the close relationship with Arcusaurus implies that there was a 35-million-year ghost lineage of sauropodomorphs stretching from Late Triassic forms to Arcusaurus. However, Arcusaurus possesses many features unique to more advanced groups included in the clade Plateosauria, raising doubts about the results of the phylogenetic analysis.

== Discovery ==
Arcusaurus is known from remains collected in March 2006 at the Spion Kop Heelbo site from the upper Elliot Formation in Senekal in Free State. This site might be Pliensbachian in age. The holotype (specimen number BP/1/6235) consists of a partial skull. In the area 50 cm around this skull, a number of additional bones were discovered – these were of comparable size to the bones of the skull, and overlapping material confirms that they belong to the same species. However, two right nasal (skull bone located behind the nostril) were discovered, indicating that at least two individuals must have been present; since specimens should only encompass elements that can be assigned to a single individual, each recovered bone apart from the holotype was given its separate specimen number.

The holotype was found disarticulated (not in their original anatomical compound), as is the case for all other bones, and includes the nasal; the postorbital, a bone behind the eye socket; and the dentary, the tooth bearing bone of the lower jaw; and the coronoid, a bone of the lower jaw behind the dentary; as well as teeth of the maxilla (upper jaw bone). A single caudal (tail) vertebra might also belong to this individual. The other specimens include, besides the second right nasal, another dentary; a premaxilla, the frontmost bone of the upper jaw; a laterosphenoid, a bone that formed part of the roof of the braincase; several phalanges and unguals (toe and claw bones); an humerus (upper arm bone); and fragments of the sacrum and ilium (bones of the hip region). The present individuals probably represented juveniles as indicated by small size and open bone sutures. From detailed features the describers concluded these were not juveniles of either Aardonyx or Massospondylus.

== Description ==
=== Skull ===
The snout was probably relatively deep as in plateosaurians, which is indicated by the square shape of the premaxilla, which formed the tip of the snout. The external naris, the opening for the nostril, was located close to the tip of the snout, and the orbit (eye socket) was proportionally large and circular, similar to that of the early dinosaur Eoraptor.

The premaxilla contained four teeth on each side. The interdental plates, triangular bony projections between the teeth, were higher than wide, in contrast to many other early saurischian dinosaurs. Two bony shelfes projected from the inner side of the premaxilla, one above the other. The lower shelfs of the left and right premaxilla contacted each other in the middle, forming the front part of the palate; this palate is penetrated by a large elliptical opening. The upper shelf is less extensive, without contact between the left and right halves. Both the lower shelf and upper shelf are unique features serving to distinguish the genus from related sauropodomorphs.

The nasal bone was plate-like and had four processes (bony extensions), two directed to the front and two to the rear. The two frontwards directed processes together formed the rear half of the opening for the nostril. The lower of these processes was tongue-shaped, rather than triangular as in most related genera, and was wider than the upper process, unlike in plateosaurians. Of the two processes that were directed rearwards, the upper (and inner) one was broad and flat, and would have connected to the frontal bone behind, probably forming a straight suture between both bones. The lower (and outer) of these processes extended onto the lacrimal bone, which formed the front margin of the orbit (opening for the eye). Just in front of this process, on the outer margin of the nasal, was a small hook-like process. When viewed from above, the left and right nasal are penetrated by a single large elliptical opening at the skull midline; such an opening was also present in Melanorosaurus.

The postorbital formed the upper rear corner of the orbit, and had three large processes, extending toward the front, bottom, and rear, respectively. The frontwards process was as long as the downwards facing process, and, when viewed from above, was straight and not curved inwards as typical for sauropodomorphs. A fourth, smaller process was directed upwards and inwards, and would have articulated with the parietal, the rearmost bone of the skull roof; the orientation of this process in unique in dinosaurs. The third process, projecting towards the rear, was not tapering towards its tip, unlike in most other basal sauropodomorphs; instead, its tip was bifurcated.
