= Tolar Formation =

Geologic formation in Chile

- Stratigraphic range: 100.5–65.5 Ma
- Type: Geological formation
- Underlies: Arca Formation
- Thickness: Up to 1 km (0.62 mi)

Lithology
- Primary: Breccia, conglomerate and sandstone

Location
- Coordinates: 21.9541°S 68.7259°W
- Country: Chile
- Extent: Conchi Viejo, Atacama Desert

Type section
- Named by: Victor Maksaev
- Year defined: 1978

The Tolar Formation is a Late Cretaceous to Paleocene-aged geological formation located in Chile.

Dinosaur remains are among the known fossils recovered from this formation.

== History ==
The Tolar Formation was first defined by Maksaev (1978).

In February 2000, with the purpose of looking for Mesozoic fossils in Chile, Chilean and Brazilian researchers mounted a preliminary expedition that was organized by the Chilean National Museum of Natural History and the National Museum of Brazil heading to Antofagasta Region. During the expedition, they discovered the deposits of the Tolar Formation, located about 150 km north of Calama town and 50 km east from El Abra copper mine.

In July 2001, a second expedition was organized and with this, the Tolar Formation was excavated and the holotype of Atacamatitan chilensis and indeterminate dinosaur remains were also discovered.

== Age of the formation ==
The exact age of the Tolar Formation is unknown, but it is likely that the Tolar Formation is of Late Cretaceous and Paleocene age, although it has since been suggested that the Tolar Formation may have been exclusively Late Cretaceous in age due to the presence of non-avian dinosaur fossils. Marinovic & Lahsen (1984) suggested the age of the Tolar Formation to be 100.5-68 Ma or 100.5-65.5 Ma, based on the age of the underlying Arca Formation.

It has also been assumed that the Tolar Formation may have instead been laid down around 109 Ma, during the Albian of the Early Cretaceous.

== Fossil content ==
| Color key: Taxon / Reclassified taxon / Taxon falsely reported as present / Dubious taxon or junior synonym / Ichnotaxon / Ootaxon / Morphotaxon | Notes; Uncertain or tentative taxa are in small text; ~~crossed out~~ taxa are discredited. |

=== Dinosaurs ===
==== Sauropods ====
Sauropods of the Tolar Formation
| Genus | Species | Location | Stratigraphic position | Material | Notes | Images |
|---|---|---|---|---|---|---|
| Atacamatitan | A. chilensis | Antofagasta Region, Chile | Albian to Maastrichtian | Femur, Humerus, 2 Dorsal Vertebrae, Caudal Vertebrae, Dorsal Ribs and possibly Sternum | A lithostrotian titanosaur | |
