= St Bathans fauna =

Fossil deposit from the Early Miocene period in Central Otago, New Zealand

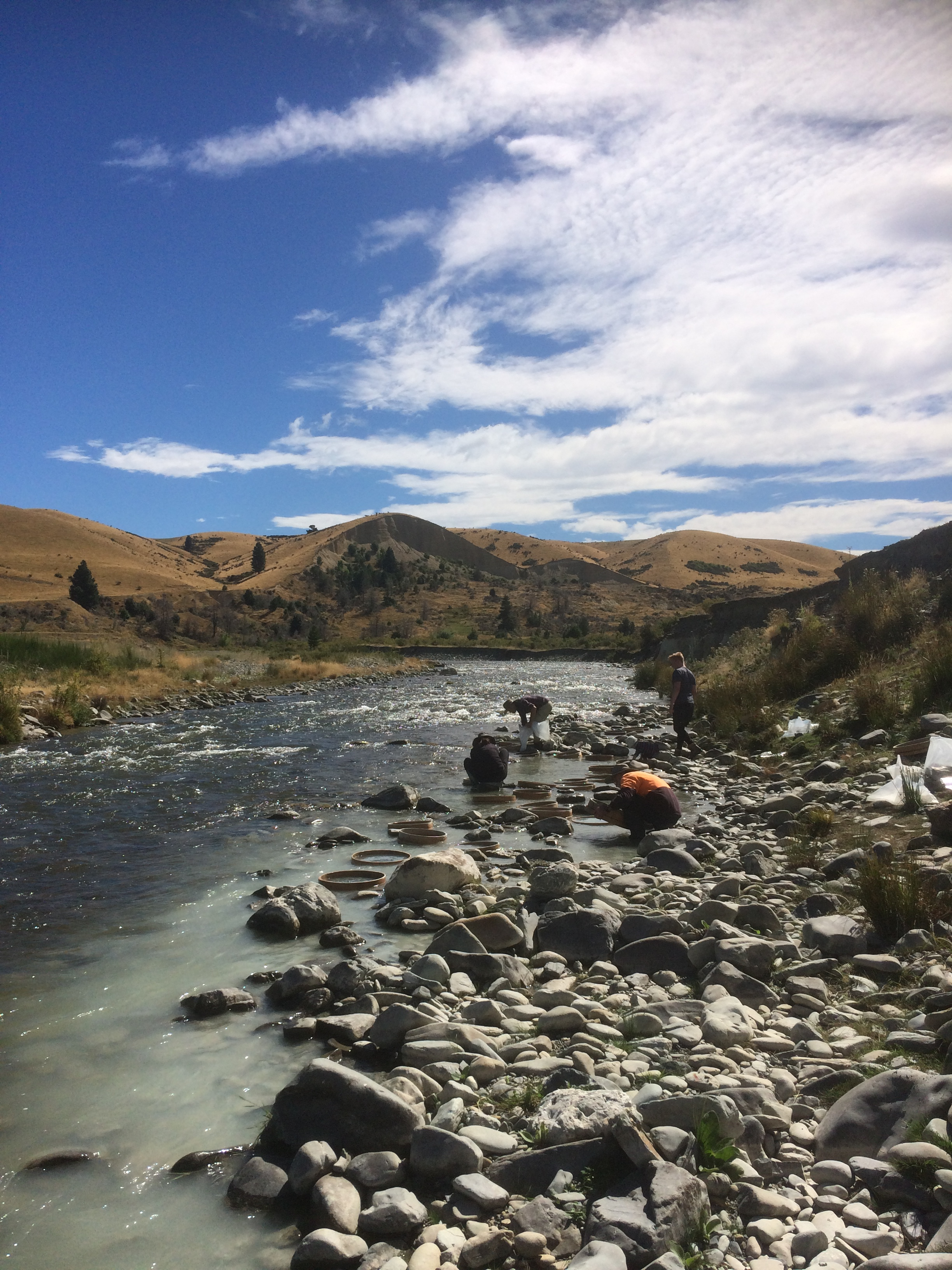
Palaeontologists sieving St Bathans fossils in the Manuherikia River

The St Bathans fauna is found in the lower Bannockburn Formation of the Manuherikia Group of Central Otago, in the South Island of New Zealand. It comprises a suite of fossilised prehistoric animals from the late Early Miocene (Altonian) period, with an age range of 19–16 million years ago.

The layer in which the fossils are found derives from littoral zone sediments deposited in a shallow, freshwater lake, with an area of 5600 km^{2} from present day Central Otago to Bannockburn and the Nevis Valley in the west; to Naseby in the east; and from the Waitaki Valley in the north to Ranfurly in the south. The lake was bordered by an extensive floodplain containing herbaceous and grassy wetland habitats with peat-forming swamp–woodland. At that time the climate was warm with a distinctly subtropical Australian climate and the surrounding vegetation was characterised by casuarinas, eucalypts and palms as well as podocarps, araucarias and southern beeches.

The fossiliferous layer has been exposed at places along the Manuherikia River and at other sites in the vicinity of the historic gold mining town of St Bathans. The fauna consists of a variety of vertebrates, including fish, a crocodilian, a rhynchocephalian (a relative of tuatara), geckos, skinks, a primitive mammal, several species of bats, and several kinds of birds, especially waterbirds. Of tree-dwelling birds, parrots outnumber pigeons thirty to one. Proapteryx, a basal form of kiwi, is known from there. The Miocene ecosystem was recovering from the 'Oligocene drowning' a few million years earlier, when up to 80% of the current land area of New Zealand was submerged. The wildlife that lived in, on, and around the palaeolake Manuherikia was uniquely New Zealand, which strongly suggesting that some emergent land remained during this near drowning event. Marked global cooling and drying during the Miocene, Pliocene and the Pleistocene Ice Ages resulted in the extinction of the 'subtropical' elements of the St Bathans fauna. Those that survived adapted to the dynamic geological and climatic changes, and would form part of the enigmatic fauna that characterised New Zealand when humans arrived in the late 13th century.

== History of excavation ==
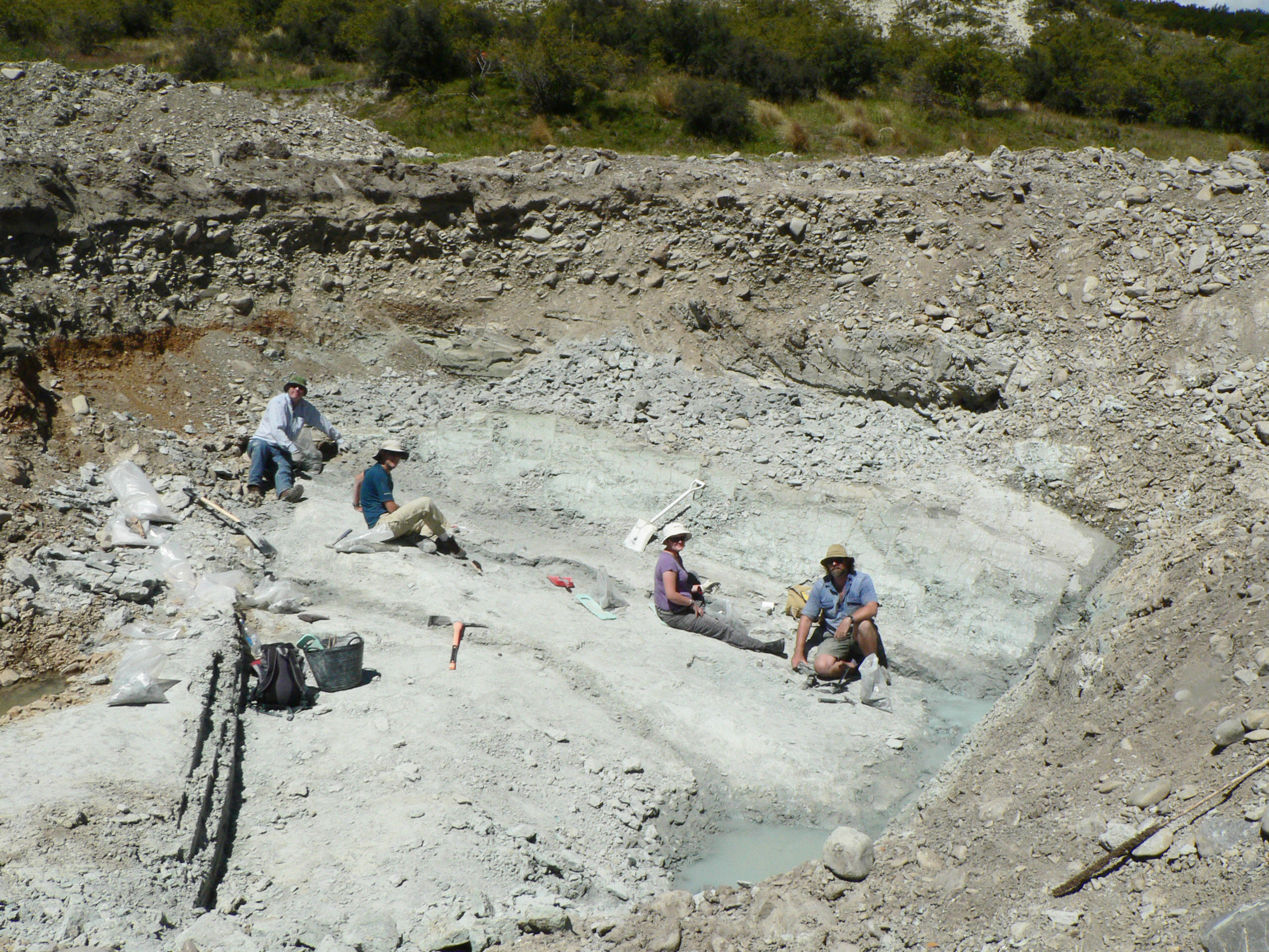
Quarrying bed HH1a, Bannockburn Formation, for the early Miocene St Bathans Fauna

The current research programme on St Bathans vertebrates was initiated by Trevor Worthy, a New Zealander now based in Flinders University, Adelaide, Alan Tennyson from the Museum of New Zealand Te Papa Tongarewa and Craig Jones in 2000. Other key scientists involved include Jenny Worthy from Flinders University, Paul Scofield and Vanesa De Pietri from Canterbury Museum, and Nicolas J. Rawlence from Otago University, Dunedin. In 2016 Vanesa De Pietri was awarded a Royal Society of New Zealand Marsden Fast Start grant to study the shorebird fossils. This long-running research programme also includes scientists from the University of New South Wales in Sydney and from the University of Queensland in Brisbane.

== Mammals ==
Surprisingly, given modern New Zealand's dearth of land mammals, there is a basal theriiform mammal, the St Bathans mammal. Several species of mystacine bats are also known, as well as a vesper bat and several incertae sedis species. This bat fauna included Vulcanops, a giant burrowing bat three times the size of today's relatives. This suggests that small land mammals were a common component of New Zealand's fauna in the Miocene, with even bats being significantly more diverse than today.

== Birds ==
New Zealand's two modern palaeognath clades, the kiwi and moa, have early representatives in the fauna. The former is represented by the diminutive, possibly volant Proapteryx. The latter is represented by several bones and egg shells of currently unnamed species, but already identifiable as true moa, being large sized and flightless. The fact that moa are already recognisably modern in anatomy, and possibly ecology, while kiwis are fairly unspecialised and probably still flighted, confirms the previous suspicions that neither clade is closely related and that they arrived in New Zealand independently: moa arrived and became flightless earlier in the Cenozoic, while kiwi were then recent arrivals.

Anseriforms (waterfowl) dominate the fauna. Ten species are recognised from St Bathans, making it the richest waterfowl fauna in the world. All the waterfowl species are unique to New Zealand. Stiff-tailed ducks dominate the fauna with Manuherikia lacustrina, M. minuta, M. douglasi, M. primadividua and Dunstanneta johnstoneorum. Two species of shelduck, Miotadorna, have been found and are common but remains of the two largest taxa (probable anserines) are rare. The dabbling duck Matanas enrightii remains poorly known as only a few fossils have been found.

Palaelodids are ancient relatives of flamingos. The new species from St Bathans (Palaelodus aotearoa) is smaller than, and morphologically distinct from, the Late Oligocene-Early Miocene Palaelodus wilsoni from Australia.

Two pigeon species have been described. Rupephaps is a large fruit pigeon, possibly related to the modern Hemiphaga species. The Zealandian dove Deliaphaps zealandiensis is similar to the Nicobar pigeon.

Several Gruiformes have been described. The St Bathans adzebill (Aptornis proasciarostratus) was only slightly smaller than its more recent descendants. There were two flightless rails: the common Priscaweka parvales and uncommon Litorallus livezeyi. Priscaweka parvales was no bigger than a sparrow.

Charadriiformes, including gulls, terns, noddies, snipes, dotterels, plovers, jacanas, oystercatchers, sheathbills and the plains-wanderer, are a large group of birds that are mostly found in marine or semi-marine environments. There are about 350 species, and they are mostly small to medium-sized. Two of these are known from St Bathans, the New Zealand lake-wanderer (Hakawai melvillei), a relative of the plains-wanderer, and Sansom's plover (Neilus sansomae), a plover-like bird of uncertain affinities but possibly related to sheathbills and the Magellanic plover.

Petrels are seabirds in the order Procellariiformes. This group includes albatrosses. Petrels today make up most of all species of seabird, and the order is the only order of birds to be entirely marine. One species of petrel is known from the St Bathans Fauna – a diving petrel in the same genus as modern diving petrels, the Miocene diving petrel (Pelecanoides miokuaka).

At least two herons are known: Pikaihao bartlei and Matuku otagoense. The former is a bittern, while the latter is a much larger species that appears to be basal within Ardeidae (the herons).

One eagle, similar in size to a wedge-tailed eagle, and another bird of prey, similar in size to a small hawk, have been found, but await formal description.

Two parrot genera are represented. Heracles is represented by its sole species, Heracles inexpectatus, the largest known parrot, weighing 7 kilograms and standing 1 meter tall. Nelepsittacus is represented by at least four species. These vary drastically in size, suggesting that they occupied a wide variety of ecological niches, having diversified in the relative absence of other parrots.

A New Zealand wren, Kuiornis indicator, is known from these deposits, possibly similar to the modern rifleman. A species of currawong, Miostrepera canora, reveals that the Cracticinae were previously native to Zealandia and indicates overwater dispersal.. A possible bowerbird (Ptilonorhynchidae) Aeviperditus gracilis has also been described from the deposits. Several other passerine species remain undescribed.

== Herpetofauna (amphibians and reptiles) ==
The St Bathans fauna is rich in reptile and amphibian remains. Several groups present in modern New Zealand are represented, such as leiopelmatid frogs, a sphenodontian similar to the modern tuatara, geckos, and skinks. However, there are also several species not seen in modern-day New Zealand, such as a mekosuchine crocodile up to 3 metres in length and pleurodire and meiolaniid turtles. This suggests that New Zealand's herpetofauna was much richer in this epoch, probably because its climate was considerably warmer than today.

== Fish ==
The vast majority of the bones excavated from St Bathans are those of freshwater fish such as the ancient relatives of today's bullies, galaxiids, and the extinct New Zealand grayling.

== Aquatic invertebrates ==
As well as fishes, shellfish, including freshwater mussels, and freshwater crayfish dominated the aquatic life in the palaeolake Manuherikia. A new species of St Bathans freshwater limpet, Latia manuherikia, was described by malacologist Bruce Marshall in 2011. This was both the first known fossil Latia and the first record of this genus from the South Island.

== Absent taxa ==
Notable examples of absent taxa include marsupials, snakes, agamid and varanid lizards, lungfish, eels, cockatoos, and all but one lineage (bellbirds and tūī) of the 80 species of Australian honeyeaters.
