= Luscinia jurcsaki =

Luscinia jurcsaki Temporal range: Middle Miocene

Scientific classification
- Kingdom: Animalia
- Phylum: Chordata
- Class: Aves
- Order: Passeriformes
- Family: Muscicapidae
- Genus: Luscinia
- Species: †L. jurcsaki

Binomial name
- †Luscinia jurcsaki Kessler & Venczel, 2011

Extinct species of bird

Luscinia jurcsaki is an extinct species of Luscinia that inhabited Romania during the Neogene period.
