= Gerry (company) =

American outdoor sports clothing and gear brand

- Industry: Outdoor gear
- Founded: 1946
- Founder: Gerald Cunningham
- Headquarters: Denver, Colorado
- Products: Backpacking equipment Outdoor sportswear Cold weather garments
- Website: gerryoutdoor.com

Gerry is a brand of outdoor sports clothing and gear, currently specializing in cold weather garments (clothes).

== History ==
The company was founded in 1946 in Ward, Colorado, by Gerald "Gerry" Cunningham, a veteran of the 10th Mountain Division. Initially it was a mail order business providing lightweight equipment for mountaineers.

In 1950, Cunningham developed the triangular carabiner, the first in the modern style. Less than five years later, he also invented the drawstring clamp also known as a cord clamp or cord lock.

In 1953, Gerry tents were used in the first successful Everest expedition.

In 1958, Gerry opened the first of its retail stores, in Boulder. In 1949 Cunningham invented the Gerry Kiddie Carrier which was frameless; the frame version was patented in 1963. The company Gerry Designs, Inc. was spun off with Meg Hansson in 1960 to market the carrier to a wider audience. Nearly a million babies were toted in the carriers.

In 1959, the company created a very compact survival suit for the US Air Force. The seven piece suit was made of nylon and goose down and came vacuum packed in a small box. It was used in jets and space capsules. The coat converted into a sleeping bag. Gerry expanded into outerwear and produced some of the first lightweight down jackets.

In 1963, the company supplied ultra lightweight gear for the first American ascent of Mount Everest. For the 1964 Winter Olympics the Olympic Committee wore Gerry ski coats.

In 1966, Gerry alumnus Dale Johnson founded Frostline Kits, a brand of sew-it-yourself outdoor products.

In 1971, Cunningham resigned from the company, saying it was "too big and no fun". In 1973 he was elected to the Sporting Goods Industry Hall of Fame. At that time Gerry was a division of Outdoor Sports Industries. Through 1980, the company offered a collection of innovative and brightly colored down garments, which sold well worldwide. But within a few years the company's products largely disappeared from the retail market.

Later, the Gerry brand was owned by the Amerex Group Inc., a New York–based privately owned clothing manufacturer which owned several brands. In 2002, Amerex created the Gerry website and announced a number of sponsorship programs.

Cunningham died May 15, 2010, at his home in Patagonia, Arizona (born February 17, 1922).

In 2010, the Gerry brand was bought by Studio Ray, of New York City which revamped the catalog, which included their classic outerwear and accessories. In Fall 2012, Gerry began to be sold at retailers, including Macy's, Dillard's, and The Sports Authority. Their lightweight jackets and other apparel are also sold seasonally in Costco stores. Gerry has its showroom in New York City.
