= Ardea sytchevskayae =

Ardea sytchevskayae Temporal range: Middle Miocene

Scientific classification
- Kingdom: Animalia
- Phylum: Chordata
- Class: Aves
- Order: Pelecaniformes
- Family: Ardeidae
- Genus: Ardea
- Species: †A. sytchevskayae

Binomial name
- †Ardea sytchevskayae Zelenkov, 2011

Extinct species of bird

Ardea sytchevskayae is an extinct species of Ardea that inhabited Mongolia during the Middle Miocene.
