= Gerald Cunningham (writer) =

Zealand author, photographer, historian and businessman

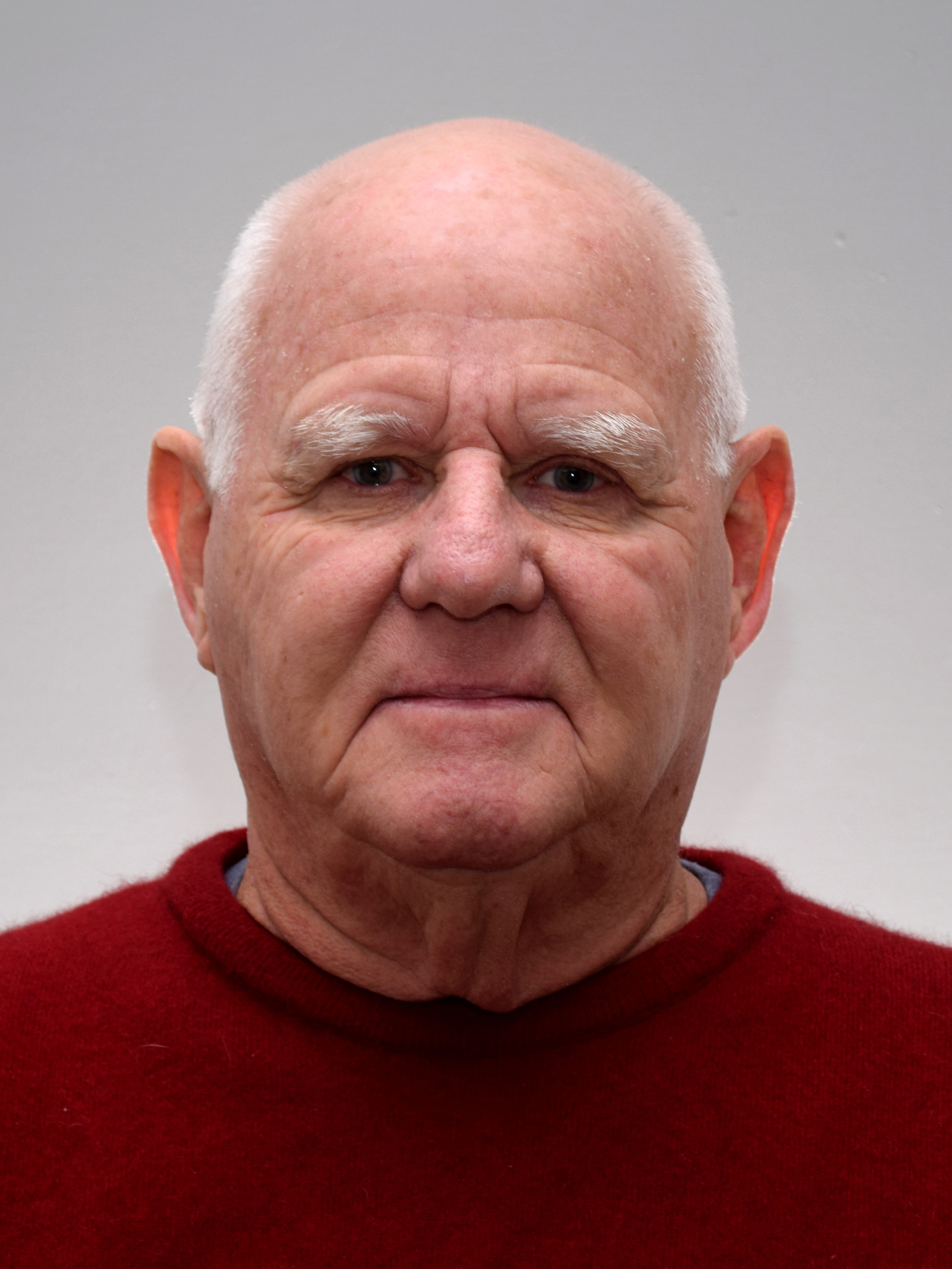
- Cunningham in 2019
- Born: Gerald Garrick Cunningham; 3 September 1945; Dunedin, New Zealand
- Died: 1 July 2019 (aged 73); Brisbane, Queensland, Australia
- Citizenship: New Zealand
- Occupations: Author, photographer, historian, businessman
- Writing career
- Period: 2003–2019

Gerald Garrick Cunningham (3 September 1945 – 1 July 2019) was a New Zealand author, photographer, historian and businessman.

== Biography ==
Born in Dunedin in the South Island of New Zealand, he lived in that city and in Central Otago, before moving to Auckland in 1957. Educated at Auckland Grammar School (1958–1962) he was employed by the Bank of New Zealand, Wright Stephenson & Co and Taylor Trading Company. In 1972 he established Company Forty Five Ltd., a business involved in the import, manufacture and wholesale of paintings and art prints to the retail trade throughout New Zealand. During 2001 he moved to the village of Lauder in Central Otago to retire.

After his retirement, Cunningham wrote four books published by Reed Publishing NZ Ltd., a New Zealand company that was taken over by Penguin NZ, an offshoot of the multinational publisher, Penguin Group, in 2009. A fifth book was published by Penguin NZ in 2009, with a sixth and seventh published by Bateman Publishing Ltd in 2011 & 2013.

Cunningham died on 1 July 2019 at the Royal Brisbane Hospital after suffering a massive stroke.

== Works ==
- Guide to the Otago Central Rail Trail Reed Publishing NZ Ltd, first published 2003, reprinted 2004, 2005, 2007 and republished by Penguin NZ in 2009. (ISBN 978 014 3202530)
- Guide to the Otago Goldfields Heritage Trail, Blue Lake (Otago), Reed Publishing NZ Ltd, 2004, republished by Penguin NZ in 2008 (ISBN 9780143009948)
- Illustrated History of Central Otago & the Queenstown Lakes District Skippers Canyon Reed Publishing NZ Ltd., 2005 (ISBN 0 7900 1023 2)
- Otago Central Rail Trail – A Pictorial Journey- Reed Publishing NZ Ltd., 2007 (ISBN 978 07900 1168 4)
- Central Otago – A Special Place- Penguin NZ, 2009, (ISBN 9780 143 0 11118)
- The Taieri Gorge Railway – Bateman Publishing Ltd, 2011 (ISBN 978 1 86953 815 6)
- Skippers & The Shotover River, Queenstown – Bateman Publishing Ltd, 2013 (ISBN 978 1 86953 846 0)
