= Robert Bollt =

American archaeologist (1971–2010)

Robert Bollt (26 August 1971 – 26 January 2010) was an American archaeologist, specializing in Pacific Archaeology.

== Education ==
Bollt received his Ph.D. from the University of Hawaiʻi in 2005.

== Work ==
Bollt spent much of his career studying the prehistory of the Austral Islands in French Polynesia. He published a monograph about his excavations on the island of Rurutu (Peva) and co-authored several journal articles on prehistoric fishing strategies and extirpated birds, bats and land mammals, on both Rurutu and Tubuai. At the time of his death he was analyzing material from the excavation he led in 2007 on the island of Tubuai at the Atiahara site, a remarkable Archaic East Polynesian occupation.

Bollt was a professor at the University of Hawaii Manoa from 2005 to early 2007. He taught a range of classes in the anthropology department including lithic analysis, lab analysis, Hawaiian archaeology and Anthropology 101.
