= List of amphibians =

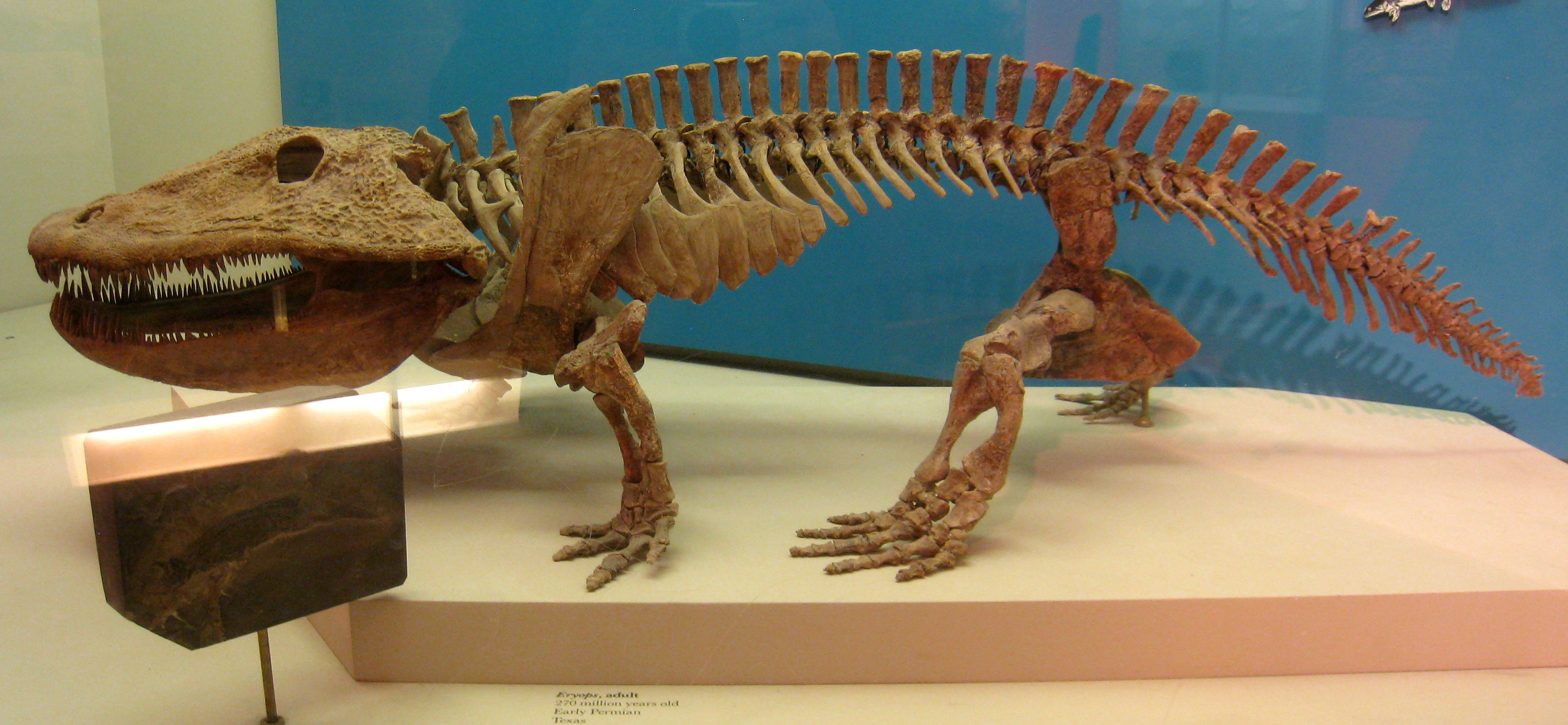
The temnospondyl Eryops had sturdy limbs to support its body on land

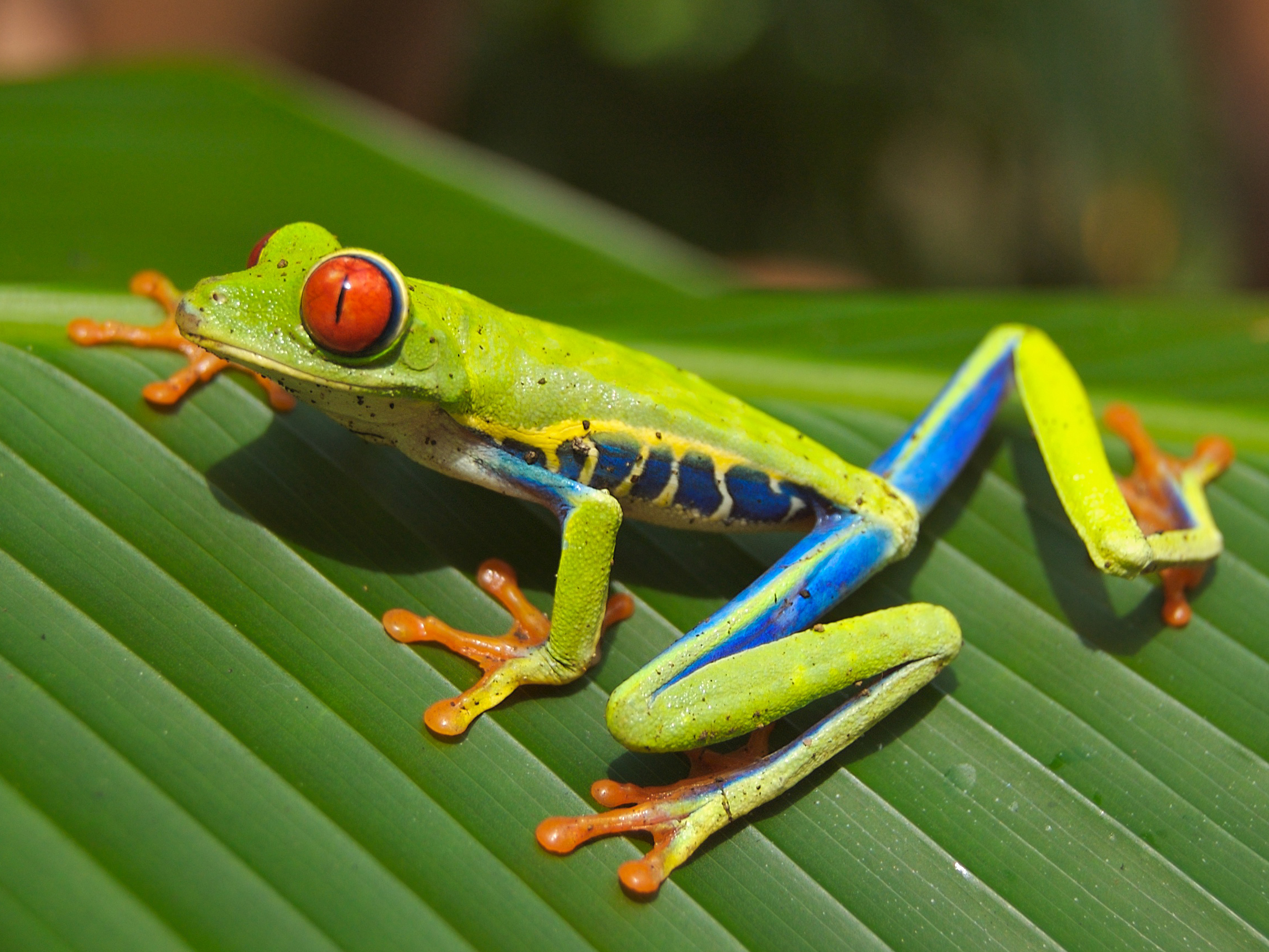
Red-eyed tree frog (Agalychnis callidryas) with limbs and feet specialised for climbing

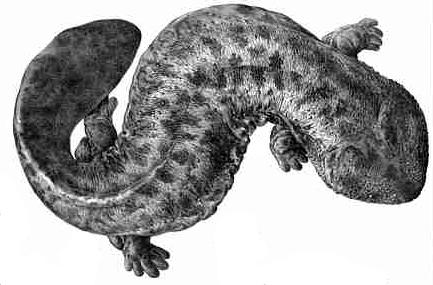
Japanese giant salamander (Andrias japonicus), a primitive salamander

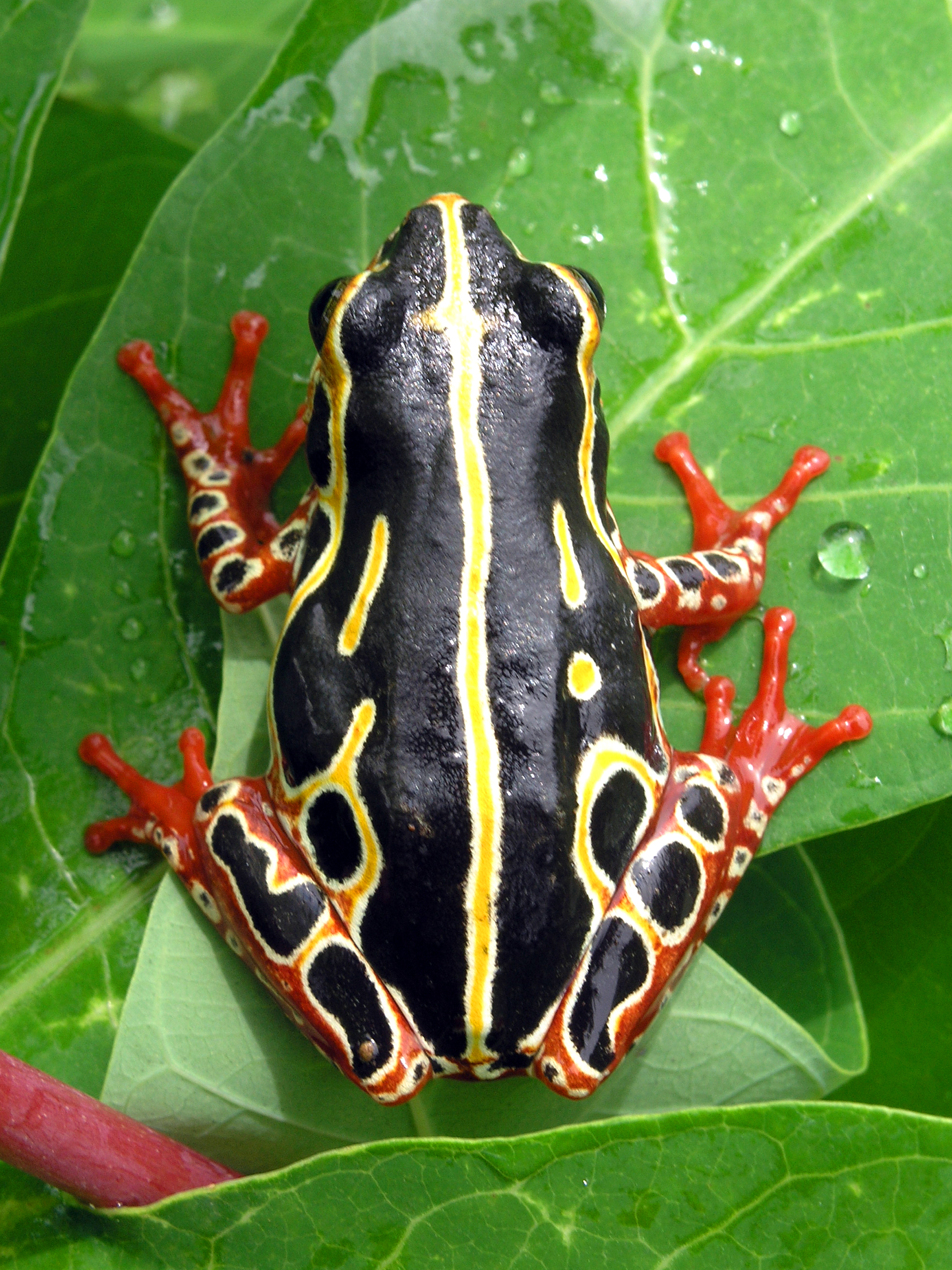
The bright colours of the common reed frog (Hyperolius viridiflavus) are typical of a toxic species

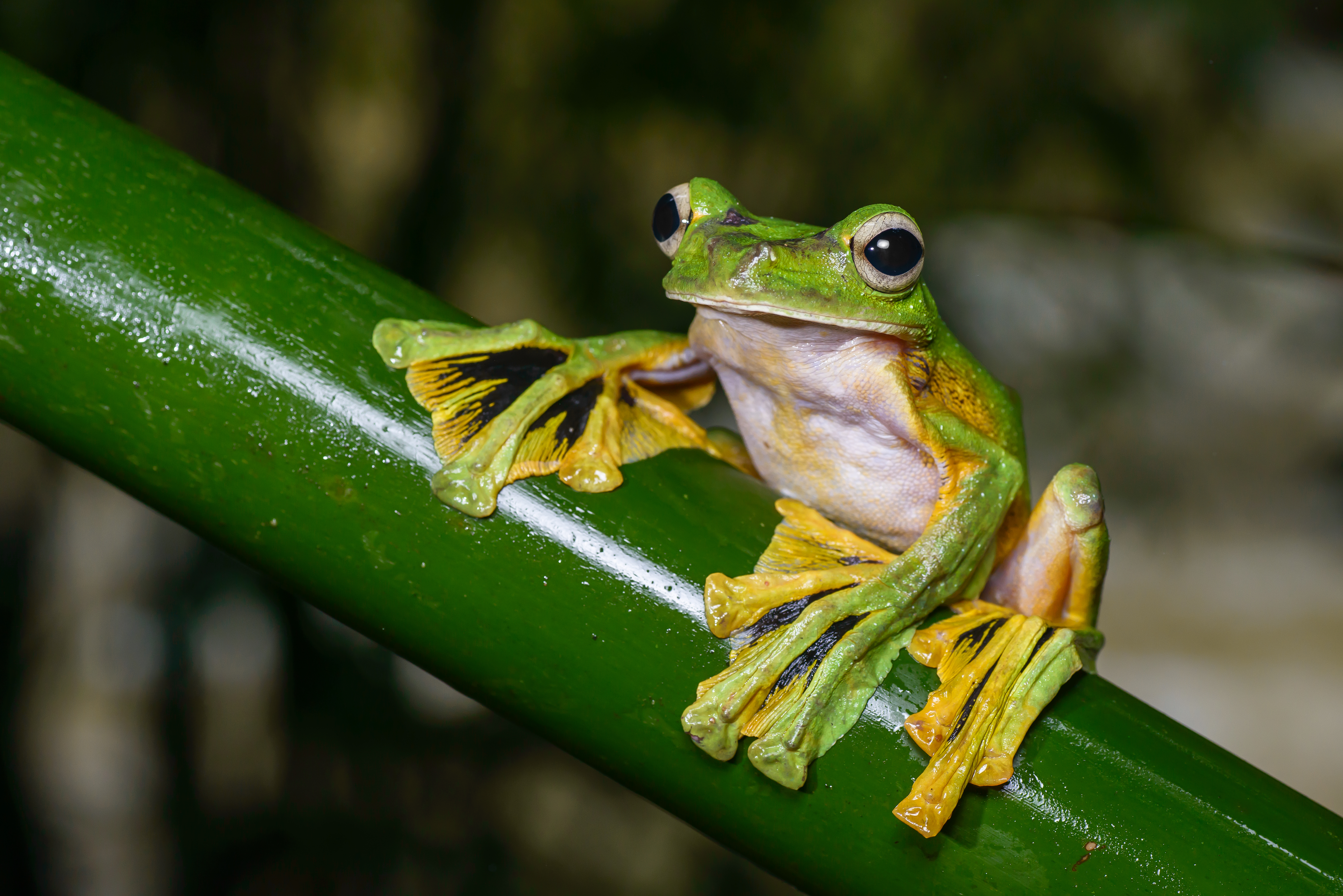
Wallace's flying frog (Rhacophorus nigropalmatus) can parachute to the forest floor from high in the trees.

Amphibians are ectothermic, tetrapod vertebrates of the class Amphibia. All living amphibians belong to the group Lissamphibia. They inhabit a wide variety of habitats, with most species living within terrestrial, fossorial, arboreal or freshwater aquatic ecosystems. Thus amphibians typically start out as larvae living in water, but some species have developed behavioural adaptations to bypass this.

A list of amphibians organizes the class of amphibian by family and subfamilies and mentions the number of species in each of them.

The list below largely follows Darrel Frost's Amphibian Species of the World (ASW), Version 5.5 (31 January 2011). Another classification, which largely follows Frost, but deviates from it in part is the one of AmphibiaWeb, which is run by the California Academy of Sciences and several of universities. The major differences between these two classifications are:

- Frost's ASW has split several families from other families (i.e. elevated to distinct families), whereas AmphibiaWeb has not (i.e., keeping them within the original families as subfamilies):
  - From Dendrobatidae: Aromobatidae
  - From Myobatrachidae: Limnodynastidae
  - From Ranidae: Ceratobatrachidae, Dicroglossidae, Mantellidae, Micrixalidae, Nyctibatrachidae, Petropedetidae, Phrynobatrachidae, Ptychadenidae, Pyxicephalidae, Ranixalidae, Rhacophoridae
- AmphibiaWeb has also split a few families off from other families (i.e. elevated to distinct families), where Frost's ASW has not (i.e., keeping them within the original families):
  - From Alytidae: Discoglossidae
  - From Leiopelmatidae: Ascaphidae
  - From Ambystomatidae: Dicamptodontidae
  - From Caeciliidae: Scolecomorphidae, Typhlonectidae
  - From Ichthyophiidae: Uraeotyphlidae

== Class Amphibia ==
There are a total of 8216 amphibian species in three orders.

=== Order Anura: frogs and toads ===
As of 29 August 2020, 7243 species of frogs and toads are recognised by Amphibian Species of the World.

==== Suborder Archaeobatrachia ====
- Family Alytidae – painted frogs or disc-tongued frogs, 12 species. Includes the genus Discoglossus (5 species) which is sometimes considered a distinct family, Discoglossidae.
- Family Bombinatoridae – firebelly toads, 8 species
- Family Leiopelmatidae – New Zealand primitive frogs, 3 species in genus Leiopelma.
- Family Ascaphidae – tailed frogs. Two species in genus Ascaphus. Sometimes considered part of family Leiopelmatidae.

==== Suborder Mesobatrachia ====
- Family Megophryidae – litter frogs or short legged toads, 268 species
  - Subfamily Megophryinae – Asian spadefoot toads, 106 species
- Family Pelobatidae – European spadefoot toads, 6 species
- Family Pelodytidae – parsley frogs, 5 species
- Family Pipidae – tongueless frogs, 41 species
- Family Rhinophrynidae – Mexican burrowing toad, 1 species
- Family Scaphiopodidae – American spadefoot toads, 7 species

==== Suborder Neobatrachia ====
- Family Allophrynidae – Tukeit Hill frogs, 3 species
- Family Alsodidae – 30 species
- Family Arthroleptidae – screeching frogs or squeakers, 149 species
  - Subfamily Arthroleptinae – 67 species
  - Subfamily Astylosterninae – 30 species
  - Subfamily Leptopelinae – 52 species
- Family: Batrachylidae, 12 species
- Superfamily Brachycephaloidea – 1170 species
  - Family Brachycephalidae – saddleback toads, 74 species
  - Family Craugastoridae – 865 species
  - Subfamily Ceuthomantinae – 573 species; includes species formerly in subfamily Strabomantinae
  - Subfamily Craugastorinae – 139 species
  - Subfamily Holoadeninae – 153 species
  - Family Eleutherodactylidae – 201 species
    - Subfamily Eleutherodactylinae – 217 species
    - Subfamily Phyzelaphryninae – 12 species
- Family Brevicipitidae – 36 species
- Family Bufonidae – true toads, 627 species
- Family Calyptocephalellidae – 5 species
- Family Centrolenidae – glass frogs, 156 species
  - Subfamily: Centroleninae – 119 species
  - Subfamily: Hyalinobatrachiinae – 35 species
- Family Ceratobatrachidae – 102 species
  - Subfamily Alcalinae – 5 species
  - Subfamily Ceratobatrachinae – 90 species
  - Subfamily Liuraninae – 7 species
- Family Ceratophryidae – 12 species, formerly contained Batrachylidae and Telmatobiidae as subfamilies
- Family Conrauidae – 6 species
- Family Cycloramphidae – 36 species, formerly contained Alsodidae as subfamily
- Superfamily Dendrobatoidea – 328 species
  - Family Aromobatidae – 128 species, considered a subfamily of Dendrobatidae by AmphibiaWeb
    - Subfamily Allobatinae – 55 species
    - Subfamily Anomaloglossinae – 34 species
    - Subfamily Aromobatinae – 38 species
  - Family Dendrobatidae – poison dart frogs, 200 species
    - Subfamily Colostethinae, 66 species
    - Subfamily Dendrobatinae, 61 species
    - Subfamily Hyloxalinae, 72 species
- Family Dicroglossidae – 212 species
  - Subfamily Dicroglossinae – 197 species
  - Subfamily Occidozyginae – 15 species
- Family Heleophrynidae – ghost frogs, 7 species
- Family Hemiphractidae – 118 species
  - Subfamily Cryptobatrachinae – 8 species
  - Subfamily Hemiphractinae – 110 species
- Family Hemisotidae – shovelnose frogs, 9 species
- Family Hylidae – tree frogs, 1036 species
  - Subfamily Hylinae – 747 species
  - Subfamily Pelodryadinae – 222 species
  - Subfamily Phyllomedusinae – 67 species
- Family Hylodidae – 47 species
- Family Hyperoliidae – sedge frogs or bush frogs, 228 species
  - Subfamily Hyperoliinae – 203 species
  - Subfamily Kassininae – 25 species
- Family Leiopelmatidae – 3 species; formerly part of Ascaphidae
- Family Leiuperidae – 86 species
- Family Leptodactylidae – southern frogs or tropical frogs, 219 species
  - Subfamily Leiuperinae – 101 species
  - Subfamily Leptodactylinae – 103 species
  - Subfamily Paratelmatobiinae – 14 species
- Family Mantellidae – 231 species, formerly considered part of the family Ranidae
  - Subfamily: Boophinae – 79 species
  - Subfamily: Laliostominae – 7 species
  - Subfamily: Mantellinae – 145 species
- Family Micrixalidae – 24 species, considered part of the family Ranidae by AmphibiaWeb
- Family Microhylidae – narrow-mouthed frogs, 698 species
  - Subfamily Adelastinae – 1 species
  - Subfamily Asterophryinae – 349 species
  - Subfamily Cophylinae – 113 species
  - Subfamily Dyscophinae – 3 species
  - Subfamily Gastrophryninae – 79 species
  - Subfamily Hoplophryninae – 3 species
  - Subfamily Kalophryninae – 26 species
  - Subfamily Melanobatrachinae – 1 species
  - Subfamily Microhylinae – 101 species
  - Subfamily Otophryninae – 6 species
  - Subfamily Phrynomerinae – 5 species
  - Subfamily Scaphiophryninae – 11 species
- Superfamily Myobatrachoidea – 132 species
  - Family Limnodynastidae, 43 species; considered a subfamily of Myobatrachidae by AmphibiaWeb
  - Family Myobatrachidae – Australian ground frogs, 85 species
- Family Nasikabatrachidae – 2 species; formerly included in family Sooglossidae
- Family Nyctibatrachidae – 39 species; formerly considered part of the family Ranidae
  - Subfamily Astrobatrachinae – 1 species
  - Subfamily Lankanectinae – 2 species
  - Subfamily Nyctibatrachinae – 36 species
- Family Odontobatrachidae – 5 species
- Family Odontophrynidae – 52 species
- Family Petropedetidae – 13 species; formerly considered part of Ranidae
- Family Phrynobatrachidae – 95 species; formerly considered part of Ranidae
- Family Ptychadenidae – 60 species, formerly considered part of Ranidae
- Family Pyxicephalidae – 85 species; formerly considered part of Ranidae
  - Subfamily Cacosterninae – 79 species
  - Subfamily Pyxicephalinae – 6 species
- Family Ranidae – true frogs, 409 species
- Family Ranixalidae – 18 species, formerly considered part of the family Ranidae
- Family Rhacophoridae – moss frogs, 430 species, formerly considered part of the family Ranidae
  - Subfamily Buergeriinae – 5 species
  - Subfamily Rhacophorinae – 425 species
- Family Sooglossidae Seychelles frogs, 4 species.
- Family Telmatobiidae – 63 species

=== Order Caudata: Salamanders ===
As of 29 August 2020, 759 species of salamanders are recognised by Amphibian Species of the World.

==== Suborder Cryptobranchoidea ====
- Family Cryptobranchidae – giant salamanders, 4 species
- Family Hynobiidae – Asiatic salamanders, 81 species
    - Subfamily Hynobiinae, 71 species
    - Subfamily Onychodactylinae – 10 species

==== Suborder Salamandroidea ====
- Family Ambystomatidae – mole salamanders, 37 species. The Pacific mole salamanders of genus Dicamptodon (4 species) are considered a distinct family, Dicamptodontidae, by AmphibiaWeb:
- Family Amphiumidae – amphiumas or Congo eels, 3 species
- Family Plethodontidae – lungless salamanders, 488 species
  - Subfamily Hemidactyliinae – 382 species; includes species formerly assigned to subfamilies Bolitoglossinae and Spelerpinae.
  - Subfamily: Plethodontinae – 106 species
- Family Proteidae – mudpuppies and waterdogs, 9 species
- Family Rhyacotritonidae – torrent salamanders, 4 species
- Family Salamandridae – true salamanders and newts, 128 species
  - Subfamily Pleurodelinae, 110 species
  - Subfamily Salamandrinae, 16 species
  - Subfamily Salamandrininae, 2 species

==== Suborder Sirenoidea ====
- Family Sirenidae – sirens, 5 species

=== Order Gymnophiona: Caecilians ===
As of 29 August 2020, 214 species of caecilians are recognised by Amphibian Species of the World.

- Family Caeciliidae – common caecilians, 44 species
- Family Chikilidae – 4 species
- Family Dermophiidae – 14 species
- Family Herpelidae – 10 species
- Family Ichthyophiidae – fish caecilians, 57 species. The genus Uraeotyphlus (7 species) is sometimes considered a distinct family, Uraeotyphlidae.
- Family Indotyphlidae – 24 species
- Family Rhinatrematidae – beaked caecilians, 13 species
- Family Scolecomorphidae – 6 species; formerly considered a subfamily of Caeciliidae
- Family Siphonopidae – 28 species
- Family Typhlonectidae – 14 species; formerly considered a subfamily of Caeciliidae

== See also ==
- List of California amphibians and reptiles
- List of amphibian genera
- List of prehistoric amphibians
- Amphibian

== Sources ==
- Frost, Darrel R. (2011). Amphibian Species of the World: an online reference. Version 5.5 (31 January 2011). American Museum of Natural History, New York, US.
