= List of Anuran families =

This list of Anuran families shows all extant families of Anura. Anura is an order of animals in the class Amphibia that includes frogs and toads. More than 5,000 species are described in the order. The living anurans are typically divided into three suborders: Archaeobatrachia, Mesobatrachia, and Neobatrachia. This classification is based on such morphological features as the number of vertebrae, the structure of the pectoral girdle, and the morphology of tadpoles.

== Taxonomy ==
The archaeobatrachians are the most primitive of frogs. These frogs have morphological characteristics which are found mostly in extinct frogs, and are absent in most of the modern frog species. Most of these characteristics are not common between all the families of Archaeobatrachia, or are not absent from all the modern species of frogs. However, all archaeobatrachians have free vertebrae, whereas all other species of frogs have their ribs fused to their vertebrae.

The Neobatrachia comprise the most modern species of frogs. Most of these frogs have morphological features which are more complex than those of the mesobatrachians and archaeobatrachians. The neobatrachians all have a palatine bone, which braces the upper jaw to the neurocranium. This is absent in all Archaeobatrachia and some Mesobatrachia. The third distal carpus is fused with the remaining carpal bones. The adductor longus muscle is present in the neobatrachians, but absent in the archaeobatrachians and some mesobatrachians. It is believed to have differentiated from pectineus muscle, and this differentiation has not occurred in the primitive frogs.

The Mesobatrachia are considered the evolutionary link between the Archaeobatrachia and the Neobatrachia. The families within the mesobatrachian suborder generally contain morphological features typical of both the other suborders. For example, the palatine bone is absent in all archaeobatrachians, and present in all neobatrachians. However, within the mesobatrachians families, it can be dependent on the species as to whether the palatine bone is present.

Due to the many morphological features which separate the frogs, many different systems are used for the classification of the anuran suborders. These different classification systems usually split the Mesobatrachia suborder.

== Families ==
Archaeobatrachia - four families, seven genera, 27 species
Family	Genera	Common names	Example species	Example photo
Ascaphidae (Fejérváry, 1923)	1	Tailed frogs	Tailed frog (Ascaphus truei)	
Bombinatoridae (Gray, 1825)	2	Fire-belly toads	European fire-bellied toad (Bombina bombina)	
Alytidae (Fitzinger, 1843)	3	Painted frogs or disc-tongued frogs	Portuguese or Iberian painted frog (Discoglossus galganoi)	
Leiopelmatidae (Mivart, 1869)	1	New Zealand primitive frogs	Hochstetters frog (Leiopelma hochstetteri)	
Mesobatrachia - six families, 21 genera, 168 species
Family	Genera	Common names	Example species	Example photo
Megophryidae (Bonaparte, 1850)	12	Litter frogs or short-legged toads	Long-nosed horned frog (Megophrys nasuta)	
Pelobatidae (Bonaparte, 1850)	1	European spadefoot toads	Common spadefoot (Pelobates fuscus)	
Pelodytidae (Bonaparte, 1850)	1	Parsley frogs	Common parsley frog (Pelodytes punctatus)	
Pipidae (Gray, 1825)	4	Tongueless frogs or clawed frogs	African dwarf frog (Hymenochirus boettgeri)	
Rhinophrynidae (Günther, 1859)	1	Mexican burrowing toad	Mexican burrowing toad (Rhinophrynus dorsalis)	
Scaphiopodidae (Cope, 1865)	2	American spadefoot toads	Western spadefoot toad (Spea hammondii)	
Neobatrachia - 26 families, 351 genera, more than 5,000 species
Family	Genera	Common names	Example species	Example photo
Allophrynidae (Goin, Goin, and Zug, 1978)	1	Tukeit Hill frog	Tukeit Hill frog (Allophryne ruthveni)	-
Amphignathodontidae (Boulenger, 1882)	2	Marsupial frogs	Marsupial frog (Gastrotheca excubitor)	
Arthroleptidae (Mivart, 1869)	8	Screeching frogs or squeakers	Buea screeching frog (Arthroleptis variabilis)	
Brachycephalidae (Günther, 1858)	2	Saddleback toads	Pumpkin toadlet (Brachycephalus ephippium)	
Brevicipitidae (Bonaparte, 1850)	5	Rain frogs	Cape rain frog (Breviceps gibbosus)	
Bufonidae (Gray, 1825)	52	True toads	Common toad (Bufo bufo)	
Centrolenidae (Taylor, 1951)	12	Glass frogs	Bare-hearted glass frog (Hyalinobatrachium colymbiphyllum)	
Dendrobatidae (Cope, 1865)	16	Poison dart frogs	Yellow-banded poison dart frog (Dendrobates leucomelas)	
Dicroglossidae; Anderson, 1871	14	Forked-tongue frogs	Lesser spiny frog (Quasipaa exilispinosa)	
Eleutherodactylidae (Lutz, 1954)	4	Rain frogs	Cliff chirping frog (Eleutherodactylus marnockii)	
Heleophrynidae (Noble, 1931)	2	Ghost frogs	Natal ghost frog (Heleophryne natalensis)	
Hemiphractidae; Peters, 1862	4	Horned treefrogs, backpack frogs	Banded horned treefrog (Hemiphractus fasciatus)	
Hemisotidae (Cope, 1867)	1	Shovelnose frogs	Marbled snout-burrower or mottled shovelnose frog (Hemisus marmoratus)	
Hylidae (Rafinesque, 1815)	58	Tree frogs	White's tree frog (Litoria caerulea)	
Hyperoliidae (Laurent, 1943)	17	Sedge frogs or bush frogs	Big-eyed tree frog (Leptopelis vermiculatus)	
Leptodactylidae (Werner, 1896)	13	Southern frogs or tropical frogs	Hispaniolan ditch frog (Leptodactylus albilabris)	
Mantellidae (Laurent, 1946)	12	-	Golden mantella (Mantella aurantiaca)	
Micrixalidae; Dubois, Ohler, and Biju, 2001	1	Dancing frogs	Black torrent frog (Micrixalus saxicola)	
Microhylidae (Günther, 1858)	57	Narrow-mouthed frogs	Eastern narrow-mouthed toad (Gastrophryne carolinensis)	
Myobatrachidae (Schlegel In Gray, 1850)	14	Australian ground frogs	Great barred frog (Mixophyes fasciolatus)	
Nyctibatrachidae; Blommers-Schlösser, 1993	3	Robust frogs, night frogs	Beddome's night frog (Nyctibatrachus beddomii)	
Ranidae (Rafinesque, 1814)	24	True frogs	American bullfrog (Lithobates catesbeianus)	
Ranixalidae; Dubois, 1987	2	Leaping frogs	Amboli leaping frog {Indirana chiravasi)	
Rhacophoridae (Hoffman, 1932)	23	Moss frogs	Malabar gliding frog (Rhacophorus malabaricus)	
Rhinodermatidae (Bonaparte, 1850)	2	Darwin's frogs	Darwin's frog (Rhinoderma darwinii)	
Sooglossidae (Noble, 1931)	2	Seychelles frogs	Gardiner's Seychelles frog (Sooglossus gardineri)	
