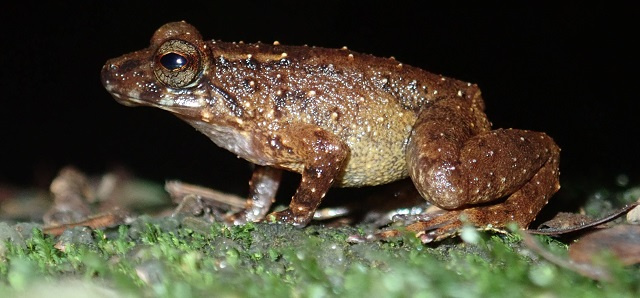
- Thomasset's Seychelles frog (Sooglossus thomasseti)
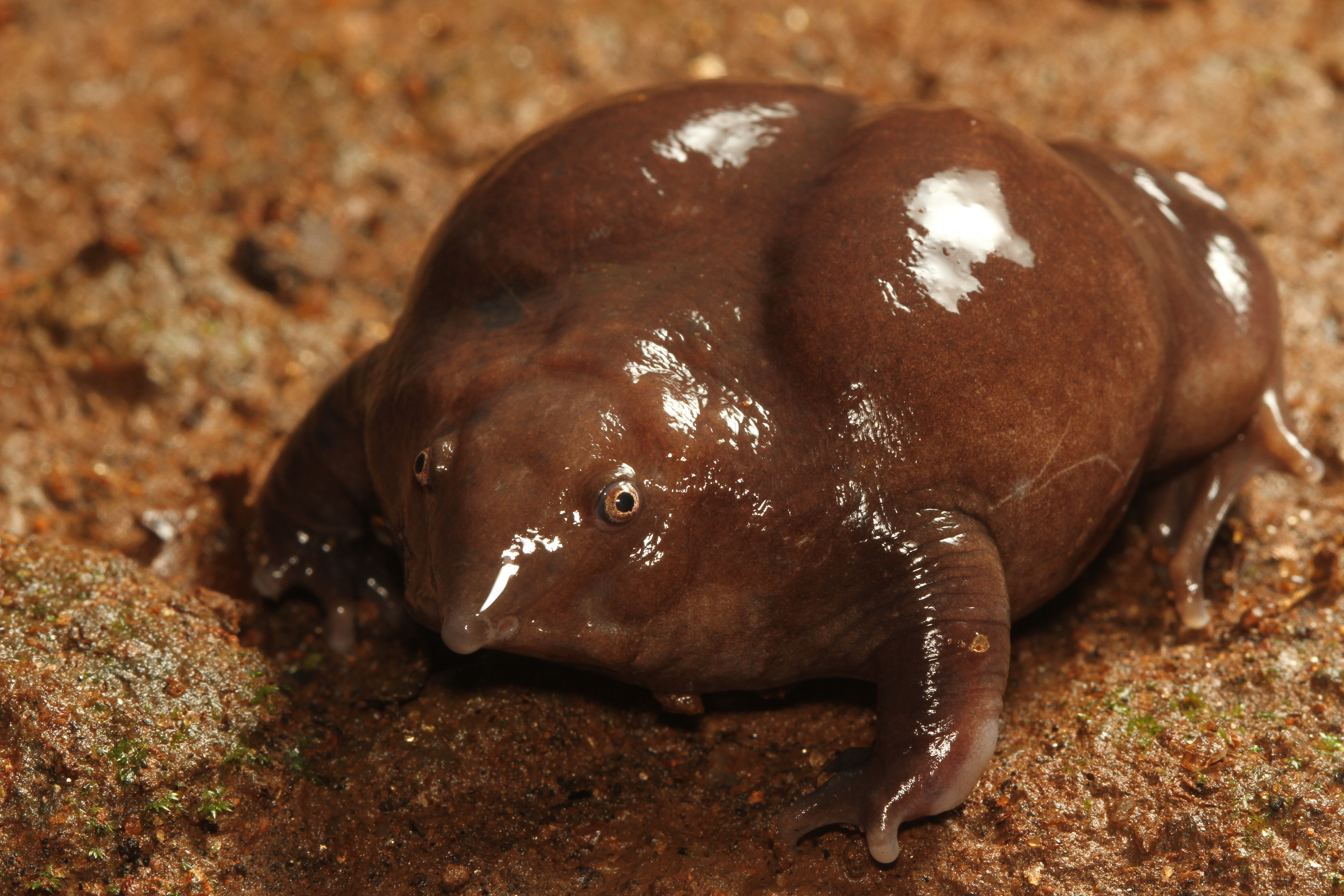
- Purple frog (Nasikabatrachus sahyadrensis)

Scientific classification
- Kingdom: Animalia
- Phylum: Chordata
- Class: Amphibia
- Order: Anura
- Suborder: Neobatrachia
- Superfamily: Sooglossoidea; Noble, 1931

Families
- Nasikabatrachidae; Sooglossidae

= Sooglossoidea =

Superfamily of frogs

Sooglossoidea is a superfamily of frogs. It contains only two highly divergent families consisting of three genera with two species each, one family being found in southwestern India and the other in the Seychelles.

== Taxonomy ==
The Sooglossoidea are an ancient division of the Neobatrachia; phylogenetic evidence indicates that they diverged from the rest of the Neobatrachia during the Early Cretaceous, about 125 million years ago, after colonizing Insular India from Africa. One family, the Nasikabatrachidae, remained in India; the other, Sooglossidae, was isolated on the Seychelles Microcontinent (which later turned into an island chain) after it split from India. Both families are thought to have diverged around the Cretaceous-Paleogene boundary.

Their exact phylogenetic relationships are disputed; previous studies found them to be the second-most basal member of the Neobatrachia, being sister to all other members of the group aside from Heleophrynidae, but more recent studies support them being significantly more derived and being the sister group to the Ranoidea.

Sooglossoidea contains the following families:

- Nasikabatrachidae Biju and Bossuyt, 2003 - purple pignosed frogs (2 species)
- Sooglossidae Noble, 1931 - Seychelles frogs (4 species)

Some studies suggest that the Late Cretaceous frog Indobatrachus, known from numerous fossil specimens from India, may also represent a member of the Sooglossoidea.
