= Seychelles palm frog =

Conservation status
- Critically Endangered (IUCN 3.1)

Scientific classification
- Kingdom: Animalia
- Phylum: Chordata
- Class: Amphibia
- Order: Anura
- Family: Sooglossidae
- Genus: Sechellophryne
- Species: S. pipilodryas

Binomial name
- Sechellophryne pipilodryas (Gerlach and Willi, 2002)

Synonyms
- Sooglossus pipilodryas Gerlach and Willi, 2002; Leptosooglossus pipilodryas (Gerlach and Willi, 2002)

Species of amphibian

The Seychelles palm frog (Sechellophryne pipilodryas) is a species of frog that is endemic to Silhouette Island in the Seychelles. It is closely related to Gardiner's frog, Sechellophryne gardineri.

The Seychelles palm frog inhabits forests higher than 150 m (490 ft) above sea level and is closely associated with the palm Phoenicophorium borsigianum (another Seychelles endemic); most individuals are found in axils of the palm. It is the most arboreal of the Sooglossidae. As a result, the palm frog is the most recent species of the family to have been discovered (in 2000).

The reproductive biology of this species is unknown, but it is presumed to involve direct development, i.e. eggs that hatch directly into froglets.

IUCN has reassessed the species in 2012 and concluded that Seychelles palm frog should be considered as "Critically Endangered" because of its small area of occupancy (about 7 km^{2} or 2.7 sq mi), decline in population size, and threats to its habitat. Its earlier (2004) classification was only "Vulnerable".
