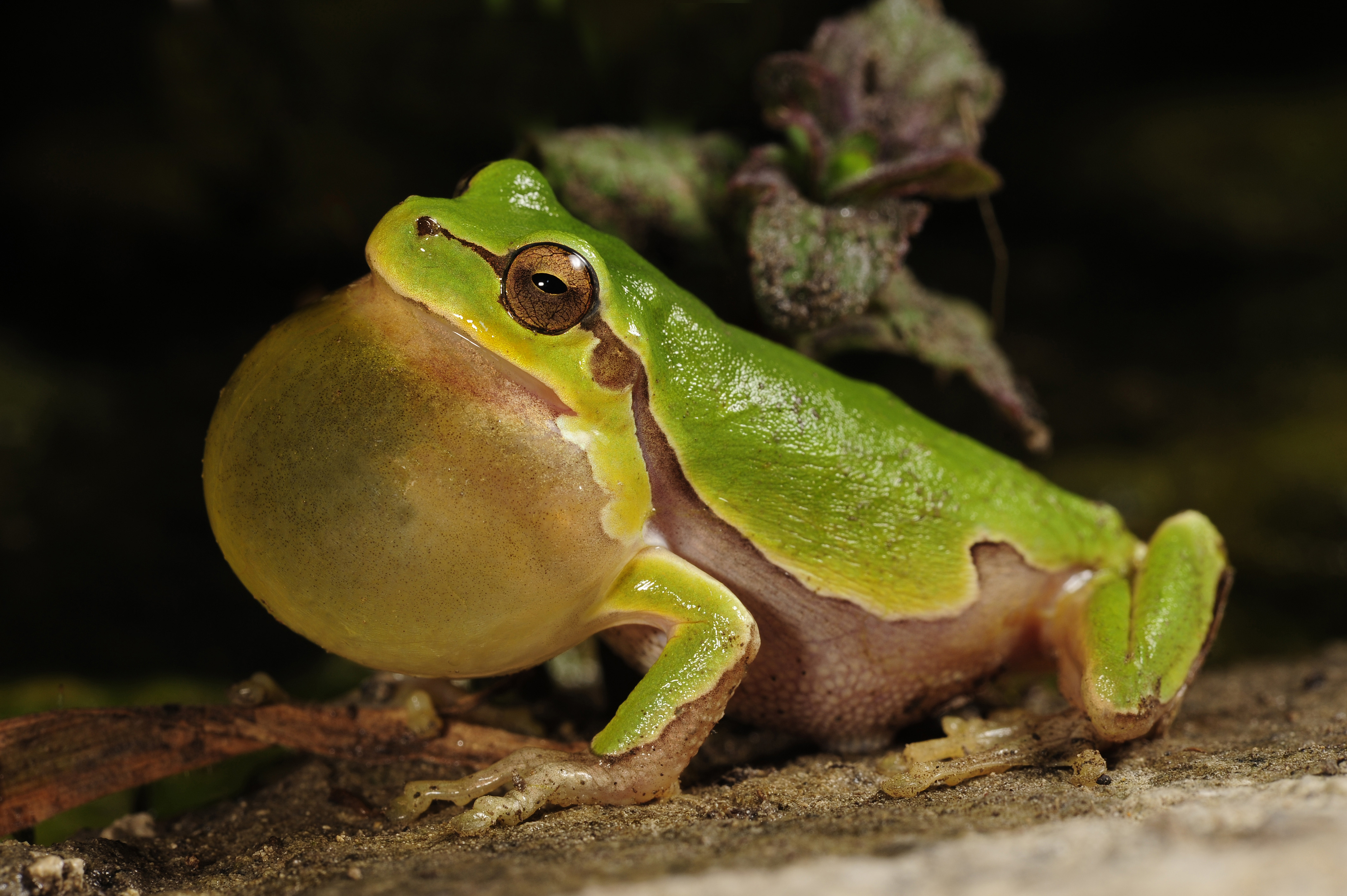
- Hyla intermedia

Scientific classification
- Kingdom: Animalia
- Phylum: Chordata
- Class: Amphibia
- Order: Anura
- Suborder: Neobatrachia
- Superfamily: Hyloidea; Stannius, 1856

Families
- See text

= Hyloidea =

Hyloidea Temporal range: Late Cretaceous–recent

Superfamily of amphibians

Litoria microbelos
call of Litoria microbelos

Hyloidea is a superfamily of frogs. Hyloidea accounts for 54% of all living anuran species. The superfamily Hyloidea branched off from its closest relative, the Australobatrachia, during the mid-Cretaceous. The fossil evidence found during the Cretaceous-Paleogene extinction event could not determine the effects upon the frogs, due to the lack of fossils. Increased forestation erupted after this extinction, possibly leading to more arboreal adaptations of these anurans to be best suited for this habitat.

== Taxonomy ==
Hyloidea contains the following subgroups:

- Allophrynidae (Savage, 1973) – Tukeit Hill frogs (3 species)
- Alsodidae (Mivart, 1869) – (26 species)
- Batrachylidae (Gallardo, 1965) – (14 species)
- Bufonidae – true toads and harlequin frogs (700 species)
- Brachycephaloidea
  - Brachycephalidae (Günther, 1858) – saddleback toads, flea toads and big-headed frogs (79 species)
  - Caligophrynidae Fouquet et al., 2023 (1 species)
  - Ceuthomantidae – emerald-barred frogs Heinicke et al., 2009 (4 species)
  - Craugastoridae (Hedges, Duellman, and Heinicke, 2008) – fleshbelly frogs, northern rain frogs, and robber frogs (129 species)
  - Eleutherodactylidae (Lutz, 1954) – robber frogs (241 species)
  - Neblinaphrynidae Fouquet et al., 2023 (1 species)
  - Strabomantidae Hedges, Duellman, and Heinecke, 2008 (800 species)
- Centrolenidae (Taylor, 1951) – glass frogs (155 species)
- Ceratophryidae (Tschudi, 1838) – common horned frogs, pacman frogs, and water frogs (12 species)
- Cycloramphidae (Peters, 1862) – glass frogs (36 species)
- Dendrobatoidea
  - Dendrobatidae (Cope, 1865) – poison frogs (194 species)
  - Aromobatidae (Grant, Frost, Caldwell, Gagliardo, Haddad, Kok, Means, Noonan, Schargel & Wheeler, 2006) – cryptic forest frogs (121 species)
- Hemiphractidae (Cope, 1865) – (112 species)
- Hylidae (Rafinesque, 1815) – tree frogs and leaf frogs (1036 species)
- Hylodidae (Günther, 1858) – (47 species)
- Phyllomedusidae Günther, 1858
- Pelodryadidae Günther, 1858
- Leptodactylidae (Werner, 1896 (1838)) – southern frogs (206 species)
- Odontophrynidae ( Lynch, 1969) – (53 species)
- Rhinodermatidae (Bonaparte, 1850) – Darwin's frogs or mouth-brooding frogs (3 species)
- Telmatobiidae (Fitzinger, 1843) – water frogs (63 species)

=== Phylogenetic relationships ===
Anurans all share a number of morphological characteristics, so researchers have had to use DNA testing to understand their relationships. ML and Bayesian analyses using a nuclear marker toolkit have resolved some of the relations of the anurans in Hyloidea. 53 out of the 55 previously established nodes on the phylogenetic tree were supported by this DNA testing. Analysis supports the Hyloidea being the sister group to the Australobatrachia, a clade of frogs containing species in Chile, Australia, and New Guinea. The common ancestor of both groups inhabited South America during the Early Cretaceous.

== Shared characteristics ==
Hyloidea is the largest superfamily of anurans due to scientists placing frogs into this family when the relationships to others are unknown. Therefore, Hyloidea has the highest species diversity. Hyloidea are all tailless, have shortened bodies, large mouths and muscular hind legs. Most anurans in the superfamily have a lateral‐bender which is a type of pelvis morphology found in walking, hopping and burrowing frogs. Some species that appear later in the taxon have a sagittal‐hinge pelvis found in aquatic frogs as well as walking, hopping and burrowing frogs and some have a fore–aft slider pelvis found in terrestrial frogs. Hyloidea anurans lack ribs, have complex mouthparts, and their pectoral girdle can be arciferal or firmisternal. They reproduce via axillary amplexus, and their larvae usually have a single spiracle. The average snout-vent length (SVL) of Hyloidea species vary widely, from 10 mm in one species of Diasporus to 320 mm in female Calyptocephalella gayi.

== Distribution ==
It is believed that Hyloidea frogs first evolved on the Gondwanan supercontinent in what is now southern South America. They soon spread throughout the world and resulted in many varieties and species of frogs that adapted to their new environments. Due to the nature of their original environment, Hyloidea frogs are more associated with higher temperatures no matter where they are found in the world. Today, they can be found in every continent except Antarctica, although in 2020 a roughly 40 million year old fossil from the hyloid family Calyptocephalellidae was discovered on Seymour Island in the Antarctic Peninsula. The distribution of Hyloidea species is highly correlated with climate, with most species found in areas with higher annual mean temperatures.

== Conservation ==
As of March 2024, out of over 50000 Hyloidea frogs represented on the IUCN Red List, 3866 were listed as critically endangered (4.5%), 5910 as endangered (6.8%), and 6774 as vulnerable (7.8%). However, there is still a great deal of the frogs, about 49000, that are considered as 'Least concern' and not being threatened. Most of the frogs of greater concern are all undergoing habitat loss that contributes to their dwindling numbers. Some of the reasons why are due to urbanization, farming, mining, and deforestation.
