= Nasikabatrachus bhupathi =

Conservation status
- Critically Endangered (IUCN 3.1)

Scientific classification
- Kingdom: Animalia
- Phylum: Chordata
- Class: Amphibia
- Order: Anura
- Family: Nasikabatrachidae
- Genus: Nasikabatrachus
- Species: N. bhupathi

Binomial name
- Nasikabatrachus bhupathi Janani, Vasudevan, Prendini, Dutta, and Aggarwal, 2017
- Approximate distribution Range

Species of amphibian

Nasikabatrachus bhupathi, or Bhupathy's purple frog, is a frog species belonging to the family Nasikabatrachidae. It can be found in the Western Ghats in India and was discovered near the Srivilliputhur Grizzled Giant Squirrel Wildlife Sanctuary. The specific epithet honors the late Indian herpetologist Subramanian Bhupathy (1963–2014).

== Taxonomy ==
Nasikabatrachus bhupathi and Nasikabatrachus sahyadrensis have been found to be related to other frogs that live in the Seychelles, which are closer to Africa than to India. This is consistent with the idea that Africa and India were once part of the same ancient supercontinent, called Gondwana, which eventually became part of the later supercontinent, Pangaea.

== Description ==
The species has purple skin and blue eyes and lives underground. It differs genetically, morphologically, and acoustically from the closely related Nasikabatrachus sahyadrensis. Speciation between the two species is likely caused by the different monsoon seasons on the different sides of the Western Ghats, causing N. sahyadrensis to breed between May and August and N. bhupathi to breed between October and December.

== Status ==
This species is considered Critically Endangered on the IUCN Red List due to its very small range, which is mostly threatened by water extraction, pollution, and disturbance from tourism.
