= Sooglossus =

Scientific classification
- Domain: Eukaryota
- Kingdom: Animalia
- Phylum: Chordata
- Class: Amphibia
- Order: Anura
- Family: Sooglossidae
- Genus: Sooglossus; Boulenger, 1906

Genus of amphibians

Sooglossus is a genus of sooglossid frogs found in the Seychelles.

== Species ==
There are two species recognised in the genus Sooglossus:

- Seychelles frog (Sooglossus sechellensis) (Boettger, 1896)
- Thomasset's Seychelles frog (Sooglossus thomasseti) (Boulenger, 1909)
