= Nayaganaipriyal =

Nayaganaipriyal Nayaganaipirial
- village
- Interactive map of Nayaganaipriyal
- Coordinates: 11°07′38″N 79°20′38″E
- Country: India
- State: Tamil Nadu
- District: Ariyalur

Population (2011)
  - Total: 4,127

Languages
  - Official: Tamil
- Time zone: UTC+5:30 (IST)
- Vehicle registration: TN-
- Coastline: 0 kilometres (0 mi)
- Sex ratio: 938 ♂/♀
- Literacy: 63.36%
- Panchayath President (2020) KP Maruthakasi as KPM

Nayaganaipriyal, also named Nayaganaipiriyal, is a village in the Udayarpalayam taluk of Ariyalur district, Tamil Nadu, India.

== Demographics ==
As per the 2011 census, Nayaganaipriyal had a total population of 4127 with 1998 males and 2129 females. Contrary to the national gender distribution of 1.06, the ratio here was 0.94.

1,194 inhabitants belonged to scheduled castes (28,93 %), and 256 (6,20 %) to scheduled tribes.

Rajaraman won the 2022 Local Panchayath By-election president post.

== Notable people ==
The biologist Subramanian Bhupathy was born here.
