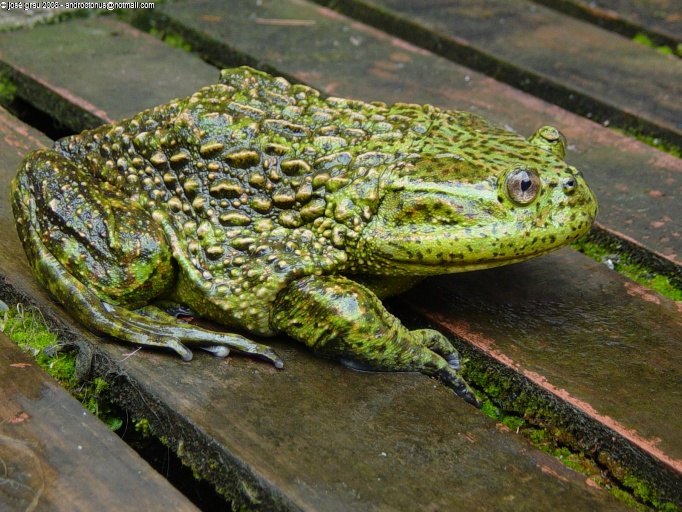

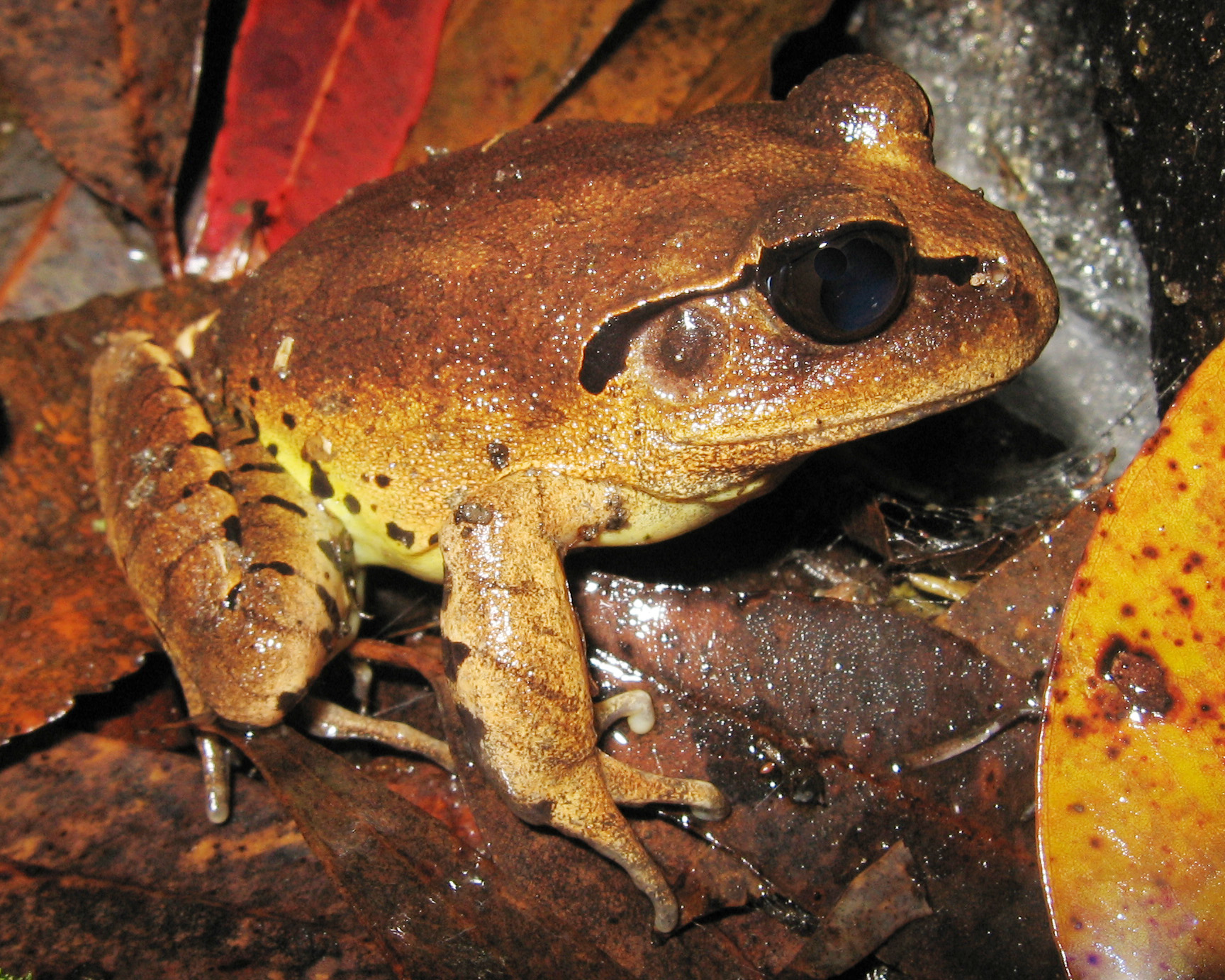
- Calyptocephalella gayi above, Mixophyes fasciolatus below

Scientific classification
- Kingdom: Animalia
- Phylum: Chordata
- Class: Amphibia
- Order: Anura
- Suborder: Neobatrachia
- Clade: Australobatrachia; Frost et al., 2006

Families
- Calyptocephalellidae; Limnodynastidae; Myobatrachidae

= Australobatrachia =

Australobatrachia Temporal range: Late Cretaceous–present

Clade of frogs

Australobatrachia ("southern frogs") is a clade of frogs in the suborder Neobatrachia. It comprises three families of frogs with a Gondwanan distribution, being known from Chile, Australia, and New Guinea. Together, they form the sister group to the superfamily Hyloidea.

== Taxonomy ==
The common ancestor of all three families inhabited South America during the Early Cretaceous (about 125 million years ago). By about 100 million years ago, the ancestors of the Calyptocephalellidae diverged from the Myobatrachoidea, as the ancestral Myobatrachoidea moved south, colonizing the Australian continent via the Antarctic land bridge. The two families within Myobatrachoidea diverged from each other later in the Cretaceous or during the earliest Paleocene.

Australobatrachia contains the following subgroups:

- Calyptocephalellidae Reig, 1960 - Chilean toads (5 species)
- Myobatrachoidea
  - Limnodynastidae Lynch, 1969 - Australian ground frogs (44 species)
  - Myobatrachidae Schlegel, 1850 - Australian froglets and Australian toadlets (91 species)
