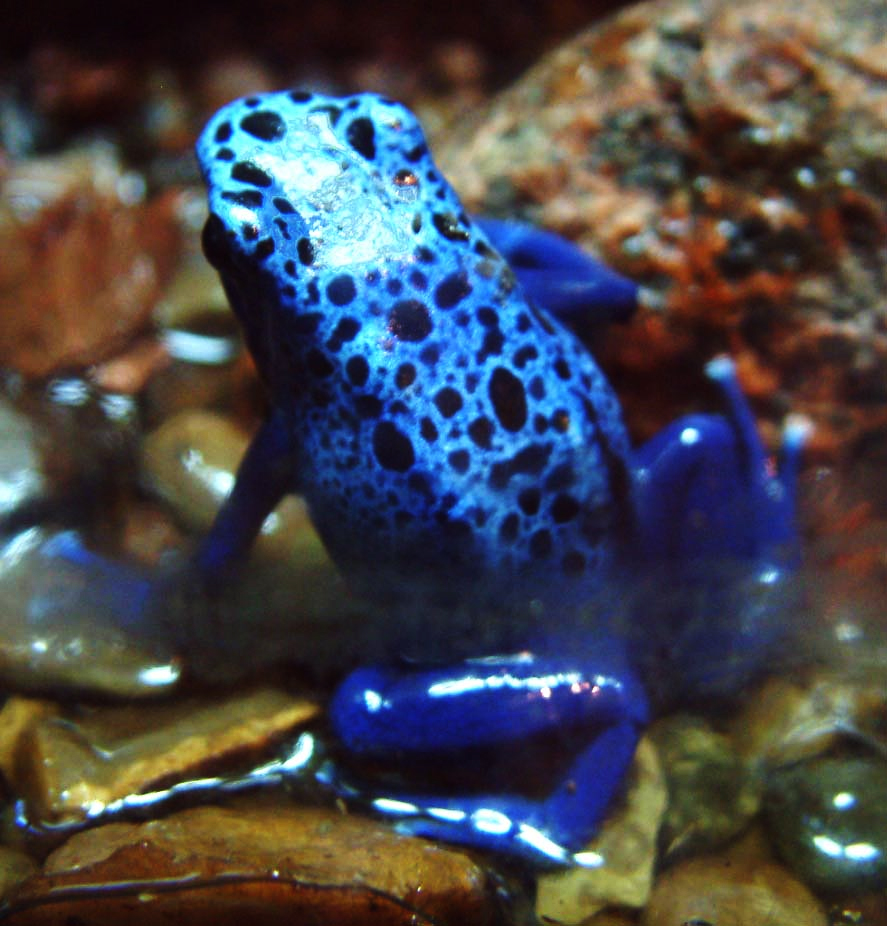
- Dendrobates tinctorius "azureus"

Scientific classification
- Kingdom: Animalia
- Phylum: Chordata
- Class: Amphibia
- Order: Anura
- Suborder: Neobatrachia; Reig, 1958

Subdivisions
- †Cretadhefdaa †Indobatrachus; Heleophrynoidea; Hyloidea; Australobatrachia; Sooglossoidea; Ranoidea

= Neobatrachia =

Neobatrachians Temporal range: Early Cretaceous – recent, 122–0 Ma

Suborder of amphibians

Litoria microbelos
call of Litoria microbelos

The Neobatrachia (Neo-Latin neo- ("new") + batrachia ("frogs")) are a suborder of the Anura, the order of frogs and toads.

This suborder is the most advanced and apomorphic of the three anuran suborders alive today, hence its name, which literally means "new frogs" (from the hellenic words neo, meaning "new" and batrachia, meaning "frogs"). It is also by far the largest of the three; its more than 5,000 different species make up over 96% of all living anurans.

The differentiation between Archaeobatrachia, Mesobatrachia, and Neobatrachia is based primarily on anatomic differences, especially the skeletal structure, as well as several visible characteristics and behaviors.

== Systematics ==
Separating the Anura into the Archaeo-, Meso- and Neobatrachia is somewhat controversial; as more research is done and more knowledge is gained, it is becoming even less clear, because many characteristics used for this differentiation apply to more than one group.

Neobatrachia are usually sorted into five superfamilies, but this division is also controversial, as some families are placed into different superfamilies by different authors. In addition, several families have been revealed to be paraphyletic and consequently divided to make them correspond to clades and thus be natural, evolutionary groups. This has approximately doubled the number of presently recognized neobatrachian families.

=== List of families ===
The clades and families currently accepted in the Neobatrachia are:

- Superfamily Heleophrynoidea:
  - Heleophrynidae – ghost frogs
- Clade Australobatrachia:
  - Calyptocephalellidae – Chilean toads
  - Superfamily Myobatrachoidea
    - Limnodynastidae – Australian ground frogs
    - Myobatrachidae – Australian froglets
- Superfamily Hyloidea:
  - Allophrynidae – Tukeit hill frogs
  - Amphignathodontidae – marsupial frogs (sometimes in Hemiphractidae)
  - Alsodidae
  - Batrachylidae
  - Clade Brachycephaloidea
    - Caligophrynidae Fouquet et al., 2023
    - Brachycephalidae – saddleback toads
    - Ceuthomantidae – emerald-barred frogs
    - Craugastoridae Hedges, Duellmann & Heinicke, 2008 (formerly in Brachycephalidae)
    - Eleutherodactylidae Lutz, 1954 (formerly in Brachycephalidae)
    - Neblinaphrynidae Fouquet et al., 2023
    - Strabomantidae Hedges, Duellmann & Heinicke, 2008 (some formerly in Brachycephalidae)
  - Bufonidae – true toads
  - Centrolenidae – glass frogs
  - Ceratophryidae – horned toads
  - Cycloramphidae
  - Clade Dendrobatoidea
    - Aromobatidae – skunk frog (sometimes in Dendrobatidae)
    - Dendrobatidae – poison dart frogs
  - Hemiphractidae – marsupial frogs
  - Hylidae – true tree frogs and relatives
  - Hylodidae – giant Neotropical torrent frogs
  - Leiuperidae (sometimes in Leptodactylidae)
  - Leptodactylidae – southern frogs, tropical frogs
  - Odontophrynidae
  - Rhinodermatidae – Darwin's frogs
  - Telmatobiidae – water frogs
- Superfamily Sooglossoidea:
  - Nasikabatrachidae – purple frogs
  - Sooglossidae – Seychelles frogs
- Superfamily Ranoidea:
  - Microhylidae – narrow-mouthed frogs
  - Clade Afrobatrachia:
    - Arthroleptidae – squeakers
    - Brevicipitidae – rain frogs
    - Hemisotidae – shovelnose frogs
    - Hyperoliidae – sedge frogs, bush frogs
  - Clade Natatanura:
    - Ceratobatrachidae
    - Conrauidae - slippery frogs, giant frogs
    - Dicroglossidae – fork-tongued frogs
    - Micrixalidae – dancing frogs
    - Mantellidae – Malagasy frogs
    - Nyctibatrachidae – night frogs
    - Odontobatrachidae
    - Petropedetidae – torrent frogs
    - Phrynobatrachidae – puddle frogs
    - Ptychadenidae – grassland frogs
    - Pyxicephalidae
    - Ranidae – true frogs
    - Ranixalidae – Indian frogs
    - Rhacophoridae – shrub frogs, bush frogs, moss frogs
