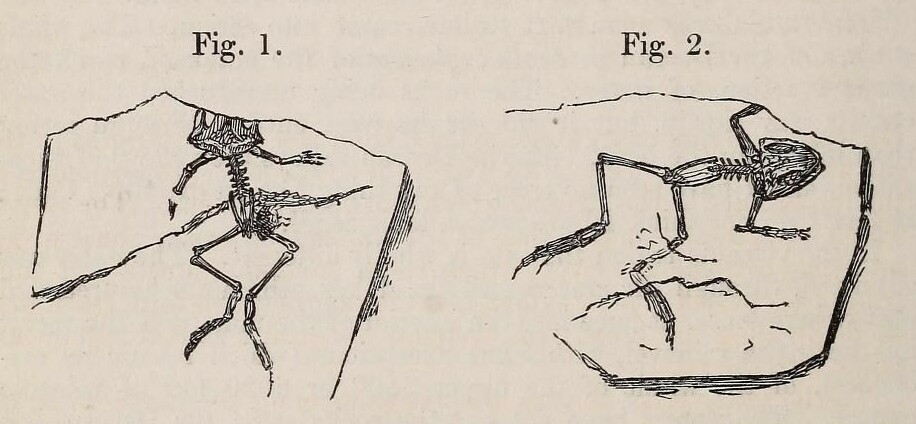
- Illustration of fossil specimens

Scientific classification
- Kingdom: Animalia
- Phylum: Chordata
- Class: Amphibia
- Order: Anura
- Suborder: Neobatrachia
- Genus: †Indobatrachus; Noble, 1930
- Species: †I. pusillus

Binomial name
- †Indobatrachus pusillus (Owen, 1847)

Synonyms
- Rana pusilla Owen, 1847; Indobatrachus trivialis Chiplonkar, 1940; Indobatrachus malabaricus Verma, 1965

= Indobatrachus =

Indobatrachus Temporal range: Early Paleocene, 62.5 Ma

Species of amphibian

Indobatrachus (Greek for "Indian frog") is an extinct genus of frog known from the Early Paleocene (Danian) of India. It contains a single species, Indobatrachus pusillus. Two other species, I. trivialis and I. malabaricus, were also previously described, but these have since been synonymized with I. pusillus.

Indobatrachus was a very small frog, only 20 millimetres (0.79 in) long as an adult. It is known from numerous complete but poorly-preserved specimens (known by Richard Owen as "batracholites") from the Intertrappean Beds of Worli Hill, Mumbai. The stratigraphy of the specimens is disputed; they were originally dated to the Early Eocene, but later thought to be latest Cretaceous in age (66 mya). However, more recently, the intertrappean rocks around Mumbai have been dated to the late Danian, around 62.5 million years ago, representing the youngest eruptive event in the western Deccan volcanic province.

The taxonomy of this genus is debated; it was previously classified within the Australian frog superfamily Myobatrachoidea by many authors, including Owen, but such a relationship is now considered dubious or untenable, with only some vertebral similarities linking the two groups. Alternatively, it may represent a member of the superfamily Sooglossoidea, another ancient group that is thought to have originated on Insular India during the Cretaceous.
