= Subramanian Bhupathy =

Indian herpetologist

Subramanian Bhupathy (also spelled as Subramaniam Bhupathy) (17 July 1962 Nayaganaipiriyal, Tamil Nadu, India – 28 April 2014 Agastya Malai Hills, Kerala, India) was an Indian herpetologist, wildlife biologist and researcher. He was a principal scientist at the Salim Ali Centre for Ornithology and Natural History (SACON). He headed a three-year study on the patterns of distribution of selected faunal groups on the Agasthyamalai hills. He worked on lizards, amphibians and birds and his contributions and works were more focused on reptiles. Dr Bhupathy was noted for work on pythons and python ecology in India and Indian turtles and tortoises.

He began his career in the mid-1980s when laboratories were not well-equipped. He held a PhD in zoology (ornithology) from University of Rajasthan, Jaipur. At the age of 51, Bhupathy died after a fall while conducting herpetology field work near Agastya Mala hills on 28 April 2014.

== Recognition ==
- He was posthumously honored with the Turtle Conservation Appreciation Awards in 2015 by the Tortoise and Freshwater Turtle Specialist Group, International Union for Conservation of Nature (IUCN) and Species Survival Commission (SSC), for his contributions to the Conservation and Biology of Indian Chelonians.
- The species Nasikabatrachus bhupathi, a frog discovered in 2017 in the Western Ghats, and Uropeltis bhupathyi, a snake discovered in 2018 in Tamil Nadu, were named in his honor.
- Bufoides Bhupathyi, a toad species found in Dampa Tiger reserve is also named after him.
