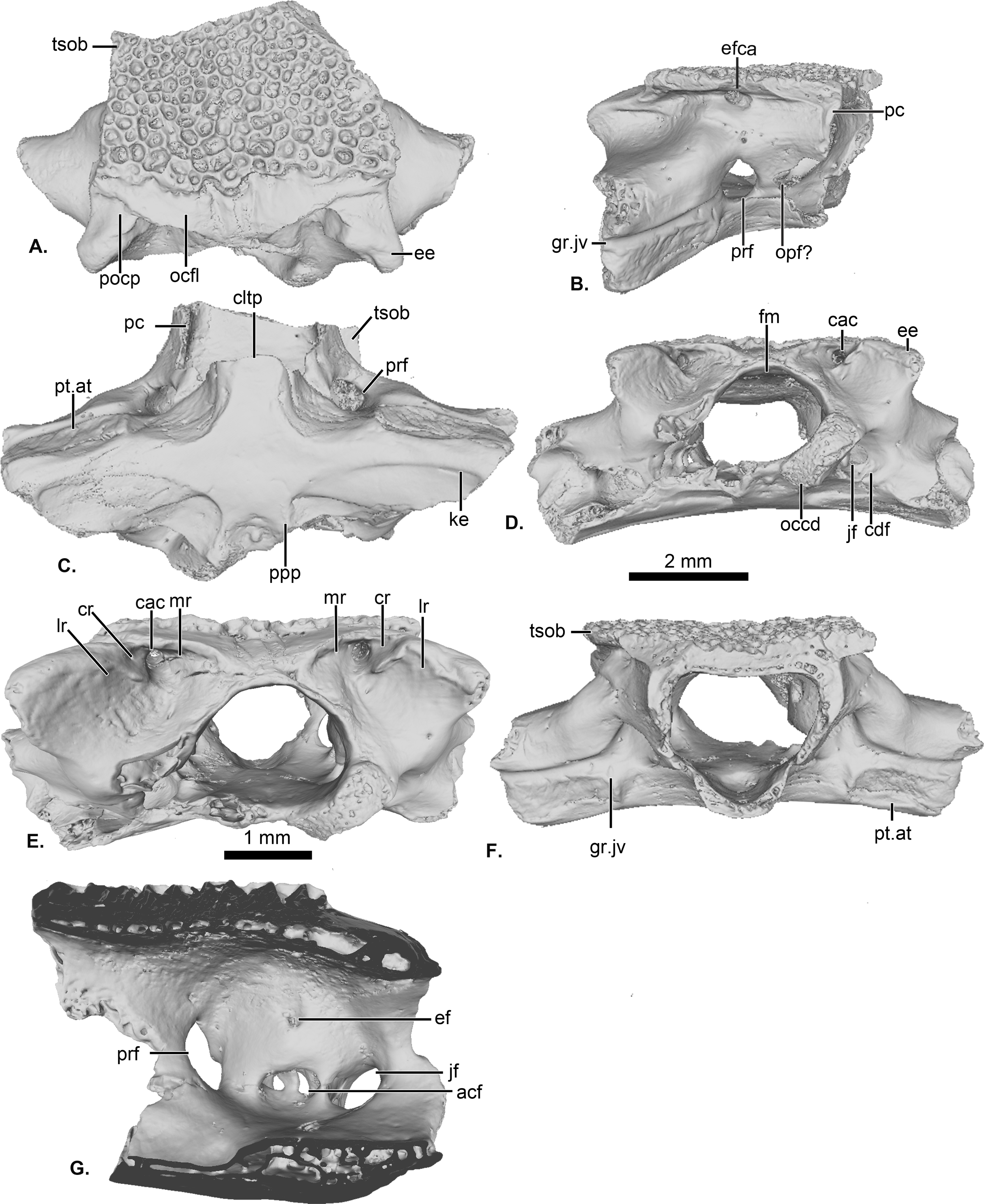
- Fossil material

Scientific classification
- Kingdom: Animalia
- Phylum: Chordata
- Class: Amphibia
- Order: Anura
- Suborder: Neobatrachia
- Genus: †Cretadhefdaa; Lemierre & Blackburn, 2022
- Species: †C. taouzensis

Binomial name
- †Cretadhefdaa taouzensis Lemierre & Blackburn, 2022

= Cretadhefdaa =

Cretadhefdaa Temporal range: Cenomanian, 96–95 Ma

Extinct genus of frogs

Cretadhefdaa is an extinct genus of frog from the Late Cretaceous (Cenomanian) Kem Kem Group of Morocco. It contains only the species C. taouzensis from the middle Cenomanian Douira Formation, known from some vertebrae and cranial elements. The genus name is a combination of Cretaceous and dhefdaa, the Arabic word for "frog", while the species name references the city of Taouz, near which it was discovered.

Cretadhefdaa is a member of the modern frog group Neobatrachia, making it the oldest known neobatrachian outside of South America, and the second neobatrachian known from the Mesozoic of Africa along with the much later Beelzebufo. Africa is thought to have been an important region for the evolution of the Neobatrachia, namely for the diverse superfamily Ranoidea, of which no Cretaceous fossils are known. Cretadhefdaa shares some morphological similarities with Ranoidea, although it cannot be confidently assigned to the group.
