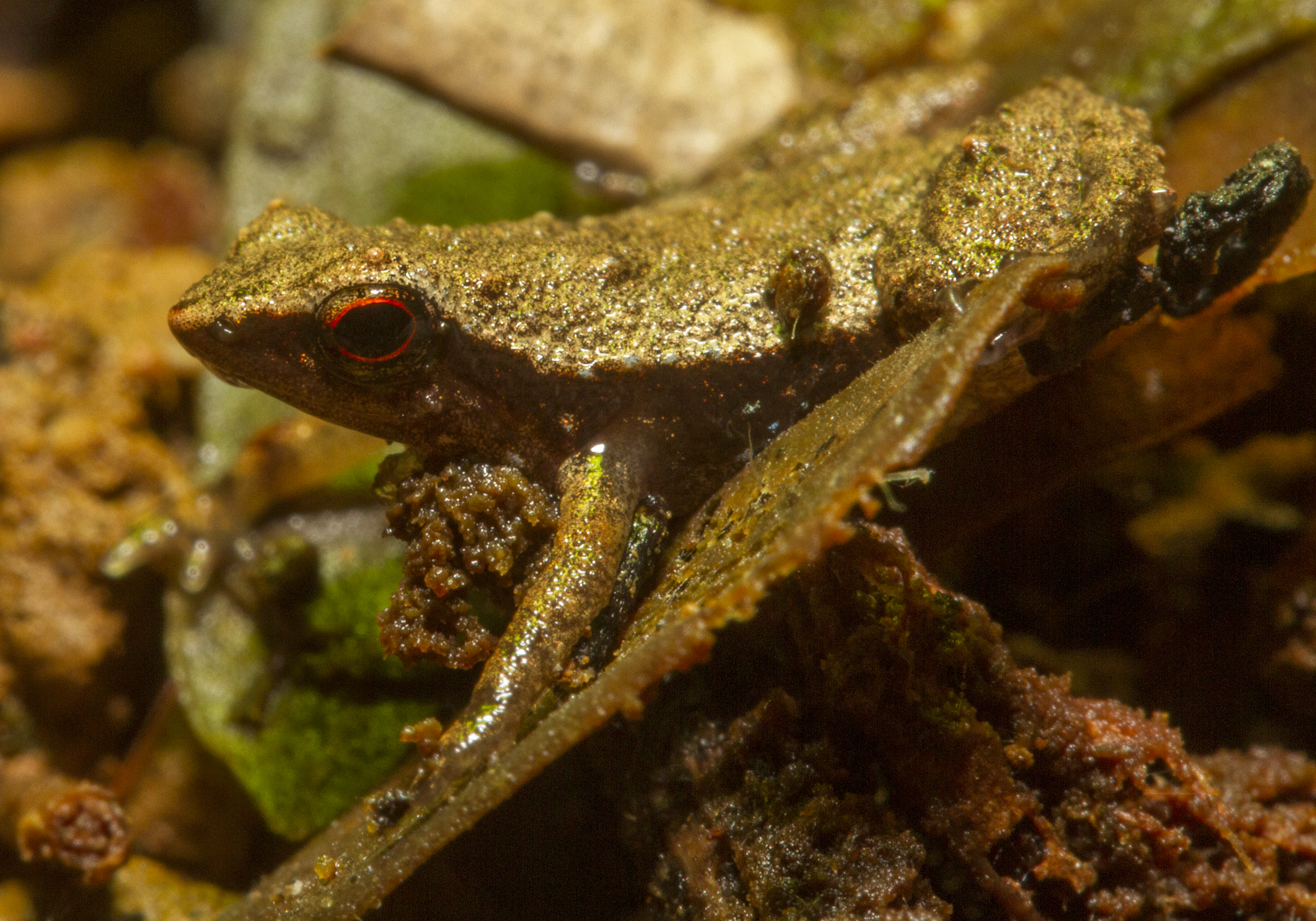
- Gardiner's Seychelles frog, Sechellophryne gardineri

Scientific classification
- Kingdom: Animalia
- Phylum: Chordata
- Class: Amphibia
- Order: Anura
- Family: Sooglossidae
- Genus: Sechellophryne; Nussbaum and Wu, 2007

= Sechellophryne =

Genus of amphibians

Sechellophryne is a small genus of sooglossid frogs with only two members living in the Seychelles.

== Species ==
- Sechellophryne gardineri Boulenger, 1911
- Sechellophryne pipilodryas Gerlach and Willi, 2002
