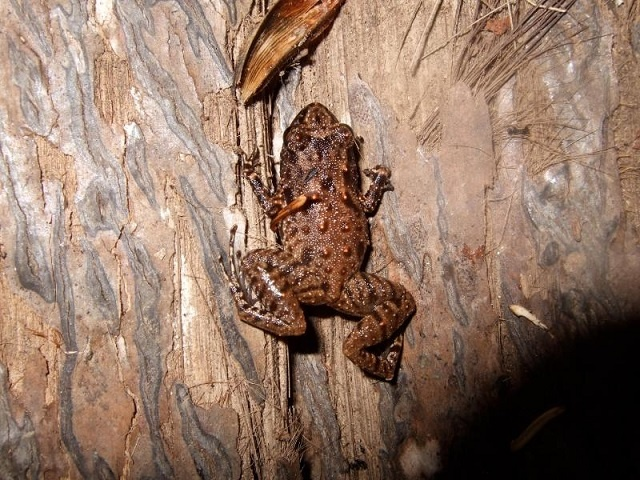

Conservation status
- Endangered (IUCN 3.1)'

Scientific classification
- Kingdom: Animalia
- Phylum: Chordata
- Class: Amphibia
- Order: Anura
- Family: Sooglossidae
- Genus: Sooglossus
- Species: S. sechellensis

Binomial name
- Sooglossus sechellensis (Boettger, 1896)

= Seychelles frog =

Sooglossus sechellensis

Species of amphibian

The Seychelles frog (Sooglossus sechellensis) is a species of frog endemic to Mahé, Silhouette and Praslin islands in the Seychelles. It inhabits the floor of damp rainforest at altitudes from 150 m (490 ft) to 991 m (3,251 ft) above sea level. Higher altitude sites are considered to be more climatically stable and more suitable. The species is present in Morne Seychellois National Park, Silhouette National Park and Praslin National Park.

The reproductive biology of this species is unusual. Eggs are laid on the ground and guarded until they hatch. The tadpoles are thereafter carried on one of their parent's backs.

The IUCN assessed the species as "Endangered" in 2013. Although it is locally common, it has a small area of occupancy (about 29 km^{2}), a severely fragmented habitat and distribution, and a declining population, particularly at lower altitudes. It is threatened by habitat degradation due to fire and invasive species (the tree Cinnamomum verum and the yellow crazy ant, Anoplolepis gracilipes). In addition, climate change projections predict a steady shrinkage in its area of habitat due to declining rainfall.

Genetic analysis indicates that the three populations of this species are all distinct from each other and are possibly even separate species. It has been proposed that each of the three populations be considered evolutionary significant units for conservation purposes.
