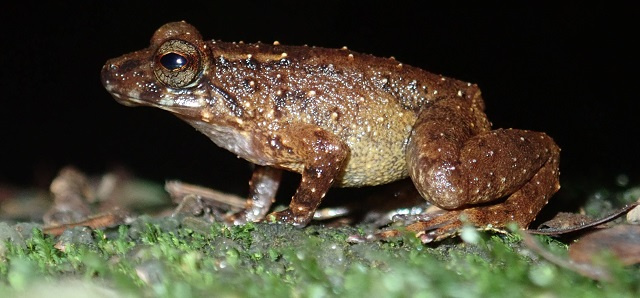

Conservation status
- Critically Endangered (IUCN 3.1)

Scientific classification
- Kingdom: Animalia
- Phylum: Chordata
- Class: Amphibia
- Order: Anura
- Family: Sooglossidae
- Genus: Sooglossus
- Species: S. thomasseti

Binomial name
- Sooglossus thomasseti (Boulenger, 1909)

Synonyms
- Nesomantis thomasseti Boulenger, 1909

= Thomasset's Seychelles frog =

Species of amphibian

Thomasset's Seychelles frog or Thomasset's frog (Sooglossus thomasseti) is a species of frog in the family Sooglossidae. It is endemic to Seychelles. There are two known populations: one on Silhouette Island and one on Mahé Island.

The natural habitats of this frog are subtropical or tropical moist lowland forests, subtropical or tropical moist montane forests, rivers, and intermittent rivers. Eggs are laid among rocks and hatch into miniature adults, bypassing a larval stage. The species is threatened by habitat loss.

Genetic analysis indicates that the two populations of this species are distinct from each other and are possibly even separate species. It has thus been proposed that both populations be considered evolutionary significant units for conservation purposes.

This frog, the rarest in Seychelles, was named for its discoverer, Hans Paul Thomasset (186–1949).
