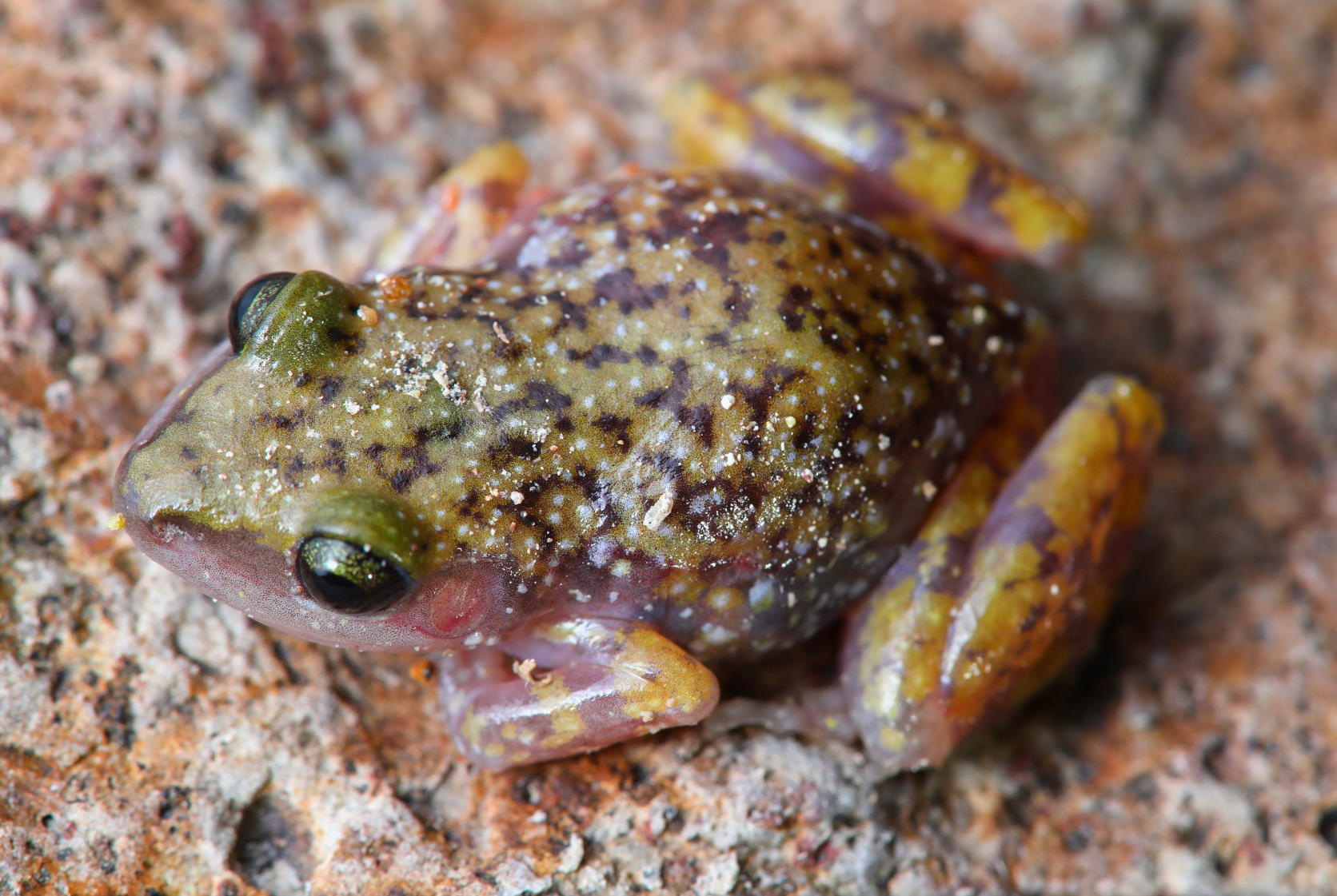
- Eleuthrodactylus marnockii

Conservation status
- Least Concern (IUCN 3.1)

Scientific classification
- Kingdom: Animalia
- Phylum: Chordata
- Class: Amphibia
- Order: Anura
- Family: Eleutherodactylidae
- Genus: Eleutherodactylus
- Subgenus: Syrrhophus
- Species: E. marnockii

Binomial name
- Eleutherodactylus marnockii (Cope, 1878)

Synonyms
- Syrrhophus marnockii Cope, 1878; Hylodes marnockii (Cope, 1878)

= Eleutherodactylus marnockii =

Species of amphibian

Eleutherodactylus marnockii, the cliff chirping frog, is a small eleutherodactylid frog found in Central and West Texas, United States, and in Coahuila and Chihuahua, northern Mexico. It is also known as the cliff frog and Marnock's frog.

== Taxonomy ==
Synonymy of Eleutherodactylus guttilatus with this species has been proposed but is not accepted by all authors. Intermediates between the two species have been reported from Nuevo León in northern Mexico. Some subpopulations of E. guttilatus from Big Bend, Texas, northern Coahuila and Chihuahua are treated as E. marnockii by the International Union for Conservation of Nature.

== Description ==
Adult cliff frogs are 19–38 mm (0.75–1.5 in) in length. They have greenish ground color with brown mottling, often with banding on the rear legs. They have somewhat flattened bodies which allow them to hide in rock crevices.

== Behavior and habitat ==
Cliff chirping frogs are nocturnal and live most of their lives on limestone rock faces. They may also be found in caves, pinion forests, juniper forests, scrub, grassland, suburban areas and city parks. Like most frogs, they will hop, but they are also capable of crawling, which aids them in hiding in rock crevices.

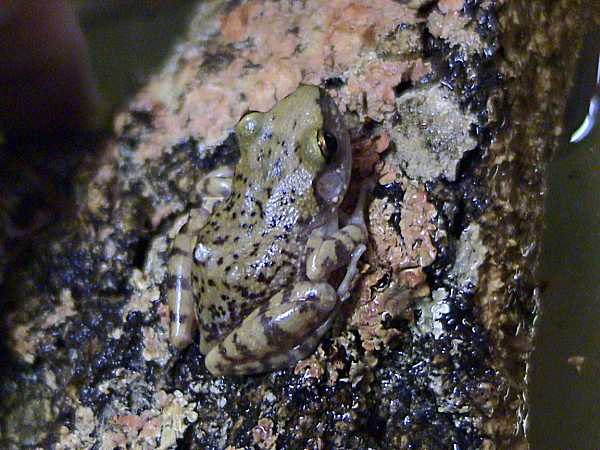
Cliff chirping frog, Eleutherodactylus marnockii

== Reproduction ==
Breeding occurs year-round, except at the coldest times of the winter, but generally peaks during the rainy season in April and May. Females can lay up to three clutches of eggs a year, in a moist substrate of leaf litter or soil. Males may call from crevices in limestone, using the cavities within the rock to amplify the volume of their chirp to more effective attract a mate.
