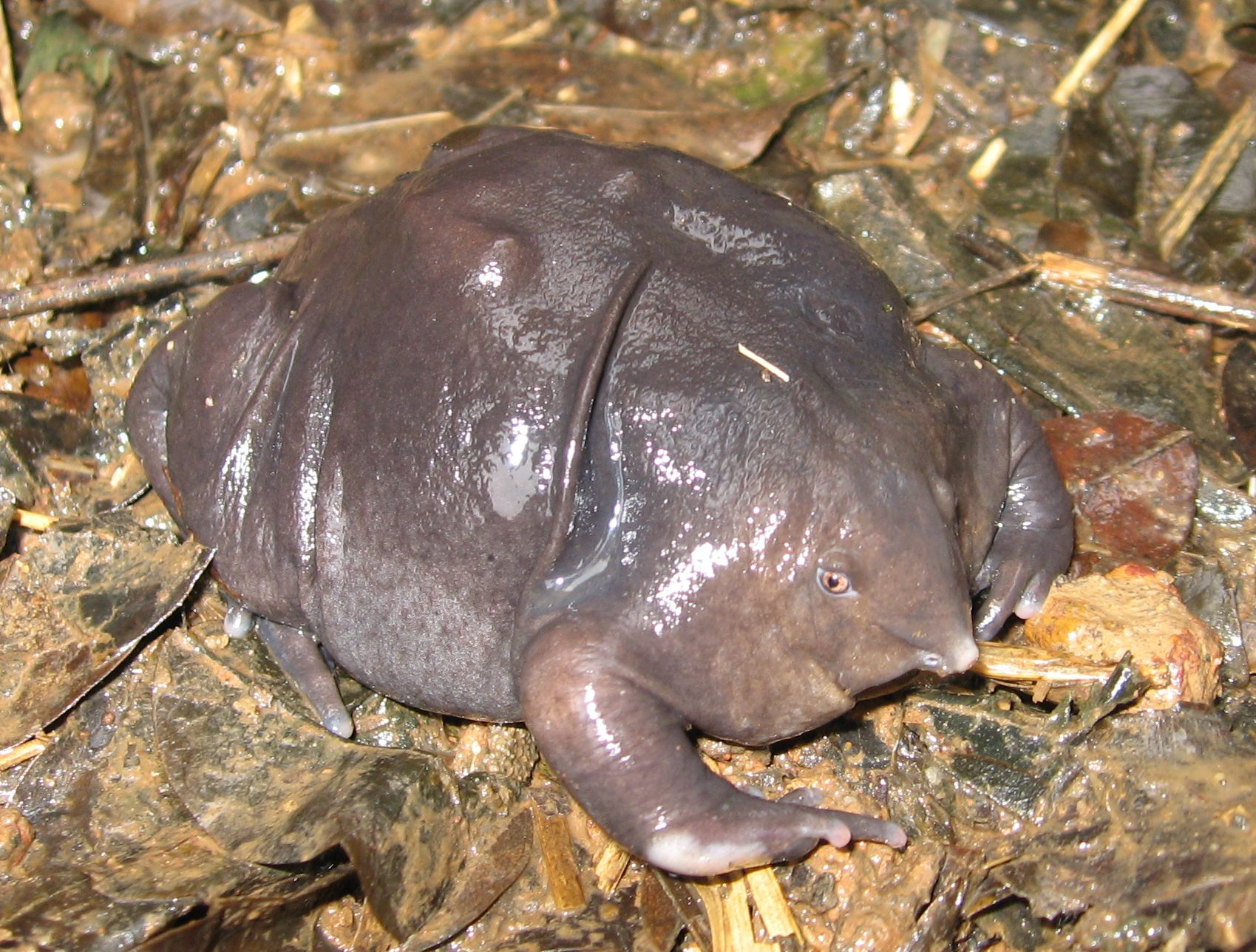
- Nasikabatrachus sahyadrensis

Conservation status
- Near Threatened (IUCN 3.1)

Scientific classification
- Kingdom: Animalia
- Phylum: Chordata
- Class: Amphibia
- Order: Anura
- Family: Nasikabatrachidae
- Genus: Nasikabatrachus
- Species: N. sahyadrensis

Binomial name
- Nasikabatrachus sahyadrensis Biju & Bossuyt, 2003
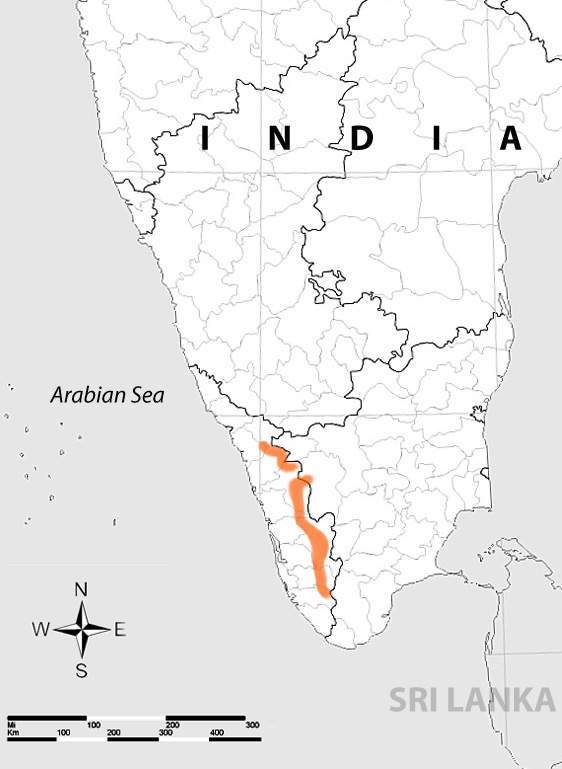
- Distribution range of Nasikabatrachus sahyadrensis (in ORANGE)

Audio
- Calls of Nasikabatrachus sahyadrensis

= Purple frog =

Species of amphibian

The purple frog (Nasikabatrachus sahyadrensis), also known commonly as the Indian purple frog, the Mahabali frog, and the pignose frog, is a frog species in the family Nasikabatrachidae. The species is endemic to the Western Ghats in India. Although the adult frog was formally described in October 2003, the juvenile form of the species had been described earlier in 1917.

== History of the discovery ==
Nasikabatrachus sahyadrensis was described specimens collected in the Idukki district of Kerala by S.D. Biju from the Tropical Botanic Garden and Research Institute in Palode, India, from the Vrije Universiteit Brussel (Free University of Brussels), in 2003. However, it was already well known to the local people and several earlier documented specimens and publications had been ignored by the authors in the 2003 paper that describes the genus and species. Its closest living relatives are considered to be frogs of the family Sooglossidae, only known in the Seychelles, an island chain in the Indian Ocean.

== Etymology ==
The scientific name Nasikabatrachus sahyadrensis is a Latinized portmanteau of the Sanskrit nāsikā (नासिका) for "nose", Greek batrachos (βάτραχος) for "frog", and Sahyadri, the native name for the Western Ghats which forms the purple frog's natural habitat.

One of its common names, the purple pig-nosed frog, also makes reference to the elongated morphology of its snout, which is well adapted to the acquisition of fossorial termites.

== Description ==
Video recording of a vocalizing male

The body of Nasikabatrachus sahyadrensis appears robust and bloated and is relatively rounded compared to other more dorsoventrally flattened frogs. Its flattened body assists it to cling to submerged rocks and boulders which essentially helps it to fight strong currents, allowing it to remain near stream banks where it typically lives. Its arms and legs splay out in the standard anuran body form. Compared to other frogs, N. sahyadrensis has a small head and an unusual pointed snout. Adults are typically dark purplish-grey in color. Males are about a third of the length of females. The specimen from which the species was originally described was 7.0 cm (2.8 inches) long from the tip of the snout to the vent. Tadpoles of the species had been described in 1917 by Nelson Annandale and C. R. Narayan Rao as having oral suckers that allowed them to live in torrential streams. Suckers are also present in rheophilic fishes of genera such as Glyptothorax, Travancoria, Homaloptera, and Bhavania, adaptations that are the result of convergent evolution. Some of these fishes co-occur with Nasikabatrachus tadpoles in the hill streams. Its vocalization is a drawn-out harsh call that sounds similar to a chicken clucking. Males of this species exhibit the unique behavior of calling from under a thin layer of soil. Some other burrowing frogs (Myobatrachus gouldii and Arenophyrne rotunda) are known to do this, but these frogs have also been observed to call from the surface, while N. sahyadrensis has not. N. sahyadrensis may switch to headfirst burrowing due to its wedge-shaped skull and other-shaped limbs.

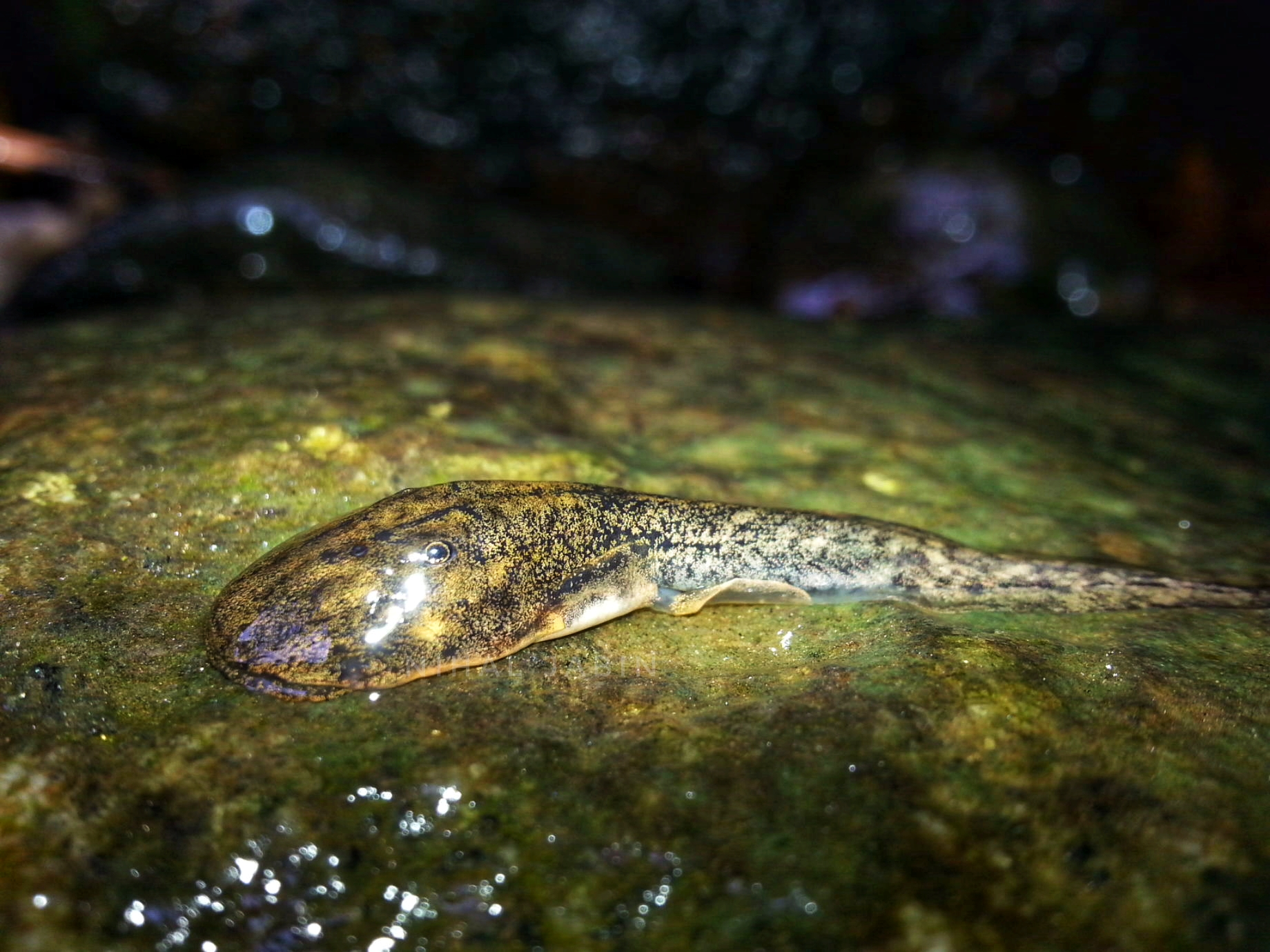
Purple frog tadpole

== Geographic range ==
Earlier thought to be restricted to the south of the Palghat Gap in the Western Ghats, additional records have extended the known range of Nasikabatrachus sahyadrensis farther north of the gap. The species is now known to be quite widely distributed in the Western Ghats, ranging from the Camel's Hump Hill Range in the north, all the way to the northernmost portions of the Agasthyamalai Hill Range in the south.

== Ecology ==
Like many frogs, the Indian purple frog is well-adapted to its subterranean environment. The frog spends most of its life underground and surfaces only during the monsoon, for a period of two weeks, for mating. With few field scientists out in the field during the rainy season, the species was discovered and studied only in recent times. Males emerge to call beside temporary rainwater streams. They mount females and grip them (amplexus) along the vertebral column. The females then carry the male frogs on their backs to the egg laying sites which are usually crevices along the fast-flowing streams. Around 3,000 eggs are laid and fertilized in a rock pool, and the tadpoles metamorphose after around 100 days.

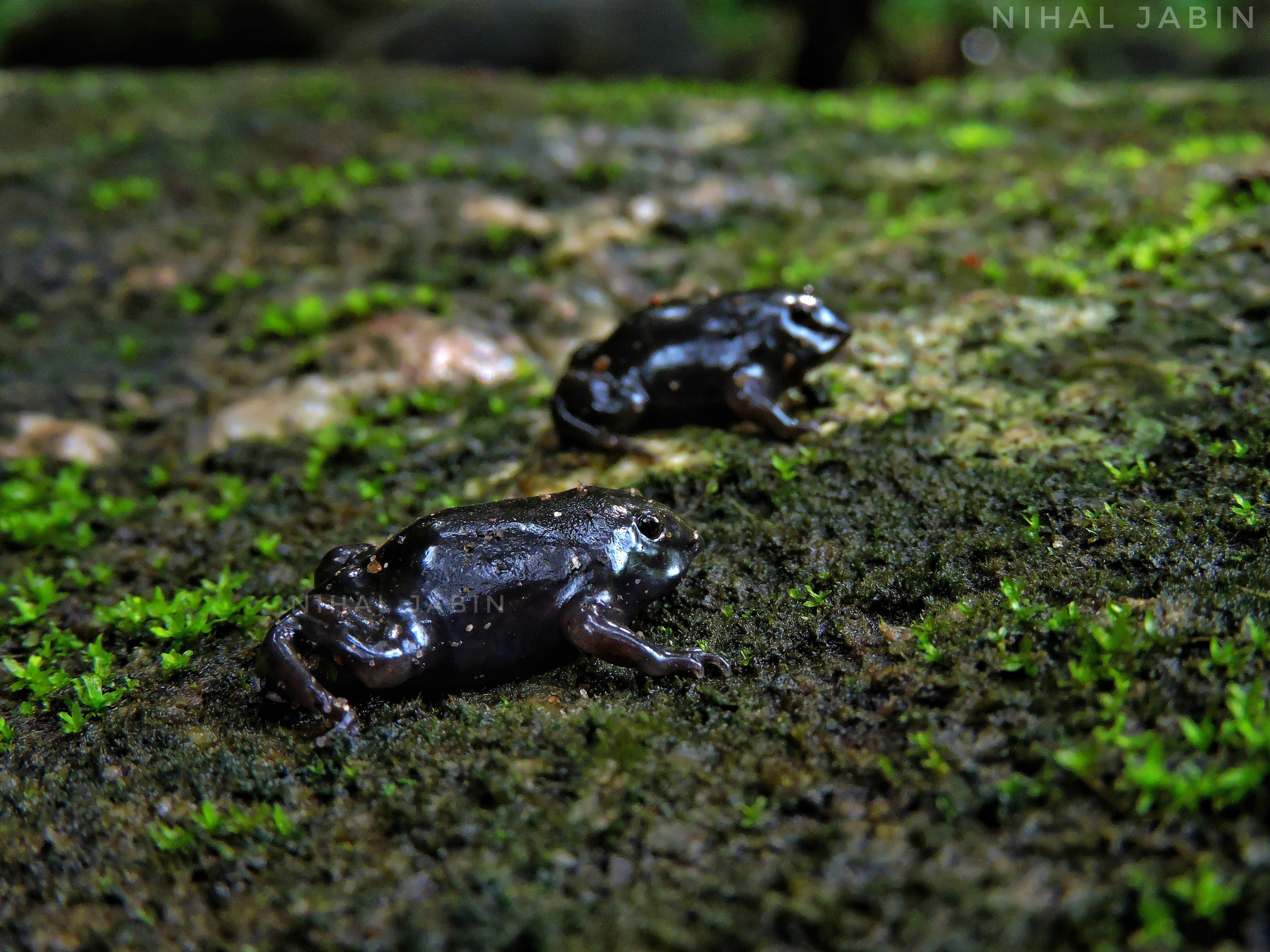
Purple frog juveniles

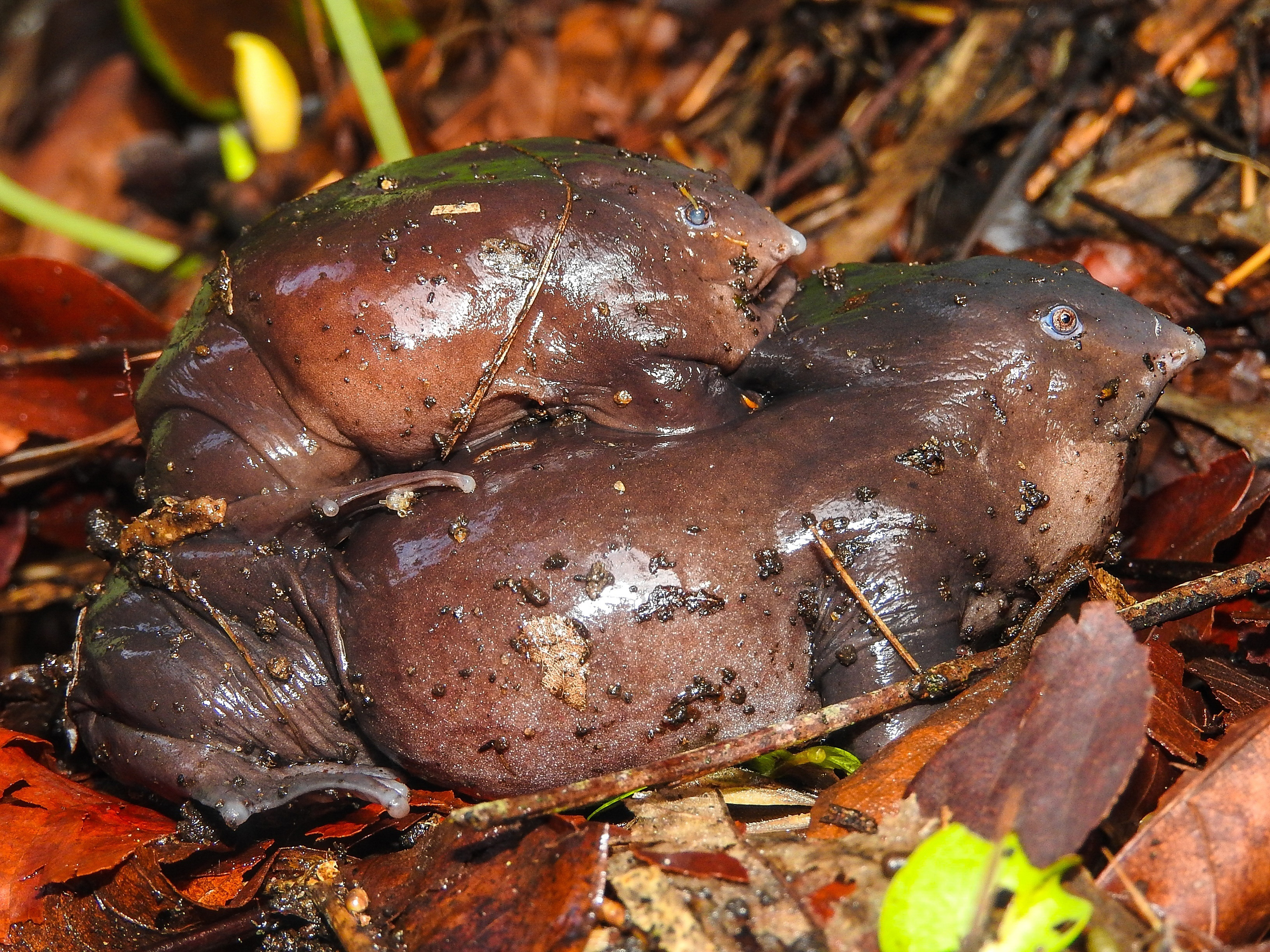
Purple frogs mating

Unlike many other burrowing species of frogs that emerge and feed above the ground, this species has been found to forage underground, feeding mainly on termites using its tongue and a special buccal groove.

In 2015, tadpoles of the species were discovered to be traditionally consumed by tribal communities.

The major threat to this amphibian in the Western Ghats of India is caused by the alteration of natural habitats by an ever-increasing human population, resulting in large areas being converted for settlement and agricultural use. Recent studies have shown frog utilization to be one of the major threats, which includes the utilization of frogs for food and traditional medicine such as a cure for burns, asthma, and other lung ailments. Research purposes and the pet trade have also been considered major contributors to their decline. Tadpole-harvesting was prevalent in the monsoon season during July–September every year. The Nadukani-Moolamattom-Kulamaav tribal people have developed an indigenous method for collecting these uniquely adapted suctorial tadpoles. Usually, about 2–5 people would participate in each harvesting event. The purple frog's growth also depends on the velocity of the water. When the velocity of water increased, there was a greater number of tadpoles than at lower velocity. The tadpoles also had constant activity in the streams as well. They also have a huge influence on the number of tadpoles in the environments they are in. Due to increasing population in India where the purple frogs are native, large open areas where purple frogs typically reside are being reconstructed for agricultural and settlement purposes. This has led to almost 40% of all amphibians in the Western Ghats of India going extinct. Due to a lack of data, the remaining amphibians are mostly unresearched with no knowledge of ecology, biology, defining characteristics, and threats faced.

The building of dams during monsoon season is affecting the loss of microhabitat that is needed for survival of the purple frog. The harvesting of tadpoles by indigenous communities also contributes to their endangerment.
