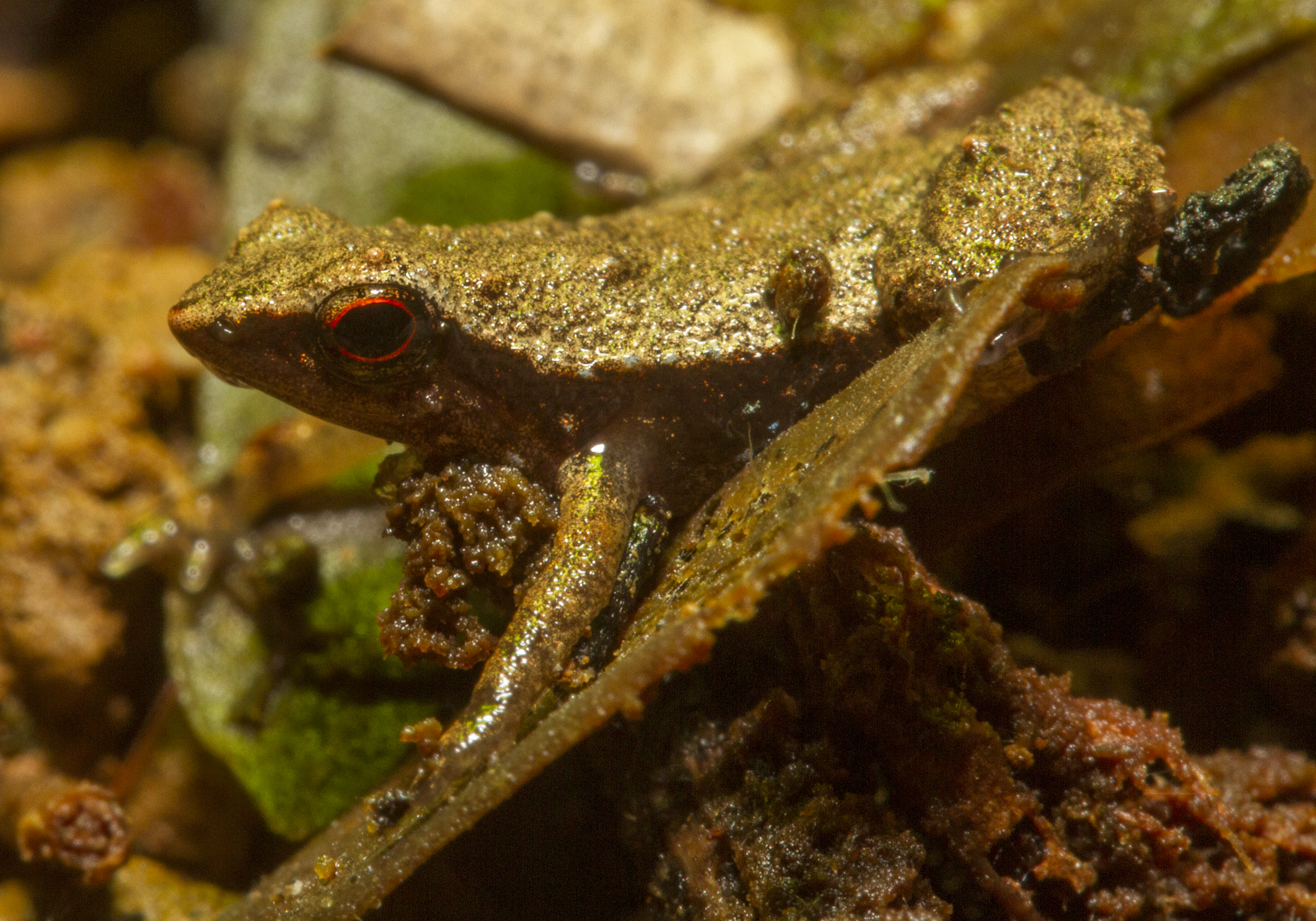
- Sechellophryne gardineri

Scientific classification
- Kingdom: Animalia
- Phylum: Chordata
- Class: Amphibia
- Order: Anura
- Superfamily: Sooglossoidea
- Family: Sooglossidae; Noble, 1931

Genera
- 2 genera (see text)

= Sooglossidae =

Seychelles frogs

Family of amphibians

Sooglossidae, the Seychelles frogs or Seychelles Island frogs, are a family of frogs found on the Seychelles Islands. Until recently, this family was believed to include the genera Sechellophryne, Nesomantis and Sooglossus, but following a major revision of amphibians in 2006, the genus Nesomantis was named a junior synonym of Sooglossus. Their closest relatives are the purple frogs (Nasikabatrachidae) of India.

== Description ==
All Sooglossidae species are relatively small terrestrial frogs, about 4 cm (1.6 in) in length, hiding under fallen leaves or in rock crevices. They are unusual for the neobatrachials, in that they undertake inguinal amplexus, a primitive version of amplexus. They lay their eggs on moist ground, rather than in water. Several species lack tadpoles, with the eggs hatching directly into froglets. The tadpoles of S. sechellensis are carried, abnormally, on the backs of the female frogs until metamorphosis.

There is no fossil record for the family. They diverged from the Nasikabatrachidae when the Seychelles Islands split from India during the Late Cretaceous. Their phylogenetic attributes are not fully understood but karyotypic studies demonstrate possible lineages from Madagascar due to pelobatid-leptodactyloid resemblances.

== Taxonomy ==
The family was first described in 1931 by Gladwyn Kingsley Noble (1894–1940) and contains the following two genera with four species in total:

- Genus Sechellophryne Nussbaum and Wu, 2007
  - Sechellophryne gardineri (Gardiner's Seychelles frog)
  - Sechellophryne pipilodryas (Seychelles palm frog)
- Genus Sooglossus Boulenger, 1906
  - Sooglossus sechellensis (Seychelles frog)
  - Sooglossus thomasseti (Thomasset's frog)

Genetic analysis indicates that some of the species that occur on multiple islands should actually be divided into multiple different lineages or evolutionarily significant units, and possibly even distinct species.
