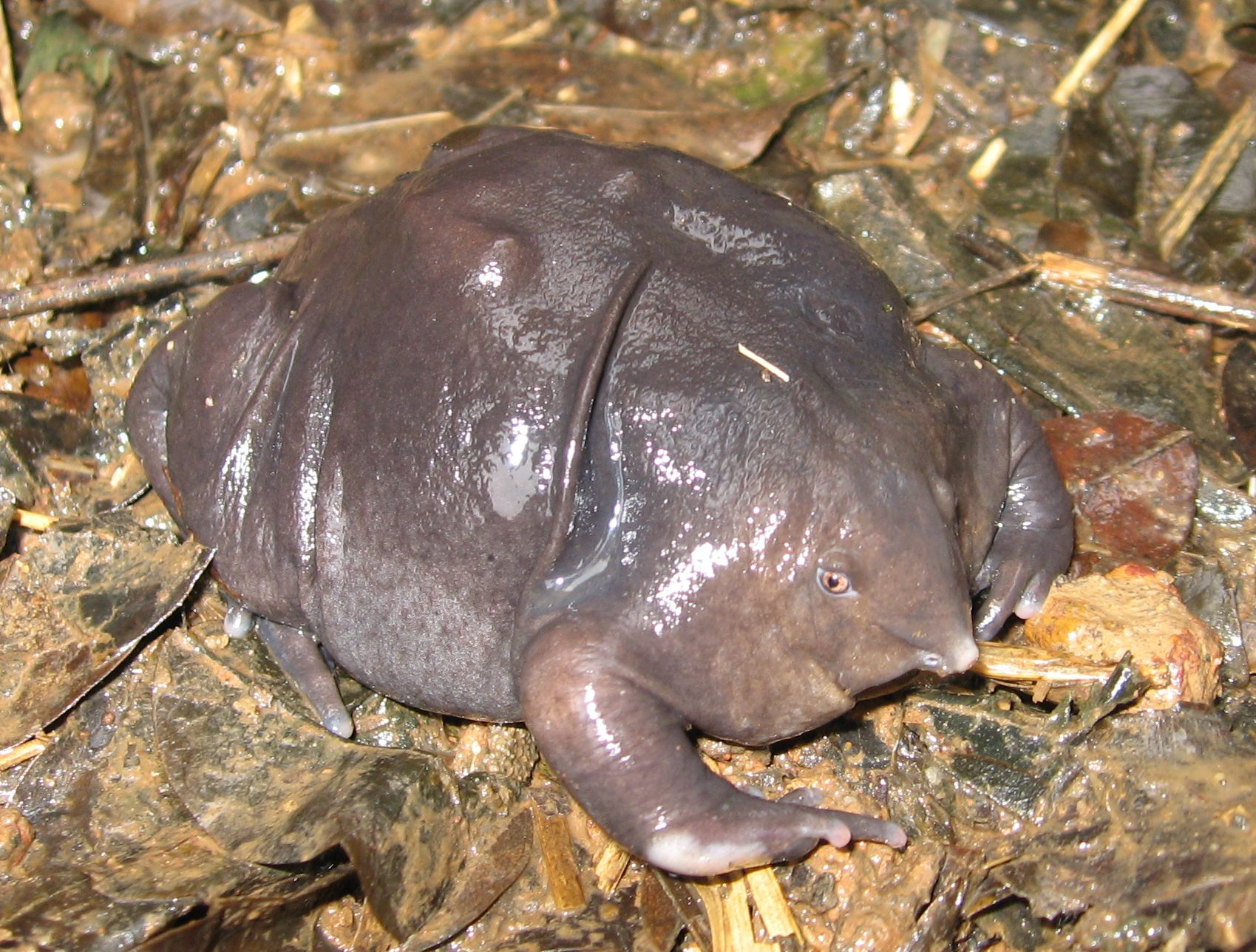
- Nasikabatrachus sahyadrensis

Scientific classification
- Kingdom: Animalia
- Phylum: Chordata
- Class: Amphibia
- Order: Anura
- Superfamily: Sooglossoidea
- Family: Nasikabatrachidae; Biju & Bossuyt, 2003
- Genus: Nasikabatrachus; Biju & Bossuyt, 2003

Species
- Nasikabatrachus bhupathi; Nasikabatrachus sahyadrensis

= Nasikabatrachus =

Genus of amphibians

Nasikabatrachus is a genus of frogs. It is presently treated as the only genus in the family Nasikabatrachidae, though previously it was included in the family Sooglossidae. Two species are recognized, Nasikabatrachus bhupathi and Nasikabatrachus sahyadrensis, both endemic to southwestern India. Both Nasikabatrachidae and Sooglossidae are thought to be the only extant families of the superfamily Sooglossoidea.

With its closest relatives in the Seychelles, Nasikabatrachus is thought to have evolved separately since the end of the Cretaceous. Its discovery added to the evidence that Madagascar and the Seychelles separated from the Indian landmass sometime well after the breakup of Gondwana had started.

== Reproduction ==
The purple frog is an explosive seasonal breeder species which completes its development in ephemeral streams. Its breeding activities typically take place during the months of April and May, which is during the pre-monsoon shower.
