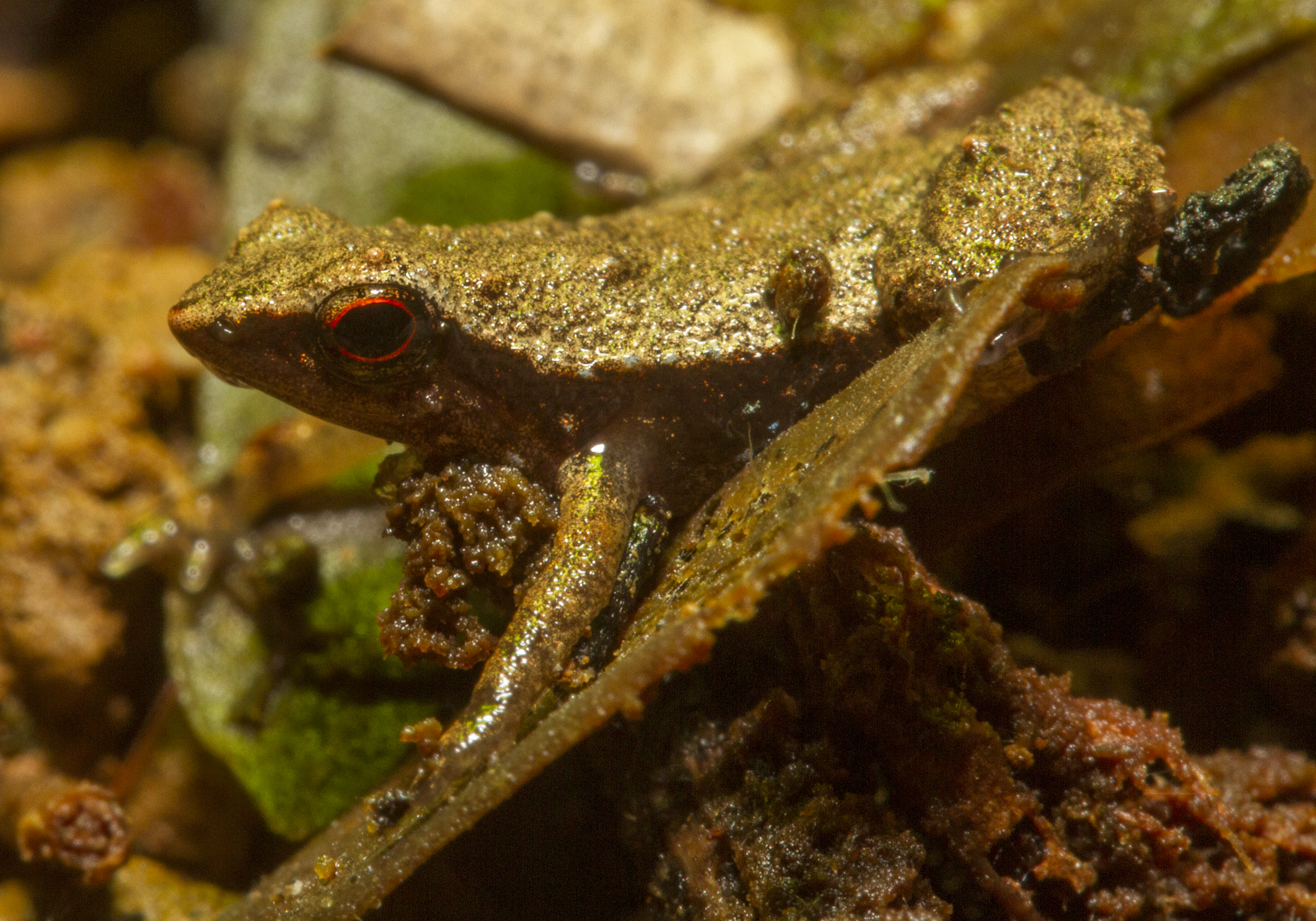

Conservation status
- Endangered (IUCN 3.1)

Scientific classification
- Kingdom: Animalia
- Phylum: Chordata
- Class: Amphibia
- Order: Anura
- Family: Sooglossidae
- Genus: Sechellophryne
- Species: S. gardineri

Binomial name
- Sechellophryne gardineri (Boulenger, 1911)

Synonyms
- Nectophryne gardineri Boulenger, 1911; Sooglossus gardineri (Boulenger, 1911); Leptosooglossus gardineri (Boulenger, 1911)

= Gardiner's Seychelles frog =

Gardiner's frog

Species of amphibian

Gardiner's Seychelles frog (Sechellophryne gardineri) is a small frog of the family Sooglossidae and endemic to the Seychelles. It is named after John Stanley Gardiner, English zoologist and oceanographer.

== Description ==
Gardiner's frog is one of the smallest frogs in the world, reaching a maximum length of 11 millimeters (0.43 inches). Newly hatched frogs measure 3 millimeters (0.12 inches) in length. Adult males are 8 millimeters (0.31 inches) long. It is brown in color, and has a dark stripe running from its mouth to its legs.

This frog is notable for its ability to hear despite the absence of a middle ear cavity. Research has shown that the species is able to use its mouth cavity to amplify sound and transmit it to the inner ear, as explained by co-author Jean-François Aubry.

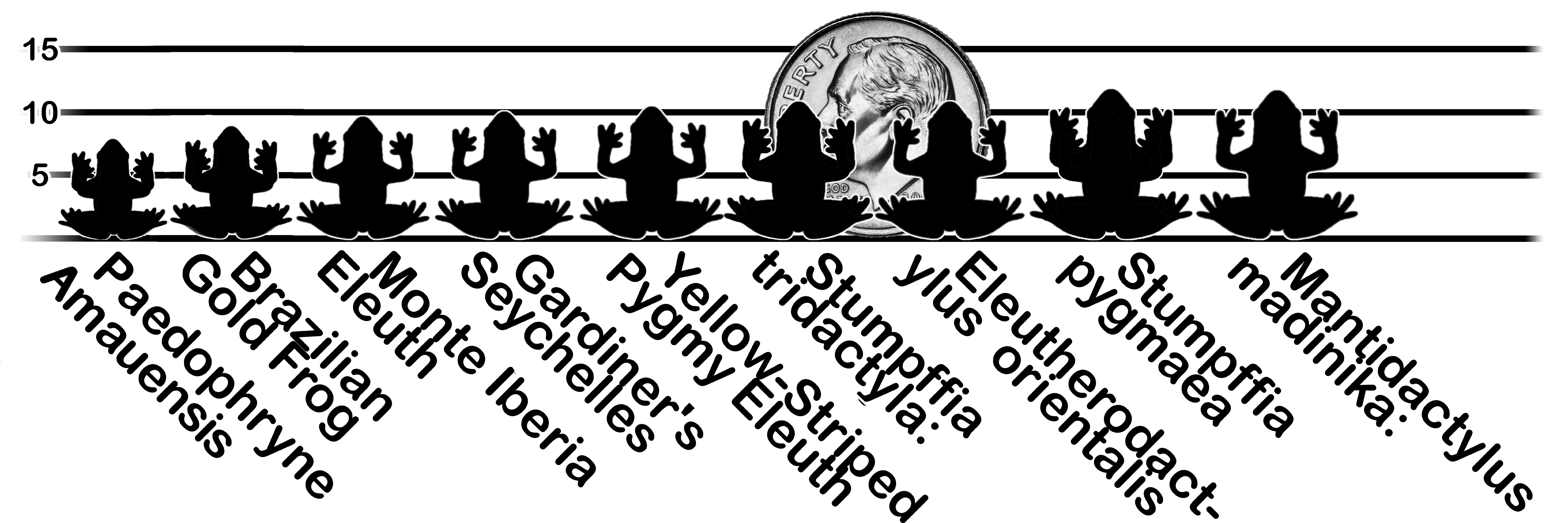
A relative comparison of the world's smallest frogs

== Ecology and behavior ==
Gardiner's frog is a terrestrial frog, feeding on small invertebrates including mites, sciarid larvae, ants, and amphipods. It is restricted to the high- and mid-altitude areas of Mahé and Silhouette Islands of the Seychelles group. This is unusual among the Sooglossidae, as most are restricted to the high altitudes, which have a stable climate due to constant mist. Eggs are laid in small clumps on moist ground and hatch as fully formed small adult frogs. Although Gardiner's frog is common at many sites, it is classified as endangered by the IUCN Red List because it is restricted to only three locations representing five subpopulations.

== Taxonomy ==
Genetic analysis indicates that the two populations of this species are distinct from each other and are possibly even separate species. It has thus been proposed that both populations be considered evolutionary significant units for conservation purposes.
