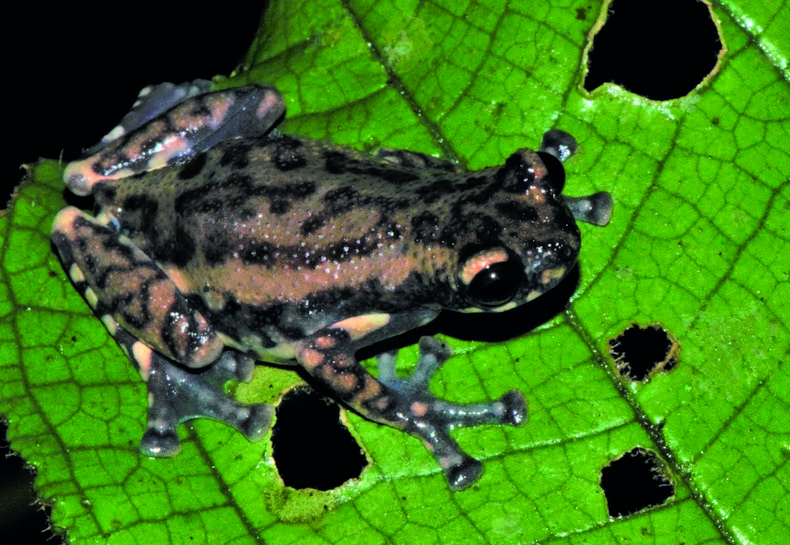
- Allophryne ruthveni. Amapá, Brazil

Scientific classification
- Kingdom: Animalia
- Phylum: Chordata
- Class: Amphibia
- Order: Anura
- Suborder: Neobatrachia
- Superfamily: Hyloidea
- Family: Allophrynidae; Savage, 1973
- Genus: Allophryne; Gaige, 1926

Species
- Allophryne ruthveni Gaige, 1926; Allophryne relicta Caramaschi, Orrico, Faivovich, Dias, and Solé, 2013; Allophryne resplendens Castroviejo-Fisher, Pérez-Peña, Padial, and Guayasamin, 2012
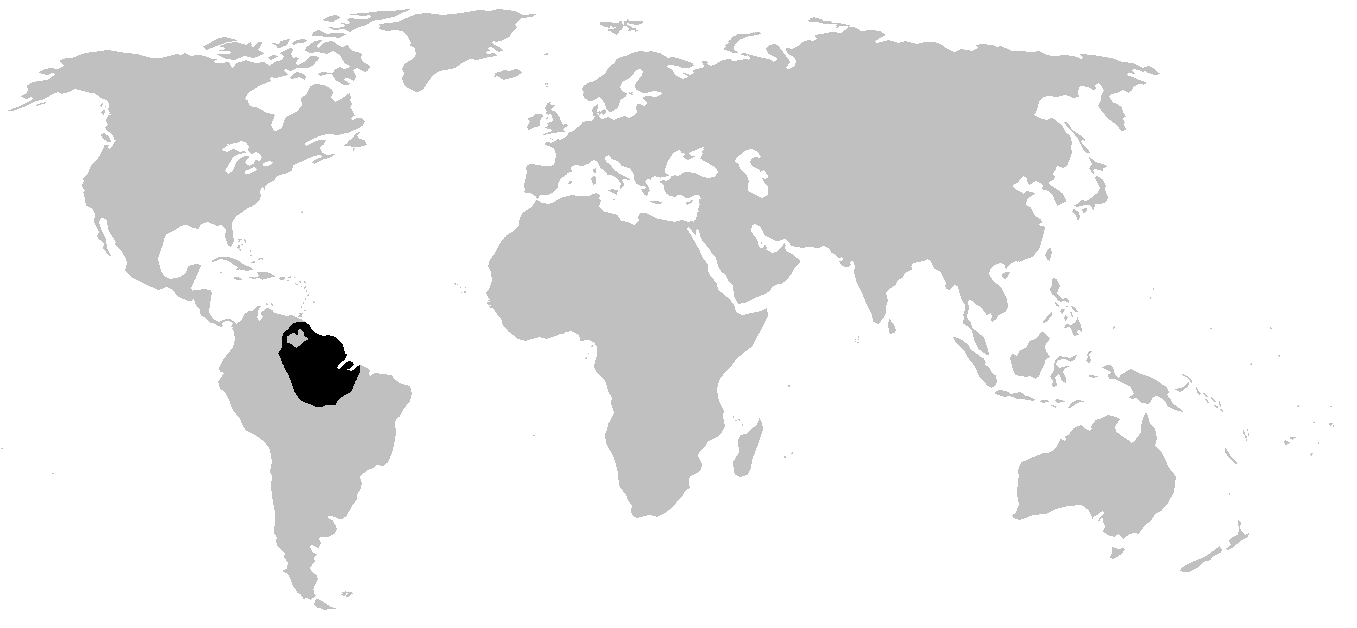
- Distribution of A. ruthveni (in black)

= Tukeit Hill frog =

Tukeit Hill frogs

Genus of amphibians

The Tukeit Hill frogs are three species of frog in the genus Allophryne. Originally erected for the species Allophryne ruthveni, the genus was placed as the only member of the subfamily Allophryninae, which was in turn placed in the family Centrolenidae, but they are now considered as the only genus in the monotypic family Allophrynidae.

These frogs live in Guyana, Venezuela, Suriname, Brazil and Bolivia. The holotype was discovered at Tukeit Hill, below Kaieteur Falls, Guyana, hence the common English name.

== Description ==
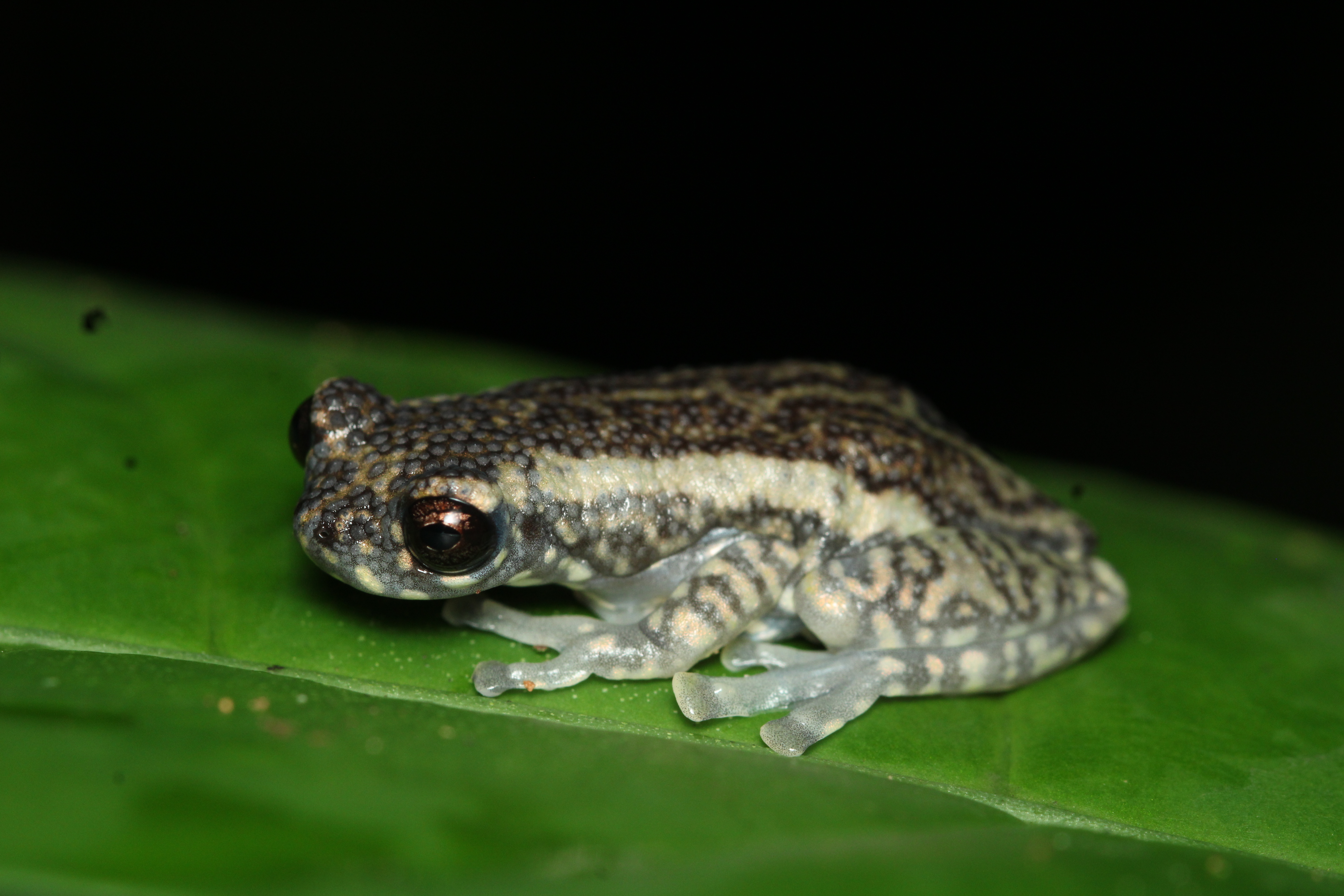
Allophryne ruthveni

The Tukeit Hill frog is a small frog of variable colouration, either black, with stripes and spots which can be golden or dull yellow, or a dull yellow or golden ventral surface, with black strips and spots. It has a flat body, and small, flat head. It has a single, submandibular vocal sac. The toe pads are enlarged, wider than the fingers, and the tympanum is visible.

The Tukeit Hill frog is superficially similar to the tree frogs, but the ends of their phalanges differ in shape.

== Taxonomy ==
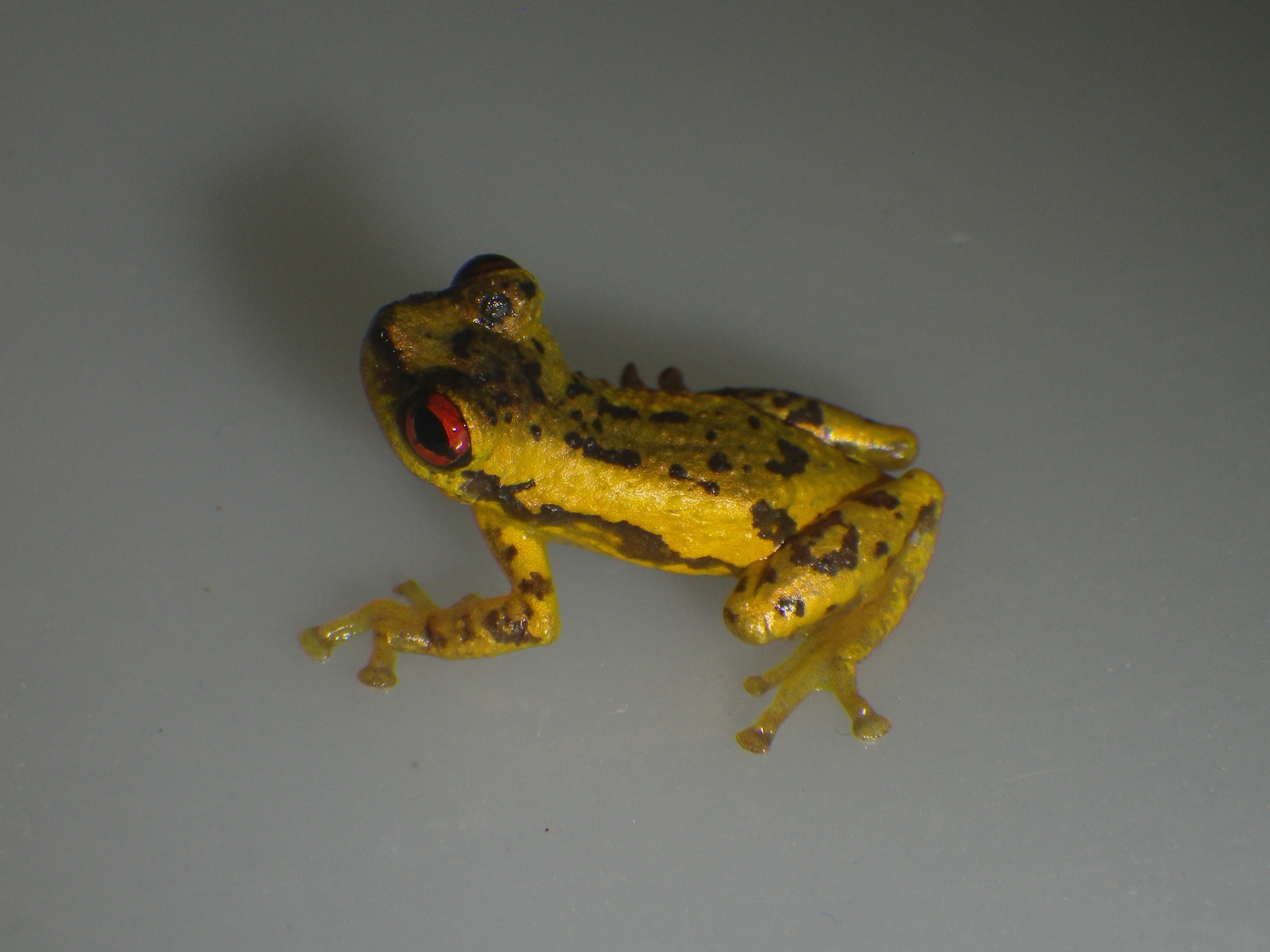
Allophryne relicta

Allophryne ruthveni is part of a hitherto (see below) monotypic subfamily of anurans: Allophryninae. The evolutionary relationships of this species have always been controversial. It has been joined to families such as Hylidae, Bufonidae, and Leptodactylidae, but until recently, its closer relatives were unknown.

Allophryne is similar in its general shape to tree frogs of the family Hylidae, but differs by having the last phalanges of fingers and toes T-shaped, a character found in glassfrogs, while tree frogs have claw-shaped ones. When herpetologist G. K. Noble examined Allophryne, he suggested it was closely related to glassfrogs, a hypothesis later confirmed by recent phylogenetic studies, which have found Allophryne is the sister taxon of the glassfrog clade Centroleninae.

The glassfrogs differ from Allophryne by having much more delicate skulls and by possessing intercalary elements between the last phalanges of fingers, a process on the third metacarpal, and nonexplosive breeding, among other characteristics. Both glassfrogs and the Allophrynidae are closely related to Leptodactylidae.

Recently, an undescribed species of frog, which probably belongs to the genus Allophryne, was discovered in Peru . This suggests the genus is actually more widespread and more species await discovery. As A. ruthveni was assumed to be a northwestern Amazonian endemic, the Peruvian frog indicates the Allophrynidae might have been more widespread in prehistoric times, only later on disappearing from most of the Amazon Basin, and are actually a relict group. Alternatively, they might occur in the western Amazonas lowlands and simply have not been found yet, though this seems less likely.

== Behaviour ==
The Tukeit Hill frog is semiarboreal, spending some times low in the trees, 1–3 m high, and some of the time on the ground. They are explosive breeders, taking advantage of small water ponds formed on the forest floor after periods of rain. This frog inhabits sparse forest, and may be restricted to forested areas, avoiding cleared land.
