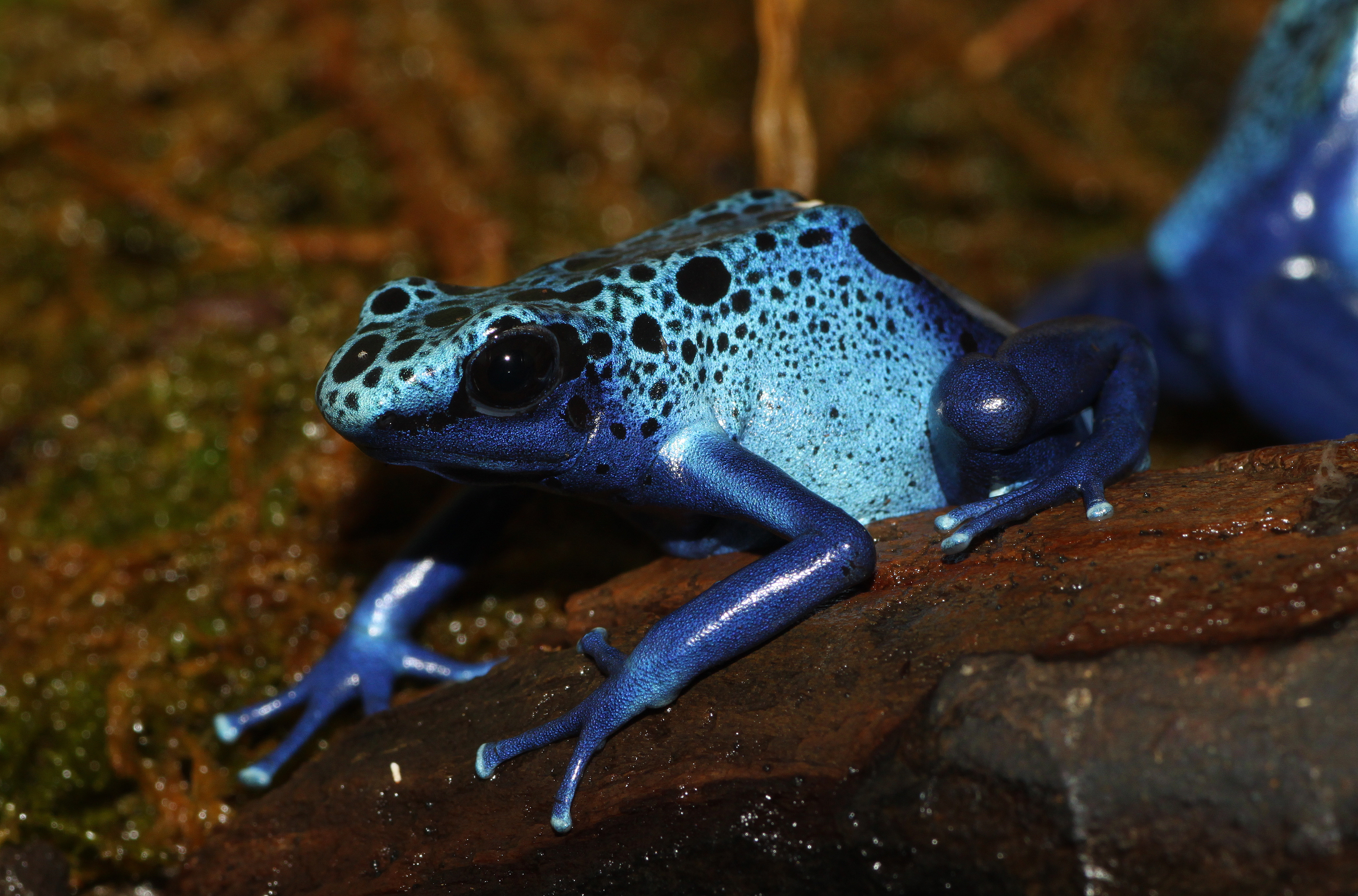
- Dendrobates tinctorius "azureus"

Scientific classification
- Kingdom: Animalia
- Phylum: Chordata
- Class: Amphibia
- Order: Anura
- Superfamily: Dendrobatoidea; Cope, 1865

Families
- See text

= Dendrobatoidea =

Superfamily of amphibians

The Dendrobatoidea are a superfamily of frogs. This group is found in the Neotropics and has the largest diversity of alkaloids among all amphibians. These alkaloids show up in the skin by one of three ways: de novo biosynthesis, direct sequestration, or metabolic transformation.

== Taxonomy ==
Families:

- Aromobatidae (Grant et al., 2006)
- Dendrobatidae (Cope, 1865)
