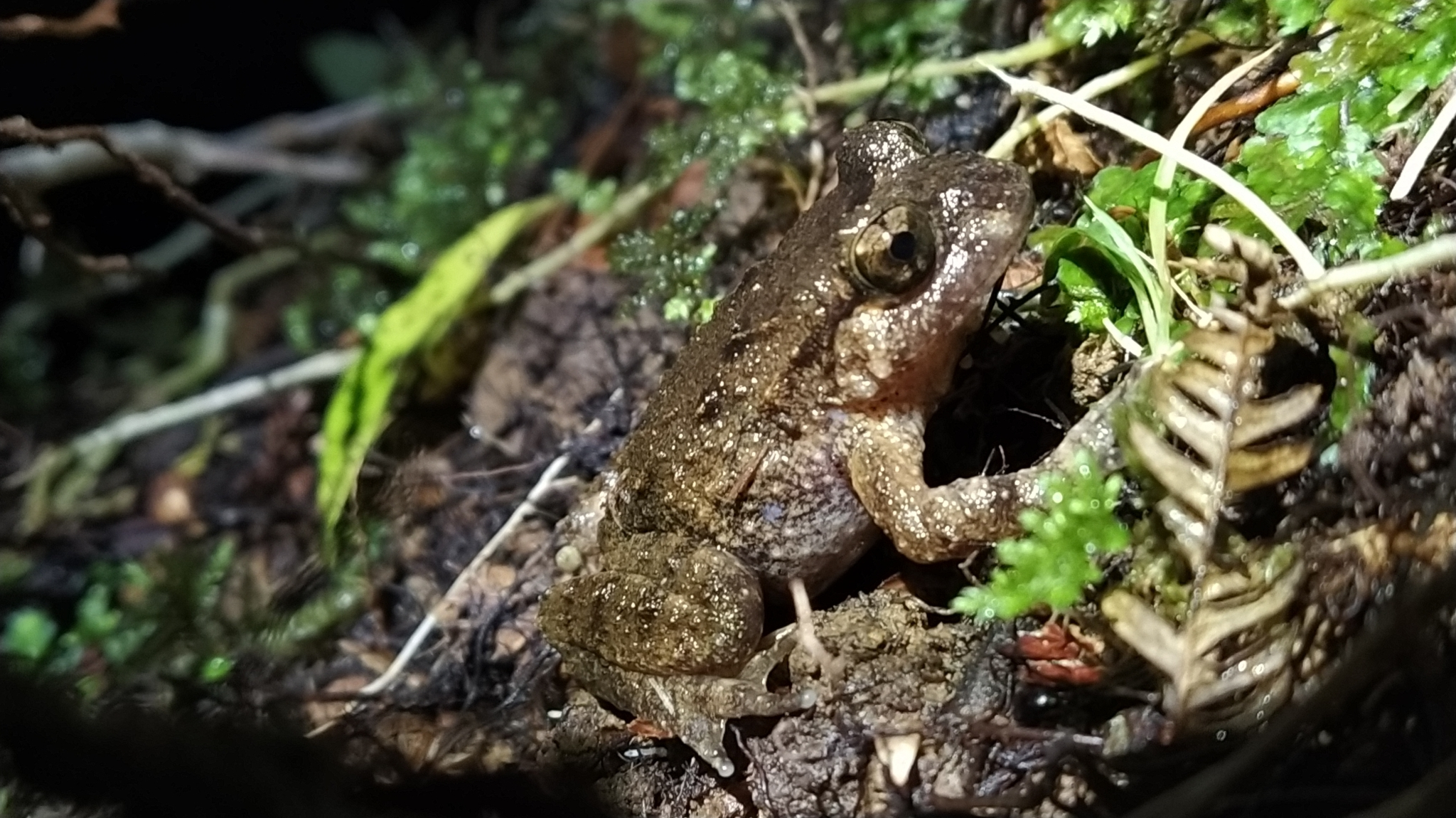

Conservation status
- Declining (NZ TCS)

- Least Concern (IUCN 3.1)

Scientific classification
- Kingdom: Animalia
- Phylum: Chordata
- Class: Amphibia
- Order: Anura
- Family: Leiopelmatidae
- Genus: Leiopelma
- Species: L. hochstetteri

Binomial name
- Leiopelma hochstetteri Fitzinger, 1861
- The distribution of Hochstetter's frog on the North Island map

= Hochstetter's frog =

Species of amphibian

Hochstetter's frog or Hochstetter's New Zealand frog (Leiopelma hochstetteri) is a primitive frog native to New Zealand, one of only three extant species belonging to the taxonomic family Leiopelmatidae. They possess some of the most ancient features of any extant frogs in the world.

== Taxonomy ==
Hochstetter's frog is named after the Austrian geologist Ferdinand von Hochstetter. This species is endemic to New Zealand and belongs to the most primitive anuran suborder Archaeobatrachia, along with Archey's frog (Leiopelma archeyi), Hamilton's frog (L. hamiltoni), and the Maud Island frog (L. pakeka). Three species within the genus, L. auroraensis, L. markhami, and L. waitomoensis, are extinct.

== Description ==
Hochstetter's frog has a brown-green to brown-red top with dark bands and warts, yellow-brown bellies. Males grow to 38 mm (1.5 in) and females 50 mm (2.0 in) snout–vent length. They are nocturnal, staying under refugia during the day. Hochstetter's frog prefers moist gaps under shaded debris, like rocks and logs and along streams and seepages in native temperate rainforest. They are carnivorous, preying on invertebrates such as spiders, beetles, and mites. All native New Zealand frogs (pepeketua in Māori) share tail-wagging muscles, inscriptional ribs, round pupils, and a lack of eardrums, eustachian tubes, and vocal sacs. These frogs, in some ways more similar to salamanders than modern frogs, use chemical signals over acoustic signals to mark habitat and recognize competitors. Hochstetter's frogs poor hearing is complemented by their lack of vocalization.

== Lifecycle ==
Hochstetter's frogs can live to 30 years old. Adults do not breed until they are three years old, laying up to 20 eggs each season. While all four species develop as tadpoles inside the egg, hatching as froglets with developed back legs, Hochstetter's frogs, as the only semiaquatic species, continue to develop in water while the two other species are cared for by their parents.

== Distribution ==
Subfossil remains indicate all native species were once widespread across New Zealand until roughly 200 years ago. Hochstetter's frogs have the most extensive distribution of the native frogs, spanning the upper North Island, including the Waitākere and Hunua Ranges, the Coromandel Peninsula, Great Barrier Island, Maungatautari Ecological Island, and the East Coast. Ten populations of this species have been found to be genetically distinct, owing to the history of glacial isolation.

Currently the species survives in fragmented populations across the North Island between Whangārei and the Waikato Region, and can also be found on Great Barrier Island.

== Threats ==
Invasive species like rats, goats, and pigs have caused declines in the species' population. The kiore, or Polynesian rat, was brought to New Zealand by the Māori, causing extinction on the South Island and large-scale destruction of populations on the North Island during the last millennium. Rats and stoats are known to kill Hochstetter's frogs. Predators known to predate other frog species in New Zealand, such as pigs, cats, hedgehogs and ferrets, are also likely to have an impact. Introduced browsers, such as goats and pigs, have been thought erode habitat along streams and reduce the amount of vegetation providing shade. Habitat modification and destruction has been paramount in reducing populations. Local mining can cause sediment runoff that reduces stream quality and can even poison frogs. Logging and the resulting forest clearing can pose similar issues to stream quality. The global chytrid fungus epidemic has caused steep declines in Archey's frog populations and is thought to pose a threat to Hochstetter's frogs, as well.

== Conservation ==
Under the New Zealand Threat Classification scheme, Hochsetter's frog is listed as "At risk–Declining". The IUCN has classified the species as "Least Concern". All native frogs are protected under the New Zealand Wildlife Management Act of 1953. The Kokako Management Area in the northern Hunua Ranges has been undergoing pest control since 1994 to provide suitable habitat for the conservation of kokako, an endangered forest bird. Surveys of Hochstetter's frogs in the area have shown numbers of young frogs have jumped from 10% to 30% in 2005.
