= List of amphibians of New Zealand =

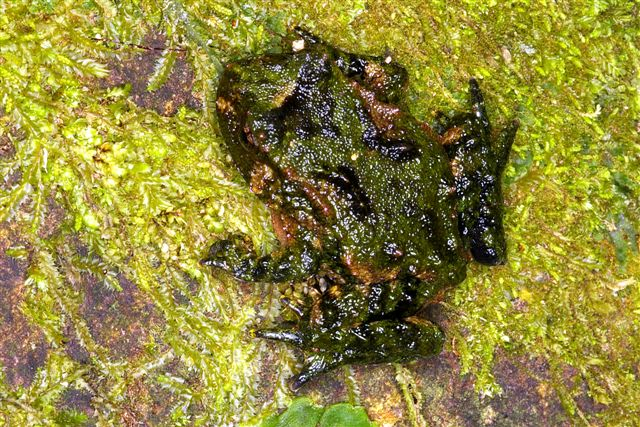
Hochstetter's frog (Leiopelma hochstetteri).

All of the amphibians of New Zealand are either from the endemic genus Leiopelma or are one of the introduced species, of which three are extant. Pepeketua is the eponymized Māori word.

== Unique characteristics ==
Members of the genus Leiopelma exhibit a number of basal traits that separate them from most other species. These traits include: vestigial tail-wagging muscles, cartilaginous inscriptional ribs, the presence of amphicoelous vertebrae, and nine presachral vertebrae (most frogs have eight). In addition, Leiopelma lack external ear drums and produce only limited vocalizations.

== Species ==
=== Native ===
Scientific name	Common name	Image
Leiopelma archeyi	Archey's frog	
Leiopelma hamiltoni	Hamilton's frog	
Leiopelma hochstetteri	Hochstetter's frog	
Leiopelma auroraensis	Aurora frog	EX
Leiopelma markhami	Markham's frog	EX
Leiopelma waitomoensis	Waitomo frog	EX

=== Introduced ===
Scientific name	Common name	Image
Ranoidea aurea	Green and golden bell frog	
Ranoidea raniformis	Growling grass frog	
Litoria ewingii	Southern brown tree frog	

== See also ==
- Environment of New Zealand
- Conservation in New Zealand
- Fauna of New Zealand
