= Amplexus =

Type of mating behavior exhibited by some externally fertilizing species

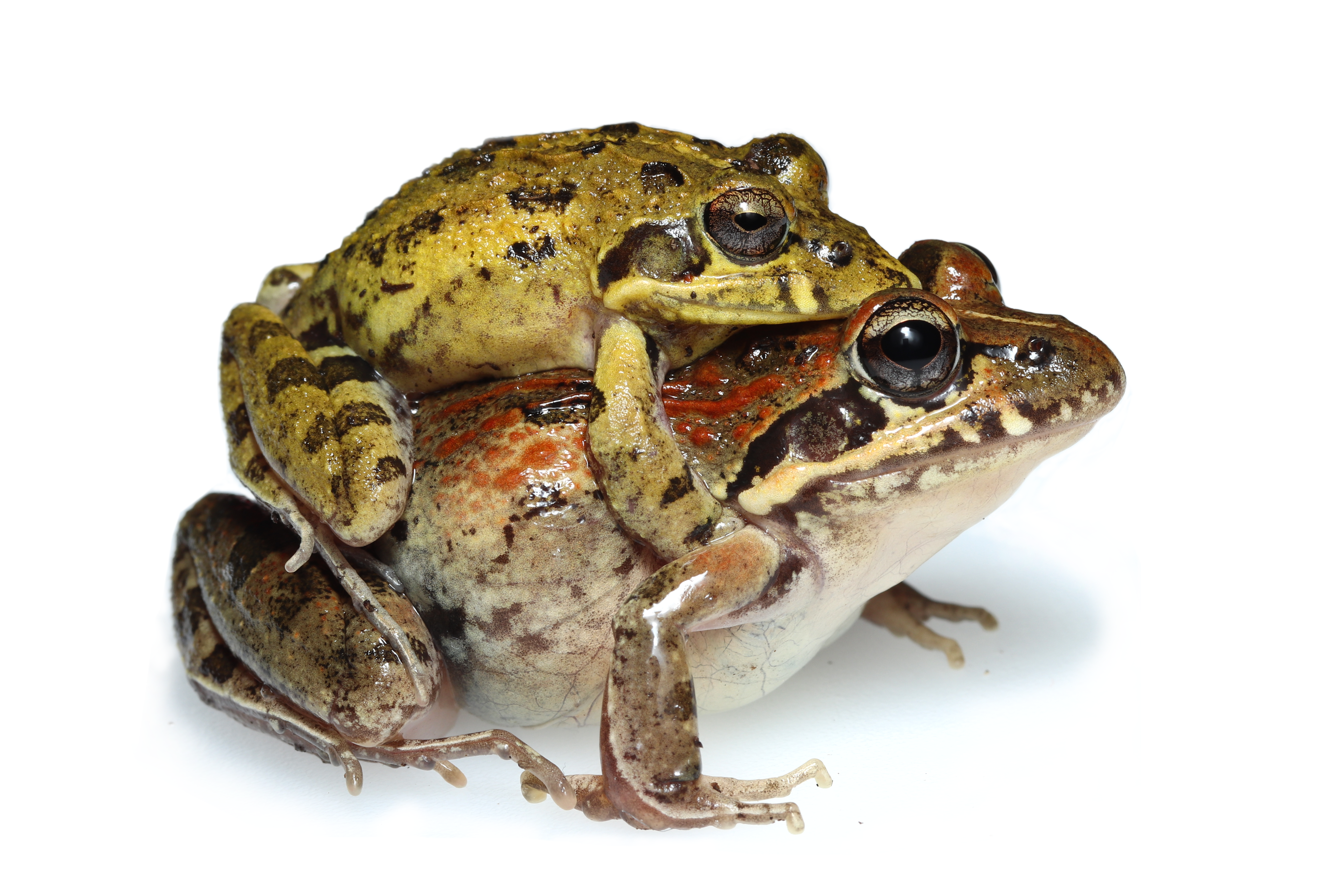
A pair of clicking stream frogs (Strongylopus grayii) in amplexus

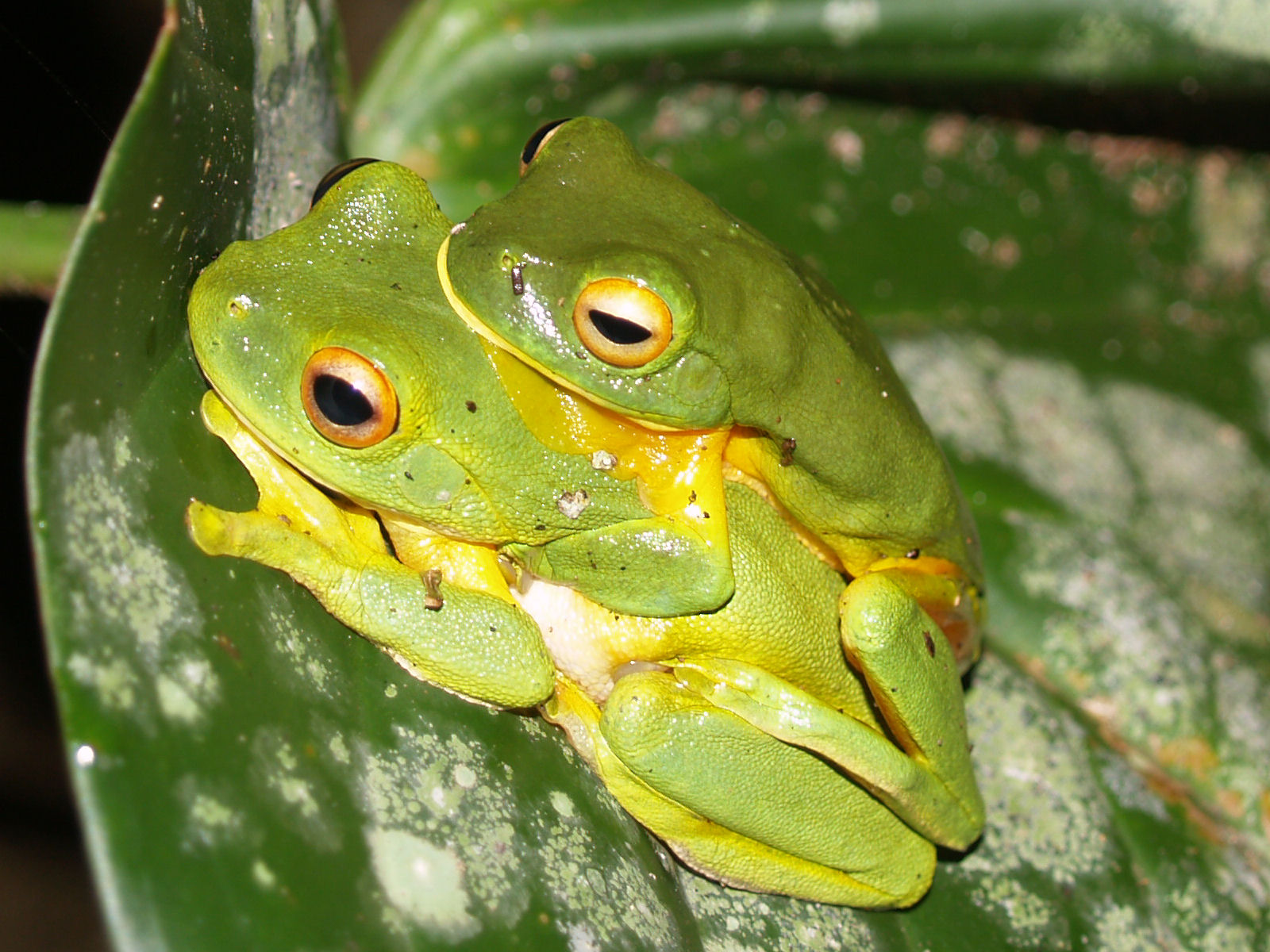
Orange-thighed frogs (Litoria xanthomera) in amplexus

Amplexus (Latin "embrace") is a type of mating behavior exhibited by some externally fertilizing species (chiefly amphibians, amphipods, and horseshoe crabs) in which a male grasps a female with his front legs as part of the mating process, and at the same time or with some time delay, he fertilizes the eggs, as they are released from the female's body. In amphibians, females may be grasped by the head, waist, or armpits, and the type of amplexus is characteristic of some taxonomic groups.

Amplexus involves direct contact between male and female, distinguished from other forms of external fertilization, such as broadcast spawning, where sperm and eggs are freely shed into water without direct contact by individuals. In order for amplexus to be initiated, male frogs must first find a mate by attracting one through calls, typically in the evening. Once a male has successfully attracted a mate, the process of amplexus begins, while the unsuccessful males are forced to continue their search for a mate through further calls.

The competition for a female mate among males is considered intense, and it is not uncommon for a male amphibian to attack an already-amplexed pair of amphibians. When a male amphibian attacks an amplexed pair of amphibians, he is trying to force the other male to release its grasp of the female, so he can then mate with her. Male amphibians are also known to show mate-guarding behaviour after amplexus in an attempt to prevent the female from mating with other males.

The duration of amplexus has been found to vary across species. In some species it may last for many days, while in others it may last a few hours. Despite the variation in the duration of amplexus across species, typically all species that exhibit this behaviour have to use their forelimb muscles for the duration of amplexus. Studies have found that this reproductive behaviour of amplexus can come with different fitness costs, because amplexus can occur for prolonged periods. For instance, a study found that when a male amphibian is grasping and holding onto a female amphibian, this can lead to the impairment of the female's ability to move or to feed. After conducting experiments, researchers confirmed that amplexus does decrease a female's locomotor performance (e.g., swimming, walking) as well as feeding rates. With regard to the cost to the male engaged in amplexus, male amphibians have been found to not feed at all during amplexus.

== Types ==
Many types of amplexus are identified in the literature. However, two types of amplexus are more common than others, known as inguinal and axillary amplexus. These two types of amplexus have been classified based on the position of the male amphibian relative to the female. When a male amphibian clasps a female around her waist (inguinal region) using his forelimbs, this is considered inguinal amplexus. By contrast, when a male amphibian clasps behind the forelimbs (axillary region) of the female, this is considered axillary amplexus.

== Physiological and hormonal function ==
=== Physiology ===
Amplexus has been found to involve different muscles in both male and female amphibians. The forelimb muscles in both males and females have been identified as the key muscles for amplexus that most species use. These forelimb muscles that are used during amplexus are typically larger in males than females, and for males these muscles contain more oxidative fibers, which could mean that amplexus involves an increased rate of aerobic metabolism. In addition to those forelimb muscles being larger in males, male frogs also typically have keratin pads or nuptial pads, which are located on their thumbs and contribute to the success of amplexus by assisting in gripping the female for the duration of amplexus. This amplexus behaviour allows the amphibians' cloacae to be in close contact, while gametes are released. Additionally, amplexus is thought to help with the alignment of the reproductive tracts of both males and females, which furthermore contributes to successful fertilization. A female amphibian may not always be receptive to a male amphibian who is trying to initiate amplexus, as the female may not be ready to produce eggs. When the female is not ready to engage in amplexus, she will simply vibrate her body, which will then be felt by the male who is clasped to her and he will then stop the amplexus behaviour.

=== Hormones ===
Two major hormones have been identified to be involved in amplexus. The hormone arginine vasotocin (AVT) has been identified as having an effect on the calling behaviours produced by these male amphibians when searching for a female mate, as AVT increased the amount of calling behaviour produced in male amphibians. Additionally, it is believed that the gonadotropin-releasing hormone (GnRH) has an influence on amplexus in amphibians, as it has been found to produce or initiate this behaviour in many anuran amphibians. Furthermore, both arginine vasotocin and gonadotropin-releasing hormone have been found to be involved in the sexual behaviour of male amphibians. The stress hormone corticosterone has also been identified as associated with the sexual behaviour of amplexus. A study conducted on red-spotted newts found an acute increase in corticosterone for both males and females who were engaged in the behaviour of amplexus. However, overall it was found that males have a higher level of corticosterone compared to females, as amplexus is seen as more energetically costly to males. The increase in corticosterone found in females could be attributed to amplexus preventing them from foraging for food.

== Amphibians ==
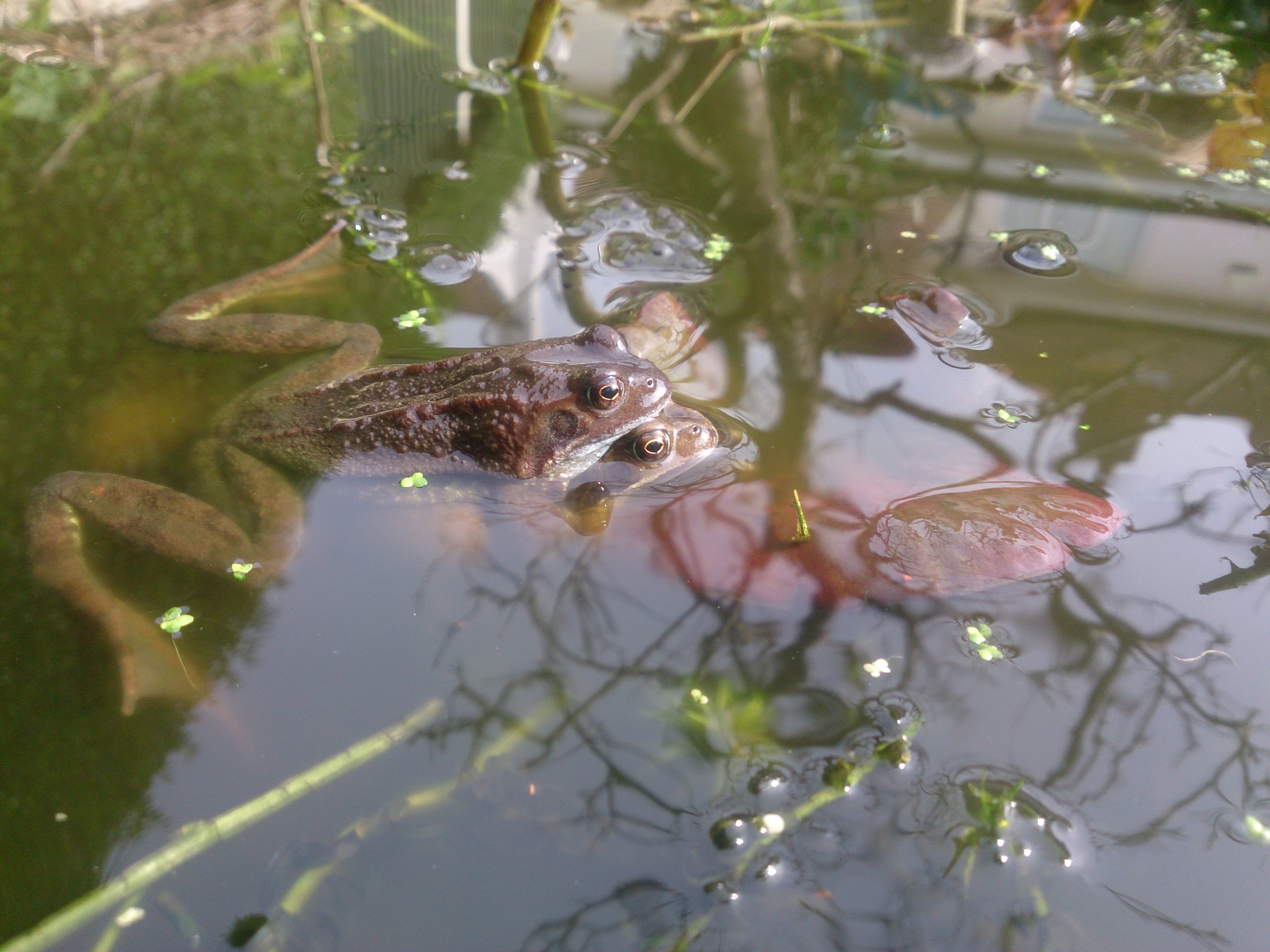
European common frog

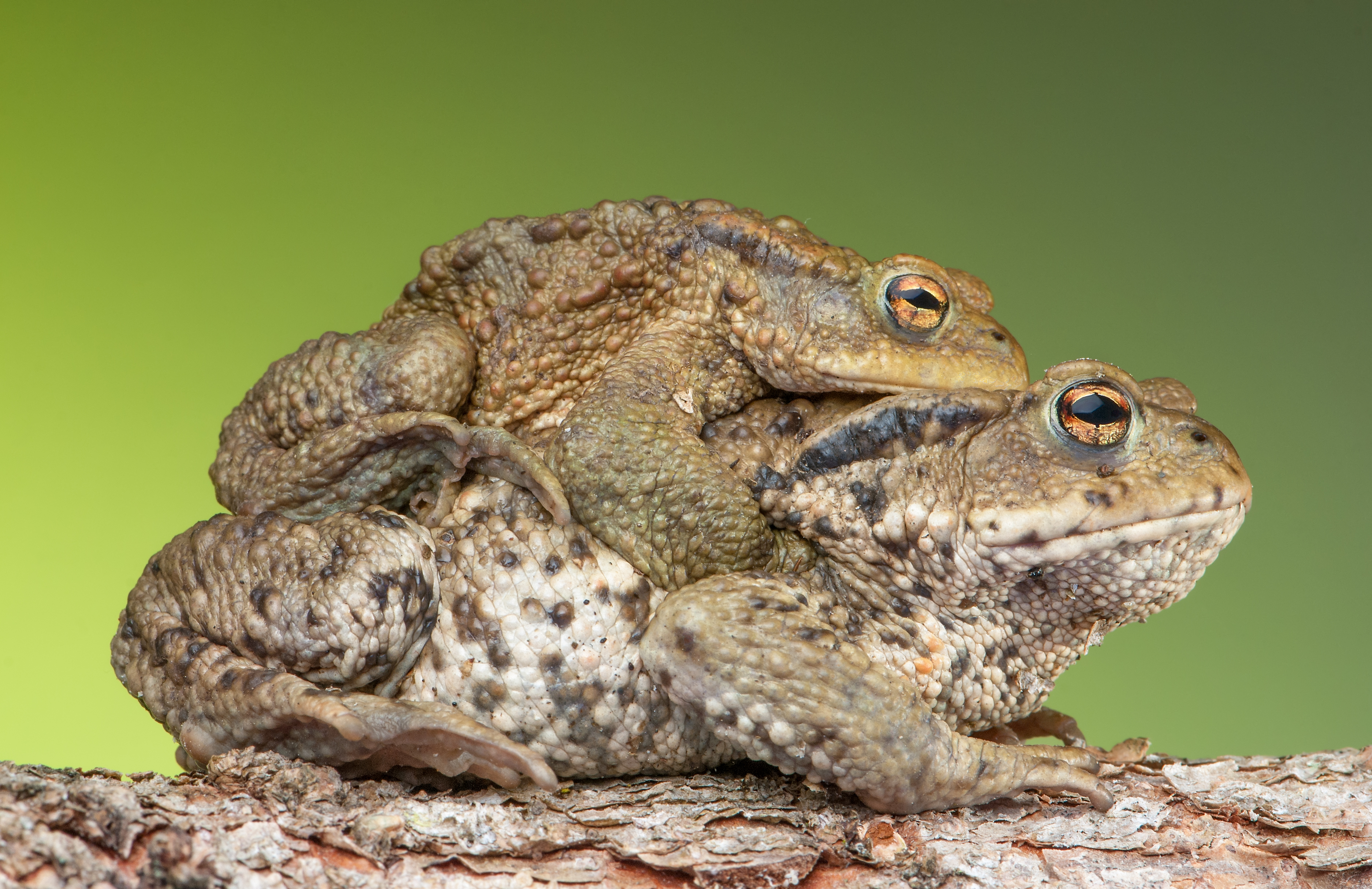
European common toad (Bufo bufo).

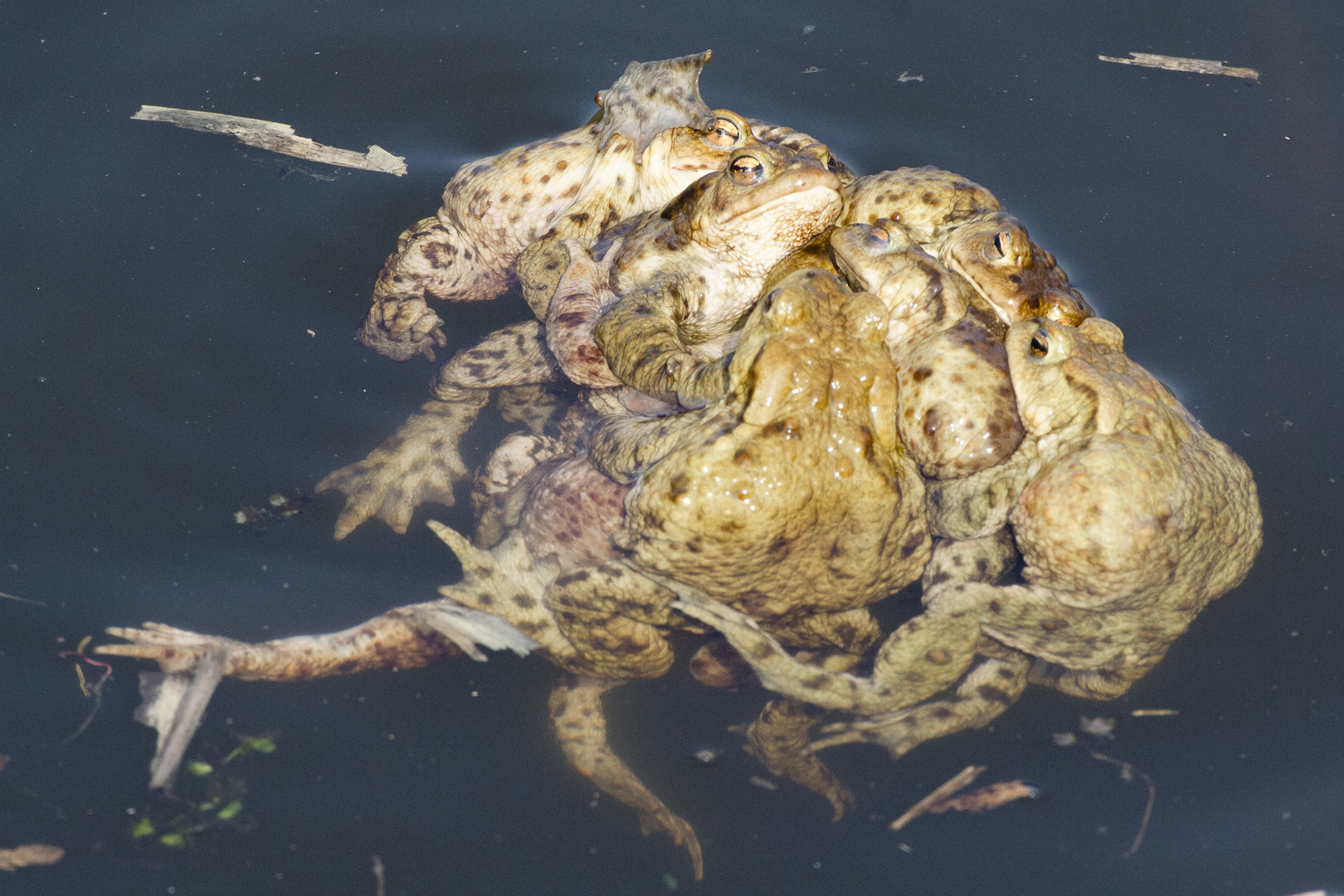
Common toad mating ball (multiple amplexus).

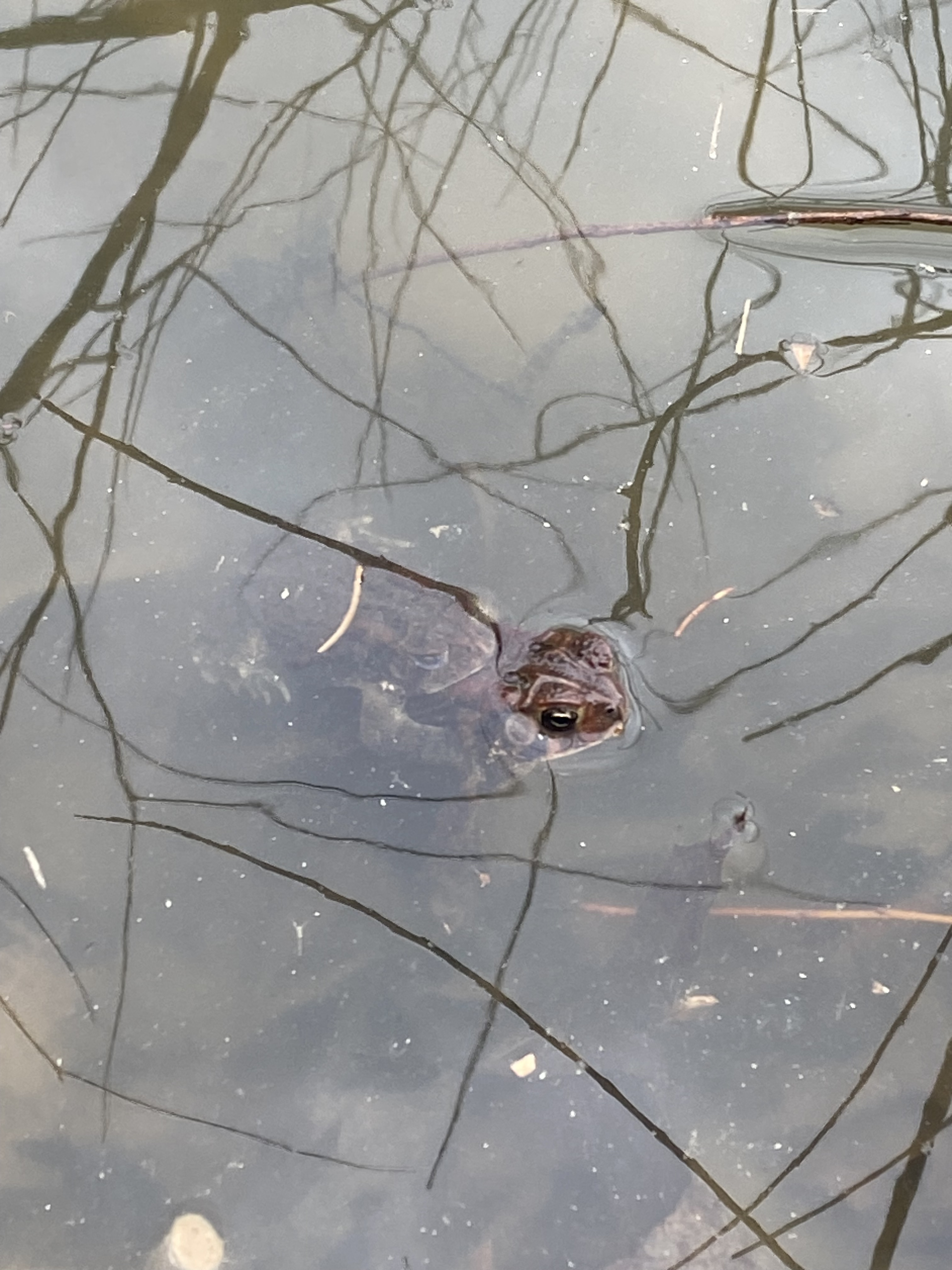
American toads during amplexus in Missouri

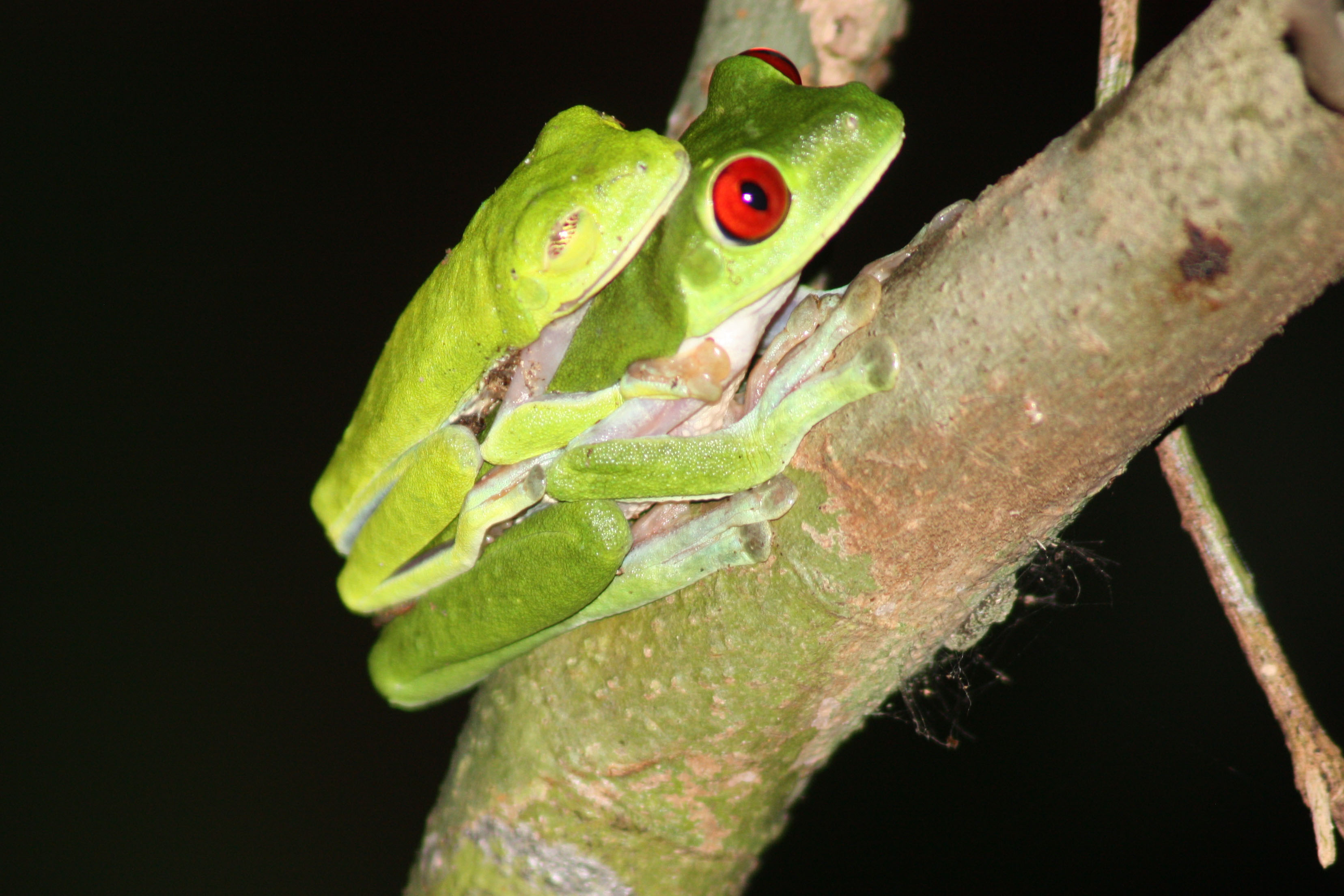
Red-eyed tree frog (Agalychnis callidryas), Costa Rica

=== Anurans ===
Amplexus chiefly occurs aquatically, but some terrestrial anurans (frogs and toads) like the disc-tongued frogs (Discoglossidae) perform amplexus on land. In crown-group anurans, like the true frogs (Ranidae), the tree frogs (Hylidae), and the true toads (Bufonidae), amplexus is axillary (in the armpits). Other anurans (the Archaeobatrachia, Sooglossidae and Myobatrachidae), show the ancestral state which is inguinal or lumbar amplexus (abdominal, in front of the hindlegs). Some species show cephalic amplexus where the head of the female is held while others show complete lack of amplexus. Additionally, anurans species have been observed to engage in multiple amplexus, which can also be referred to as a mating ball, as many toads attach themselves to a female trying to initiate amplexus. However, multiple amplexus is not common among anurans, which could indicate that the costs associated with multiple amplexus are higher than the advantages associated with it. For female anurans, the idea of multiple amplexus would probably be more advantageous, because mating with more than one male would increase fertilization chances or increase offspring genetic diversity. Multiple amplexus would typically be common in explosive breeding amphibians, when there is a larger number of adults ready to breed at a breeding site in a short period of time. When this occurs female amphibians are viewed as a very important resource for males, as there are typically more males present than females, thus leading to more chances for multiple amplexus to occur.

In most anurans, the males deposit sperm onto the eggs as they are being laid, however males of the genus Ascaphus possess an intromittent organ, unique among anurans, for internal fertilization. Internal fertilization does occur in a few other genera, including Nectophrynoides, Mertensophryne, and Eleutherodactylus.

=== Newts ===
In the case of newts, the process of amplexus is often observed soon after the newts become seasonally active. In the Western USA, for example, this time is typically soon after the onset of the winter rainy season, when intermittent streams and vernal pools become available as a breeding habitat. The rough-skinned newt is a specific widespread example of a newt in the western USA that can be observed in quiet stream pools and shallow ponds engaging in amplexus. During amplexus in newts, males will typically show the behaviour of tail fanning and chin rubbing which is thought to prompt the mating receptivity of the female newt. Studies have shown that male newts who have deeper tail-fins have better control of females during amplexus and are also more successful in catching the females for amplexus. Additionally, it has been found that the probability of a male newt who has a deeper tail-fin to achieve amplexus is greater than those newts who do not contain a deeper tail-fin, as male newts tend to use their tails during male-male competition. When a male newt, who is unpaired, encounters a female and male newt engaged in amplexus, the unpaired newt will try to displace the paired male newt by using wrestling tactics. A study examining the wrestling behaviour of newts found that of the observed wrestling encounters, 90% were "won" by the paired male, meaning he would retain the female newt. The study found that the invading unpaired newt rarely successfully displaces the paired male newt, engaged in amplexus.

== Horseshoe crabs ==
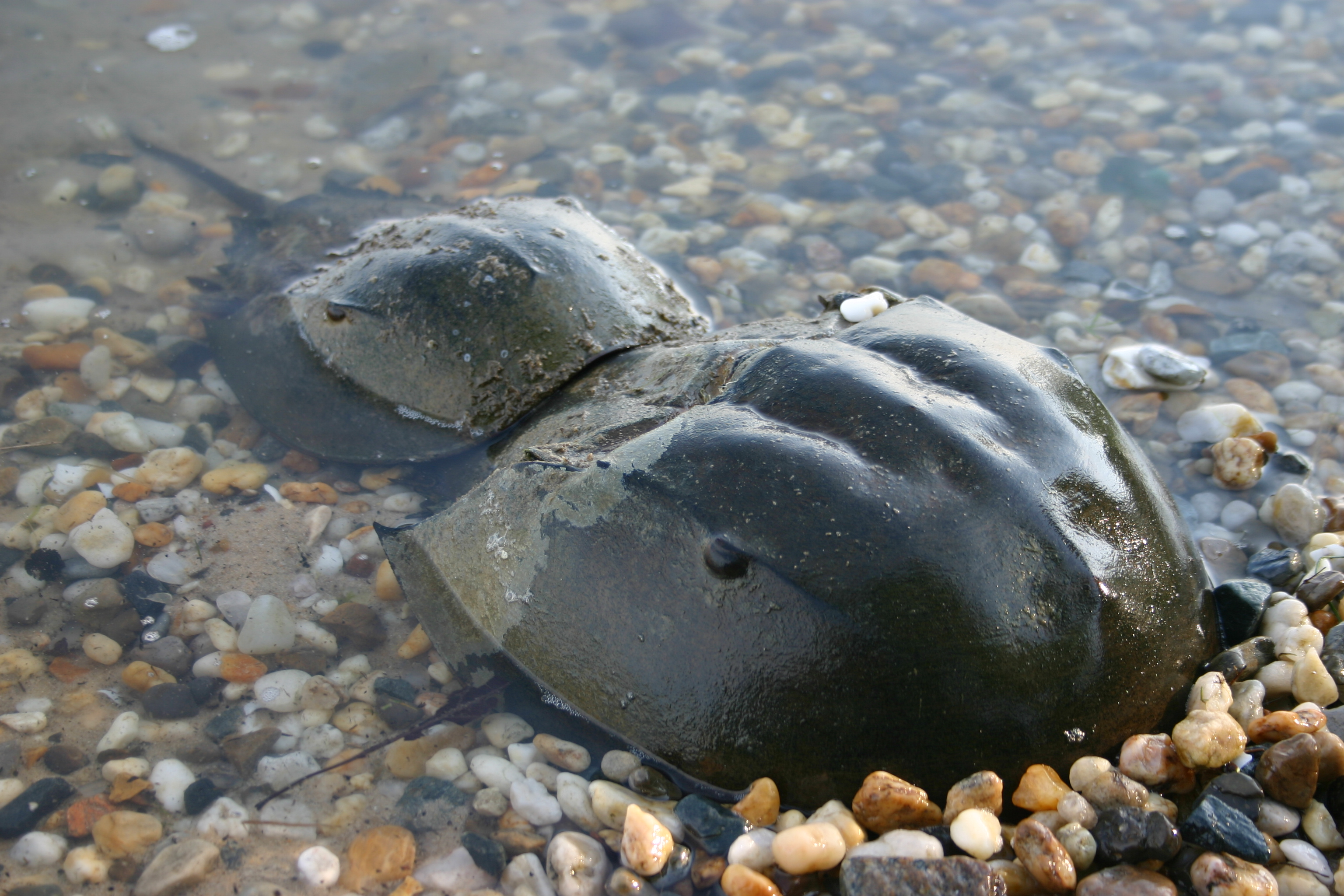
Amplectant pair of Limulus polyphemus. The male is the smaller individual.

Amplexus occurs in all four species of horseshoe crab. Horseshoe crabs typically go ashore for amplexus in high tide, and end up on beaches where the eggs are more protected. The first pair of walking legs is used to tightly clasp the female in all species, and the second pair is also employed in all but Limulus polyphemus. A male horseshoe crab develops modified claspers during sexual maturity when the male moults; these modified claspers can then help during the process of amplexus. The male's pair of posterior claspers are known for having the ability to maintain long-term amplexus which have been found to always attach to the female's opisthosoma during amplexus. In contrast, the male's anterior claspers have been found to attach to the female's opisthosoma as well, but on the lateral edges of the opisthosoma and function to resist displacement from environmental factors. Unique among aquatic arthropods, amplexus is most likely to occur between horseshoe crabs when the female horseshoe crab has a hard shell. A male horseshoe crab's claspers may also be an important factor of consideration for the initiation of amplexus. Since claspers are used for the attachment to the female, claspers that are in good condition are more successful for the initiation of amplexus. If a male horseshoe crab has a damaged or missing clasper, then that puts the male at a disadvantage and increases the probability of being displaced by other competing male crabs.

== Other animals ==
Fossil evidence suggests that a certain euthycarcinoid (an extinct arthropod) from the Cambrian may also have mated by amplexus. Crustaceans of the order Amphipoda engage in amplexus.

== See also ==
- Nuptial pad – Secondary sex characteristic on some mature male frogs and salamanders
