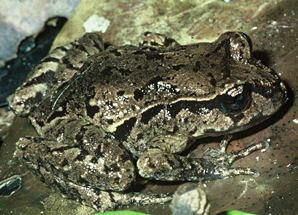

Conservation status
- Vulnerable (IUCN 3.1)

Scientific classification
- Kingdom: Animalia
- Phylum: Chordata
- Class: Amphibia
- Order: Anura
- Family: Leiopelmatidae
- Genus: Leiopelma
- Species: L. pakeka

Binomial name
- Leiopelma pakeka Bell, Daugherty & Hay, 1998
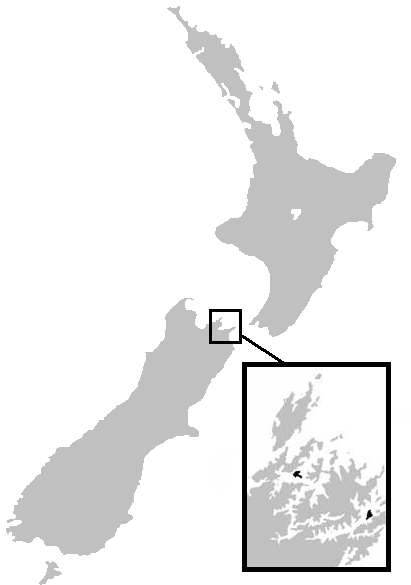
- Range of Maud Island Frog

= Maud Island frog =

Species of amphibian

The Maud Island frog (Leiopelma pakeka) is a primitive frog native to New Zealand, one of only four extant species belonging to the family Leiopelmatidae.

== Description ==
Leiopelma pakeka is a small terrestrial frog, growing to 5 cm (2.0 in) in length, and is medium to dark brown with unwebbed toes and a distinctive extended ridge behind its eyes. It is slightly larger than and differs slightly in colour from Hamilton's frog (Leiopelma hamiltoni).

Like other members of the genus Leiopelma, Maud Island frogs lay their eggs on moist ground. Between 1 and 19 eggs are laid in December, and are guarded by the male for 14–21 weeks. The eggs hatch into froglets, which the male carries on his back until they become independent.

Long-term studies beginning in 1983 have revealed this species is extremely long-lived: some monitored frogs reach 35–40 years old, making them the longest-lived wild frog in the world. Individuals are well-camouflaged and sedentary, spending their whole lives within a 30 m^{2} (320 sq ft) area and moving the centre of their home range only 1.3 m (4 ft 3 in) every 10 years – one of the smallest home ranges known for any vertebrate.

== Taxonomy ==
The frogs on Maud Island in Pelorus Sound / Te Hoiere, Marlborough, were discovered in 1940 and formally reported in 1958; they resembled L. hamiltoni found on nearby Stephens Island and were considered to be a subpopulation of that species. In 1998, an analysis of the muscle proteins (allozymes) of L. hamiltoni from both islands showed enough differences that the Maud Island population was designated a separate species, name L. pakeka from the Māori word for Maud Island. This then meant that the total world population of L. hamiltoni was less than 300 individuals living in a small pile of rocks on Stephens Island.

Recent studies of mtDNA from all four extant Leiopelma species do not support the results of the allozyme analysis, however; the genetic difference between L. pakeka and L. hamiltoni is no greater than that seen between different populations of Archey's frog (L. archeyi), which calls into question the designation of the Maud Island frog as a separate species. A similar conflict between blood allozymes and DNA led to the lumping of the Brothers Island tuatara (Sphenodon guntheri) back into Sphenodon punctatus.

== Conservation ==
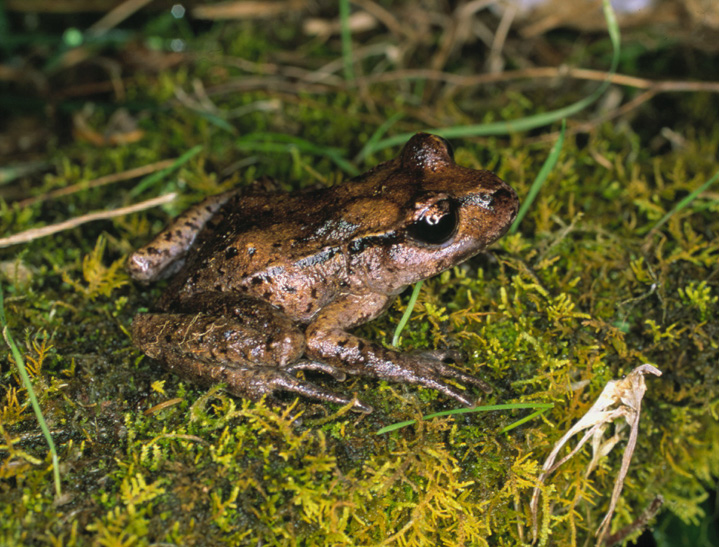
L. pakeka on Maud Island

L. pakeka is classed as taxonomically indistinct in the 2017 version of the New Zealand Threat Classification System, due to three independent genetic analyses finding it to be minimally differentiated from Hamilton's frog. In the prior edition of the New Zealand Threat Classification, L. pakeka was classified as both taxonomically indeterminate and Nationally Vulnerable.

The entire species was initially confined to a 16-hectare (40-acre) forest remnant on 309-hectare (760-acre) Maud Island. Although its population on Maud Island is estimated to be 27,500–39,500, conservation has focused on establishing new populations on different islands, because the species is still vulnerable to fungal disease, natural disaster, climate change, or the arrival of mammalian predators. Maud Island suffered an incursion of mice in 2013, but these were eradicated and the island was declared predator-free in November 2016.

External videos
- Meet the Locals (TVNZ video showing Maud Island and L. pakeka)

In 1984–85 100 frogs were transferred by the Department of Conservation to a different part of Maud Island, successfully starting a new colony. Three hundred were translocated 25 km (16 mi) to Motuara Island in Queen Charlotte Sound in 1997 – the first time New Zealand frogs had been translocated between islands. This was more successful than a 2006 translocation of 100 to nearby Long Island; Motuara contained better habitat and frogs there were protected by a kiwi-proof fence.

In 2006, 60 Maud Island frogs were released into the predator-proof Karori Wildlife Sanctuary near Wellington, and 100 more in 2012. Most of the frogs were released in a kiwi- and mouse-proof enclosure, but 29 were placed outside the enclosure so that a comparative study could be done. In February 2008, 13 froglets were discovered clinging to adult males inside the enclosure. Those outside the enclosure mostly disappeared.
