= Trevor Worthy =

New Zealand paleozoologist (born 1957)

- Born: Trevor Henry Worthy; 3 January 1957 (age 69); New Zealand
- Other name: "Mr. Moa"
- Education: University of Adelaide
- Known for: Work on the moa
- Awards: D. L. Serventy Medal
- Scientific career
- Fields: Paleozoologist
- Workplaces: Flinders University
- Thesis: Tertiary fossil waterfowl (Aves: anseriformes) of Australia and New Zealand (2008)
- Doctoral advisors: Alan Cooper; Michael Soon Yoong Lee; Walter Boles

Trevor Henry Worthy (born 3 January 1957) is an Australia-based paleozoologist from New Zealand, known for his research on moa and other extinct vertebrates.

== Biography ==
Worthy grew up in Broadwood, Northland, and went to Whangarei Boys' High School. He began his career as a largely self-taught palaeontologist, after becoming interested in fossils through caving. Worthy completed his BSc and MSc at the University of Waikato, then did a second Master's degree at Victoria University of Wellington.

In 1987, Worthy described three new leiopelmatid frog species from cave subfossils: the Aurora frog (Leiopelma auroraensis), Markham's frog (Leiopelma markhami), and the Waitomo frog (Leiopelma waitomoensis). In the 1990s, he discovered several fossil bird species new to science, including the long-billed wren (Dendroscansor decurvirostris) in 1991, Scarlett's shearwater (Puffinus spelaeus) in 1991, and the Niue night heron (Nycticorax kalavikai) in 1995. In 1991, he also described the Northland skink, a fossil skink species new to science.

In 1998, Worthy excavated subfossil bones in Fiji, where he found remains of the flightless Viti Levu giant pigeon (Natunaornis gigoura), the Viti Levu scrubfowl (Megapodius amissus), the Viti Levu snipe (Coenocorypha miratropica), the giant Fiji ground frog (Platymantis megabotoniviti), and the small freshwater crocodile Volia athollandersoni. The holotypes of these species were deposited in the Museum of New Zealand Te Papa Tongarewa.

For years, Worthy has been involved in the excavation of Miocene fossils (the Saint Bathans Fauna) from a prehistoric lake in Central Otago, including the oldest known moa bones, the oldest tuatara bones, and the first known fossil land mammal from New Zealand.

Worthy's research, based in Waitomo Caves, Masterton, Nelson, and Te Papa, had been funded by grants from the Foundation for Research, Science and Technology since 1991, but in 2005 his funding was cut by the Foundation. From 2005 to 2009, he was at the University of Adelaide, where he received his PhD in 2008. He received a Doctor of Science from the University of Waikato in 2011. He was at the University of New South Wales from 2009 to 2011, back at the University of Adelaide during 2012, and has been at Flinders University since 2013. In May 2019, he ended his 30-year research association with Te Papa at protest to the staff restructuring controversy.

Worthy is author or co-author of numerous research papers about prehistoric life in New Zealand. For the book The Lost World of the Moa (2002), he and Richard Holdaway received the D. L. Serventy Medal from the Royal Australasian Ornithologists Union in 2003 for an outstanding published work about Australasian avifauna.

Below is a list of taxa that Worthy has contributed to naming:

Year	Taxon	Authors
2026	Porphyrio claytongreenei sp. nov.	Worthy, Scofield, Suresh, Barker, Wilson, Williams, & Baker
2026	Strigops insulaborealis sp. nov.	Worthy, Scofield, Suresh, Barker, Wilson, Williams, & Baker
2023	Murgonornis archeri gen. et sp. nov.	Worthy, De Pietri, Scofield, & Hand
2023	Lumakoala blackae gen. et sp. nov.	Crichton, Beck, Couzens, Worthy, Camens, & Prideaux
2023	Mukupirna fortidentata sp. nov.	Crichton, Worthy, Camens, Yates, Couzens, & Prideaux
2022	Archaehierax sylvestris gen. et sp. nov.	Mather, Lee, Camens, & Worthy
2022	Manuherikia primadividua sp. nov.	Worthy, Scofield, Salisbury, Hand, De Pietri, Blokland, & Archer
2022	Notochen bannockburnensis gen. et sp. nov.	Worthy, Scofield, Hand, De Pietri, & Archer
2019	Heracles inexpectatus gen. et sp. nov.	Worthy, Hand, Archer, Scofield, & De Pietri
2019	Litorallus livezeyi gen. et sp. nov.	Mather, Tennyson, Scofield, De Pietri, Hand, Archer, Handley, & Worthy
2019	Priscaweka parvales gen. et sp. nov.	Mather, Tennyson, Scofield, De Pietri, Hand, Archer, Handley, & Worthy
2018	Vulcanops jennyworthyae gen. et sp. nov.	Hand, Beck, Archer, Simmons, Gunnell, Scofield, Tennyson, De Pietri, Salisbury, & Worthy
2016	Oligonomus milleri gen. et sp. nov.	De Pietri, Camens, & Worthy
2016	Dromornis murrayi sp. nov.	Worthy, Handley, Archer, & Hand
2015	Mwalau walterlinii gen. et sp. nov.	Worthy, Hawkins, Bedford, & Spriggs
2013	Kurrartapu johnnguyeni gen. et sp. nov.	Nguyen, Worthy, Boles, Hand, & Archer
2012	Priscakoala lucyturnbullae gen. et sp. nov.	Black, Archer, & Hand
2012	Anhinga walterbolesi sp. nov.	Worthy
2011	Nambashag microglaucus sp. nov.	Worthy
2011	Nambashag billerooensis gen. et sp. nov.	Worthy
2010	Kuiornis indicator gen. et sp. nov.	Worthy, Hand, Nguyen, Tennyson, Worthy, Scofield, Boles, & Archer
2008	Tirarinetta kanunka gen. et sp. nov.	Worthy
2008	Bountyphaps obsoleta gen. et sp. nov.	Worthy & Wragg
2008	Manuherikia douglasi sp. nov.	Worthy, Tennyson, Hand, & Scofield
2004	Vitirallus watlingi gen. et sp. nov.	Worthy
2003	Gallicolumba leonpascoi gen. et sp. nov.	Worthy & Wragg
2002	Volia athollandersoni gen. et sp. nov.	Molnar, Worthy, & Willis
