= Manuherikia (bird) =

Manuherikia Temporal range: Early Miocene 19–16 Ma

Scientific classification
- Kingdom: Animalia
- Phylum: Chordata
- Class: Aves
- Order: Anseriformes
- Superfamily: Anatoidea
- Family: Anatidae
- Subfamily: †Dendrocheninae; Livezey & Martin 1988
- Genus: †Manuherikia; Worthy et al., 2007

Species
- M. lacustrina Worthy et al., 2007; M. minuta Worthy et al., 2007; M. douglasi Worthy et al., 2008; M. primadividua Worthy et al., 2021

Extinct genus of birds

Manuherikia is a genus of extinct species of ducks from the Miocene of New Zealand. It was described from fossil material of the Saint Bathans Fauna, in the lower Bannockburn Formation of the Manuherikia Group, found by the Manuherikia River in the Central Otago region of the South Island. The genus name comes from the name of the geological formation in which the fossils were found and, ultimately, from the Manuherikia River and its valley.

== Species ==
Described species are:

- Manuherikia lacustrina Worthy et al., 2007 – Described from a complete left humerus collected from a Saint Bathans Fauna site on Home Hills Station, it was about the same size as an Australasian shoveler. It is the most abundant of the birds found in the Manuherikia Group deposits. Examination of its relatively plentiful remains indicate that, structurally, it was a specialist diver. Its specific epithet refers to the lacustrine source of the sediments in which its remains were found.
- Manuherikia minuta Worthy et al., 2007 – Described from a complete left humerus collected from a Saint Bathans Fauna site on Home Hills Station, it was a very small duck, being slightly smaller than a pink-eared duck. Its specific epithet refers to its extremely small size.
- Manuherikia douglasi Worthy et al., 2008 – Described from a complete right humerus and four ulnae collected from a Saint Bathans Fauna site near the Manuherikia River, it was the largest of the three species in its genus. Its specific epithet honours geologist Barry Douglas, the original discoverer of bird fossils in the Manuherikia Group sediments.
- Manuherikia primadividua Worthy et al., 2021 – Described from many limb bones and parts of the skull collected from the Saint Bathans Fauna site near the Manuherikia River.
