= Nambashag =

Nambashag Temporal range: 26–24 Ma

Scientific classification
- Kingdom: Animalia
- Phylum: Chordata
- Class: Aves
- Order: Suliformes
- Family: Phalacrocoracidae
- Genus: †Nambashag; Worthy, 2011

Species
- †N. billerooensis Worthy, 2011 (type); †N. microglaucus Worthy, 2011

Extinct genus of birds

Nambashag is an extinct genus of early cormorant from Late Oligocene and Early Miocene (about 26–24 mya) deposits of South Australia. The genus was first named by Trevor H. Worthy in 2011 and the type species is Nambashag billerooensis. A second species, N. microglaucus, was also named. The type species is known from 30 specimens while N. microglaucus is known from 14 specimens. The specimens of Nambashag were collected from the Etadunna and Namba Formations in the Lake Eyre and Lake Frome Basins.
