= Maud Island =

Island in New Zealand

Te Hoiere (Māori)
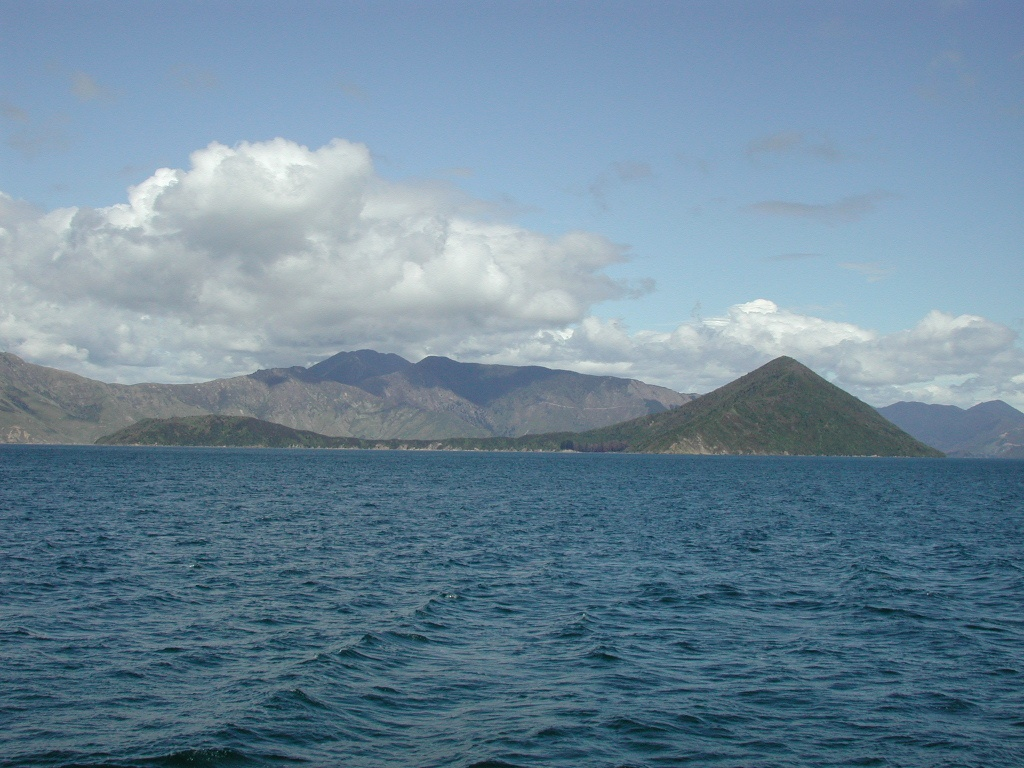
- Maud Island viewed from northeast

- Location of Maud Island Maud Island (New Zealand)

Geography
- Location: Pelorus Sound / Te Hoiere
- Coordinates: 41°02′S 173°53′E
- Area: 3.20 km^{2} (1.24 sq mi)
- Length: 3.5 km (2.17 mi)
- Highest elevation: 368 m (1207 ft)

Administration
- New Zealand

Demographics
- Population: 0

Maud Island (Māori: Te Hoiere) is one of the larger islands in the Marlborough Sounds on the northeastern tip of the South Island of New Zealand, with a total area of 320 ha (790 acres).

== Geography ==
Maud Island is situated approximately halfway along the convoluted Pelorus Sound / Te Hoiere, between two long peninsulas of the South Island. It is separated from the mainland in the west by Apuau Channel and in the north and east by Waitātā Reach. To its south lies Tawhitinui Reach.

The island comprises two main parts: the bulk of the island lies to the west and is oriented roughly northeast to southwest; a smaller spur, connected by a narrow 1-kilometre long isthmus, lies to the east. The island's southernmost point, Harter Point, is on this spur. The island is hilly, reaching a height of 368 metres (1,207 ft) in the west and 113 metres (371 ft) on the spur.

A walking track, the Gun Emplacement Track, circles the western part of the island.

== History ==
The first human settlement on the island was by Māori, who cultivated extensive gardens and built food storage pits and gave the island the name Te Pākeka. Ownership of the island was granted to European settler John Gibson in 1867.

Military installations were built on the island during World War II. Remains of the old gun emplacements and range finding equipment can be seen from the track, close to the island's northernmost point. A jetty was installed on the island at the same time, to enable the equipment to be maintained. In 1971, then-owner Jack Shand gifted some of the island to the Crown; the rest of the island became Royal Forest and Bird Protection property soon afterwards.

== Fauna ==
Maud Island is an important predator free nature reserve (officially a Scientific Reserve as defined under New Zealand's Reserves Act) to which only scientists and conservationists have access. Visitors need a special permit issued by the New Zealand Department of Conservation.

Thanks to the efforts of conservationist Don Merton, kākāpō was introduced onto the predator-free island in 1974. Additional kākāpō were subsequently translocated onto other Islands like Codfish Island / Whenua Hou, Anchor Island and Little Barrier Island.

After only one breeding attempt by pair Flossie and Richard Henry in 1998 where three chicks were born, Maud Island's kākāpō population was translocated to more forested islands. The takahē was also introduced there in 1985.

Another rare species is the Maud Island frog (Leiopelma pakeka), which was split from the Hamilton's frog (Leiopelma hamiltoni) but has now been synonymized with L. hamiltoni. Maud Island has a rich invertebrate fauna. Wētā are numerous with tree wētā, cave wētā and Cook Strait giant wētā likely to be seen at night. A large weevil, the flax weevil can be seen on flax and the rare Cook Strait click beetle is also present on the island.

== Name ==
The island's two names, Maud Island and Te Hoiere, were both given official status in 1948. Te Hoiere is also used as the Māori name for Pelorus Sound. The island's former name of Te Pākeka is still used for the Te Pākeka/Maud Island Scientific Reserve.

== Climate ==
Climate data for Maud Island (1991–2020)
Month	Jan	Feb	Mar	Apr	May	Jun	Jul	Aug	Sep	Oct	Nov	Dec	Year
Mean daily maximum °C (°F)	21.0 (69.8)	21.3 (70.3)	19.8 (67.6)	17.6 (63.7)	15.4 (59.7)	13.1 (55.6)	12.2 (54.0)	13.0 (55.4)	14.3 (57.7)	16.0 (60.8)	17.5 (63.5)	19.6 (67.3)	16.7 (62.1)
Daily mean °C (°F)	17.6 (63.7)	17.9 (64.2)	16.6 (61.9)	14.6 (58.3)	12.7 (54.9)	10.6 (51.1)	9.6 (49.3)	10.1 (50.2)	11.4 (52.5)	12.8 (55.0)	14.2 (57.6)	16.3 (61.3)	13.7 (56.7)
Mean daily minimum °C (°F)	14.3 (57.7)	14.5 (58.1)	13.4 (56.1)	11.6 (52.9)	10.0 (50.0)	8.1 (46.6)	7.0 (44.6)	7.3 (45.1)	8.6 (47.5)	9.7 (49.5)	11.0 (51.8)	13.0 (55.4)	10.7 (51.3)
Average rainfall mm (inches)	105 (4.1)	91.2 (3.59)	91.8 (3.61)	122.8 (4.83)	157.5 (6.20)	172.5 (6.79)	136.1 (5.36)	155.1 (6.11)	137.8 (5.43)	179.1 (7.05)	118.8 (4.68)	149.2 (5.87)	1,616.9 (63.62)
Source: NIWA

== See also ==
- List of islands of New Zealand
- List of islands
- Desert island
