= Aurora Cave =

Cave in New Zealand

Coordinates: 45°17′43.07″S 167°41′52.39″E

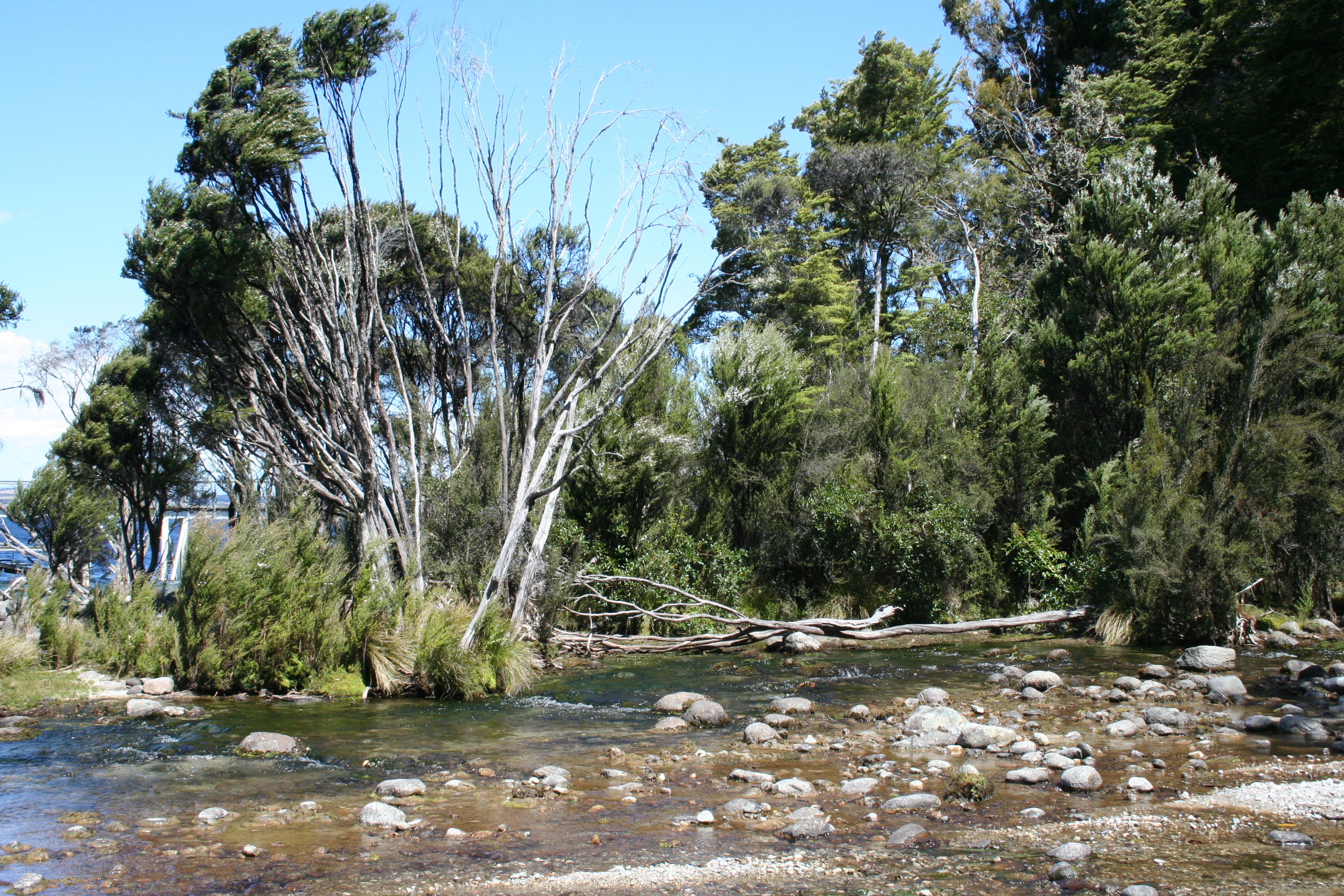
Te Anau Caves

Aurora Cave is a limestone cave, part of the Te Ana-au Caves in Fiordland, in the South Island of New Zealand on the western side of a deep glacial trough containing Lake Te Anau. Aurora Cave is separated by a sump from Te Ana-au Cave (a tourist cave). The cave has been formed by the Tunnel Burn, which drains from Lake Orbell in the Takahe valley. Aurora Cave is 267 metres deep and 6 km. long. Around 1988, a subfossil of an extinct species of frog were discovered. It was named the Aurora frog (Leiopelma auroraensis).

== See also ==
- List of caves in New Zealand
