= Harold Hamilton (biologist) =

New Zealand biologist

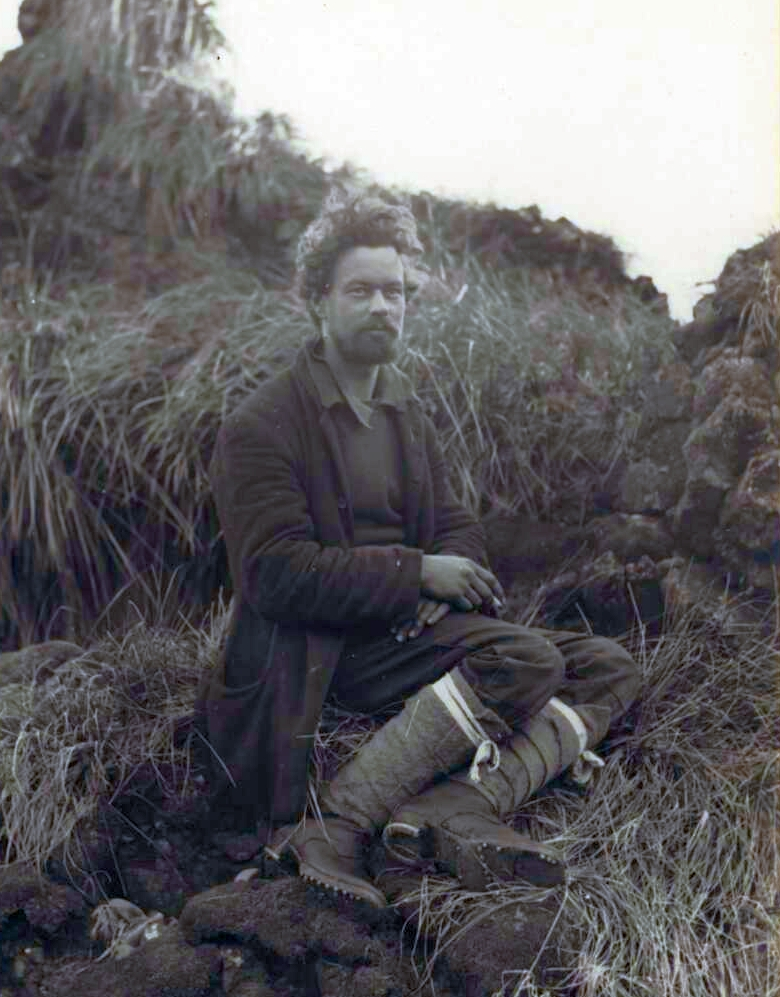
- On Macquarie Island (1911-14)
- Born: February 2, 1885; Napier, New Zealand
- Died: December 31, 1937 (aged 52); Rotorua, New Zealand
- Occupation: biologist
- Known for: Australasian Antarctic Expedition

Harold Hamilton (2 February 1885 – 31 December 1937) was a New Zealand biologist who was a member of the Australasian Antarctic Expedition (1911-1914). The Stephen's Island frog Leiopelma hamiltoni was first collected by him and the species was named after him.

== Life and work ==
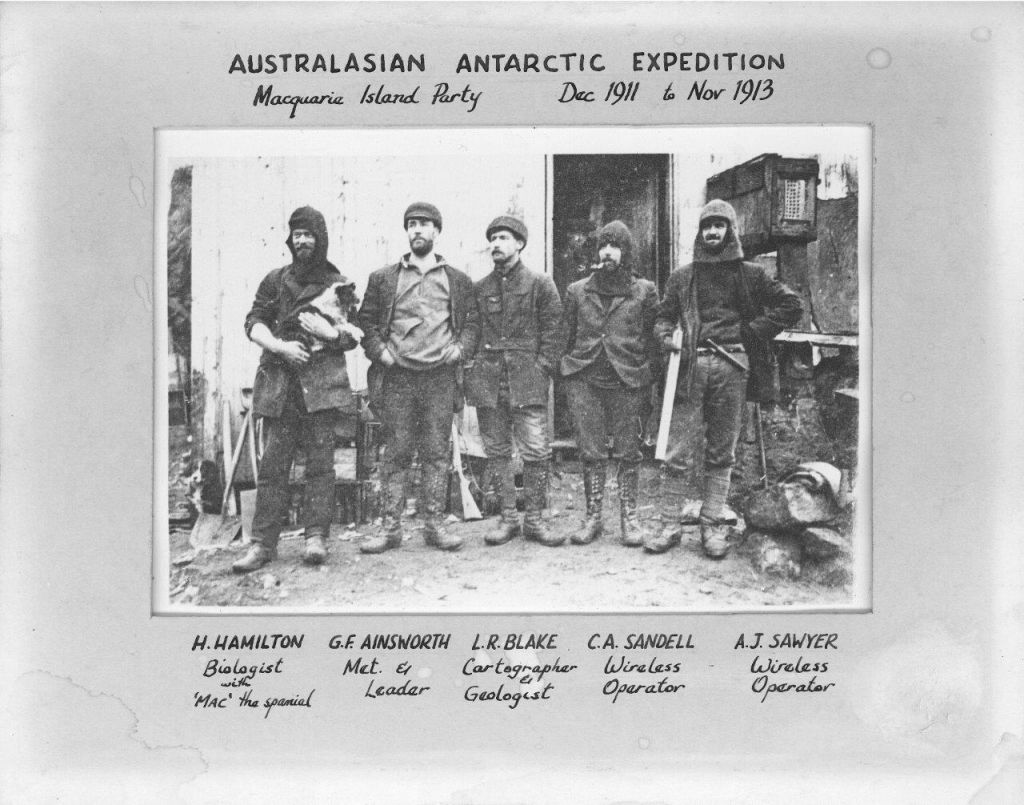
Hamilton as part of the Macquarie team in 1911

Hamilton was born in Napier, New Zealand, son of Augustus Hamilton and Hope Ellen née McKain. His father was the director of the Dominion Museum in Wellington from 1903 to 1907. He studied at Waitaki Boys' High School, after which he received a diploma from the School of Mines, Otago University. He then worked at the Dominion Museum as an entomological collector and with the New Zealand Geological Survey. During 1911 he spent five months at the Australian Museum in Sydney, studying its natural history collections.

Hamilton joined the Australasian Antarctic Expedition in 1911 under Douglas Mawson and was a member of the Macquarie Island party, serving as its biologist. Here he collected specimens along with Leslie Russell Blake who was involved in topographical survey. The highest peak on Macquarie was named after him as Hamilton. They were forced to survive on fish and birds eggs while on the island after supplies became limited. Hamilton was awarded the Polar Medal (silver) in 1915 for his work with the expedition.

During World War I he served in the Royal Navy Volunteer Reserve aboard the Athenic off Britain. From 1919 to 1927 he worked with the Dominion Museum and then became the director of the School of Maori Arts in Rotorua. He died in Rotorua in 1937.
