= Vitirallus =

Vitirallus Temporal range: Late Pleistocene-Early Holocene

Scientific classification
- Kingdom: Animalia
- Phylum: Chordata
- Class: Aves
- Order: Gruiformes
- Family: Rallidae
- Genus: †Vitirallus; T. H. Worthy, 2004
- Species: †V. watlingi

Binomial name
- †Vitirallus watlingi T. H. Worthy, 2004

Extinct species of bird

Vitirallus watlingi, the Fiji rail or Viti Levu rail, was a prehistoric flightless bird from Fiji, and is the only species in the genus Vitirallus. Vitirallus watlingi is thought to have been about the same size as the bar-winged rail (Nesoclopeus poecilopterus) but with a very elongated and slender bill.

The genus name refers to Viti Levu, the island of origin in Fiji; rallus is Latin for rail. The species name watlingi is after the ornithologist Dr. Dick Watling.

Remains of this species were discovered in September 1998 at Viti Levu, the largest island in the Republic of Fiji. It was first described by Trevor H. Worthy in 2004. The holotype is in the collection of the Museum of New Zealand Te Papa Tongarewa.

== See also ==
- List of Late Quaternary prehistoric bird species
