= Leiopelma waitomoensis =

Leiopelma waitomoensis Temporal range: Late Holocene

Conservation status
- Extinct (yes) (NZ TCS)

Scientific classification
- Kingdom: Animalia
- Phylum: Chordata
- Class: Amphibia
- Order: Anura
- Family: Leiopelmatidae
- Genus: Leiopelma
- Species: †L. waitomoensis

Binomial name
- †Leiopelma waitomoensis Worthy, 1987

Extinct species of amphibian

The Waitomo frog (Leiopelma waitomoensis) is an extinct species of the genus Leiopelma from New Zealand.

The Waitomo frog's distribution was solely in the North Island of New Zealand. Its extinction is believed to have happened during the last 1000 years. Its subfossil remains were discovered at a cave near Waitomo. L. waitomoensis was a large, robust frog, and presumably many times heavier than other native frogs. It was around 100 mm in length, about twice the size of any other native New Zealand frogs. It was first described by Trevor H. Worthy in 1987 along with the Aurora frog and Markham's frog.

== See also ==
- List of amphibians of New Zealand
- List of extinct animals of New Zealand
