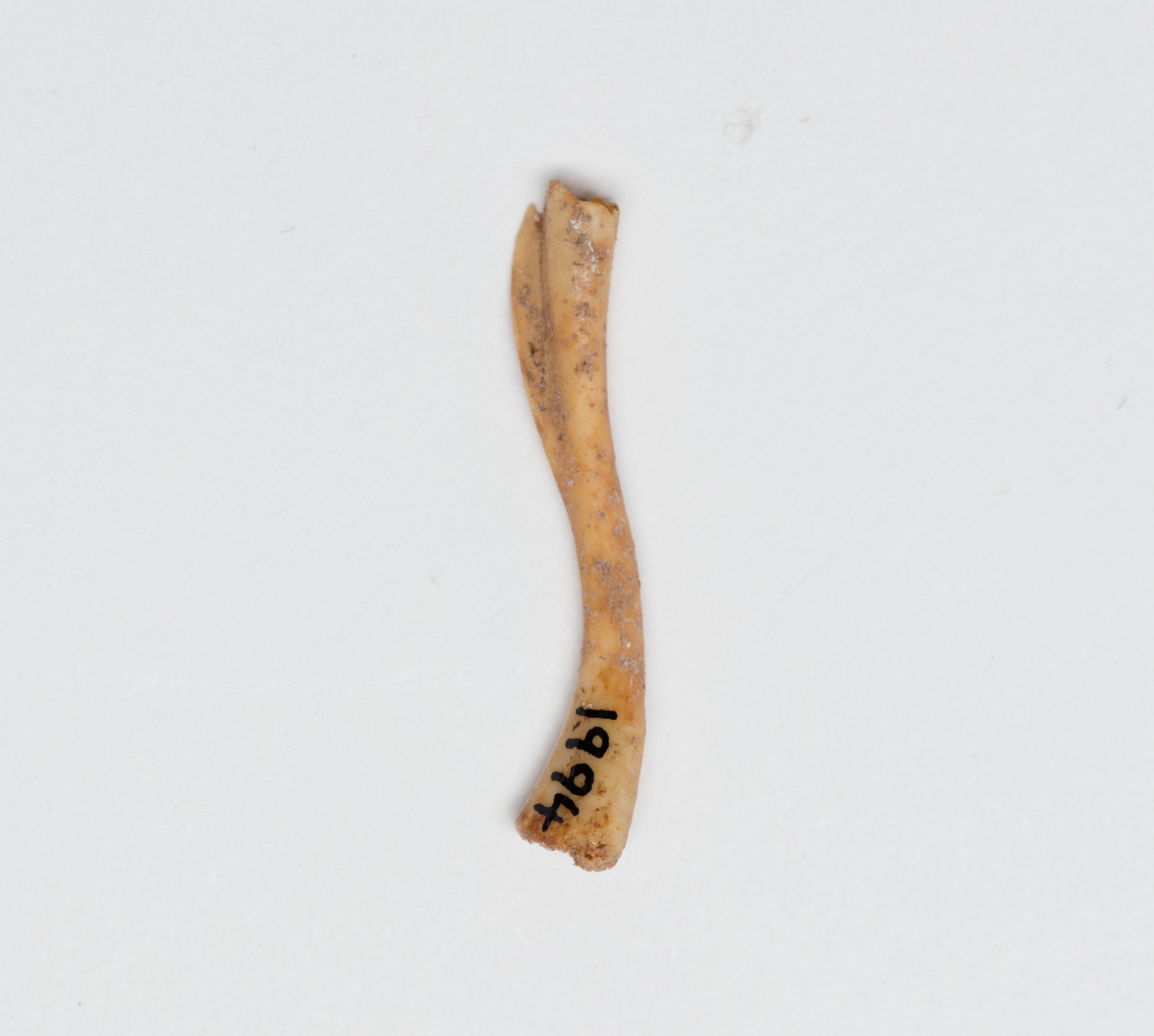
- Fossilised bone of a markham's frog.

Conservation status
- Extinct (NZ TCS)

Scientific classification
- Kingdom: Animalia
- Phylum: Chordata
- Class: Amphibia
- Order: Anura
- Family: Leiopelmatidae
- Genus: Leiopelma
- Species: †L. markhami

Binomial name
- †Leiopelma markhami Worthy, 1987

= Markham's frog =

Markham's frog Temporal range: Holocene

Extinct species of amphibian

Markham's frog (Leiopelma markhami) is one of three extinct New Zealand frog species, the others being the Aurora frog (Leiopelma auroraensis) and Waitomo frog (Leiopelma waitomoensis). Subfossil bones used to describe the species were discovered at Honeycomb Hill Cave, South Island, New Zealand, but it once occurred on both South and North Islands. It is estimated that it grew between 50 and 60 mm from snout to vent and it appears to have been a very robust animal.

== See also ==
- List of extinct animals of New Zealand
- List of amphibians of New Zealand
