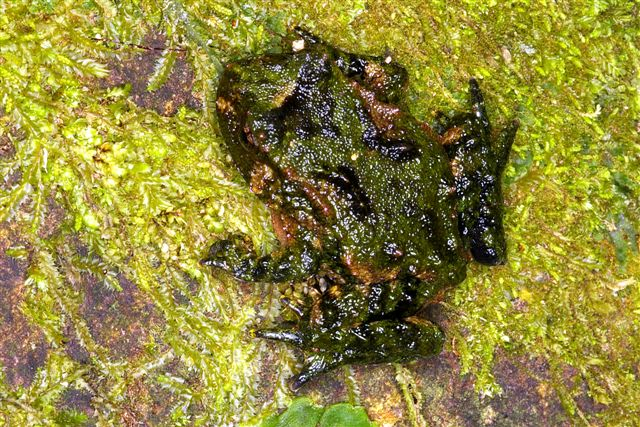
- Hochstetter's frog (Leiopelma hochstetteri)

Scientific classification
- Kingdom: Animalia
- Phylum: Chordata
- Class: Amphibia
- Order: Anura
- Suborder: Archaeobatrachia

Families
- Ascaphidae; Bombinatoridae; Alytidae (Discoglossidae); Leiopelmatidae †Notobatrachus

= Archaeobatrachia =

Archaeobatrachia Temporal range: Early Jurassic to present, 200–0 Ma

Suborder of amphibians

Archaeobatrachia (Neo-Latin archaeo- ("old") + batrachia ("frog")) is a suborder of the order Anura containing various primitive frogs and toads. As the name suggests, these are the most primitive frogs. Many of the species (28 in total) show certain physiological characteristics which are not present in other frogs and toads, thus giving rise to this group. They are largely found in Eurasia, New Zealand, the Philippines, and Borneo, and are characteristically small. In addition, the family Ascaphidae is found in the Pacific Northwest and northern Rocky Mountains of the United States, and is only represented by two species. The taxon is considered paraphyletic.
