= Leiopelma auroraensis =

Conservation status
- Extinct (NZ TCS)

Scientific classification
- Kingdom: Animalia
- Phylum: Chordata
- Class: Amphibia
- Order: Anura
- Family: Leiopelmatidae
- Genus: Leiopelma
- Species: †L. auroraensis

Binomial name
- †Leiopelma auroraensis Worthy, 1987

Extinct species of amphibian

Leiopelma auroraensis, known as the Aurora frog, is an extinct species of frog that was found in New Zealand. One subfossil of the Aurora frog has been discovered in the Aurora Cave, Fiordland, New Zealand. It measured about 60 mm from the snout to the vent. It is named after the Aurora Cave for where it was found. The other extinct New Zealand frogs are Markham's frog and Waitomo frog. Aurora frog probably was a local form that had evolved from the more widely distributed Markham's frog.

== See also ==
- List of amphibians of New Zealand
- List of extinct animals of New Zealand
