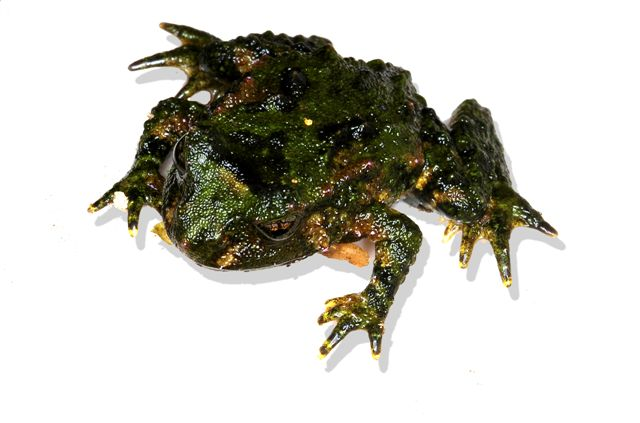
- Hochstetter's frog (Leiopelma hochstetteri)

Scientific classification
- Kingdom: Animalia
- Phylum: Chordata
- Class: Amphibia
- Order: Anura
- Suborder: Archaeobatrachia
- Family: Leiopelmatidae; Mivart, 1869
- Genus: Leiopelma; Fitzinger, 1861

Species
- See text
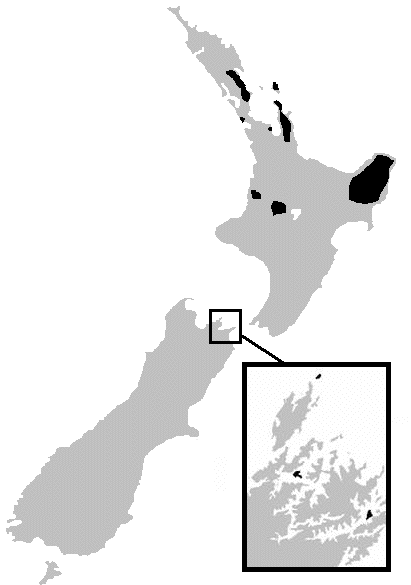
- Distribution of Leiopelmatidae (in black)

= Leiopelma =

Leiopelma Temporal range: Miocene–Recent

Genus of amphibians

Leiopelma is a genus of New Zealand primitive frogs, belonging to the suborder Archaeobatrachia. It is the only genus in the monotypic family Leiopelmatidae. The leiopelmatids' unique and ancestral features indicate they are part of an ancient lineage. While some taxonomists have suggested combining the North American frogs of the genus Ascaphus in the family Ascaphidae with the New Zealand frogs of the genus Leiopelma in the family Leiopelmatidae, the current consensus is that these two groups constitute two separate families. The three extant species of Leiopelmatidae are only found in New Zealand.

== Overview ==
The New Zealand primitive frogs' defining characteristics are their extra vertebrae (for a total of nine) and the remains of the tail muscles (the tail itself is absent in adults, although it is present in the younger frogs, which need the extra skin surface until their lungs are fully developed). These ancestral characteristics are shared with the family Ascaphidae (found only in North America), which is of the same suborder.

Late jump recovery is unique in Leiopelmatidae. When leiopelmatid species jump, they land in a "belly flop" fashion, repositioning their limbs for takeoff for the next jump only after hitting the ground with the ventral surface of their torsos. The appearance of early jump recovery in other frogs is a key innovation in anuran evolution.

They are unusually small frogs, only 5 cm (2.0 in) in length. Most species lay their eggs in moist ground, typically under rocks or vegetation. After hatching, the tadpoles nest in the male's back, all without the need for standing or flowing water. However, Hochstetter's frog lays its eggs in shallow ponds and has free-living tadpoles, although they do not swim far from the place of hatching, or even feed, before metamorphosing into adult frogs. Lifespans may be long (more than 30 years) for such small organisms.

Introduced fauna are thought to have had a negative impact on these native frogs, with 93% of all reported predation events on native frogs being attributed to introduced fauna, primarily ship rats.

== Taxonomy & systematics ==
=== Species ===
Family Leiopelmatidae

- Genus Leiopelma
  - Archey's frog, Leiopelma archeyi Turbott, 1942
  - Hamilton's frog, Leiopelma hamiltoni McCulloch, 1919
  - Hochstetter's frog, Leiopelma hochstetteri Fitzinger, 1861
  - Maud Island frog, Leiopelma pakeka Bell, Daugherty & Hay, 1998

==== Extinct species ====
Three extinct species are known by subfossil remains, also from New Zealand. They became extinct during the past 1,000 years.

- †Aurora frog, Leiopelma auroraensis
- †Markham's frog, Leiopelma markhami
- †Waitomo frog, Leiopelma waitomoensis

One species from the late Pliocene period has recently been described.

- †Leiopelma bishopi Easton, Tennyson and Rawlence, 2021

Two species are known from Miocene deposits of the Saint Bathans fauna, with indeterminate remains possibly representing additional species

- †Leiopelma miocaenale
- †Leiopelma acricarina

=== Evolutionary history ===
DNA analysis indicates that Leiopelmatidae share a distant common ancestry with Ascaphidae to the exclusion of all other frogs, and Leiopelmatidae and Ascaphidae diverged from all other frogs around 200 million years ago. L. archeyi and L. hochstetteri are thought to have diverged from each other between 40 and 50 million years ago, based on genomic divergence estimates. Fossils of the genus are known from the early Miocene (19–16 million years ago) aged St Bathans Fauna of New Zealand.

- Anura
  - - Leiopelmatidae
    - Ascaphidae
  - Bombianura
    - Costata
      - Bombinatoridae
      - - Alytidae
        - Discoglossidae
    - Pipanura
      - Xenoanura
        - Pipidae
        - Rhinophrynidae
      - Acosmanura
        - Anomocoela
          - Scaphiopodidae
          - - Pelodytidae
            - Pelobatoidea
              - Pelobatidae
              - Megophryidae
        - Neobatrachia
          - Heleophrynidae
          - Phthanobatrachia
            - - Sooglossoidea
                - Sooglossidae
                - Nasikabatrachidae
            - - Notogaeanura
                - Australobatrachia
                  - Calyptocephalellidae
                  - - Myobatrachidae
                    - Limnodynastidae
                - Nobleoanura
                  - - Brachycephaloidea (Terrarana)
                      - Ceuthomantidae
                      - - Brachycephalidae
                        - - Eleutherodactylidae
                          - Craugastoridae
                  - - Hemiphractidae
                    - Athesphatanura
                      - Hylidae
                      - Leptodactyliformes
                        - - - Agastorophrynia
                              - Bufonidae
                              - - Aromobatidae
                                - Dendrobatidae
                          - - - Diphyabatracea
                                - Leptodactylidae
                                - - Allophrynidae
                                  - Centrolenidae
                            - - Ceratophryidae
                              - - Odontophrynidae
                                - - - Cycloramphidae
                                    - - Alsodidae
                                      - Hylodidae
                                  - - Telmatobiidae
                                    - - Batrachylidae
                                      - Rhinodermatidae
              - Ranoides
                - Allodapanura
                  - Microhylidae
                  - Afrobatrachia
                    - Xenosyneunitanura
                      - Brevicipitidae
                      - Hemisotidae
                    - Laurentobatrachia
                      - Hyperoliidae
                      - Arthroleptidae
                - Natatanura
                  - Ptychadenidae
                  - Victoranura
                    - Micrixalidae
                    - - Phrynobatrachidae
                      - - Conrauidae
                        - - - Pyxicephaloidea
                              - Petropedetidae
                              - Pyxicephalidae
                          - - - Nyctibatrachidae
                              - Ceratobatrachidae
                            - Saukrobatrachia
                              - - Ranixalidae
                                - Dicroglossidae
                              - Aglaioanura
                                - - Rhacophoridae
                                  - Mantellidae
                                - Ranidae

== See also ==
- Frogs of New Zealand
- Maud Island frog
