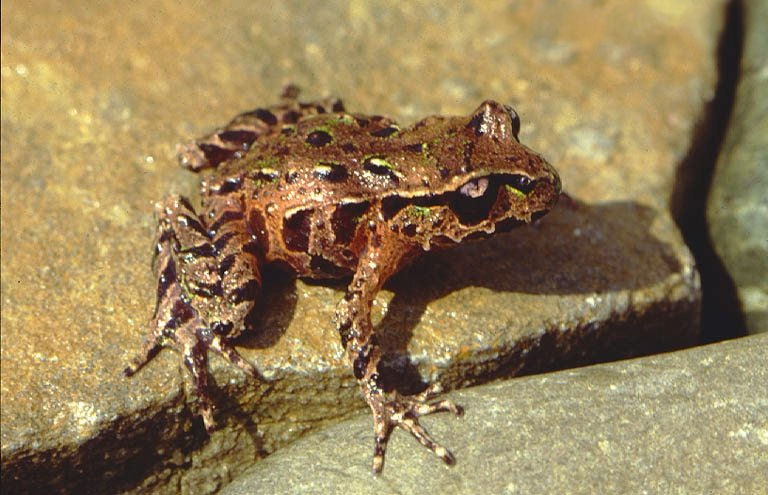

Conservation status
- Critically Endangered (IUCN 3.1)

Scientific classification
- Kingdom: Animalia
- Phylum: Chordata
- Class: Amphibia
- Order: Anura
- Family: Leiopelmatidae
- Genus: Leiopelma
- Species: L. archeyi

Binomial name
- Leiopelma archeyi Turbott, 1942
- Distribution of Archey's frog on the North Island map Known native range Native range (translocated)

= Archey's frog =

Species of amphibian

Archey's frog (Leiopelma archeyi) is an archaic species of frog endemic to the North Island of New Zealand. It is one of only three extant species belonging to the taxonomic family Leiopelmatidae. It is found only in the Coromandel Peninsula and near Te Kūiti in the North Island of New Zealand. This species, along with others in the family, have changed little over the past 200 million years, thus they represent "living fossils".

== Taxonomy ==
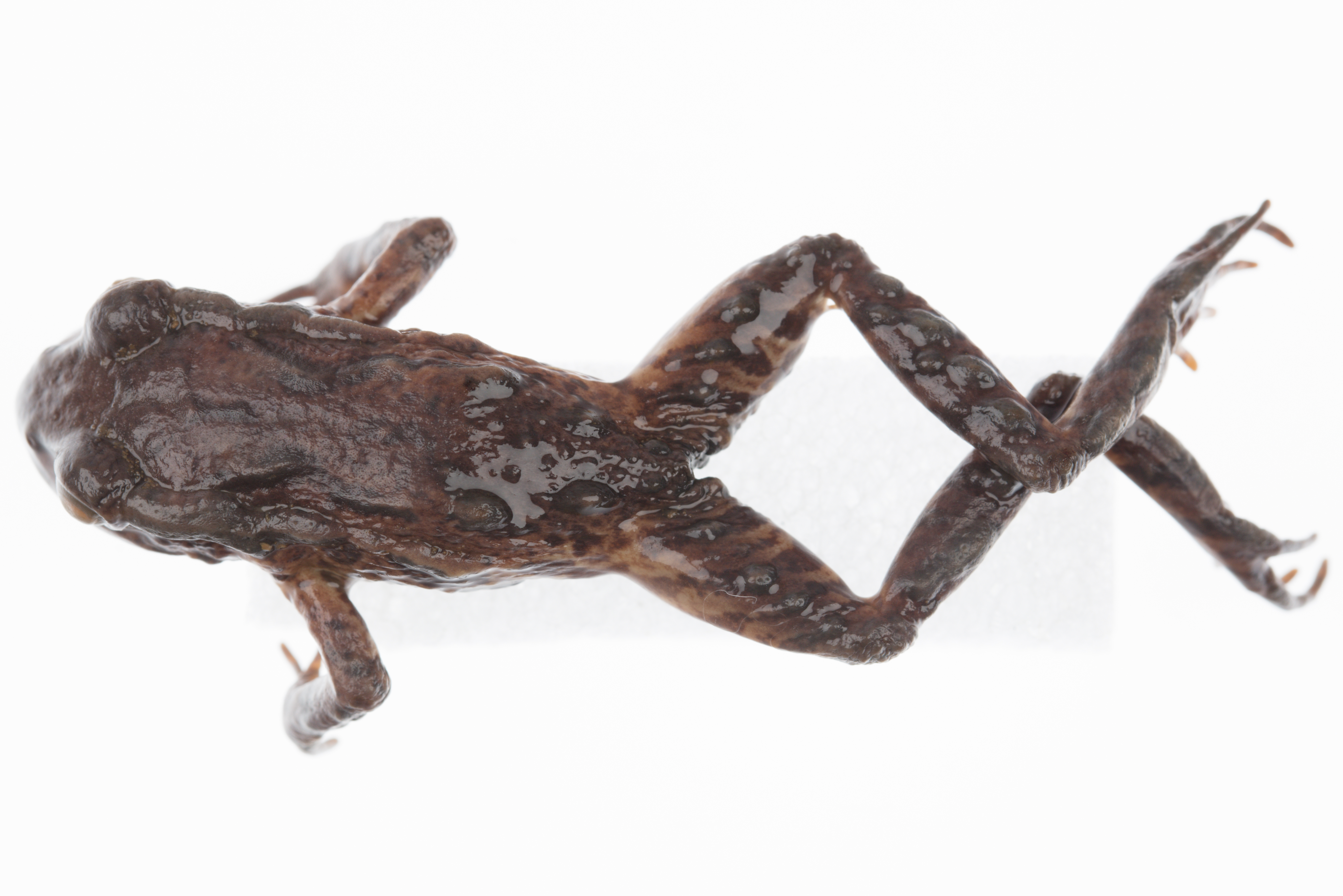
Holotype of Leiopelma archeyi from the collections of Auckland War Memorial Museum

The species was first described by Evan Graham Turbott in 1942, It is named after Sir Gilbert Archey, the former director of the Auckland Institute. The holotype is held at the Auckland War Memorial Museum. The first description of Leiopelma frogs on the Tokatea Ridge of the Coromandel Peninsula, the type locality of Archey's frog, was published by Archey in 1922, which Turbott identified ipso facto as L. archeyi.

Archey's frog is one of only three species found in the Leiopelmatidae family, a basal form of amphibian that diverged at an early stage in the development of frogs. The species does not have many typical traits of frogs; it has no ears, does not vocalise, and has a poor ability to leap. Because of this, the frog is considered to be a living fossil. DNA analysis indicates L. archeyi and L. hochstetteri likely diverged from each other between 40 and 50 million years ago.

== Description ==
Females of the species grow up to 37 mm (1.5 in) in length, while males grow to 31 mm (1.2 in). The frogs have variable colours and patterns, often with a light to dark brown dorsal surface with scattered dark blotches, pink/orange-brown lateral surface, and a black or dark brown ventral surface. The species lacks webbing on their hind feet, they have primarily smooth skin and mostly black eyes. The species can be distinguished from Hochstetter's frog due to its smoother skin, longer digits, typically smaller size and lack of webbed toes on their hind feet.

Colour variation exists between the two populations of Archey's frog: with the Whareorino Forest populations, typically being more colourful than their counterparts on the Coromandel Peninsula, with pink or orange-brown patches on body.

== Behaviour ==
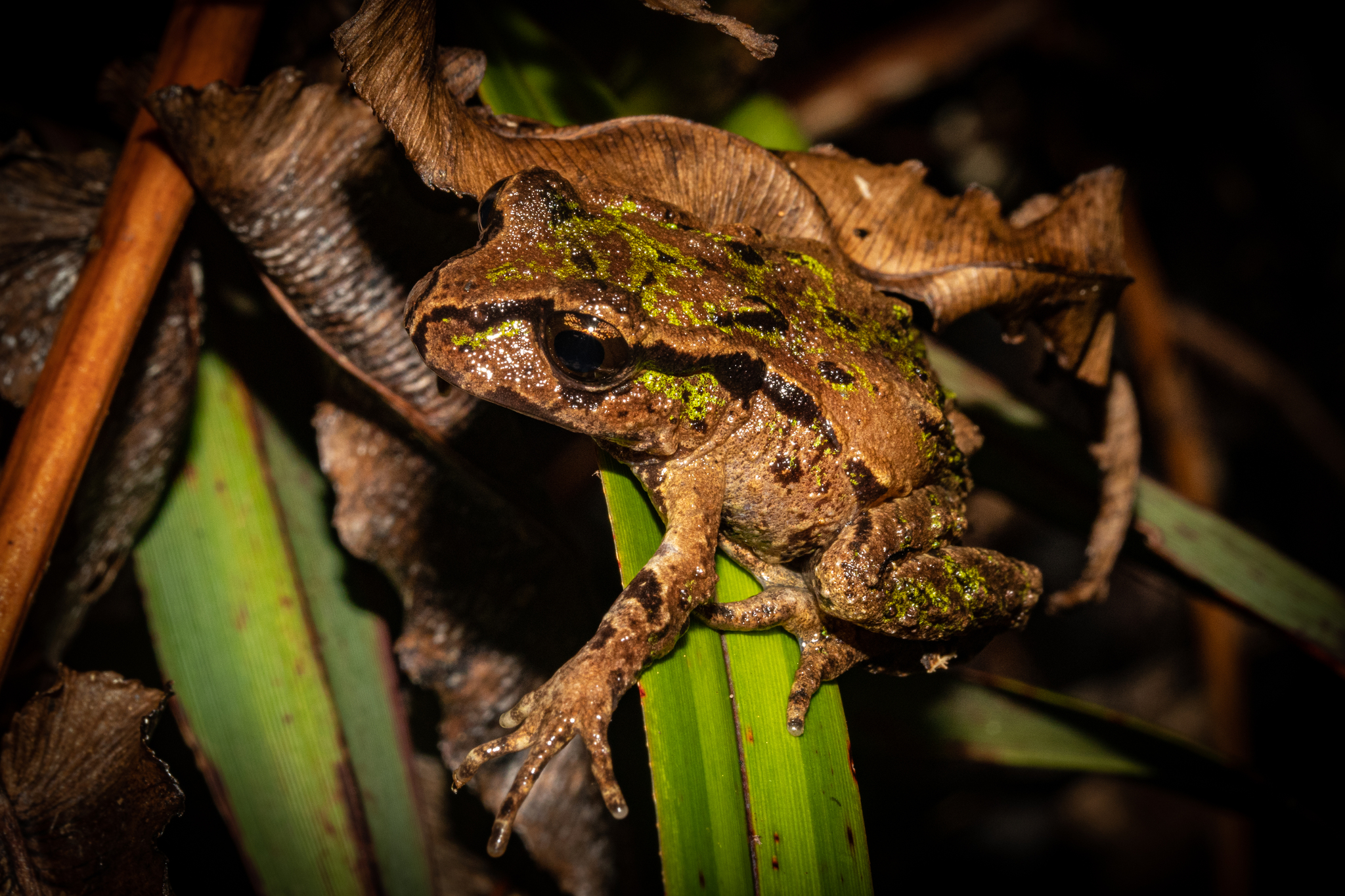
Nocturnally active Leiopelma archeyi seen on the Coromandel Peninsula

Archey's frog is primarily nocturnal, hiding under rocks in the daytime. The species is terrestrial, occasionally spending time in the lower branches of trees, and can live up to 35 years.

Reproduction occurs between September and November, with females lay clutches of translucent eggs, varying between four and 15 eggs and 8–11 mm (0.31–0.43 in) in size between December and February. Reproduction is fully terrestrial; tadpoles develop within gelatinous egg capsules, and upon hatching, tailed froglets crawl onto the male's back and are carried around, and take several weeks to complete metamorphosis. Males are believed to be the primary care providers, and may prepare "nests" they guard for the eggs, secreting antimicrobial peptides onto them, to ensure successful embryonic development. Froglets remain with males for between three and four years.

Adult frogs do not give advertisement vocalisations, but may communicate by chemical signalling. However, frogs sometimes give startle calls when threatened by a predator.

== Distribution and habitat ==
The species is found in two locations: the Coromandel Peninsula, and the Whareorino Forest near Te Kūiti, both areas of the Waikato Region of the North Island, New Zealand. The species typically lives in higher elevations, on ridges away from creeks in high moisture areas of native forest, although in the mid-20th century the species had previously been found at lower elevations.

== Conservation ==
Because populations are rapidly declining, and reproduction is infrequent, the species is at significant risk of imminent extinction. The species is categorised as Nationally Vulnerable under the New Zealand Threat Classification System and as Critically Endangered on the IUCN Red List. It is estimated between 5,000 and 20,000 frogs exist in the wild. Rats and the introduced green and golden bell frog are known to kill Archey's frogs. Introduced predators known to predate other frog species in New Zealand, such as pigs, cats, hedgehogs and ferrets, are also likely to have an impact.

An intensively monitored population in one Coromandel site declined by 88% from 1996 to 2001. The reason for the decline is unknown, but may have been caused by fungal disease.

As first shown by Bruce Waldman, the species appears to have an intrinsically low level of susceptibility to chytridiomycosis. However, frogs in the field show clinical signs, including blisters, that may be associated with other diseases. Nonetheless, despite field observations suggesting that frogs were dying from other causes, New Zealand researchers continued to argue that the species was most at risk from chytridiomycosis and planned their management strategies primarily to mitigate threats from this disease. After his research permits were withdrawn by the Department of Conservation, Waldman subsequently left New Zealand.

A captive-breeding programme was established at the University of Canterbury in 2002 to safeguard the species from disease, and frogs successfully bred. The programme was transferred to Auckland Zoo in 2005, where over half of the frogs, including juveniles bred at the Canterbury facility, died. Some of the remaining frogs produced offspring in December 2012, of which seven still survived as of February, 2013. After 8 years of failed attempts to get the frogs to breed at Auckland Zoo, zookeepers claimed "a massive and internationally important victory". Based on an Auckland Zoo press release that promoted their new public display of adult Archey's frogs, the Auckland Zoo breeding was widely but inaccurately reported as representing the first time the frogs had successfully reproduced in captivity. Auckland Zoo, Otago University, and James Cook University researchers attribute the mortality and reproductive failures at Auckland Zoo in part to metabolic bone disease, which they determined had not been a problem in the Canterbury facility. In 2006, 70 Archey's frogs were translocated to Pureora Forest. However, despite some breeding being observed, only low numbers of frogs have been counted.

== See also ==
- Frogs of New Zealand
