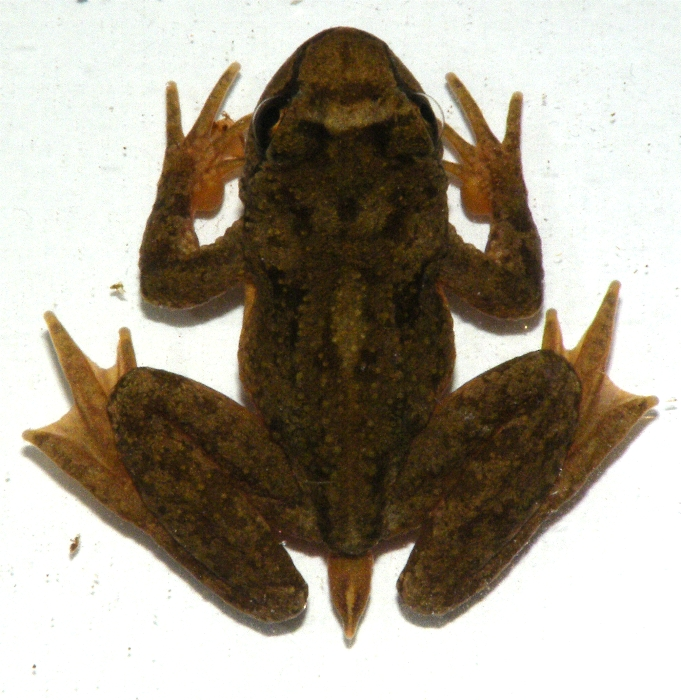

Scientific classification
- Kingdom: Animalia
- Phylum: Chordata
- Class: Amphibia
- Order: Anura
- Suborder: Archaeobatrachia
- Family: Ascaphidae; Fejérváry, 1923
- Genus: Ascaphus; Stejneger, 1899

Species
- Ascaphus montanus (Mittleman and Myers, 1949); Ascaphus truei (Stejneger, 1899)
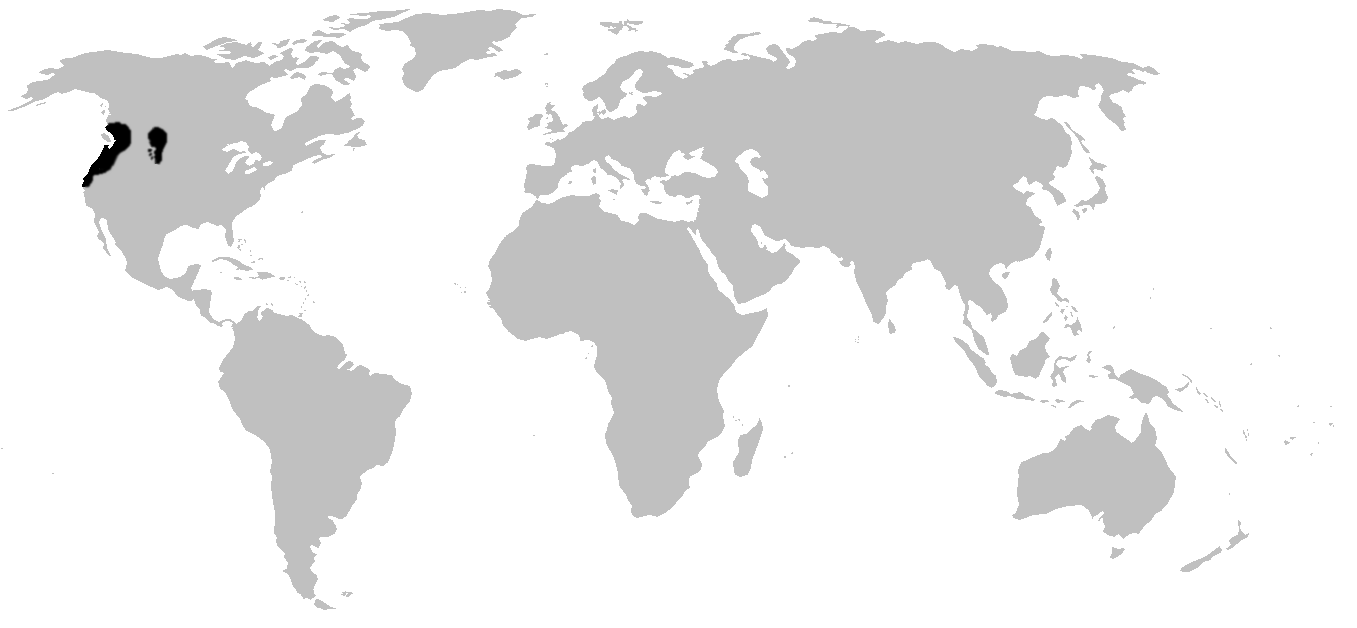
- Distribution of Ascaphidae (in black)

= Tailed frog =

Tailed frogs

Genus of frogs

The tailed frogs are two species of frogs in the genus Ascaphus, the only taxon in the family Ascaphidae /æˈskæfɪdiː/. The "tail" in the name is actually an extension of the male cloaca. The tail is one of two distinctive anatomical features adapting the species to life in fast-flowing streams. These are the only North American frog species that reproduce by internal fertilization. They are among the most primitive known families of frogs.

Its scientific name means 'without a spade', from the privative prefix a- and the Ancient Greek skaphís (σκαφίς, 'spade, shovel'), referring to the metatarsal spade, which these frogs do not have.

== Taxonomy ==
Until 2001, the genus was believed to be monotypic, the single species being the tailed frog (Ascaphus truei Stejneger, 1899). However, in that year, Nielson, Lohman, and Sullivan published evidence that promoted the Rocky Mountain tailed frog (Ascaphus montanus) from a subspecies to its own species. Since then, the former species has been formally called the coastal tailed frog.

The genus Ascaphus, through mtDNA comparisons, has been grouped into a clade with the genus Leiopelma creating a sister taxon to all modern anurans.

== General morphology ==
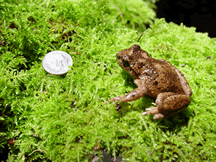
Tailed frog size compared to a dime

The existence of the visible "tail" appendage makes this frog family distinct from all other frogs. It is usually classified in the ancient frog suborder Archaeobatrachia and further organized into a basal clade with Leiopelma that is considered a sister taxon to all other frogs.

The "tail" is found only in males, and is actually part of the cloaca, used to insert sperm into the female during mating. This anatomical feature improves breeding success by minimizing loss of sperm in the turbulent, fast-flowing streams inhabited by this species. Thus, the tailed frogs exhibit internal fertilisation, rather than the external fertilisation found in other frogs.

Ascaphidae and Leiopelmatidae are primitive to almost all other frogs in having nine amphicoelous vertebrae and a caudalipuboischiotibialis tail-wagging muscle in adults, a type of vertebrae seen mostly in fish and early terrestrial tetrapod fossils (such as fossil salamanders and fossil frogs). The joints in amphicoelous vertebrae allow for significant lateral movement of the vertebral column, seen most clearly when fish use their tail to generate propulsive force. An additional plesiomorphy is the presence of free ribs in adults, a characteristic only present in the basal group archaeobatrachia.

Ascaphids lack the ability to vocalise, are small – around 2.5 to 5.0 cm (0.98 to 1.97 in) long – and are found in steep, fast-flowing streams in Montana, Idaho, Washington, Oregon, and northern California in the northwest United States, and southeastern British Columbia (Rocky Mountain Tailed Frog) and coastal BC (Coastal Tailed Frog).

Unique to the tailed frogs is the ability to secrete a series of antimicrobial peptides called ascaphins. These peptides share minimal genetic characteristics with other peptides secreted by frogs, yet show some similarities with antibacterial peptides found in African scorpions Pandinus imperator and Opistophthalmus carinatus. The ascaphin peptides are secreted through the skin and imperative in fighting bacteria such as E. coli and S. aureus.

The tailed frogs share certain characteristics with the Leiopelma, a genus of primitive frogs native to New Zealand, with which they are a phylogenetic sister taxon to all other anurans.

== Mating behaviour ==
When attempting to mate, males will lunge at the female, wrapping a forelimb around them to secure them initially in an inguinal amplexus formation (males wrap their digits around female anterior to the pelvic region, placing their head on the back and close to the rear of the female) and then in a ventral amplexus formation (female is flipped over and male and female venters face each other). From here, the male inserts the "tail" into the female, and squeezes the female to gain leverage before thrusting. During this process the female is relatively still, occasionally kicking during the insertion process.

In some situations there is male-male competition for the female. In these situations, both males compete to enter the amplexus formation, eventually one establishing a better hold on the female and expelling the other male from the breeding process. Usually the male that is larger is more likely to succeed.

== General habitat ==
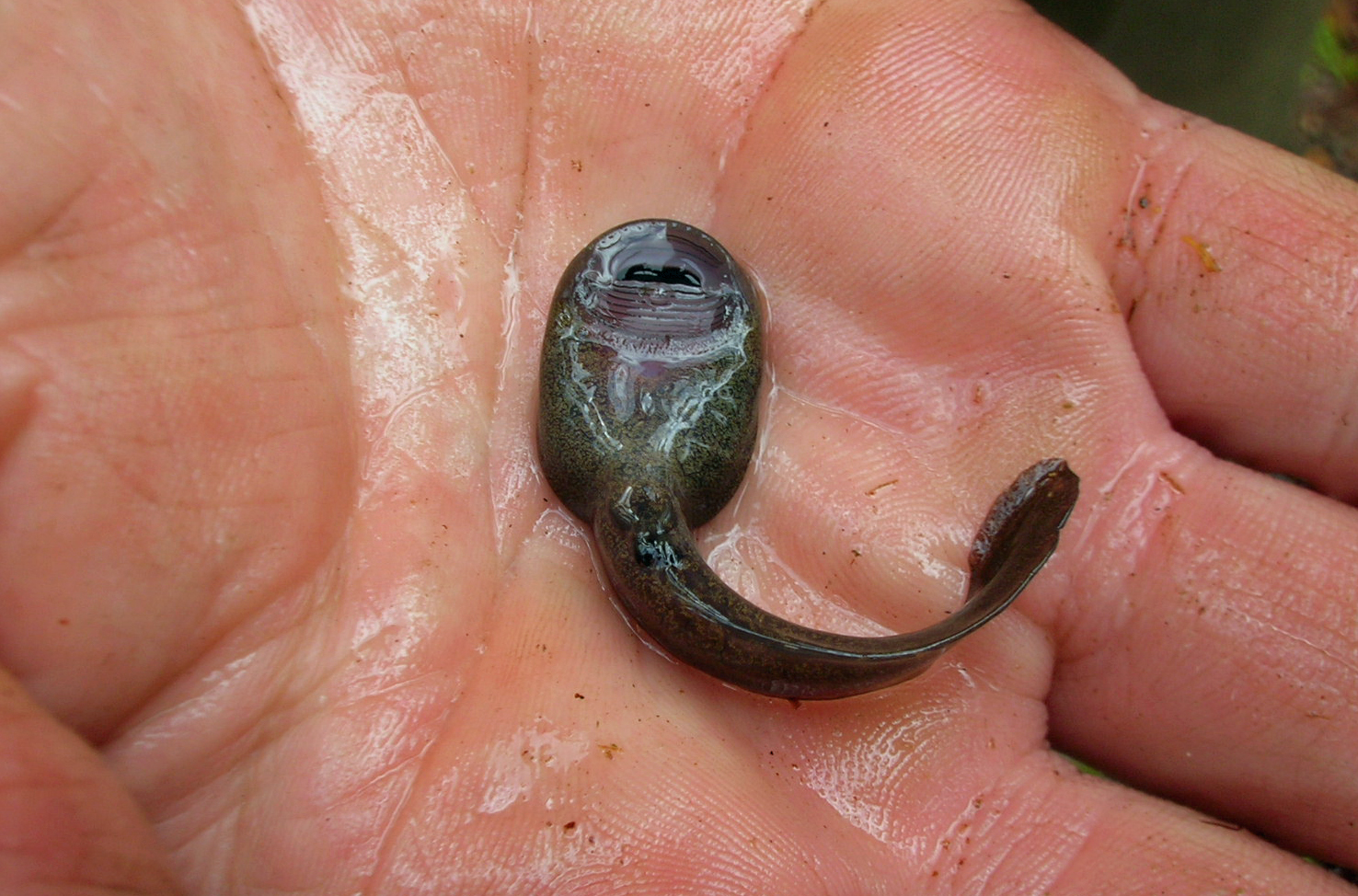
Ascaphus montanus tadpole (supine position), showing the large oral sucker

The habitat of the tailed frog is cold, fast-moving streams with cobblestone bottoms. They are mostly aquatic, but adults may emerge during cool, wet conditions to forage terrestrially. Breeding season lasts from May through September, and females deposit their eggs in strings under rocks in fast-moving streams. Larvae take one to four years to metamorphose in the cool, fast-moving mountain streams. The amount of cobbles and fines (sand and similarly sized fine particles) in streams have been shown to be good indicators of tadpole abundance, with tadpole abundance being inversely proportional to concentration of fines and proportional to concentration of cobbles.

Thermal tolerance range in adults is exceptionally low relative to other North American anurans, with eggs rarely found above 20 °C and adults and larvae regularly migrating along microhabitats to reach temperatures below 20 °C whenever possible. It would appear that they prefer temperatures 16 °C and below. Eggs develop best at temperatures between 5° and 13.5 °C.

Because of this very narrow thermal tolerance, adults may exhibit philopatry where temperatures are stable and low. However, it has also been hypothesized that they may migrate to colder waters in autumn. Unfortunately, movements and migrational habits in Ascaphus have not been well documented, preventing any conclusive statements on migratory behavior or philopatry from being made with confidence.

Adults forage primarily terrestrially along stream banks, but also occasionally feed underwater. A wide variety of food items is taken, including both aquatic and terrestrial larval and adult insects, other arthropods (especially spiders), and snails. Tadpoles consume small quantities of filamentous green algae and desmids. Large quantities of conifer pollen are consumed seasonally by tadpoles.

During the day, adults seek cover under submerged substrates in the stream, or occasionally under similar surface objects close to the stream. Individuals have also been found in crevices in spray-drenched cliff walls near waterfalls. During winter, individuals are less active, especially inland, and appear to retreat beneath large logs and boulders. Tadpoles require cool streams with smooth-surfaced stones with a minimum diameter of 55 mm (2.2 in). Tadpoles probably spend most of their time attached to such substrates by a large oral sucker. The large, sucker-like mouth parts of the tadpoles are a second distinctive feature of the species, enabling survival in turbulent water unsuitable for other frogs. They prefer turbulent water to smooth, swiftly flowing water.
