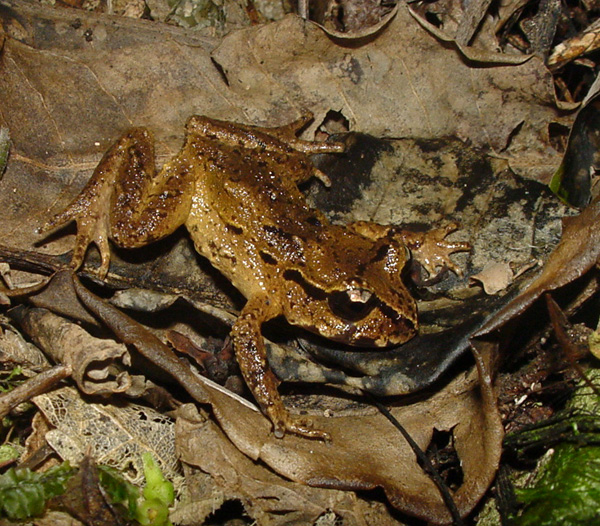

Conservation status
- Vulnerable (IUCN 3.1)

- Nationally Critical (NZ TCS)

Scientific classification
- Kingdom: Animalia
- Phylum: Chordata
- Class: Amphibia
- Order: Anura
- Family: Leiopelmatidae
- Genus: Leiopelma
- Species: L. hamiltoni

Binomial name
- Leiopelma hamiltoni McCulloch, 1919
- Distribution of Hamilton's frog Known native range Native range (translocated) Translocated populations in Wellington aren't shown

= Hamilton's frog =

Species of amphibian

The Hamilton's frog (Leiopelma hamiltoni) is a primitive frog native to New Zealand, one of only three extant species belonging to the family Leiopelmatidae. New Zealand's frog species all are in the family Leiopelmatidae. The male remains with the eggs to protect them and allows the tadpoles to climb onto his back where they are kept moist. It is named in honour of Harold Hamilton, the collector of the type specimen. The holotype is in the collection of the Museum of New Zealand Te Papa Tongarewa.

== Description ==
They are mostly light brown in colour, although some green individuals have also been observed. A single dark stripe runs along each side of the head and through the eye. There is no webbing between the hind toes, and the fingers are not webbed. These frogs have a snout length of 5.5 mm, and thighs that can reach up to 14.8 mm.

Leiopelma hamiltoni is a very small frog species, with males being even smaller than females. Males have a snout-vent length of up to 43 millimeters and up to 49 millimeters for females. They are typically a brown color which can range from very light brown to almost black. Some have also been spotted having a green color. They also have black spots covering their bodies. Unlike other frogs, they have very little to no webbing on their hind toes and also do not have external eardrums. They have a row-like design down the back and sides of their body which are made up of callus-like glands in their skin. This coloration allows the frogs to blend in well with their surroundings. These rows start right at the back side of the eye, with the middle row being the largest and most distinct. The end of this middle row terminates at what scientists called the paratoid gland. The lines are also seen on the legs, feet, and arms but are less prominent than the ones on its back.

== Distribution ==
Hamilton's frog live only on a small rocky area on mammal-free Stephens Island in the Cook Strait. Sub-fossils indicate Hamilton's frog once lived throughout the lower North Island and upper South Island. They live around rocky, moist and grassy areas.

Leiopelma hamiltoni are typically found on the Stephens and Maud Islands, located in the Marlborough Sounds region of New Zealand. They are also present in Karori from population in Zealandia. Maud island is very small with steep hills, only spanning about 760 acres. The estimated population size of Hamilton's frog on Maud Island is around 19,000, with the minimum population estimate being around 6,500. The population is much smaller on Stephans Island, with a population estimate of about 200 to 300 individuals. They reside in a small patch at the peak of Stephan's Island which is known as “frog bank”. However, fossils show that the species may have previously had a larger range, with fossils being found scattered all over New Zealand. Remains have been found at Waitoma, Hawkes Bay, and Wairarapa, which are all located on the North Island of New Zealand. Much of the island has been modified due to farming, forcing all the frogs to live in the same section of rainforest that remains.

== Behavior ==
These frogs are nocturnal, so they are the most active at night. They will occasionally come out during the day to feed, as long as there are humid and moist conditions. They prefer cool and misty nights and are most active when temperatures are between 8 degrees celsius to 14 degrees celsius. They do not travel far, and will usually stay within a 5 meter radius for multiple years at a time. Individuals will also hide and rest in the same spot, typically in a damp rock or log crevice. The frogs will co-habit these retreat sites, with multiple frogs residing inside at a time. This species typically live very closely to one another which would signal sociality. However, since their habitats have become so small, it is unclear whether they do this for social reasons or simply because there is not much space to spread out. Leiopelma hamiltoni also live for an extremely long time, compared to other frog species. Tagged frogs had been found to have lived up to 30 years after their initial tagging. Scientists have estimated that their likely life span is around 23–33 years. They also have unique hunting habits, as they catch their prey by catching it directly with their mouths, rather than with their tongues.

=== Habitat ===
Hamilton's frog is a nocturnal ground-dwelling species. There is growing observational evidence that it may live in some trees as well. It shelters in damp crevices during the day, and prefers rocks and boulders for survival. They can be difficult to locate because of this night-time activity, plus they are well camouflaged, do not croak, and are very rare.

The community of Leiopelma hamiltoni that live on Maud Island are not evenly distributed throughout the rainforests. They typically live in much lower sections of the forest, around 300 meters above sea level, as there are more rocks and materials to hide in. Hamilton's frogs are a terrestrial species and are typically found in the coastal rain forests on this island or in deep boulder banks. They are nocturnal, so during the day they tend to reside in dark and damp crevices, which is why they are commonly found in and near boulder banks where they can hide under rocks and logs and stay deep under the canopy of the trees.

=== Diet ===
Hamilton's frogs are insectivores. They feed on fruit flies, small crickets, moths, and springtails. Juveniles with a snout-vent length of 20 mm or less lack teeth, and thus are required to eat soft-bodied arthropods like mites and fruit flies.[20]

Leiopelma hamiltoni are insectivores and feed solely on insects, including crickets, flies, moths, springtails, and other small bugs. Their tongues are stuck to the top of their mouths, so they are unable to catch insects with their tongue like many other frog species do. Instead they have to catch prey with their mouths directly. Younger frogs have to eat small insects as they have smaller mouths with fewer teeth, so young Hamilton Frogs tend to eat mites and fruit flies.

=== Reproduction ===
Females can lay between 11 and 15 eggs, which tend to be 9.6 mm in length. They do not go through tadpole stages, but instead they develop totally within a gelatinous capsule in the egg, hatching out as froglets. They take around three years to reach maturity.

Leiopelma hamiltoni breed in amplexus and fertilization takes place externally while the male and female frog are in contact with one another. They lay their eggs in cool, moist, areas on land, typically in depressions under rocks and logs. The eggs tend to stick together in clusters of around seven to nineteen. There are three layers to the eggs. These layers include an inner vitelline membrane, a gel like middle layer, and a protective coat on the surface. The parents, but usually the males, will often seek out and find the site where they want to lay their eggs. They will then occupy and guard the site where they will lay eggs for weeks or sometimes months before the eggs are even fertilized. The species on Maud Island will typically lay their eggs in December each year. Once the eggs are laid, the male will stay with them, protecting them from any potential predators. The eggs take between 7–9 weeks to fully develop and hatch. Once they hatch, they do not immediately start swimming like most tadpole frog species. Instead, they climb onto their father's back and stay with him while they continue to develop there. They are very inactive while they are with the father, as he carries them around everywhere. After the frogs hatch, it takes them around 3–4 years to reach full maturity. During their development they have narrow fin tails and their hindlimbs develop first. Only their forelimbs are covered by the gular fold.

=== Communication ===
This species of frog does not have any eardrums or earholes on the outside of its head, so they are unable to hear noises unless they are at an extremely low frequency. Since they can't hear, they use the odors emitted from its feces in order to communicate with other members. The chemical make up for each frog is slightly different, so the odor that comes from it is also distinct for each frog. This is how they can distinguish between relatives and how to tell members of their species apart from potential threats. They also use the smell of their feces to claim territories and also ward off predators.

== Defense ==
Hamilton's frogs are not able to make a sound in order to communicate with each other or to ward off predators. However, when they are attacked, they can make a squeaking or chirping sound. This squeaking sound varies between individuals. The pitch of the squeak seemed to be inversely correlated with the size of the frog. Smaller frogs have higher squeaks. Also, temperature affects how long the frog will squeak for. In colder temperatures, they will squeak for longer amounts of time. The squeaks are suspected of coming from forced expulsion of air from their lungs when startled, as they have no true voice box. Other than in the case of a predator attack, Leiopelma hamiltoni make no other sounds. If they are attacked, they will get into a stiff-legged stance and try to make themselves look as big as possible. They will extend their legs and raise their body, and then butt their heads. This head-butting, accompanied with the striped glands along its back, are components of an anti-predator defense adapted by terrestrial species. They will also emit a mal-tasting secretion from their granular glands if they are attacked to prevent a predator from eating it.

== Predators ==
Some predators of Leiopelma hamiltoni are New Zealand tuatara, which is a type of reptile, and black rats. The black rats that live on the island are non-native to the area the frogs live in and pose as a severe threat to their survival.

=== Chemical signaling ===
Hamilton's frog can communicate with other frogs through chemical signaling through fecal smells. This was determined in a 2002 study done where any other sensory signal was eliminated, so chemical signaling was the only response to the frogs’ behavior. Fecal signals identified home territories. This signaling can be used to determine if there is an intrusion into one's territory by another member of the species: the intruder will leave and retreat if it is smaller than the frog whose territory it inhabits. Many anurans may use chemical signaling: even though several frogs use croaking and other auditory communication, chemical signaling may be important as an addition or even a substitute in quieter or silent species. The frogs will strategically deposit feces in response to certain signals. These fecal signals alert others of home ranges and social status. Also, the feces signaling can ward off competitors and intruders. The feces typically will repel a comparator as long as the competitor is smaller than the individual who produced the feces. Also, feces repel individuals from farther locations better than local individuals. Therefore, size plays an important role in interactions and communications between Leiopelma hamiltoni. Size indicates how many resources an individual might have or how strong one might be. Size is an honest signal as there is a correlation between body size and metabolism and gland activity or dietary differences.

== Conservation ==
Farming and deforestation on Maud Island has destroyed much of the land that the frogs used to live on, however they have managed to keep a stable number on their own in the cluster of land that they currently reside in. The frogs on Stephans Island are endangered however. They are at risk due to increase in predators, as species like the black rat have been introduced to the island. Much of their forest has also been destroyed, so they do not have much space to exist. They are only able to reside at the very top of Stephans Island, as that is the only cluster of trees on the island. Conservationsists have tried translocating groups of these frogs to other areas, in hopes that they can prosper and reproduce in a different environment. They have also built a fence around the “frog bank” on Stephans Island to keep predators away.

The Hamilton's frog two main predators are the native tuatara (Sphenodon punctatus) and the introduced black rat (Rattus rattus). Both of these two predators have caused the Hamilton's frog population to drop to less than 300. It is also vulnerable to the chytrid fungus (Batrachochytrium dendrobatidis). Habitat loss is another large area of concern for this frog. Because they may span a wide variety of vertical spaces, both tree and ground are vulnerable areas that are subject to change and endanger Hamilton's frogs.

In August 2018 the Department of Conservation (DOC) classified the Hamilton's frog as Nationally Critical under the New Zealand Threat Classification System.

=== Protection efforts ===
New Zealand has been protecting the Hamilton's frog species since 1921. A tuatara fence has also been built to stop tuatara from getting through. There is population monitoring also in place. There are plans to move some of the population to another island.

In August 2024 Hamilton's frogs were released into Wellington wildlife sanctuary Zealandia, after a purpose built boardwalk was constructed to allow foot traffic without disrupting the habitat or having frogs climb onto the pathway.
