= Oligosoma taumakae =

Conservation status
- Endangered (IUCN 3.1)

Scientific classification
- Kingdom: Animalia
- Phylum: Chordata
- Class: Reptilia
- Order: Squamata
- Family: Scincidae
- Genus: Oligosoma
- Species: O. taumakae

Binomial name
- Oligosoma taumakae Chapple & Patterson, 2007
- Distribution of Oligosoma taumakae on a map of the South Island

Species of lizard

Oligosoma taumakae, the Open Bay Island(s) skink, or Taumaka skink, is a species of skink. It was described from the Open Bay Islands, off the west coast of the South Island of New Zealand.

This species is diagnosed on the basis of several morphological characteristics, and its specific status is supported by mitochondrial sequence data (ND2, ND4). The new species appears to be most closely related to Oligosoma acrinasum, Oligosoma infrapunctatum, Oligosoma otagense and Oligosoma waimatense. Predation by a flightless rail, the weka, which is native to New Zealand, but was introduced to the Open Bay Islands, is a major conservation concern.

Until recently known only from the Open Bay Islands (both Taumaka and Popotai Islands), the species has subsequently been discovered on two apparently predator-free vegetated rock stacks located off the coast of Barn Bay, 52 km southwest of the Open Bay Islands.

== Physical characteristics ==
The maximum snout–vent length of this skink is 96 mm. The tail is longer than the SVL.

The colour of the back can be many shades of brown, though usually olive with dark-brown to black speckling on top. The sides are dark brown, with black and white speckling being bordered by grey markings. Their eyes are dark-brown. They have 5 scales just above the eye, forming an eyebrow shape.

== Conservation status ==
As of 2012 the Department of Conservation (DOC) classified the Oligosoma taumakae as Nationally Endangered under the New Zealand Threat Classification System.
