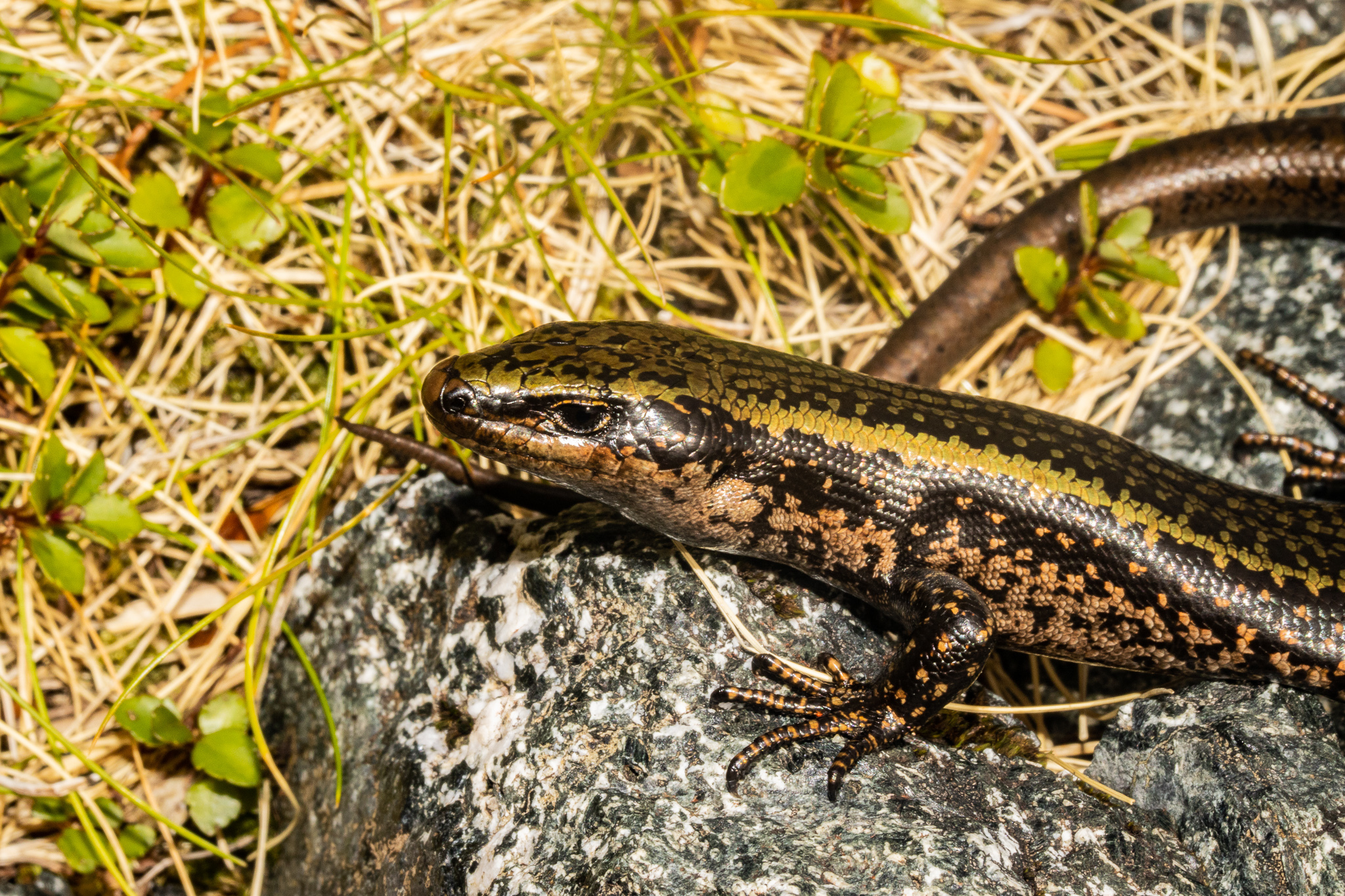

Conservation status
- Critically Endangered (IUCN 3.1)

Scientific classification
- Kingdom: Animalia
- Phylum: Chordata
- Class: Reptilia
- Order: Squamata
- Family: Scincidae
- Genus: Oligosoma
- Species: O. pikitanga

Binomial name
- Oligosoma pikitanga Bell & Patterson, 2008
- Distribution of the Sinbad skink on a map of the South Island Known native range

= Sinbad skink =

Species of lizard

The Sinbad skink (Oligosoma pikitanga) is a rare species of medium-sized skink endemic to New Zealand where it lives in an alpine habitat in Sinbad Gully, in Fiordland National Park.

== Habitat ==
It is one of two species of New Zealand skink found in the Fiordland region of the South Island that lives exclusively in the alpine zone, the other being the closely related and morphologically similar Barrier skink, Oligosoma judgei. The species was not recorded until 2004 and was formally described in 2008 - the Sinbad skink is thought to be very rare and is viewed to be at risk of extinction as a result of the predations of invasive mammalian species such as rats and stoats.

The specific epithet pikitanga is a Māori-language word meaning "mountain climber", and is a reference to the vertiginous alpine habitat of the species. The species was first recorded in 2004 by New Zealand herpetologist Tony Jewell and it was formally described in 2008; the expedition which discovered this species also found another species of skink (the as yet undescribed "Mahogany skink") and several new species of invertebrates in Sinbad Gully; all new to science.

== Physical characteristics ==
The Sinbad skink is a medium to large sized skink and may grow to an SVL of 91mm with a total length of up to 200mm. The toes and tail are very long and the upper surface colouration is black on the back with prominent green speckles, varying to predominantly green with black mottling. The sides are black and spotted irregularly with pink or grey and the belly is a vivid orange colour. This last feature ensures easy distinction from other, similar skink species found in southern New Zealand.

It is thought to be viviparous (give birth to live young) like almost every other Oligosoma species. Sinbad skinks are agile and fast moving and are thought to be diurnal and avid sun baskers. Despite this, individuals can be hard to find, keeping a low profile amongst low vegetation and seldom venturing out into the open. The elongate body shape and relatively high scale counts suggest a saxicolous (rock dwelling) existence similar to that seen in closely related species with similar features such as the grand skink and scree skink. The striking green colouration also suggests a strong association with the vegetation of its habitat. Very little is known about the Sinbad skink and the incredibly harsh weather conditions in Sinbad Gully - which has an annual rainfall up to 12 metres a year and an average year round temperature of just 6.5 degrees Celsius - as well as the dangerous nature of this skink's cliffside habitat mean that its behaviour is very poorly known.

== Conservation status ==
A Department of Conservation (DOC) meeting in 2007 classified the species as being of "high regional priority" and as requiring urgent surveys, research and conservation action. As of 2012 this species was classified as Nationally Endangered under the New Zealand Threat Classification System.
