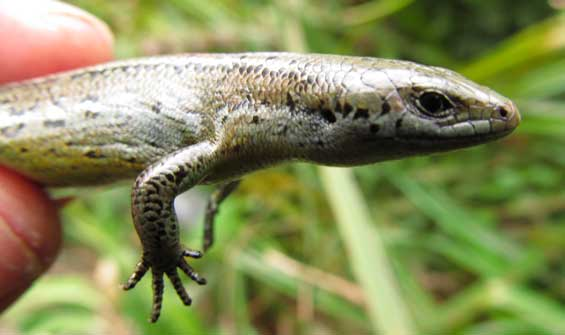

Conservation status
- Vulnerable (IUCN 3.1)

Scientific classification
- Kingdom: Animalia
- Phylum: Chordata
- Class: Reptilia
- Order: Squamata
- Family: Scincidae
- Genus: Oligosoma
- Species: O. tekakahu

Binomial name
- Oligosoma tekakahu Chapple, Bell, Chapple, Miller, Patterson & Daugherty, 2011
- Distribution of Oligosoma tekakahu on a map of the South Island

Synonyms
- Oligosoma inconspicuum 'Te Kakahu'; Oligosoma sp. 6 (Te Kakahu skink)

= Te Kakahu skink =

Species of lizard

The Te Kakahu skink (Oligosoma tekakahu) is a critically endangered species of skink native to New Zealand. When discovered, the entire species was inhabiting a single patch of clifftop vegetation on Chalky Island in Fiordland National Park.

== Discovery ==
The Te Kakahu skink was discovered in 2002 by members of the Department of Conservation (DOC) kākāpō recovery team. Sixteen skinks were collected in 2008, and the species was formally described in 2011 and named Oligosoma tekakahu.

Its species name, tekakahu, comes from the Māori name of Chalky Island, Te Kākahu-o-Tamatea, or "Tamatea's cloak", referring to the oral tradition that this island was where the explorer Tamatea dried his cloak after being drenched by the sea. Although the Māori word kākahu or cloak is spelled with a macron, the skink's name is usually spelled without.

== Appearance ==
Although very similar to the cryptic skink (O. inconspicuum) and the southern skink (Oligosoma notosaurus), the Te Kakahu skink is genetically distinct. It is sturdier and has a comparatively larger head than other related Oligosoma species in the cryptic-skink complex. It is predominantly chestnut brown and glossy with small black markings on its back – either individual flecks or the trace of a mid-dorsal stripe – and a darker stripe down each side. One distinguishing feature are the minimal projecting scales on the interior edge of its small ear opening.

== Habitat ==
This species is recorded as inhabiting just one small site above windswept chalk cliffs on the northwestern coast of Chalky Island, about 130–140 m above sea level. Known as "the blowout", this stony area has had most of the soil removed by wind and only has low vegetation. The skinks are centred on a 50 m² patch of low scrub, mostly sedges (Carex), Rytidosperma, and the low-growing shrubs Olearia avicennifolia and O. oporina.

Stoats were not eradicated from the island until 1999, so this is likely to be a last refuge from which the skink population is now expanding. It is possible this species still exists in similar habitat on nearby islands or the mainland.

== Conservation status ==
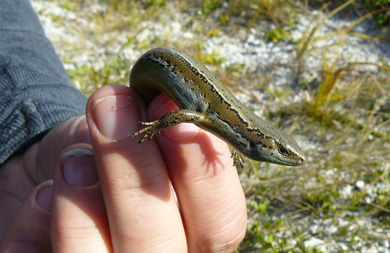
Te Kakahu skink (Oligosoma tekakahu) on Chalky Island

In 2012 the Department of Conservation reclassified the Te Kakahu skink as "Nationally Critical" under the New Zealand Threat Classification System. It met the criteria for Nationally Critical threat status by occupying a total area of less than 1 hectare. The Te Kakahu skink is considered conservation dependent, in partial decline, and found only in one location.

Chalky Island has never had rats, mice, possums, or deer, and since DOC eradicated stoats with a trapping network in 1999 it has been free from introduced mammalian predators. Te Kakahu skinks are only preyed on by New Zealand falcons (Falco novaezeelandiae). The skinks are active in daytime, sunbathing for long periods, and display little fear of novel species. The single population of skinks remain vulnerable, as an arrival of stoats or an accidental fire would threaten the entire species.

== Conservation efforts ==
In February 2013 DOC staff counted and studied a total of 160 skinks from the Chalky Island site, ageing, sexing, and measuring each individual. A follow-up survey in February–March 2016 confirmed that a relatively abundant population existed to support a harvest of skinks for translocation. A release site was chosen on nearby predator-free Anchor Island, and 99 skinks were transferred in February 2018. Every skink was photographed and its unique scale patterns noted. Anchor Island is home to several endangered birds, such as kākāpō, little spotted kiwi, and mohua, but has no other skink species.
