= Oligosoma roimata =

Conservation status
- Range Restricted (NZ TCS)

Scientific classification
- Kingdom: Animalia
- Phylum: Chordata
- Class: Reptilia
- Order: Squamata
- Family: Scincidae
- Genus: Oligosoma
- Species: O. roimata

Binomial name
- Oligosoma roimata Patterson, Hitchmough & Chapple, 2013
- Distribution of Oligosoma roimata on a map of the North Island

Species of lizard

The Aorangi skink (Oligosoma roimata) is a species of lizards in the skink family. The species is native to New Zealand.

== Distribution ==
In New Zealand O. roimata is endemic to the Poor Knights Islands, off the east coast of the Northland region. It is known to be present on the island of Aorangi.

== Related species ==
Closely related species also present on Aorangi Island include Oligosoma hardyi.

== Relationships ==
O. roimata is most closely related to Oligosoma ornatum, which is a variable species complex. Although morphological divergence is very minor, there is 8.7–9.8% sequence divergence (using the ND2 mitochondrial gene). O. roimata has been previously referred to informally as Cyclodina ornata "Poor Knights", Cyclodina ornata "PKI", and Oligosoma ornatum "Poor Knights Islands".

== Diagnosis ==
From Oligosoma ornatum, the species can be recognised by its white venter. The venter of O. ornatum is usually flushed with variable colour, but may sometimes be white or cream. The ear opening is slightly smaller than that of O. ornatum. The maximum snout-vent length (SVL) of about 63 millimetres (2.5 in) is much less than that of O. ornatum which is about 80–85 millimetres (3.1–3.3 in).
