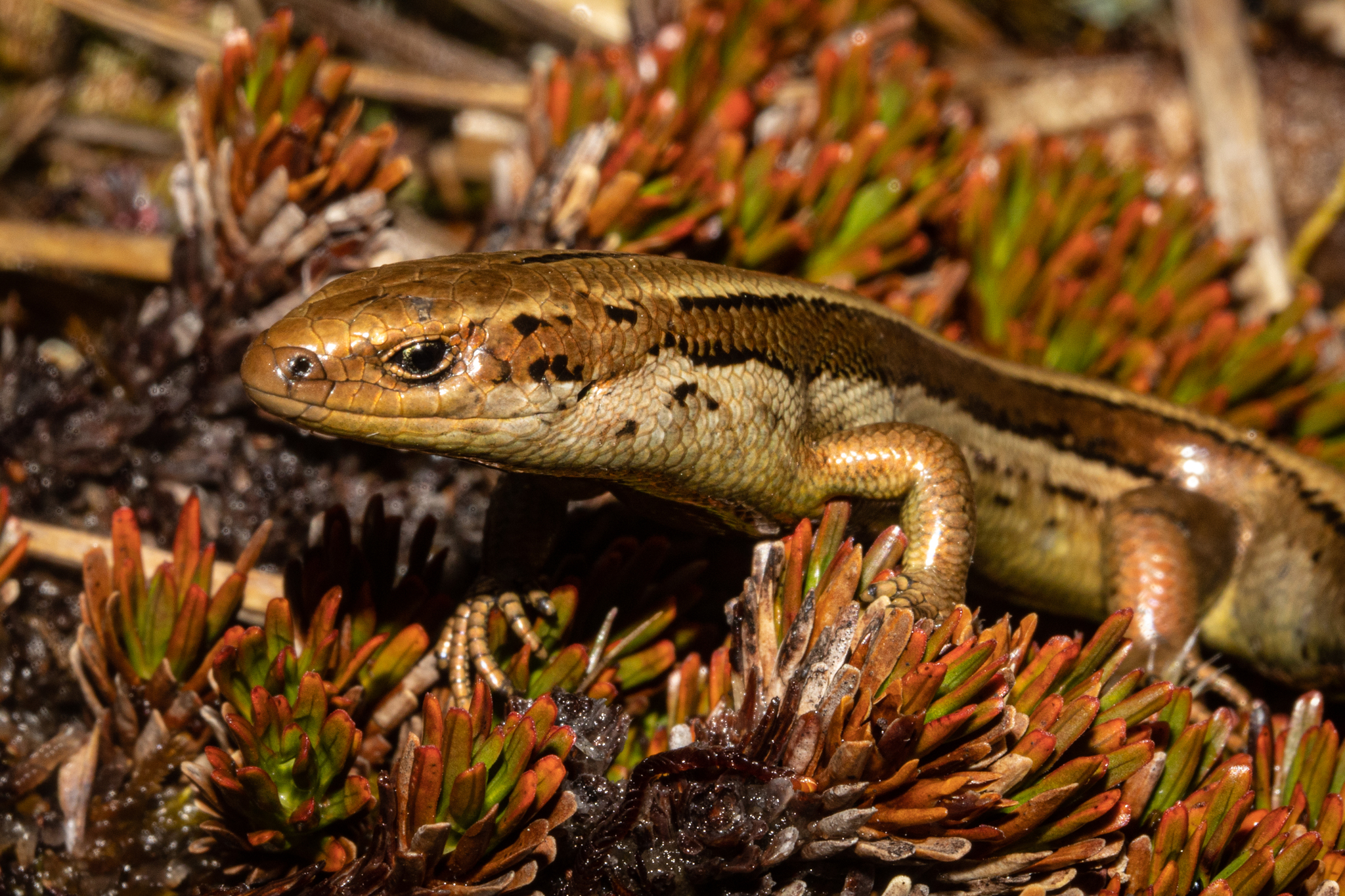

Conservation status
- Nationally Vulnerable (NZ TCS)

Scientific classification
- Kingdom: Animalia
- Phylum: Chordata
- Class: Reptilia
- Order: Squamata
- Family: Scincidae
- Genus: Oligosoma
- Species: O. stenotis

Binomial name
- Oligosoma stenotis (Patterson & Daugherty, 1994)
- Distribution of the small-eared skink on a map of Stewart Island Known native range

= Small-eared skink =

A rare species of lizard found only on Rakiura | Stewart Island.

The small-eared skink (Oligosoma stenotis) is a species of skink endemic to New Zealand. It was originally described in 1994. As at 2021 this species was classified as being Nationally Vulnerable under the New Zealand Threat Classification System.

== Taxonomy ==
It was first described in 1994 by Geoff Patterson and Charles Daugherty.

== Description ==
The small-eared skink is a moderately small (80 mm snout to vent) skink, that lives in one of the most inhospitable (to lizards) environments on earth. O. stenotis can be distinguished from the other four or five species of skink on Stewart Island by its very small ear (hence the name stenotis), and also occasionally by the number of scales on mid-row in the back, and by the coloration. It is occasionally a very bright green, which can sometimes be confused for the aptly named O. chloronoton, which means 'green backed' in Greek.

== Distribution ==
This species is found only in New Zealand.

== Conservation status ==
In 2021, the Department of Conservation (Te Papa Atawhai) changed the threat classification of the small-eared skink from At Risk - Nationally Uncommon to Threatened - Nationally Vulnerable under the New Zealand Threat Classification System.
