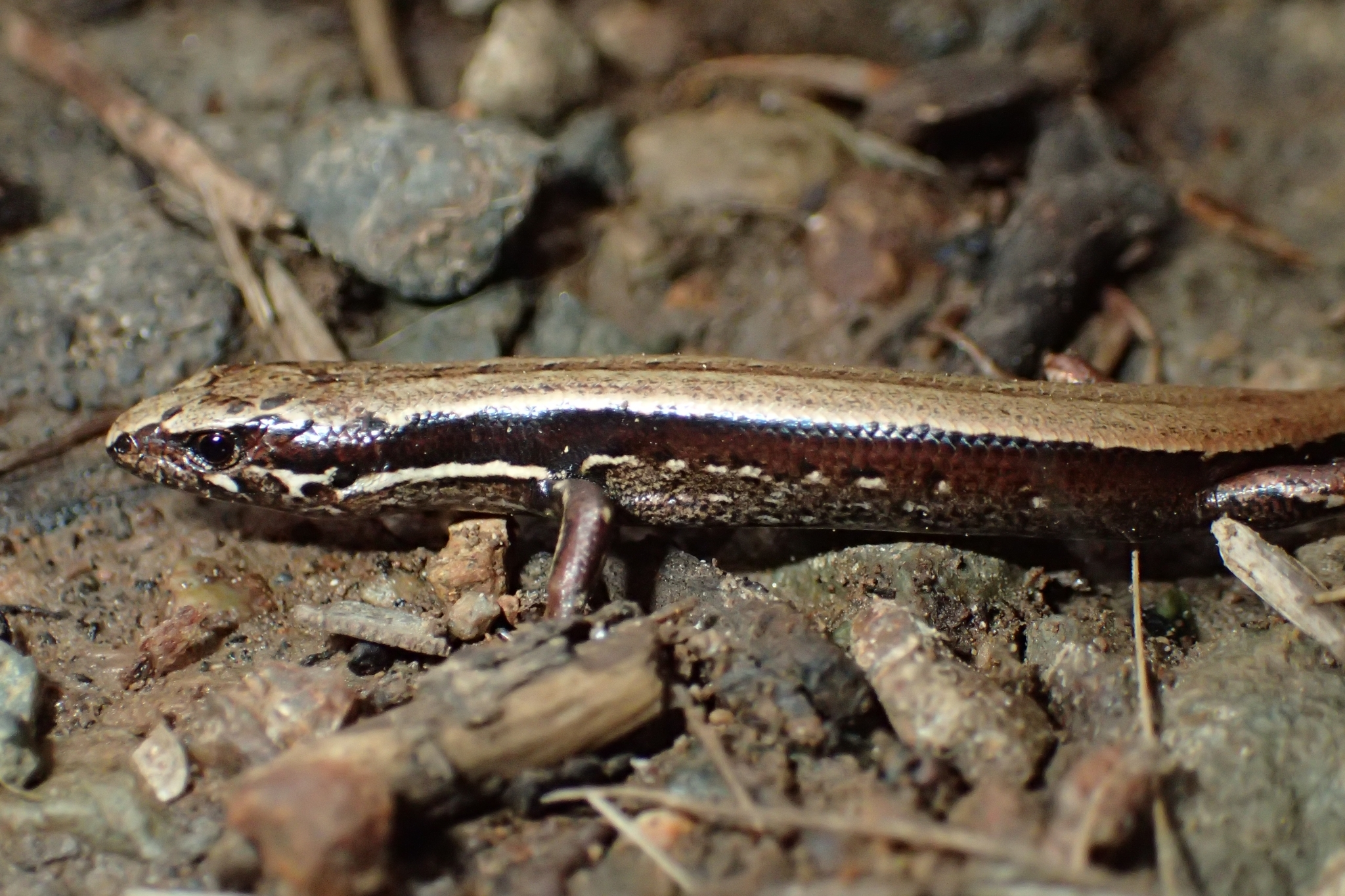
- Oligosoma kakerakau seen in Northland, New Zealand

Conservation status
- Nationally Critical (NZ TCS)

Scientific classification
- Kingdom: Animalia
- Phylum: Chordata
- Class: Reptilia
- Order: Squamata
- Family: Scincidae
- Genus: Oligosoma
- Species: O. kakerakau

Binomial name
- Oligosoma kakerakau Barr, Chapple, Hitchmough, Patterson & Ngatiwai Trust Board, 2021
- Distribution of Oligosoma kakerakau on a map of the North Island Known native range

= Oligosoma kakerakau =

Species of lizard

Oligosoma kakerakau, known as the Whirinaki skink and the Kakerakau skink, is a species of skink found in New Zealand. First observed at Whirinaki Te Pua-a-Tāne Conservation Park in 2003, the skink is mainly known for a population occurring at Bream Head Scenic Reserve near Whangārei. Oligosoma kakerakau has a distinctive teardrop marking that distinguishes it from other similar members of Oligosoma.

== Taxonomy ==
Oligosoma kakerakau was first formally described in 2021. The first sighting of the species occurred in 2003, when a single individual was seen at Whirinaki Te Pua-a-Tāne Conservation Park. Until 2021, the species was given the interim name Oligosoma "Whirinaki". Phylogenetic analysis indicates that the species' closest known relative is Oligosoma zelandicum, while Oligosoma striatum and Oligosoma homalonotum are more distant relatives. O. kakerakau and O. zelandicum are hypothesised to have diverged due to sea level changes during the Pliocene era.

== Description ==
Oligosoma kakerakau has a snout–vent length of 70 mm (2.8 in). The species has a distinctive teardrop-shaped marking below its eye and mid-lateral stripe.

== Distribution and habitat ==
The species is known to occur at Bream Head Scenic Reserve near Whangārei in Northland, and at Whirinaki Te Pua-a-Tāne Conservation Park in the Bay of Plenty Region. An unconfirmed sighting of the species in a third area occurred at Whangamōmona in 2022.

At Bream Head, the species lives in coastal broad-leaved forest, scrubland, and on rock outcrops, while the Whirinaki population lives in Podocarpus, tawa and tawhai forests.

== Behaviour ==
Oligosoma kakerakau is diurnal, and is known to feed on small invertebrates.

== Conservation status ==
As of 2021 the Department of Conservation (DOC) classified Oligosoma kakerakau as Nationally Critical under the New Zealand Threat Classification System.
