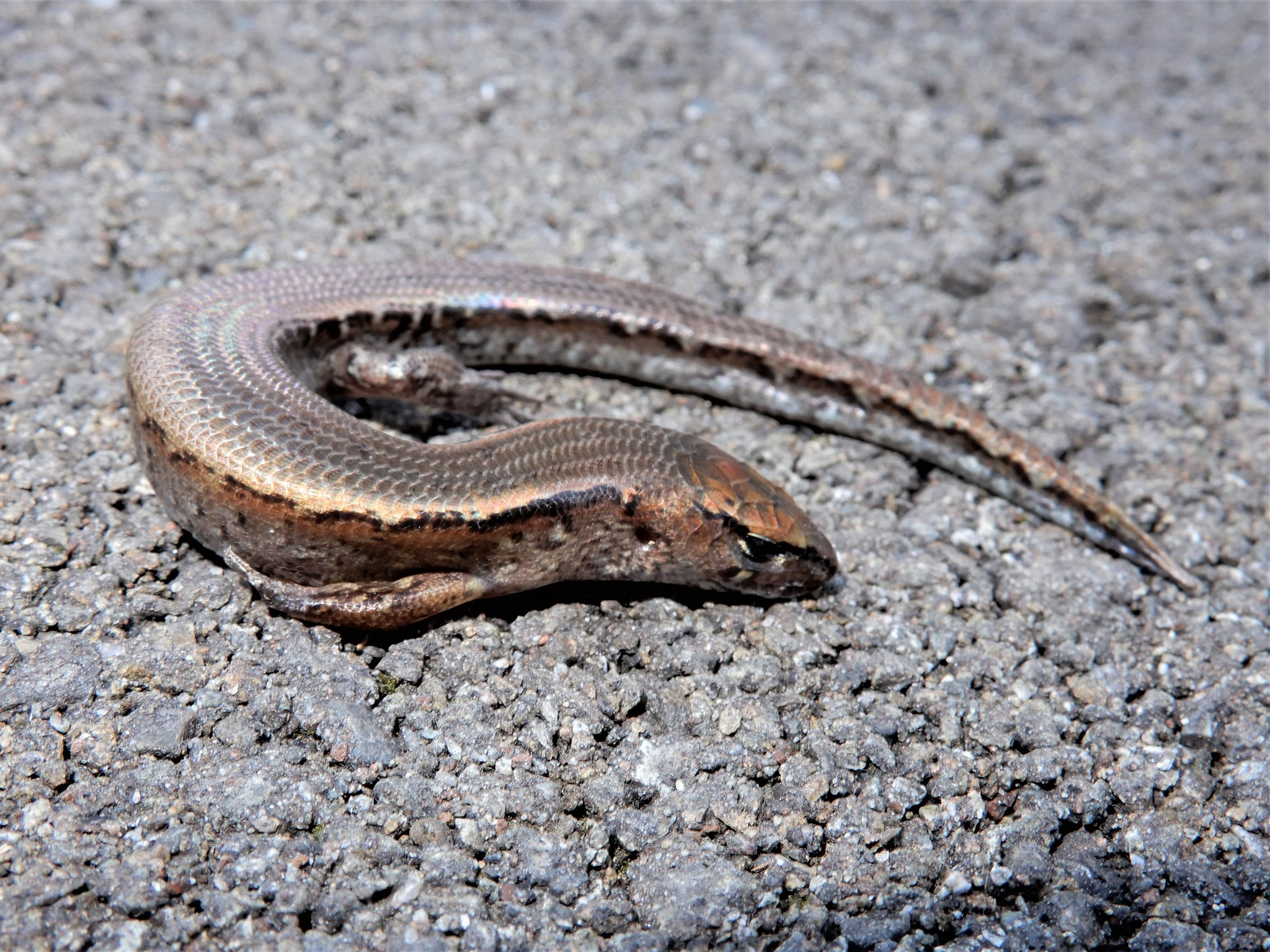
- Near Palmerston North, New Zealand

Conservation status
- Least Concern (IUCN 3.1)

Scientific classification
- Kingdom: Animalia
- Phylum: Chordata
- Order: Squamata
- Family: Scincidae
- Genus: Oligosoma
- Species: O. ornatum

Binomial name
- Oligosoma ornatum (Gray, 1843)
- Distribution of the ornate skink in the North Island Known native range

Synonyms
- Cyclodina pseudornata (Robb 1986); Cyclodina ornata (Gray, 1843); Tiliqua ornata Gray, 1843

= Ornate skink =

Species of lizard

The ornate skink (Oligosoma ornatum) is a rare species of skink endemic to New Zealand. Once widespread across the North Island, habitat destruction and predation by introduced species has now reduced their range to scattered localities throughout the North Island and offshore islands.

== Taxonomy ==
The species was first described as Tiliqua ornata by John Edward Gray in 1843. It was placed in the genus Cyclodina by Graham S. Hardy in 1977, and was moved to its modern genus Oligosoma in 2009 based on phylogenetic analysis. Both the species epithet ornatum and the species' common name refer to the ornate patterns on the skink species.

== Description ==
Ornate skinks have a snout–vent length of up to 84 mm (3.3 in), and can weigh as much as 11.5 g (0.41 oz). The species has a short snout, a teardrop marking beneath its eyes, and black markings along the neck and shoulders. Individuals of the species vary in terms of the shade of brown on their bodies and patterning. The population found on Manawatāwhi / Three Kings Islands is morphologically distinct, having longer snouts, more slender bodies, and less contrasting underside surfaces. Specimens from the Northland Region can also have more distinct patterns and markings.

Ornate skinks can be identified by the white or yellowish "teardrop" edged with black, below each eye, and as the species is relatively larger compared to other visually similar species, such as the copper skink.

== Behaviour ==
The species prefers to live in damp or humid environments, typically forests and grasslands, and areas with significant amounts of damp leaf litter. It is primarily active during twilight. Ornate skinks typically feed on small invertebrates. Ornate skinks mate in spring, giving birth to between four and six individuals over summer, typically between January and February.

Ornate skinks co-exist widely with copper skinks, and at selected localities with robust skinks, Mokohinau skinks, McGregor's skinks, Poor Knights skinks and on Great Barrier and Little Barrier Islands, marbled skinks. Ornate skinks are not currently known to co-exist with Whitaker's skinks.

== Distribution ==
The species is widespread across the North Island of New Zealand, except for the Hawkes Bay area. Additionally, the species can be found on many offshore islands near the North Island, including Manawatāwhi / Three Kings Islands, Great Barrier Island, and Little Barrier Island. This species was once widespread through much of the North Island and on many offshore islands in the Hauraki Gulf and north of the Coromandel Peninsula. Habitat destruction and predation by introduced species has now reduced their range to scattered localities throughout the North Island as far south as Wellington, as well as on the Three Kings Islands, Great Barrier Island, and a few other offshore islands.

== Conservation status ==
In 2012 the Department of Conservation classified the ornate skink as At Risk under the New Zealand Threat Classification System. It was judged as meeting the criteria for At Risk threat status as a result of it having a low to high ongoing or predicted decline. This skink is also regarded as being Conservation Dependant.
