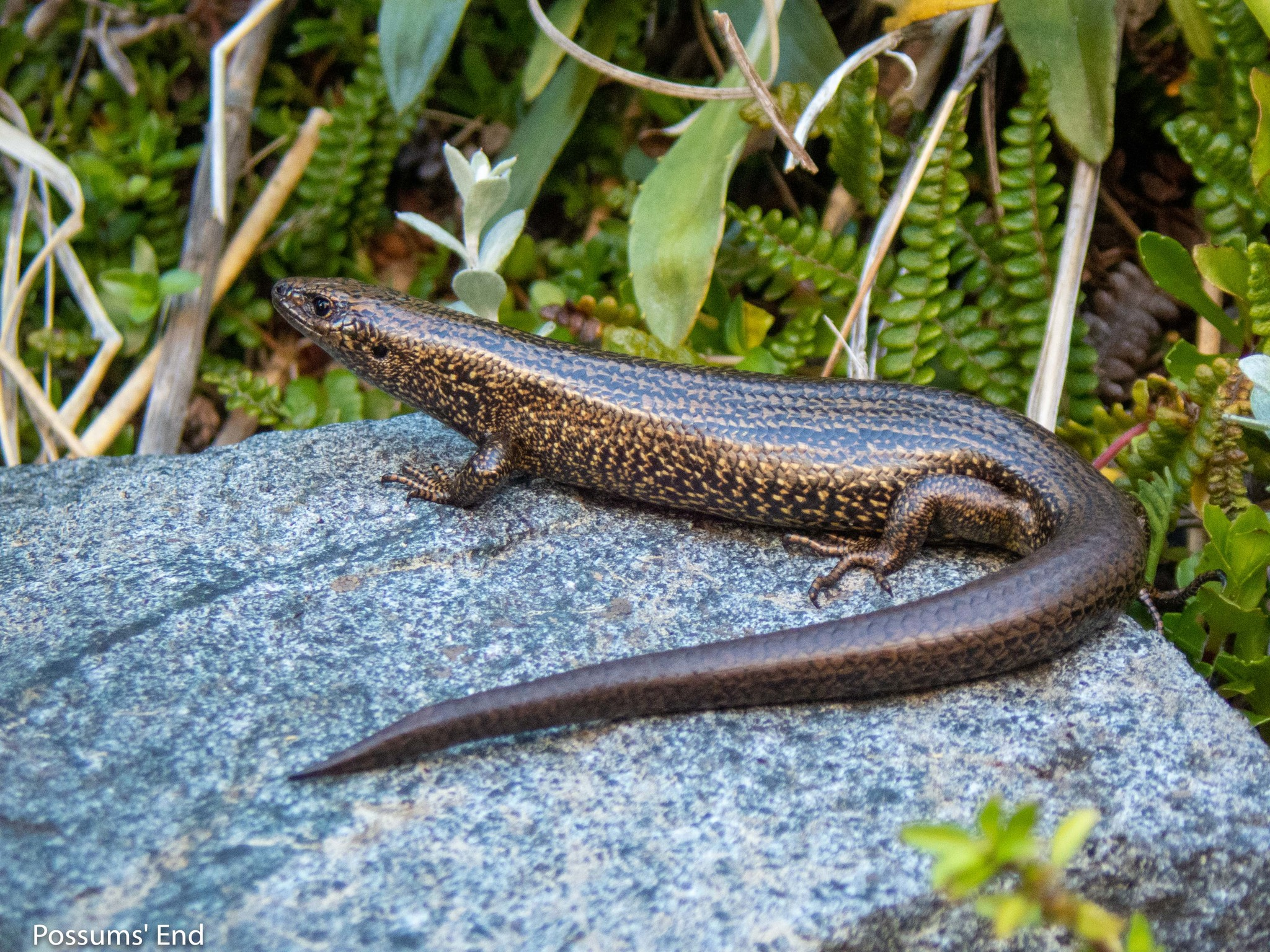

Conservation status
- Critically Endangered (IUCN 3.1)

Scientific classification
- Kingdom: Animalia
- Phylum: Chordata
- Class: Reptilia
- Order: Squamata
- Family: Scincidae
- Genus: Oligosoma
- Species: O. awakopaka

Binomial name
- Oligosoma awakopaka Jewell, 2017
- Distribution of Oligosoma awakopaka on a map of the South Island Known native range

= Oligosoma awakopaka =

Species of lizard

Oligosoma awakopaka, the Awakopaka skink, is a rare species of skink (alpine lizard) found in New Zealand. It can reach a snout-vent-length (SVL) of up to 77 mm and has a glossy, vibrant brown-yellow dorsal surface flecked with black, and typically sports a faint pale dorsolateral stripe edged with black. The ventral surface is vivid yellow and flecked with black as well (van Winkel et al., 2018; Jewell, 2008).

The species is highly cryptic and has only been observed basking on two or three occasions. It is presumed to be diurnal and terrestrial, and is only known to inhabit the alpine zone, where it lives among grasses, herbfield, and fellfield.

The Awakōpaka skink is thought to be extremely rare and is currently only known from an area less than two hectares in size, although it is possible that the species can be found elsewhere in Fiordland National Park, waiting to be discovered (pers. comm. Carey Knox). This species endures an incredibly harsh environment and is continuously subjected to avalanches and rockfalls. Its life expectancy is unknown
