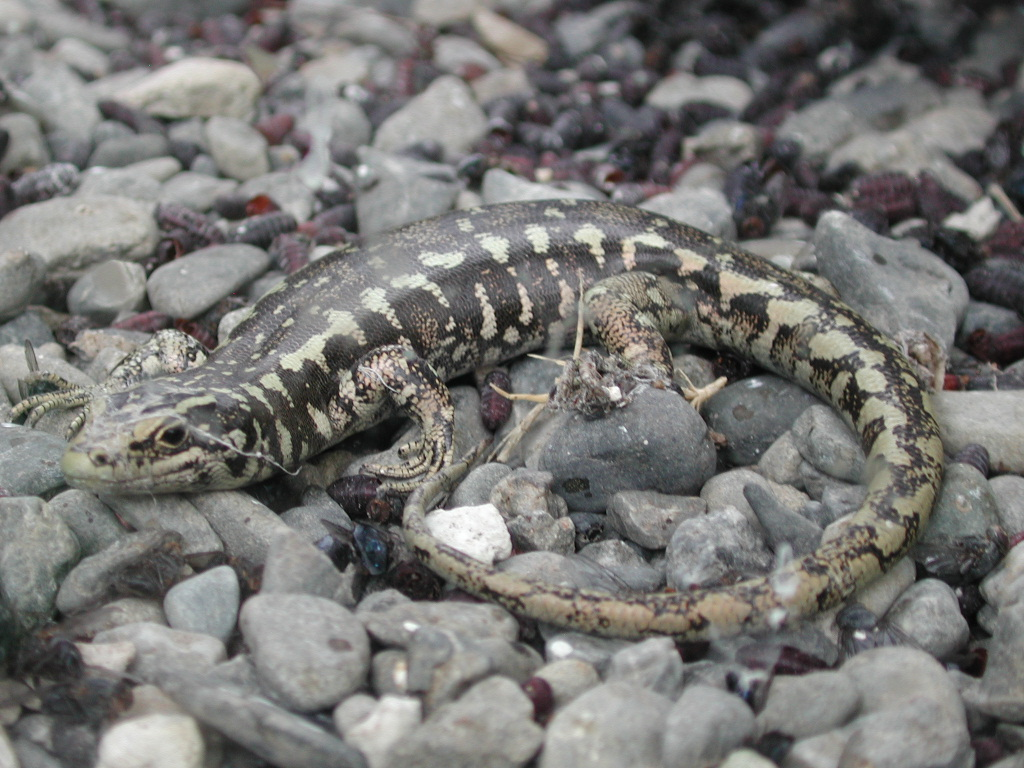
- Otago skink, Oligosoma otagense

Scientific classification
- Kingdom: Animalia
- Phylum: Chordata
- Class: Reptilia
- Order: Squamata
- Family: Scincidae
- Subfamily: Eugongylinae
- Genus: Oligosoma; Girard, 1857

Species
- Over 50, see text.

= Oligosoma =

Genus of lizards

Oligosoma is a genus of small to medium-sized skinks (family Scincidae) found only in New Zealand, Norfolk Island and Lord Howe Island. Oligosoma had previously been found to belong to the Eugongylus group of genera in the subfamily Lygosominae; the Australian genus Bassiana appears to be fairly closely related.

== Species ==
The genus Oligosoma contains the following 57 species. The type species for Oligosoma is Oligosoma zelandicum, by original designation.

- Oligosoma acrinasum (Hardy, 1977) – Fiordland skink
- Oligosoma aeneum (Girard, 1858) – copper skink
- Oligosoma alani (Robb, 1970) – Alan's skink, robust skink
- Oligosoma albornense Melzer, Hitchmough, Bell, D. Chapple & Patterson, 2019 – Alborn skink
- Oligosoma aureocola Knox, Patterson & D. Chapple, 2023 – Mataura skink
- Oligosoma auroraense Melzer, Hitchmough, Bell, D. Chapple & Patterson, 2019 – Hawke's Bay skink, eastern speckled skink
- Oligosoma awakopaka Jewell, 2017 – Awakopaka skink
- Oligosoma burganae D. Chapple et al., 2011 – Burgan skink
- Oligosoma carinacauda Bell & Patterson, 2024 – Okuru skink
- Oligosoma chloronoton (Hardy, 1977) – green skink
- Oligosoma elium Melzer, Bell & Patterson, 2017 – Marlborough spotted skink
- Oligosoma eludens Knox, Chapple & Bell, 2024 – rockhopper skink
- Oligosoma fallai (McCann, 1955) – Falla's skink, Three Kings skink
- Oligosoma grande (Gray, 1845) – grand skink
- Oligosoma hardyi (D. Chapple, Patterson, Bell & Daugherty, 2008) – Hardy's skink
- Oligosoma homalonotum (Boulenger, 1906) – chevron skink
- Oligosoma hoparatea Whitaker, D. Chapple, Hitchmough, Lettink & Patterson, 2018 – Pukuma skink, white-bellied skink
- Oligosoma inconspicuum (Patterson & Daugherty, 1990) – cryptic skink
- Oligosoma infrapunctatum (Boulenger, 1887) – cobble skink, speckled skink
- Oligosoma judgei Patterson & Bell, 2009 – barrier skink
- Oligosoma kahurangi Patterson & Hitchmough, 2021
- Oligosoma kakerakau Barr, D. Chapple, Hitchmough, Patterson & Ngatiwai Trust Board, 2021
- Oligosoma kokowai Melzer, Bell & Patterson, 2017 – northern spotted skink
- Oligosoma levidensum (D. Chapple, Patterson, Bell & Daugherty, 2008) – slight skink
- Oligosoma lichenigerum (O’Shaughnessy, 1874) – Lord Howe and Norfolk Islands skink
- Oligosoma lineoocellatum (A.H.A. Duméril, 1851) – Canterbury spotted skink
- Oligosoma longipes Patterson, 1997 – long-toed skink
- Oligosoma maccanni (Hardy, 1977) – McCann's skink
- Oligosoma macgregori (Robb, 1975) – MacGregor's skink
- Oligosoma microlepis (Patterson & Daugherty, 1990) – small-scaled skink
- Oligosoma moco (A.M.C. Duméril & Bibron, 1839) – Moko skink
- Oligosoma newmani (Wells & Wellington, 1985) – Newman's speckled skink
- Oligosoma nigriplantare (W. Peters, 1874) – Chatham Islands skink
- Oligosoma northlandi (Worthy, 1991) – Northland skink (extinct)
- Oligosoma notosaurus (Patterson & Daugherty, 1990) – southern skink
- Oligosoma oliveri (McCann, 1955) – marbled skink, Oliver's New Zealand skink
- Oligosoma ornatum (Gray, 1843) – Gray's ornate skink
- Oligosoma otagense (McCann, 1955) – Otago skink
- Oligosoma pachysomaticum (Robb, 1975) – Coromandel skink
- Oligosoma pikitanga Bell & Patterson, 2008 – Sinbad skink
- Oligosoma polychroma Patterson & Daugherty, 1990 – common New Zealand skink, southern grass skink
- Oligosoma prasinum Melzer, Bell & Patterson, 2017 – Mackenzie skink
- Oligosoma repens D. Chapple, Bell, S. Chapple, Miller, Daugherty & Patterson, 2011 – Eyres skink
- Oligosoma robinsoni (Wells & Wellington, 1985) – crenulate skink, Hokitika skink, cobble skink
- Oligosoma roimata Patterson, Hitchmough & D. Chapple, 2013 – Aorangi skink
- Oligosoma salmo Melzer, Hitchmough, Bell, D. Chapple & Patterson, 2019 – Chesterfield skink
- Oligosoma smithi (Gray, 1845) – shore skink
- Oligosoma stenotis (Patterson & Daugherty, 1994) – small-eared skink
- Oligosoma striatum (Buller, 1871) – striped skink
- Oligosoma suteri (Boulenger, 1906) – egg-laying skink, Suter's skink
- Oligosoma taumakae D. Chapple & Patterson, 2007 – Open Bay Islands skink, Taumaka skink
- Oligosoma tekakahu D. Chapple, Bell, S. Chapple, Miller, Daugherty & Patterson, 2011 – Te Kakahu skink
- Oligosoma toka D. Chapple, Bell, S. Chapple, Miller, Daugherty & Patterson, 2011 – Nevis skink
- Oligosoma townsi (D. Chapple, Patterson, Gleeson, Daugherty & Ritchie, 2008) – Mokohinau skink
- Oligosoma waimatense (McCann, 1955) – scree skink
- Oligosoma whitakeri (Hardy, 1977) – Whitaker's New Zealand skink
- Oligosoma zelandicum (Gray, 1843) – brown skink

A binomial authority in parentheses indicates that the species was originally described in a genus other than Oligosoma.

Numerous undescribed species also exist within the genus, including the cobble skink and tātahi skink.

=== Merger of Oligosoma and Cyclodina ===
A molecular phylogenetic analysis has merged the genus Cyclodina with Oligosoma, rendering Cyclodina an obsolete taxon.
