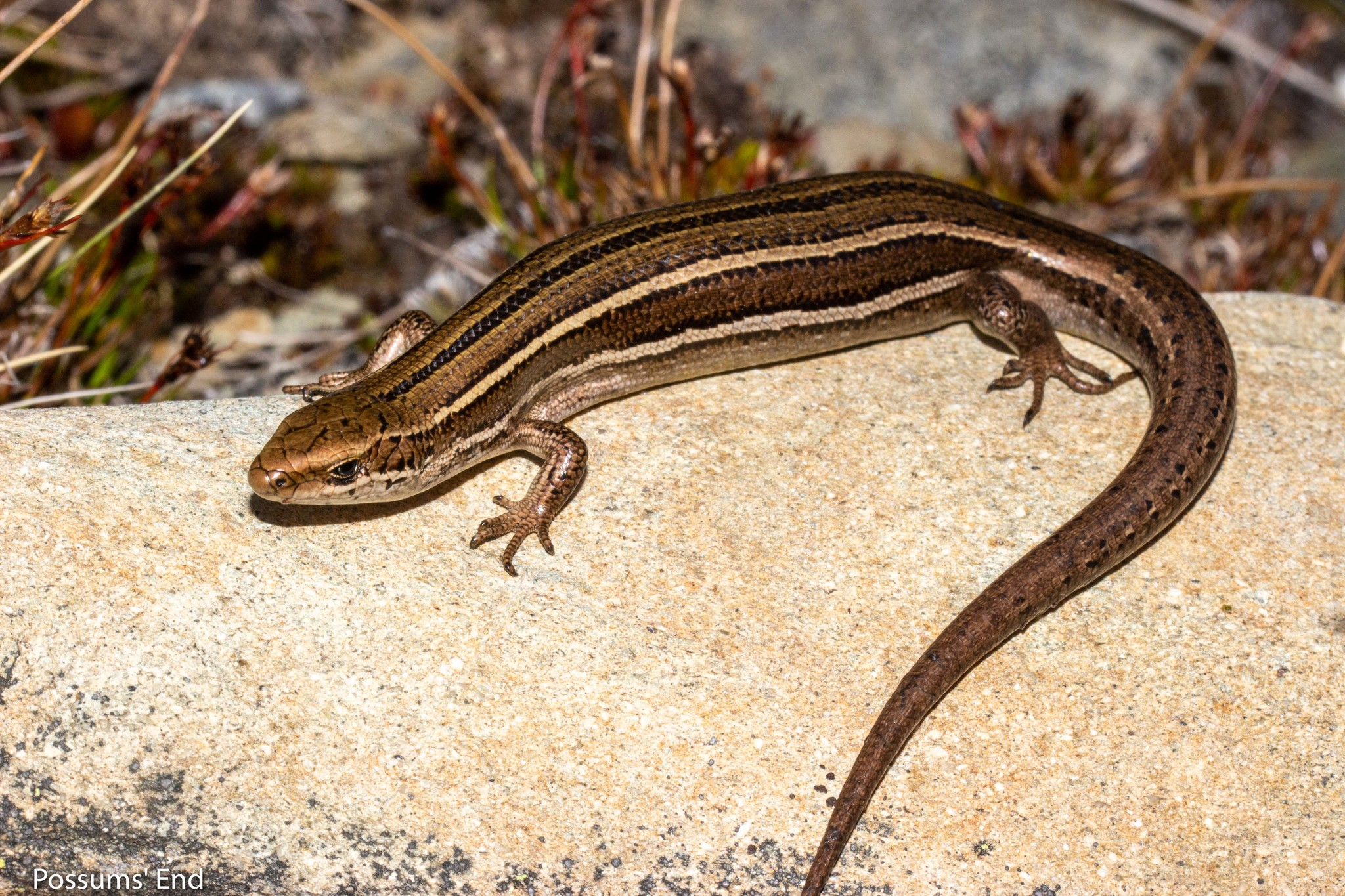

Conservation status
- Endangered (IUCN 3.1)

Scientific classification
- Kingdom: Animalia
- Phylum: Chordata
- Class: Reptilia
- Order: Squamata
- Family: Scincidae
- Genus: Oligosoma
- Species: O. toka

Binomial name
- Oligosoma toka Chapple, Bell, Chapple, Miller, Patterson & Daugherty, 2011
- Distribution of Oligosoma toka on a map of the South Island Known native range

= Nevis skink =

Species of lizard

The Nevis skink (Oligosoma toka) is a nationally vulnerable species of skink native to New Zealand. It is named in honour of the location of its habitat, the Nevis valley.

== Conservation status ==
As of 2012 the Department of Conservation (DOC) classified the Nevis skink as Nationally Vulnerable under the New Zealand Threat Classification System.

== Similar species ==
The Nevis skink can be mistaken for the more common northern grass skink (Oligosoma polychroma), though tends to have a heavier body build and a less-streamlined head.
