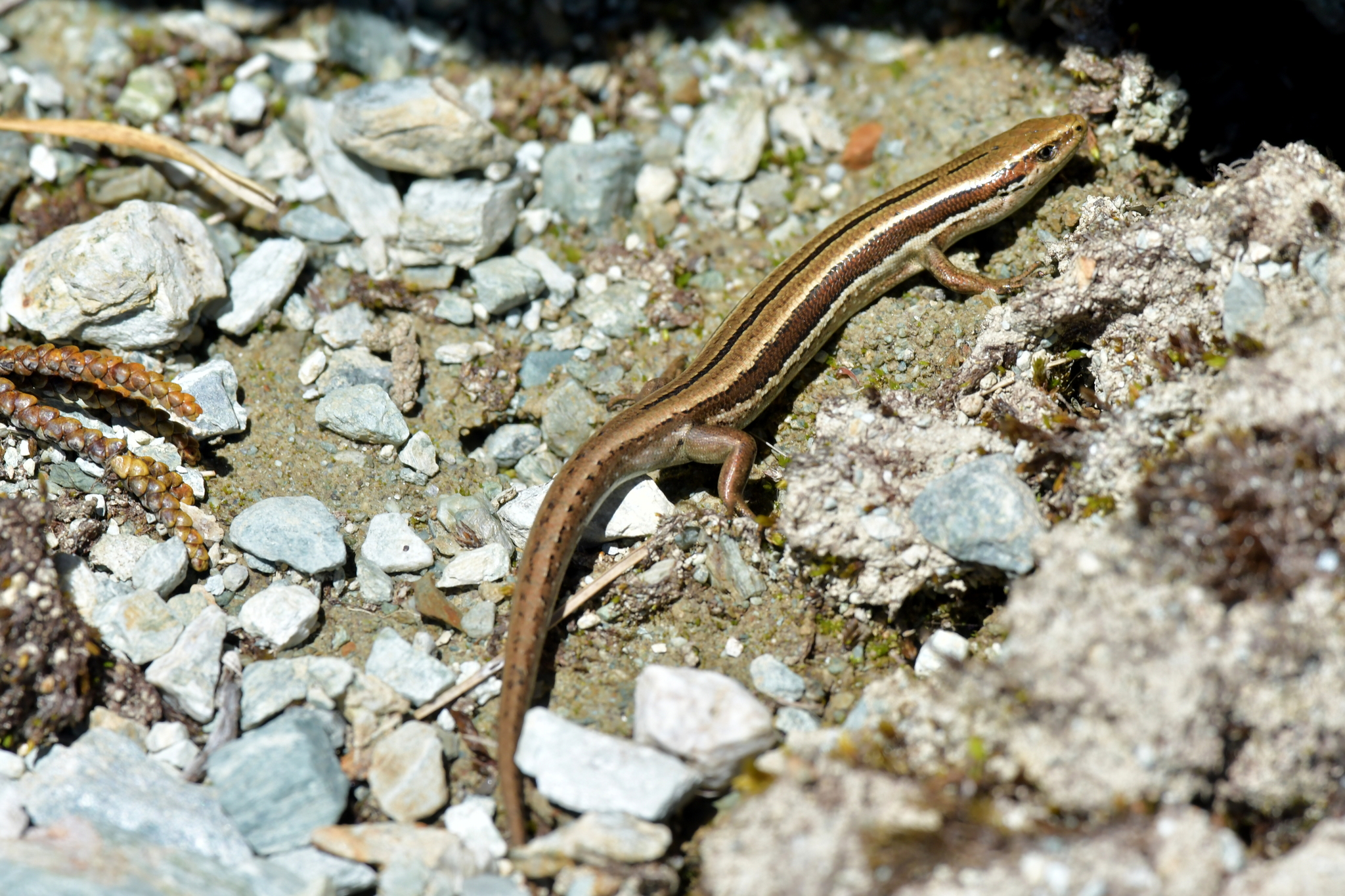

Conservation status
- Vulnerable (IUCN 3.1)

Scientific classification
- Kingdom: Animalia
- Phylum: Chordata
- Class: Reptilia
- Order: Squamata
- Family: Scincidae
- Genus: Oligosoma
- Species: O. repens

Binomial name
- Oligosoma repens Chapple, Bell, Chapple, Miller, Patterson & Daugherty, 2011
- Distribution of Eyres skink on a map of the South Island Known native range

= Eyres skink =

Species of lizard

The Eyres skink (Oligosoma repens) is a nationally vulnerable species of skink native to New Zealand. It is named in honour of the location of its habitat, the Eyre Mountains.

== Conservation status ==
As of 2012 the Department of Conservation (DOC) classified the Eyres skink as Nationally Vulnerable under the New Zealand Threat Classification System.
