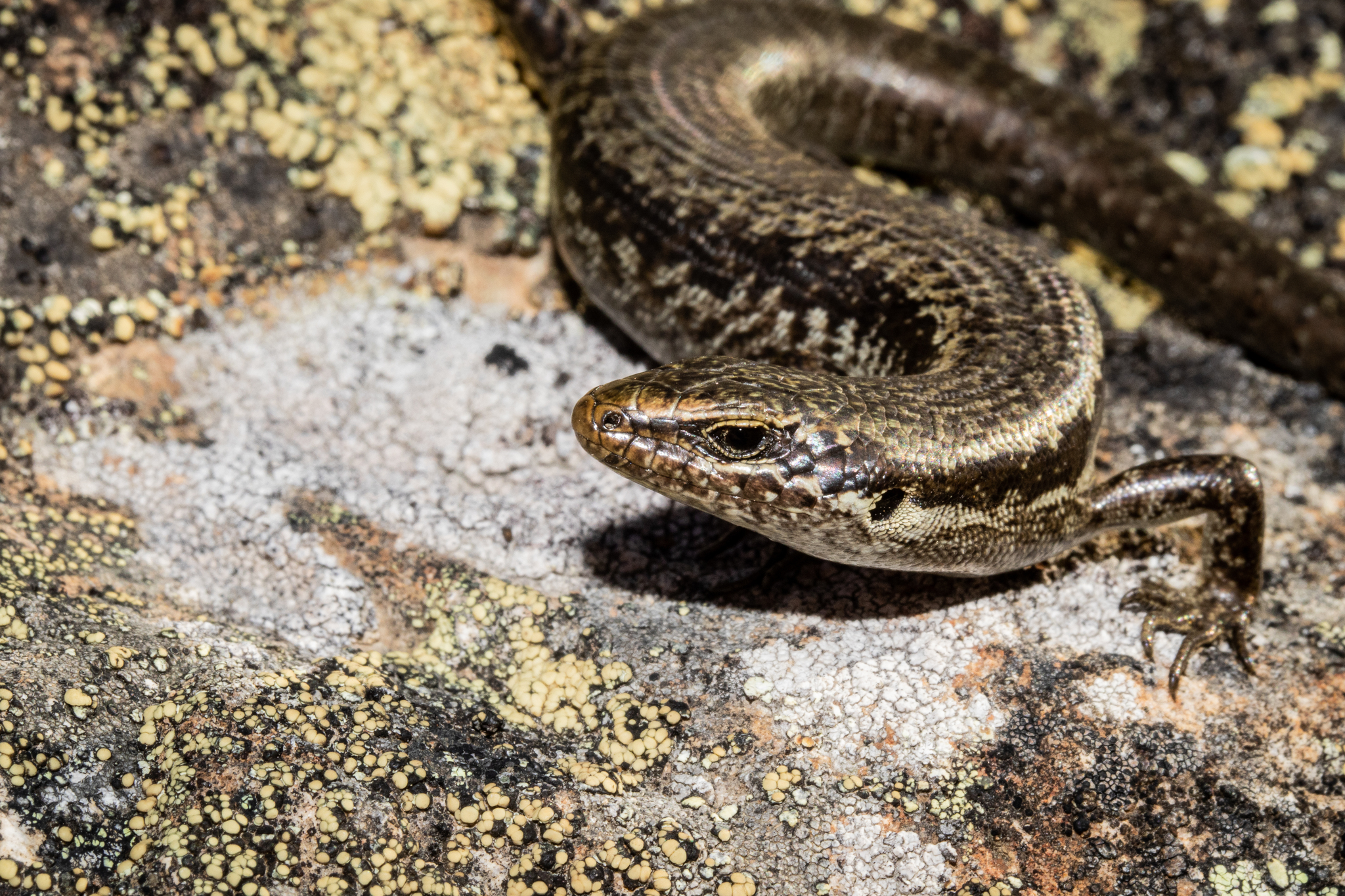
- Oligosoma longipes seen in the Hurunui District, New Zealand

Conservation status
- Endangered (IUCN 3.1)

Scientific classification
- Kingdom: Animalia
- Phylum: Chordata
- Class: Reptilia
- Order: Squamata
- Family: Scincidae
- Genus: Oligosoma
- Species: O. longipes

Binomial name
- Oligosoma longipes Patterson, 1997
- Distribution of the long-toed skink on a map of the South Island Known native range

= Long-toed skink =

Species of lizard

The long-toed skink (Oligosoma longipes) is a species of skink of the family Scincidae, endemic to New Zealand. It was first described by Geoff Patterson in 1997. It is only known from a few sites in the South Island of New Zealand and little is known of its habits. It seems to prefer dry, rocky habitats, usually eroding stream terraces or scree slopes. It is diurnal and heliothermic. Maximum snout-vent length is about 70 mm.

== Conservation status ==
As of 2012 the Department of Conservation (DOC) classified the long-toed skink as Nationally Vulnerable under the New Zealand Threat Classification System.
