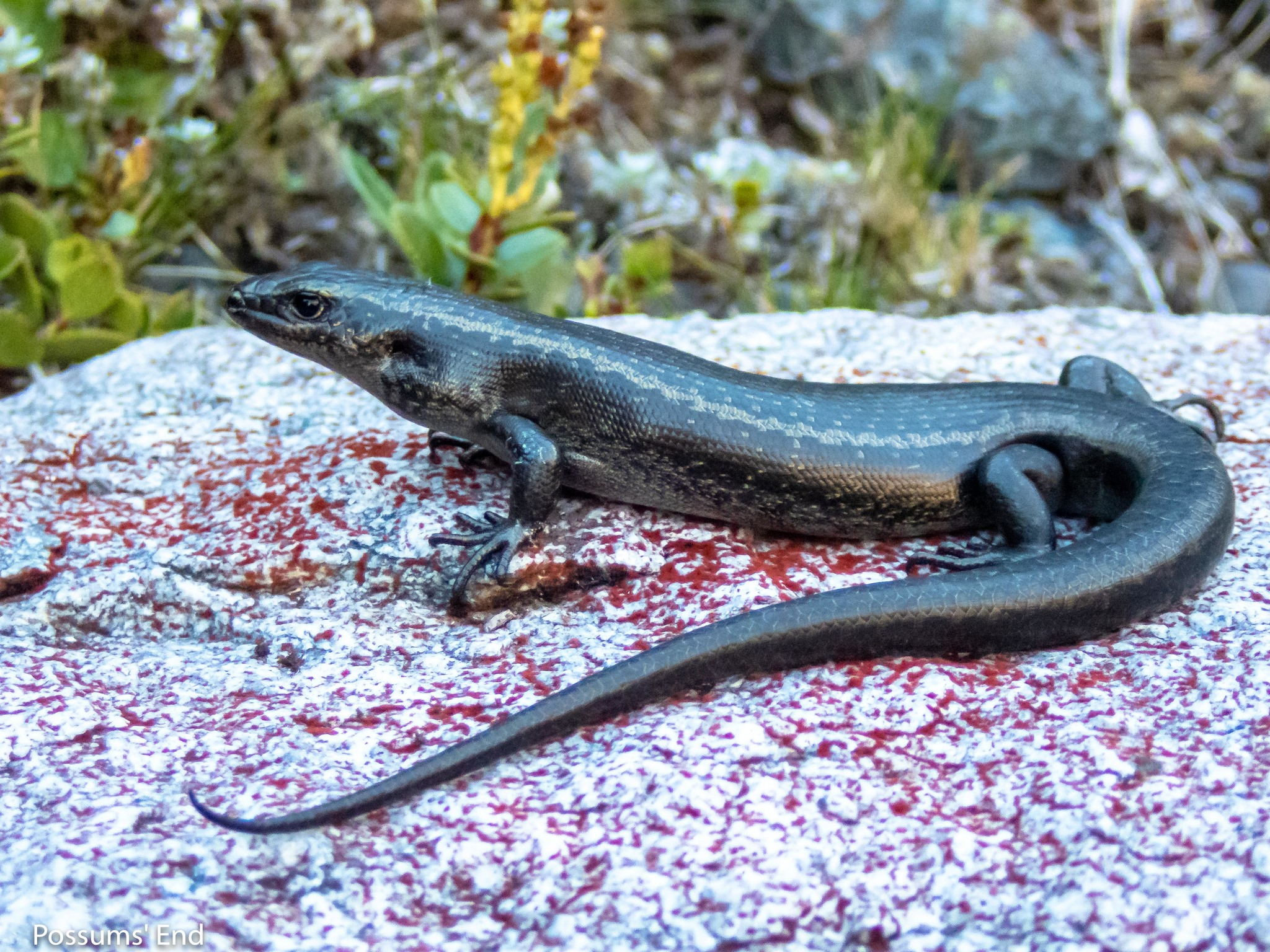

Conservation status
- Critically Endangered (IUCN 3.1)

Scientific classification
- Kingdom: Animalia
- Phylum: Chordata
- Class: Reptilia
- Order: Squamata
- Family: Scincidae
- Genus: Oligosoma
- Species: O. judgei

Binomial name
- Oligosoma judgei Patterson & Bell, 2009
- Distribution of the barrier skink on a map of the South Island Known native range

= Barrier skink =

Species of lizard

The Barrier skink (Oligosoma judgei) is a species of medium-sized skink, a lizard in the subfamily Eugongylinae of the family Scincidae. The species is endemic to New Zealand, where it lives in the alpine habitat of the Darran and Takitimu Mountains of Fiordland. It is one of only two species of New Zealand skinks that live exclusively in the alpine zone, the other being the "Sinbad skink", Oligosoma pikitanga, a closely related species of similar appearance which is found in the same part of the South Island. The Barrier skink was first collected in the 1960s but was overlooked until rediscovery by a pair of mountain climbers in 2005; the species was scientifically described in 2009.

== Etymology ==
The specific name, judgei, is in honor of Bronwyn Judge and Murray Judge, two New Zealand rock climbers who discovered this skink on Barrier Knob.

== Habitat ==
The preferred natural habitat of O. judgei is rocky areas of grassland, at altitudes of 1,100–1,650 m (3,610–5,410 ft).

== Description ==
The holotype of O. judgei, an adult male, has a snout-to-vent length (SVL) of 8 cm (3.1 in), but females may grow to 9 cm (3.5 in) SVL.

== Behavior ==
Oligosoma judgei is terrestrial, saxicolous, diurnal, and heliothermic.

== Reproduction ==
Oligosoma judgei is viviparous.

== Conservation status ==
The conservation status of this species, O. judgei, was thought to be secure, primarily because invasive mammalian predator populations could not become established in the harsh climate of the high alpine zone where they lived and also, because vast areas of undisturbed habitat remain intact. However, in 2012 the Department of Conservation reclassified the Barrier Skink as Nationally Endangered under the New Zealand Threat Classification System.
