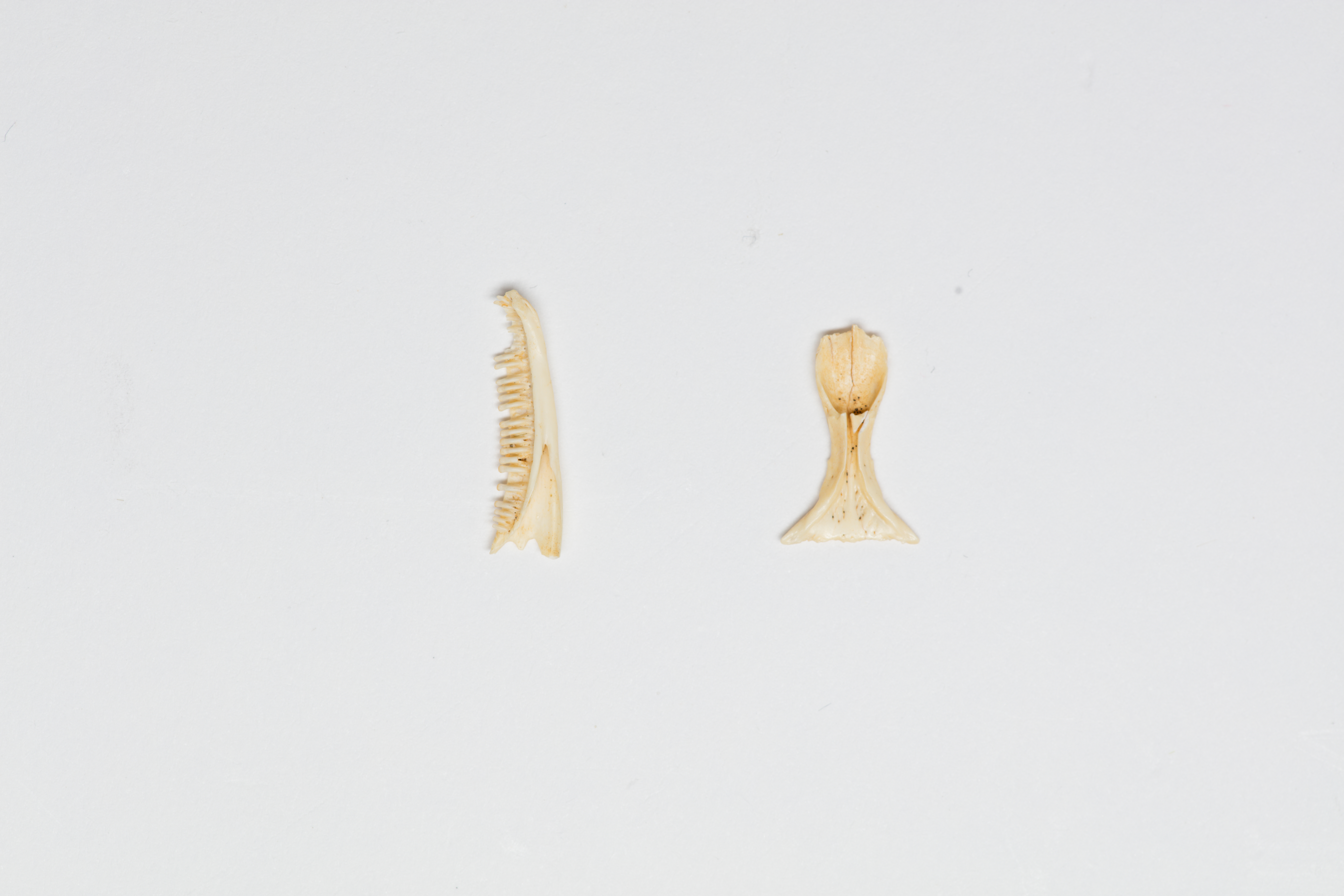
- Bone fragments collected from the Aupouri Peninsula

Conservation status
- Extinct (NZ TCS)

Scientific classification
- Kingdom: Animalia
- Phylum: Chordata
- Class: Reptilia
- Order: Squamata
- Family: Scincidae
- Genus: Oligosoma
- Species: †O. northlandi

Binomial name
- †Oligosoma northlandi (Worthy, 1991)

Synonyms
- Cyclodina northlandi

= Northland skink =

Extinct species of lizard

The Northland skink (Oligosoma northlandi) is an extinct species of skink which was endemic to the Northland Region of North Island, New Zealand. It is known from late Holocene subfossil remains.
