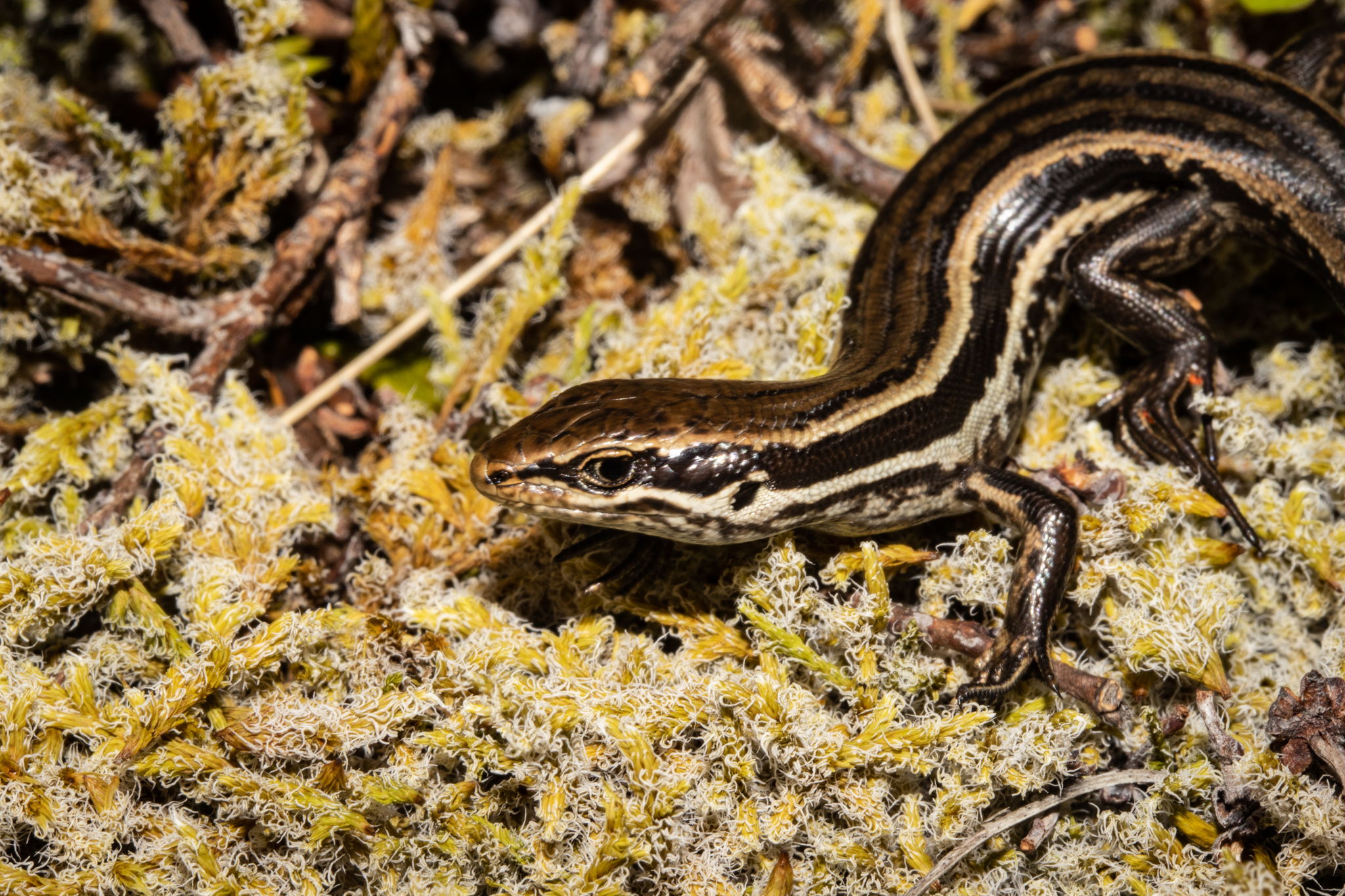
- Oligosoma kahurangi seen in northwestern Tasman District, New Zealand

Scientific classification
- Kingdom: Animalia
- Phylum: Chordata
- Class: Reptilia
- Order: Squamata
- Family: Scincidae
- Genus: Oligosoma
- Species: O. kahurangi

Binomial name
- Oligosoma kahurangi Patterson & Hitchmough, 2021
- Distribution of Oligosoma kahurangi on a map of the South Island Known native range

= Oligosoma kahurangi =

Species of lizard

Oligosoma kahurangi is a species of skink found in New Zealand.
