= Oligosoma auroraense =

Scientific classification
- Domain: Eukaryota
- Kingdom: Animalia
- Phylum: Chordata
- Class: Reptilia
- Order: Squamata
- Family: Scincidae
- Genus: Oligosoma
- Species: O. auroraense

Binomial name
- Oligosoma auroraense Melzer, Hitchmough, Bell, Chapple, & Patterson, 2019
- Distribution of Oligosoma auroraense on a map of the North Island Known native range

Species of lizard

The Hawke's Bay skink or eastern speckled skink (Oligosoma auroraense) is a species of skink found in New Zealand.
