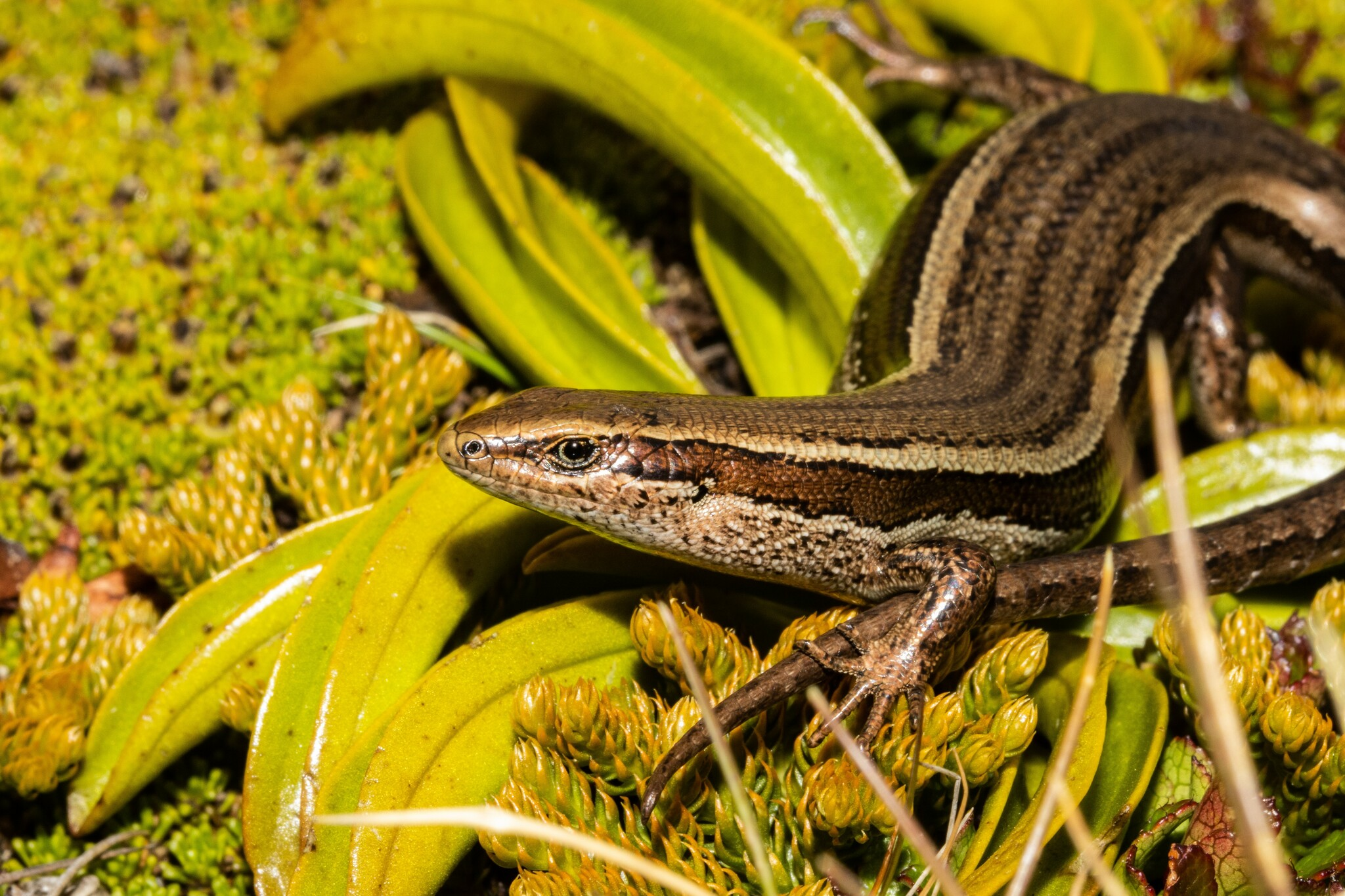

Scientific classification
- Kingdom: Animalia
- Phylum: Chordata
- Class: Reptilia
- Order: Squamata
- Family: Scincidae
- Genus: Oligosoma
- Species: O. aureocola

Binomial name
- Oligosoma aureocola Knox, Patterson & D. Chapple, 2023
- Distribution of Oligosoma aureocola on a map of the South Island Known native range

= Oligosoma aureocola =

Species of lizard

Oligosoma aureocola, the Mataura skink, is a species of skink found in New Zealand.
