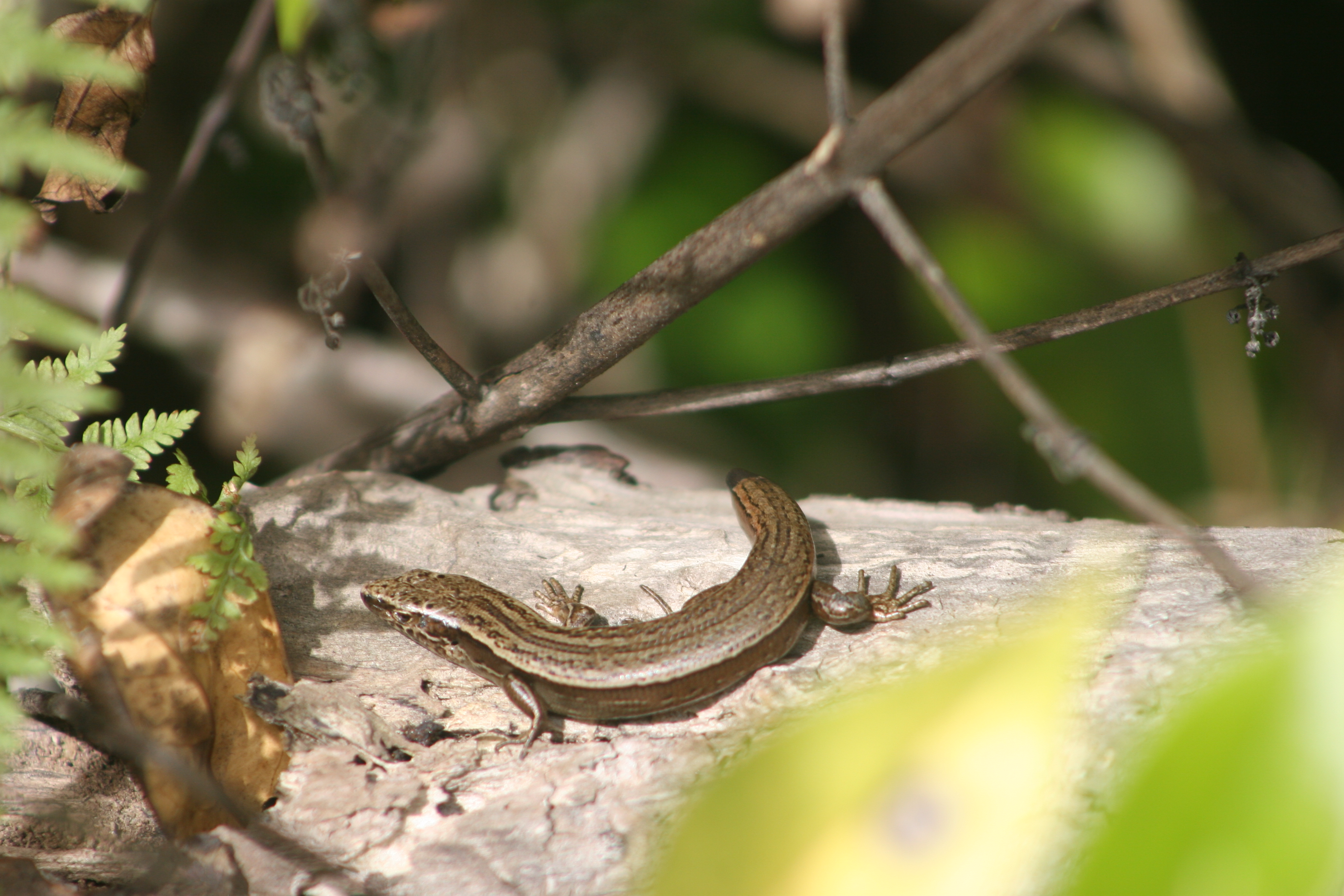

Conservation status
- Least Concern (IUCN 3.1)

Scientific classification
- Kingdom: Animalia
- Phylum: Chordata
- Class: Reptilia
- Order: Squamata
- Family: Scincidae
- Genus: Oligosoma
- Species: O. zelandicum

Binomial name
- Oligosoma zelandicum (Gray, 1843)
- Distribution of the brown skink in New Zealand Known native range

Synonyms
- Leiolopisma zelandica; Leiolopisma zelandicum; Lygosoma zelandica; Mocoa zelandica; Tiliqua zelandica

= Brown skink =

Species of lizard

The brown skink (Oligosoma zelandicum) is a species of skink that is native to New Zealand. It is the type species of the genus Oligosoma Girard, 1857, by original designation.

== Distribution ==
The brown skink is relatively numerous and is found from Taranaki to Wellington in the North Island and in the Marlborough Sounds, Nelson and Westland in the South Island.

== Conservation status ==
The brown skink is listed as Least Concern by the IUCN Red List as of 2010. In 2012 the Department of Conservation classified the brown skink as At Risk Declining under the New Zealand Threat Classification System.
