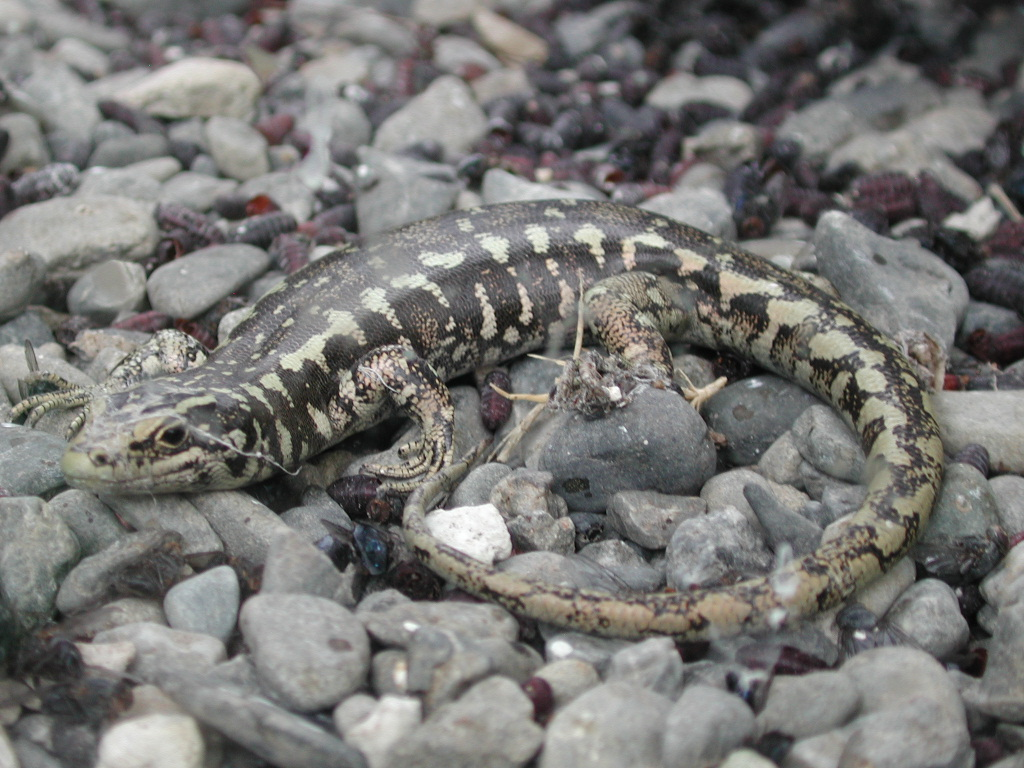

Conservation status
- Endangered (IUCN 3.1)

Scientific classification
- Kingdom: Animalia
- Phylum: Chordata
- Class: Reptilia
- Order: Squamata
- Family: Scincidae
- Genus: Oligosoma
- Species: O. otagense

Binomial name
- Oligosoma otagense McCann, 1955
- Distribution of Oligosoma otagense on a map of the South Island Known native range

Synonyms
- Girardiscincus otagense (McCann, 1955); Leiolopisma grande ssp. otagense McCann, 1955

= Otago skink =

Species of lizard

The Otago skink (Oligosoma otagense) is a rare, endangered species of large skink in the family Scincidae, found in the rocky canyons and grassy patches of Central Otago, New Zealand.

== Physical characteristics ==
Otago skinks are large compared to other New Zealand skinks, growing up to 12 inches (30 cm). They are marked with distinctive black, yellow, and green spots, which provides excellent camouflage in their rocky habitat of lichen-covered rocks and schist outcrops. Juveniles have more of a yellow base with dark blotches and shorter limbs. Like most skinks, Otago skinks are omnivores and feed on a wide variety of insects, fleshy fruits, flower petals, or even other small reptiles. They are long-lived, reaching around 16 years in the wild and up to 40 years in captivity, and are slow to mature, reaching sexual maturity at 3–4 years. Unlike many reptiles, this species is viviparous, with embryos developing in the mother's body, who then gives birth to live young. Between one and three young are born between January and March.

== Distribution and habitat ==
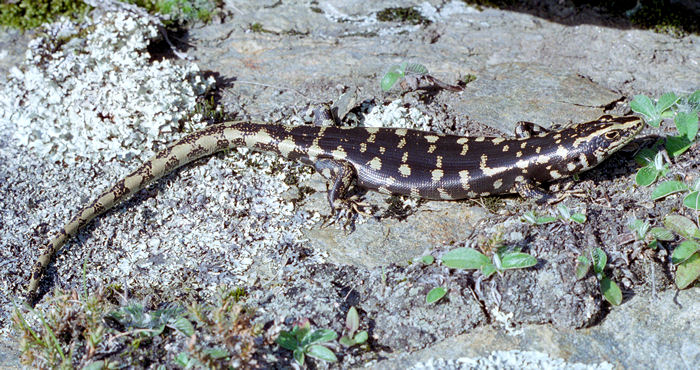
A basking individual

Otago skinks are only found in very specific locations in Otago. Most are found in eastern Otago, between Macreas Flat and Sutton, usually up to 1,000 meters in elevation. There is also a smaller population in western Otago between Lake Hāwea and Lindis Pass. The combined range is nearly 860 mi^{2}. Although the two populations are morphologically similar, there has been speculation as to whether they have undergone genetic divergence. A phylogeographic analysis found a separation in lineages but that gene flow was still occurring in neighboring locations, and suggested that the two regions be assessed and treated separately.

Although individuals occasionally are found in the surrounding tussocks, the skinks are typically limited to the large schist rock outcroppings found in that region. They can often be seen sunning themselves on these rocks to regulate body temperature and seek refuge in the deep crevices when alarmed, at night and on cold days.

An estimate from 2001 found that the range of the Otago skink had decreased by roughly 90% over the last 100 years, presumably driven by land use changes, particularly the intensification of farming, and the introduction of mammalian predators.

== Conservation ==
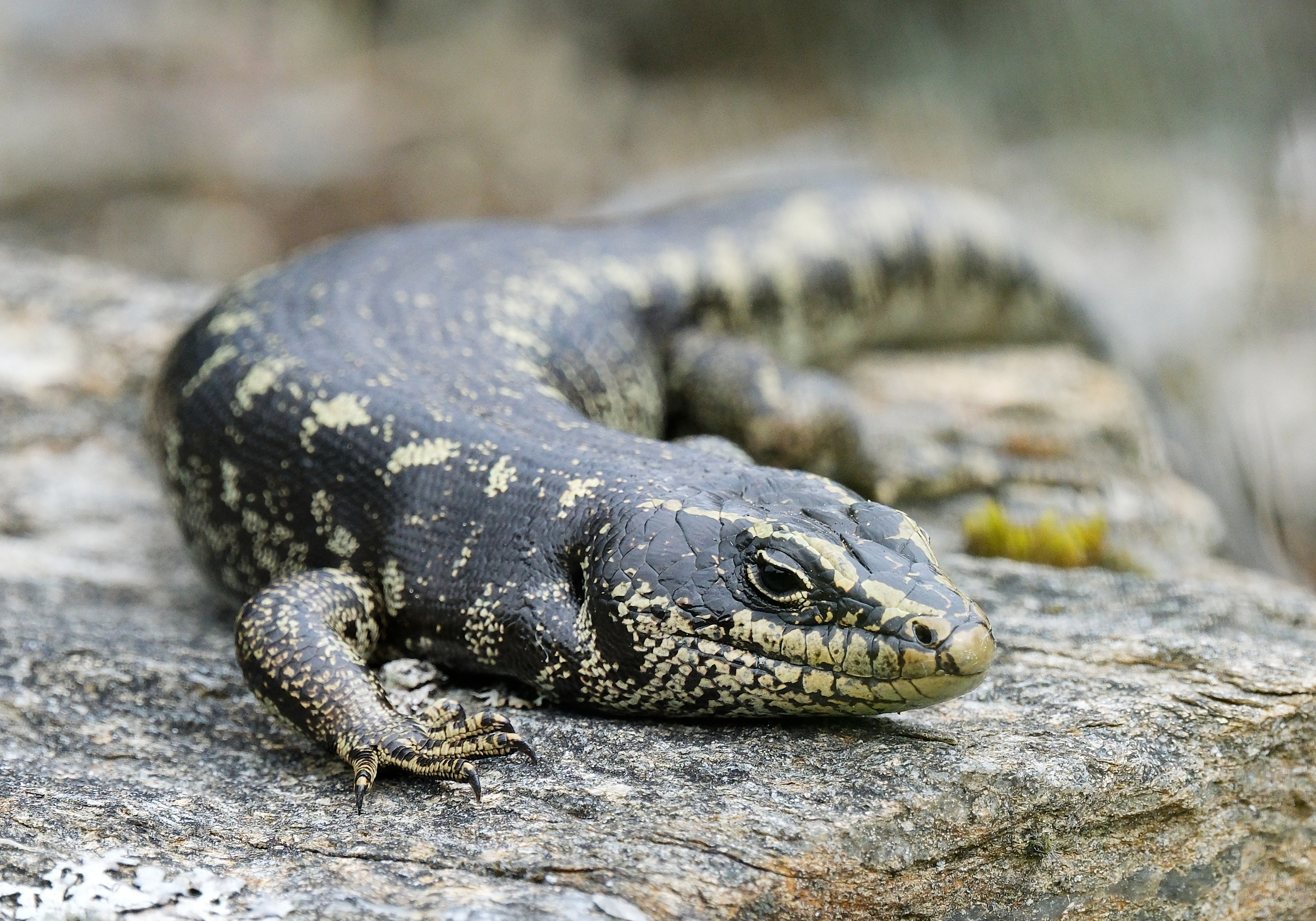
Otago skink (Oligosoma otagense) in an enclosure at Orokonui, Dunedin, New Zealand

The Otago skink has been assessed as Endangered by the IUCN, based on its very limited range and low total population. As of 2012 the Department of Conservation (DOC) has classified the Otago Skink as Nationally Critical under the New Zealand Threat Classification System, and research into conservation management is ongoing.

Most threats to the species seem to derive from anthropogenic sources. Agriculture and mining have over time taken up much of its habitat, altering the landscape and removing food sources and cover. This was compounded by the introduction of mammalian predators. The Otago skink, having historically been exposed to only limited predation from native birds, was heavily impacted by the spread of house cats, rabbits, ferrets, and weasels in conjunction with the increasing lack of sheltering habitats.

Anthropogenic threats appear to be combining with natural traits suich as low productivity and late sexual maturity to inhibit the recovery of the species. Additionally, the skink currently requires a specialised habitat, leaving the populations isolated and small with virtually no room for relocation or expanding.

Conservation efforts consisting of habitat protection, predator-proof fencing and predator control have been in force for some time. A management trial was developed in 2005 that lead to a major population recovery. Habitat conservation, predator control, and program monitoring became major objectives and have since proven successful, as skink numbers are slowly increasing. The Otago skink is currently fully protected under New Zealand law. DOC aims to continue efforts for management in situ, but some captive management has been carried out by breeders, conservation organizations, and zoos to ensure preservation from natural catastrophe. At one point, it was estimated that the species would become functionally extinct; work to protect the population has made this less likely, but the species is still considered to be at risk of extinction.
