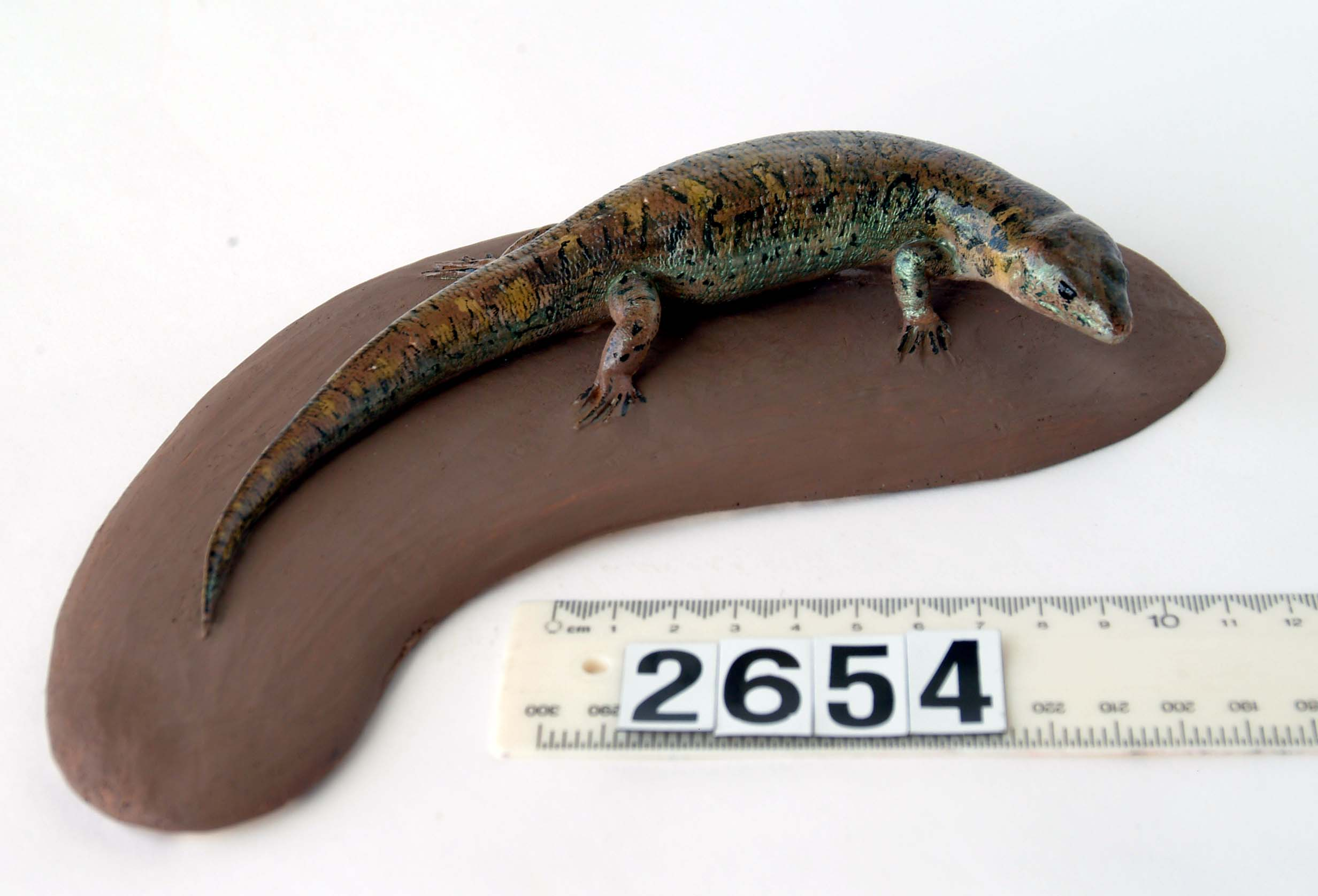

Conservation status
- Vulnerable (IUCN 3.1)

Scientific classification
- Kingdom: Animalia
- Phylum: Chordata
- Class: Reptilia
- Order: Squamata
- Family: Scincidae
- Genus: Oligosoma
- Species: O. alani

Binomial name
- Oligosoma alani (Robb, 1970)

Synonyms
- Leiolopisma alani Robb, 1970; Cyclodina alani — Hardy, 1977; Oligosoma alani — Chapple et al., 2009

= Robust skink =

Species of reptile

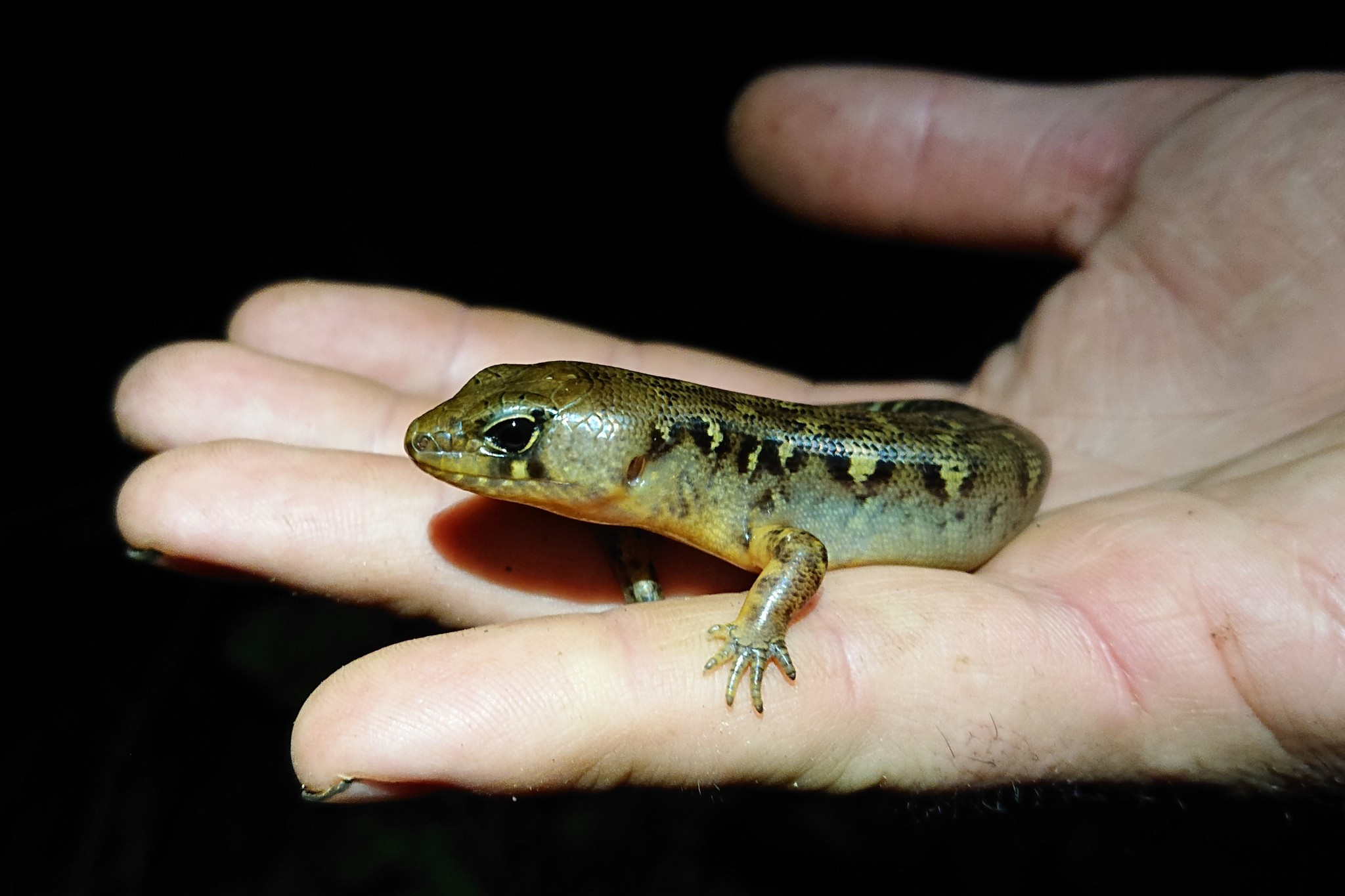
Oligosoma alani

Oligosoma alani, (formerly Cyclodina alani), also known as the robust skink, is the largest endemic skink to New Zealand. The robust skink is in the family Scincidae and found in the protected nature reserves of the Mercury Islands in the North Island of New Zealand. The robust skink has an at risk - recovering conservation status.

== Etymology ==
The specific epithet, alani, was given by the describer Joan Robb in honour of her nephew, Alan Robb.

== Distribution and habitat ==
Members of the North New Zealand herpetofauna have faced range declines due to mammalian predation and colonisation.

Following the first wave of mainland reptilian extinctions the robust skink is only found on rodent free islands off the North Island of New Zealand. Subfossils have been recorded from areas such as Motutapu Island (Auckland), Waitomo and Martinborough.

The robust skink is strictly nocturnal to maximise benefits and reduce costs of feeding. They are a forest-dwelling species, occupying seabird burrows, rocky areas and deep forest litter.

Like other Oligosoma skinks, the robust skink is physiologically restricted to moist microenvironments, as they are susceptible to water loss through their skin. Thus, they prefer areas of high humidity. To avoid water loss and maximise survival chances the skinks, spend the day in thick leaf litter, hide under rocks and find refuge in seabird burrows, such behaviour is both innate and learned.

== Description ==
The New Zealand skink fauna is incredibly diverse, coming from a monophyletic lineage to many species with varying morphologies.

The robust skink is the largest in New Zealand with a maximum recorded snout-vent length of 150mm^{2}, length of up to 33 cm and weight of 105 grams. These skinks are large with short limbs and toes, with a thickset body.

Characterising points of these skinks are large body, and mid-dark brown dorsal colouring, often broken up with large cream/pale blotches. Some individuals are seen to have black and white markings above shoulders with ventral areas of the body showing vivid reddish pink colouring. Below each dark eye, a black-edged teardrop shape can be seen. The snouts are round and blunt. Tails are thick and quickly taper off. Given their large shape and clear markings the robust skink is unlikely to be confused with other types of skinks. Robust skinks lack common reptile predator avoidance features such as body armour. Hence the evolution of camouflage patterning features allowing this species to be cryptic and avoid identification as food by predators.

Robust skinks can show extreme longevity in adulthood, with recorded ages of 33 and 55 years in captivity.

== Reproduction ==
=== Mating system ===
The specifics of the mating system of most Oligosoma skinks are unknown, especially for the robust skink. However, it is known this species is viviparous

A defining feature of New Zealand's endemic lizard fauna, which influences numerous aspects of reproduction and life history, is the very high incidence of viviparity (live-bearing). Viviparous lizards of New Zealand have, at most, one reproductive cycle per year.

=== Courtship behaviour ===
As seen in other lizard species, the mating behaviour in Oligosoma is rather violent. The male often repeatedly bites the female around the neck and head area causing scarring. This behaviour is common among skink species as a mate selection strategy, to assess the relative quality of the female.

=== Parental care ===
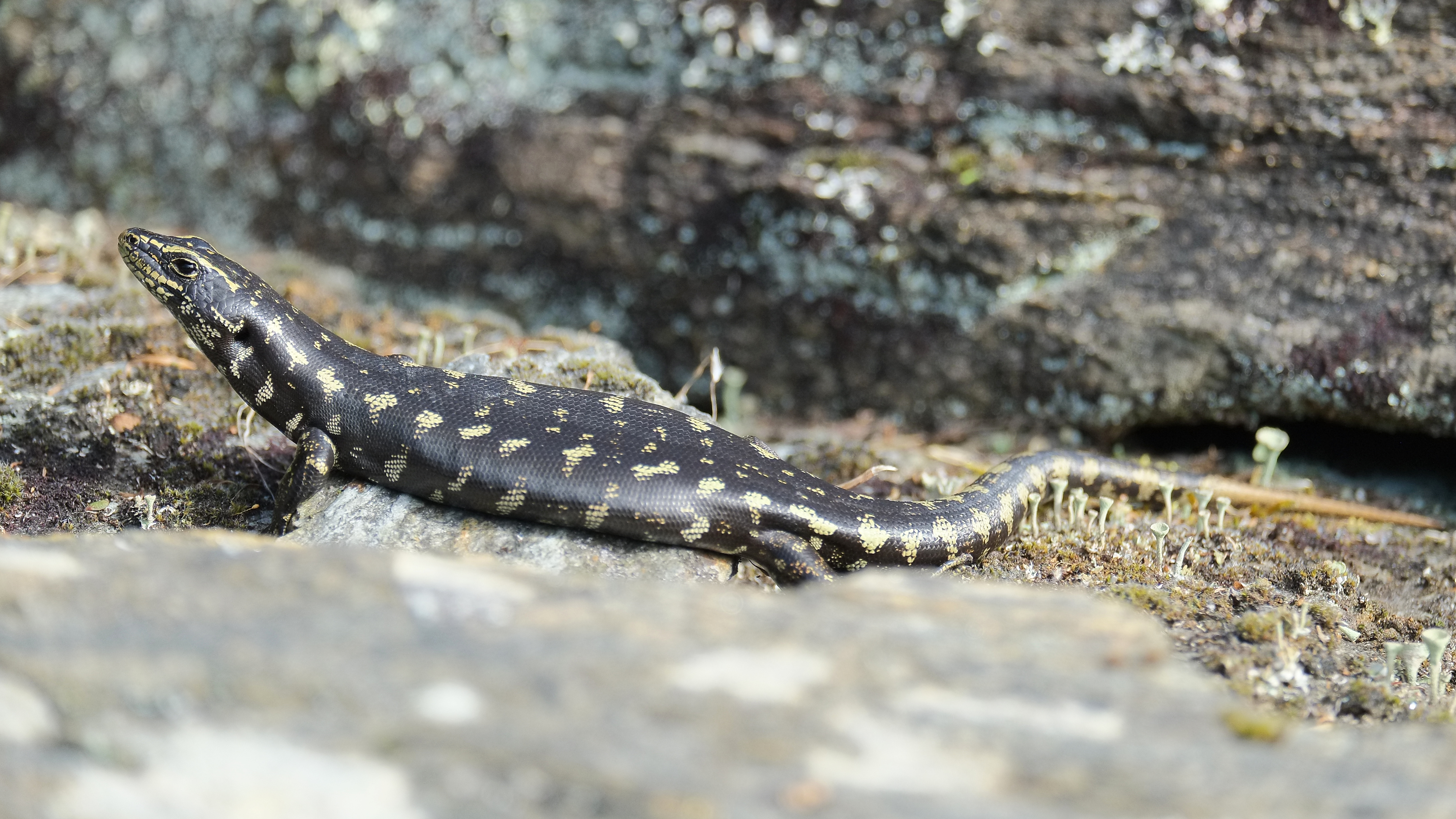
Otago skink basking in the sun, not Oligosoma alani

Interestingly pregnant females have been known to sun-bask during the day. Such behaviour is a widespread adaption among lizards in cool climates to enhance vitellogenesis and reduce gestation length by providing better thermal conditions for developing embryos. The behaviour of sunbathing is a form of parental care whereby the increased predation cost of sunbathing presents itself with the benefit of increasing survival off offspring and reproductive success.

The live-bearing of young in lizards has been found to increase parent-offspring interactions. Although, underdocumented, we can expect to see parental-care behaviour exhibited.

== Antipredator Behaviour ==
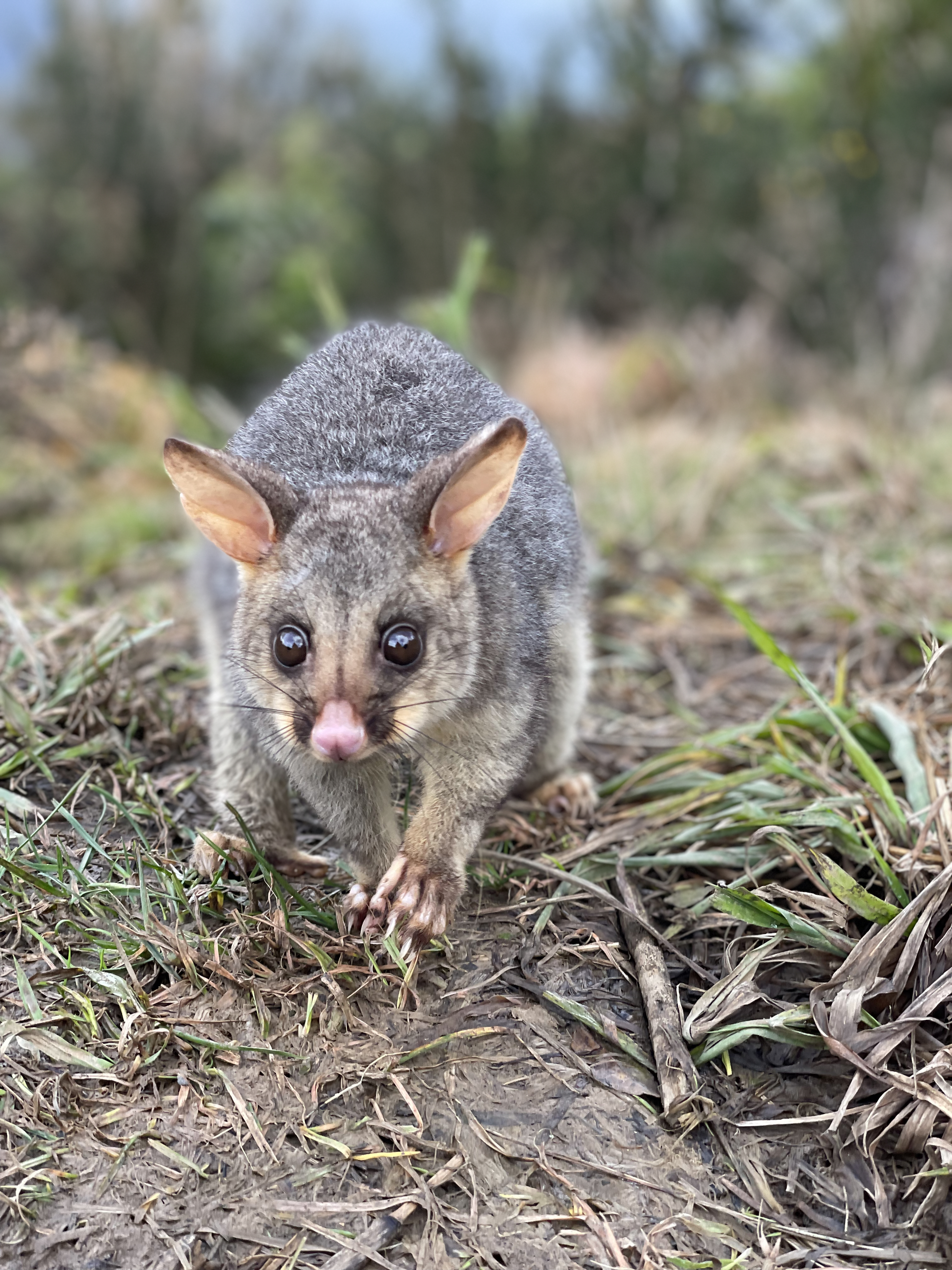
Common predator, Brush Tailed Possum.

The robust skink is predated on by introduced pests in New Zealand such as rats, possums and stoats.

Robust skinks use their fast sprint speed as an antipredator behaviour to outrun predators. The fast sprint speed of the robust skink is also linked to prey capture, social interactions, territory defence and reproduction. Juvenile females attain faster sprint speeds on average than adult males. Sprint speed in robust skinks appears relatively repeatable and suggests that sprint performance plays a key role in the biology of this species as a survival maximising behaviour. Differences in sprint speed could be due to increase in size of adults, or reflect a variation in selection pressures. For example, predators are more likely to hold greater pressure on juveniles. Varying sprint speed behavioural performance could also be linked to differences in intersexual habitat and foraging location choices, whereby males choose to explore microhabitats that favour other antipredator behaviours such as quick acceleration.

Other antipredator behaviours such as jumping, clinging, climbing, and digging are also used when outrunning predation is not a suitable option. As seen in other skinks of the Oligosoma genus, antipredator behaviour of reduced activity and retreating to burrows has been observed.

The body patterning and colouring can be seen as an evolutionary anti-predator detection adaptation as in similar skinks. Such behaviour is a form of background matching to the leaf litter habitat, making object detection difficult for predatory species.

== Social structure and behaviour ==
Little is known, however they are considered to be solitary and highly territorial.

Juvenile skinks from the same genus have been found to cluster together, this appears advantageous as smaller skinks are susceptible to greater predation. The aggregation of young skinks illustrates an anti-predator safety strategy, as they have increased protection in numbers.

== Diet ==
Robust skinks are nocturnal species, emerging during dusk to forage. Foraging takes place in the open air, the success of which is reliant on camouflage.

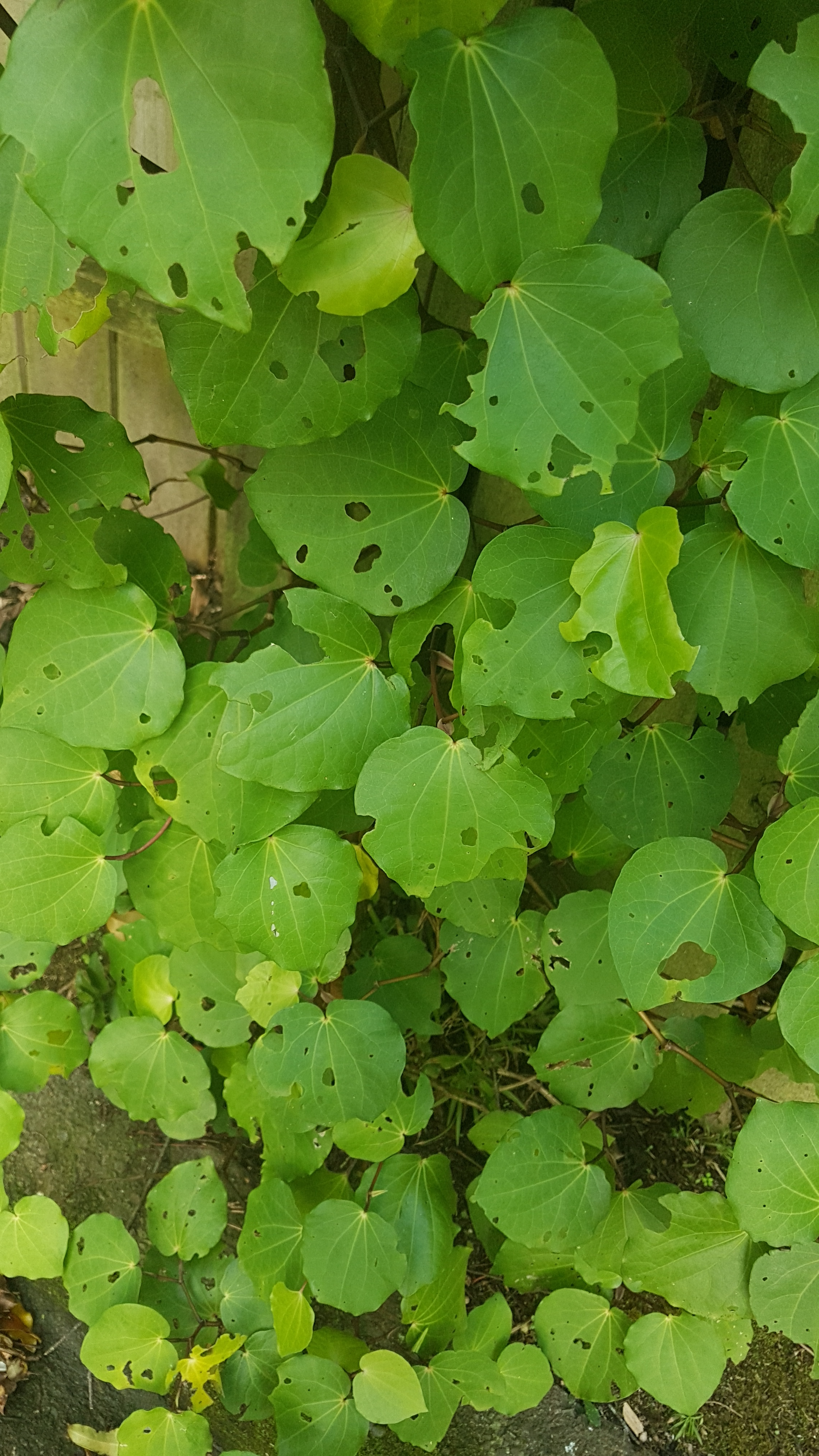
Kawakawa, common diet choice for Robust skink.

Robust skinks are omnivores, feeding primarily as insectivores on a wide range of invertebrates such as insects, crustaceans and molluscs. Robust skinks are also known to feed on plants such as native Kawakawa (Piper excelsum) and nightshade (Solanum). Robust skinks have also been recorded to feed on diving petrol chicks and smaller lizards.

Robust skinks feed mainly on mobile invertebrates.

== Conservation ==
The robust skink has fallen victim to introduced pests such as rats in New Zealand.

Once widespread on the mainland of North Island New Zealand, the robust skink is only found on the rodent-free Mercury islands and therefore was lost off the mainland when predators arrived.

On 30 April 1997, 30 robust skinks were transferred from Matapia Island to Motuopao Island, as species confined to islands are very vulnerable to the introduction of mammalian predators. These translocations intended to create additional populations of the threatened robust skink community which may well have occurred there before Pacific rats (Rattus exulans) arrived.

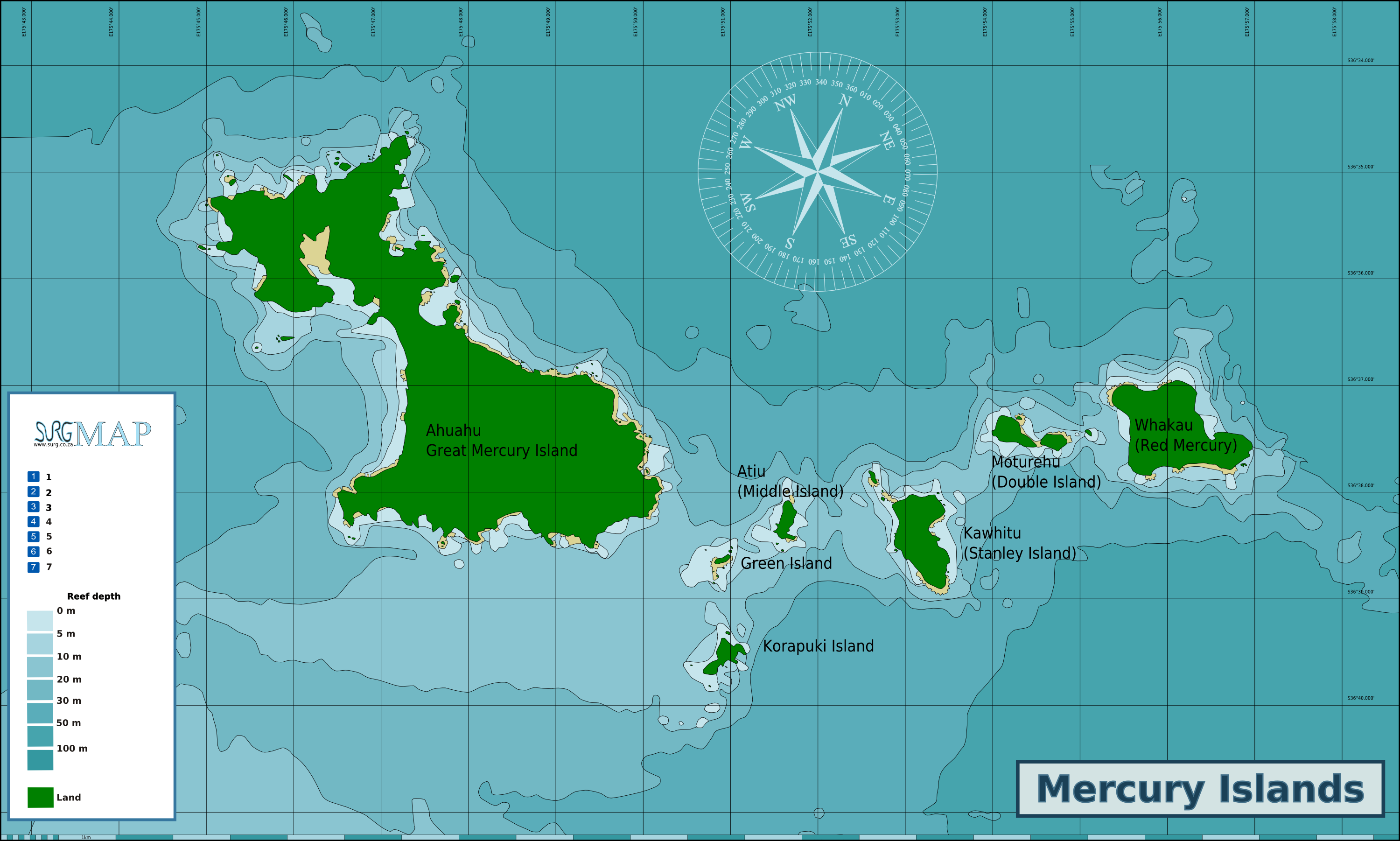
Mercury Islands, location where Robust skink are found.

Actions to reduce the robust skink vulnerability are identified in the Whitaker's and Robust Skink Recovery Plan.
