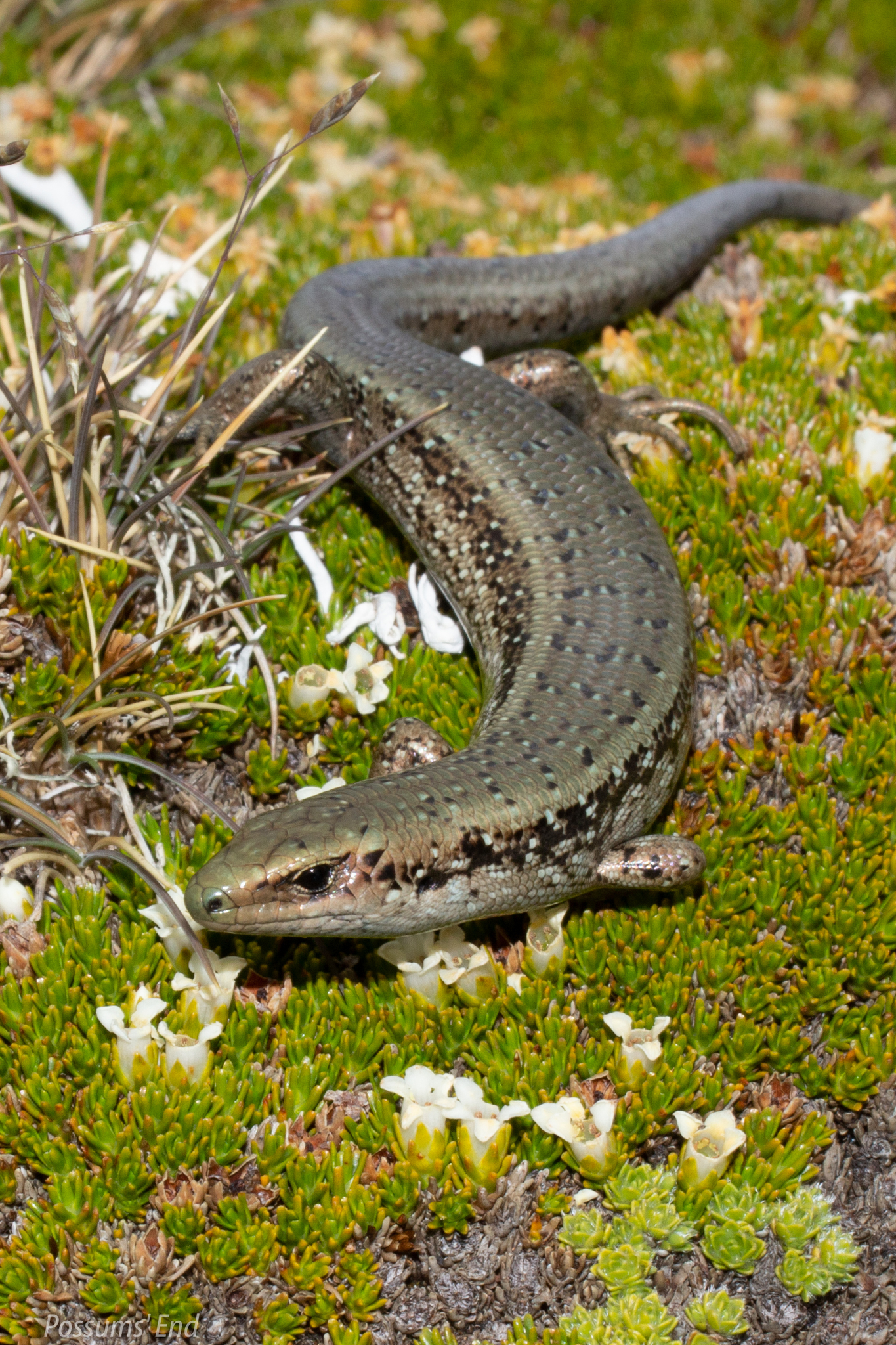

Conservation status
- Nationally Critical (NZ TCS)

Scientific classification
- Kingdom: Animalia
- Phylum: Chordata
- Class: Reptilia
- Order: Squamata
- Family: Scincidae
- Genus: Oligosoma
- Species: O. chloronoton

Binomial name
- Oligosoma chloronoton Hardy, 1977
- Distribution of the green skink on a map of the South Island Known native range

= Green skink =

Species of lizard

The Southland green skink (Oligosoma chloronoton) is a species of diurnal skink endemic to New Zealand. It was first described by Hardy in 1977.

== Distribution ==
Recent split within the Oligosoma chloronoton species complex, has reduced the distribution of Southland green skinks to mainland Southland and a few islands off Stewart Island in Foveaux Strait. They can be found in a range of habitats from coastal to alpine, preferring to remain near dense vegetation or rock piles, where they feed mostly on insects and some berries.

== Physical characteristics ==
This large species of skink weighs up to 23.3g and has a snout-vent length of 125mm, with an intact tail slightly longer than this length.

Individuals typically have a relatively blunt snout, with back (dorsal) colouring ranging from pink- or copper-brown to green, from which they take their name, with black or light green spots (ocelli) extending the length of the body from behind the head to the tail tip. The underside (ventral) colouring ranges from light to dark grey, often with pink hues, and may be of one solid colour or with black flecks. The side (lateral) colouring is a broad, dark coloured, tending to black band, usually with many white, gold and brown flecks. The lower side (lateral) colouring is also speckled, with white, golden brown and black flecks.

The green skink has very dark brown eyes, and coppery brown to black coloured soles on its feet, with 16-24 scales (subdigital lamellae) under its fingers and toes.

Juvenile green skinks look similar to adults, but can be very dark on their undersides and sides of their body.

Similar species are the Otago green skink and lakes skink, which the Southland green skink can be distinguished from with its stouter body and shorter, blunter snout, and being smaller than the Stewart Island green skink, which does not have the same spots (ocelli).

== Life cycle and phenology ==
Green skinks breed once per year, with 1-4 young produced in late summer (February-March).

== Conservation status ==
As of 2021 the Department of Conservation (DOC) classified the green skink as Nationally Critical under the New Zealand Threat Classification System, in part due to the reclassification of the species within the species complex and fewer animals observed in their reduced geographic area. Green skinks are also vulnerable due to their large size and habitat loss through land modification.
