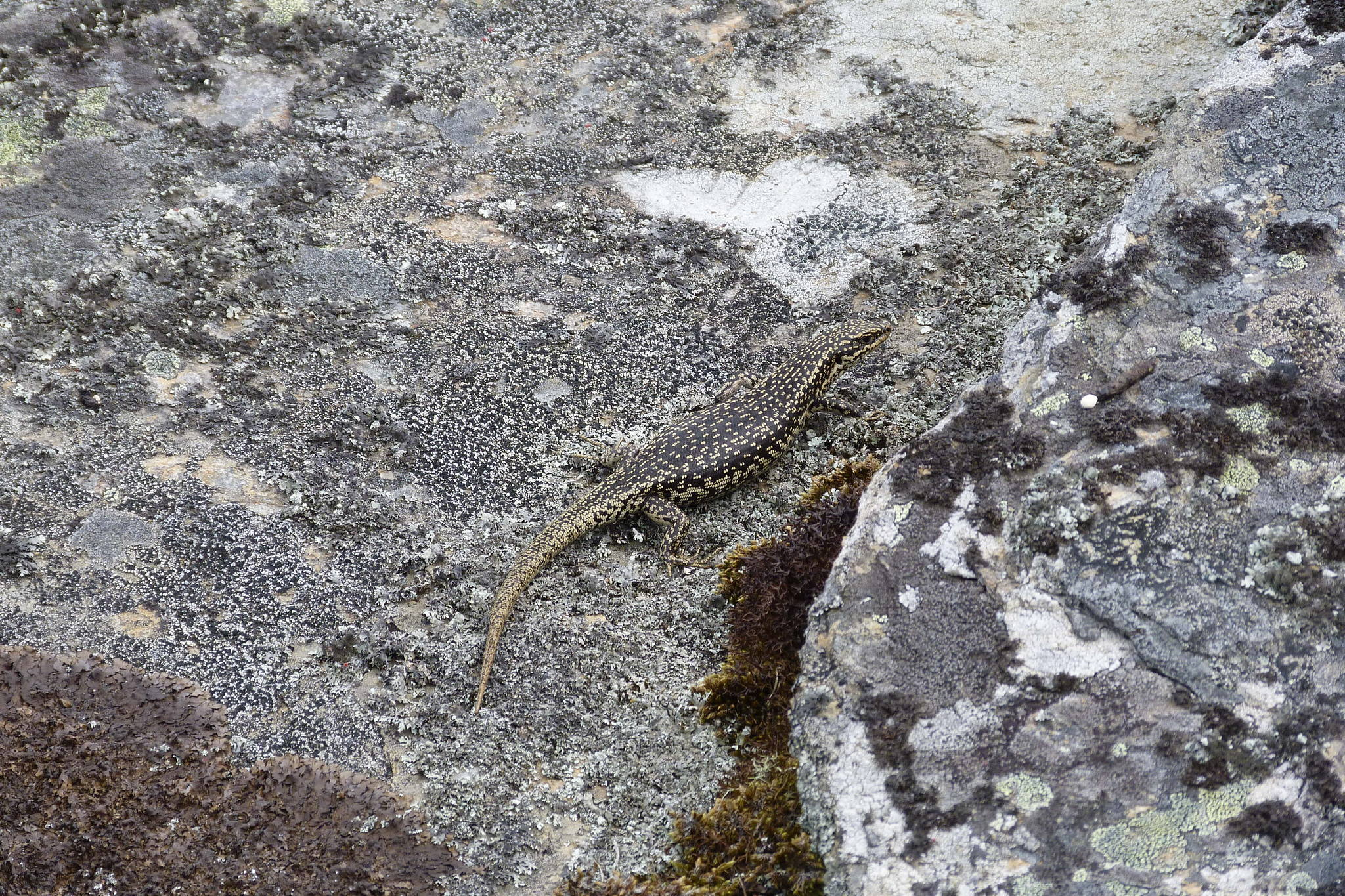

Conservation status
- Endangered (IUCN 3.1)

Scientific classification
- Kingdom: Animalia
- Phylum: Chordata
- Class: Reptilia
- Order: Squamata
- Family: Scincidae
- Genus: Oligosoma
- Species: O. grande

Binomial name
- Oligosoma grande (Gray, 1845)
- Distribution of the grand skink on a map of the South Island Known native range

Synonyms
- Dilophyrus grandis Gray, 1845

= Grand skink =

Species of lizard

The grand skink (Oligosoma grande) is an endangered species of large skink endemic to the central Otago region of New Zealand.

== Physical characteristics ==
Grand skinks are relatively large compared to other New Zealand skinks, capable of growing to lengths up to 11 inches (29 cm). They are marked with yellow-green speckling, which provides excellent camouflage in their rocky habitat of lichen-covered rocks and schist outcrops. Like most skinks, grand skinks are omnivores and feed on a wide variety of insects and fleshy fruits.

== Habitat ==
Grand skinks are only found in very specific locations in Otago, and are typically limited to the large schist rock outcroppings found in that region. They can often be seen sunning themselves on these rocks. As of 2000, the range of the grand skink has decreased by roughly 90%. Although it was once widespread, land use change, particularly the intensification of farming, and the introduction of mammalian predators has led to a decline in the population. The New Zealand Department of Conservation estimates that there are only 2,000 to 5,000 individual grand skinks remaining.

== Conservation status ==
As at the last reassessment in 2012, grand skinks have been classified as Nationally Endangered under the New Zealand Threat Classification System.
