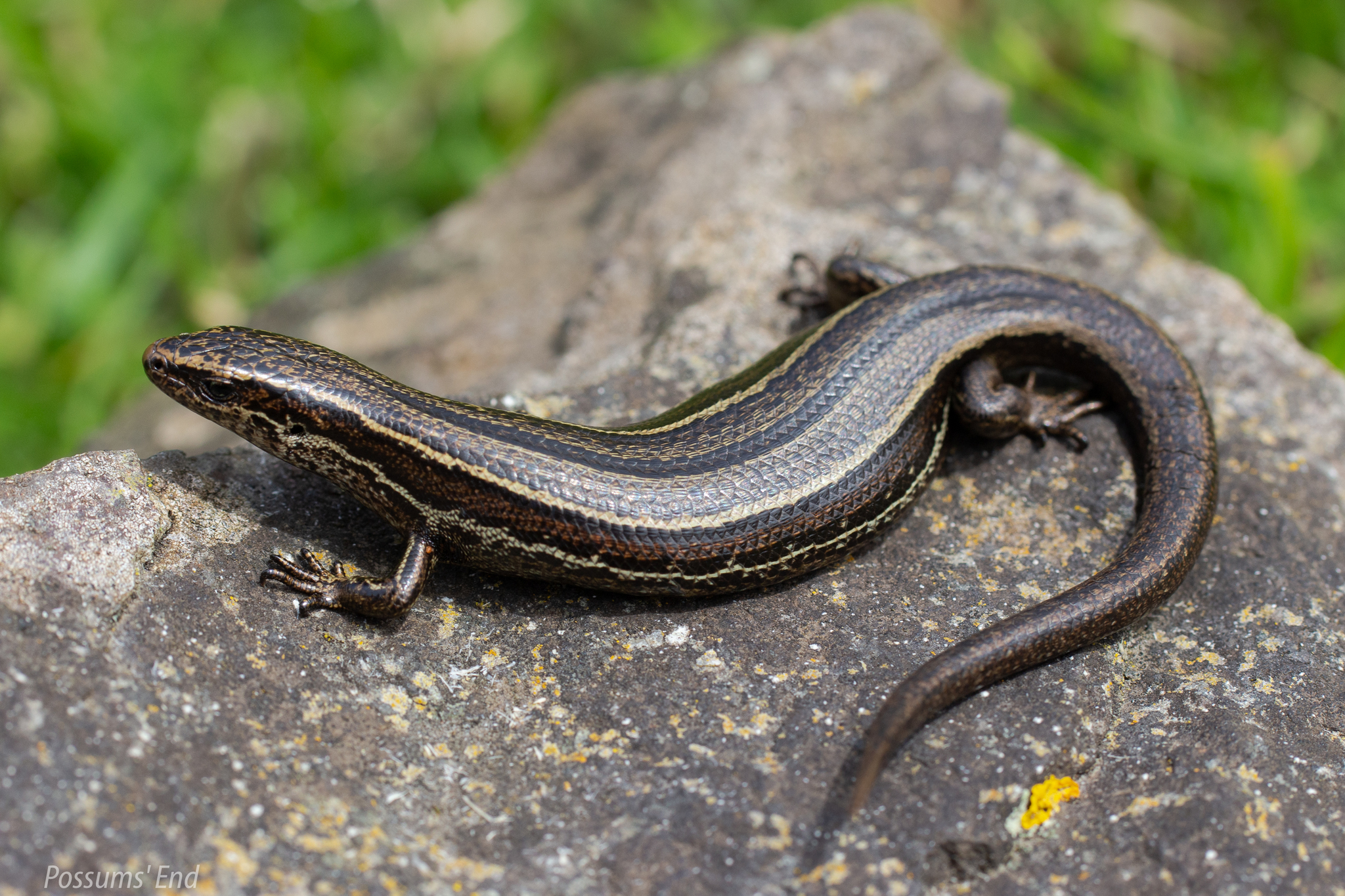

Conservation status
- Vulnerable (IUCN 3.1)

Scientific classification
- Kingdom: Animalia
- Phylum: Chordata
- Class: Reptilia
- Order: Squamata
- Family: Scincidae
- Genus: Oligosoma
- Species: O. inconspicuum

Binomial name
- Oligosoma inconspicuum (Patterson & Daugherty, 1990)

Synonyms
- Leiolopisma inconspicuum Patterson & Daugherty 1990; Oligosoma inconspicuum CHAPPLE et al 2009

= Cryptic skink =

Species of lizard

The cryptic skink (Oligosoma inconspicuum) is a nationally vulnerable species of skink native to New Zealand.

== Conservation status ==
As of 2012 the Department of Conservation (DOC) classified the cryptic skink as At Risk under the New Zealand Threat Classification System. It was judged as meeting the criteria for At Risk threat status as a result of it having a low to high ongoing or predicted decline.
