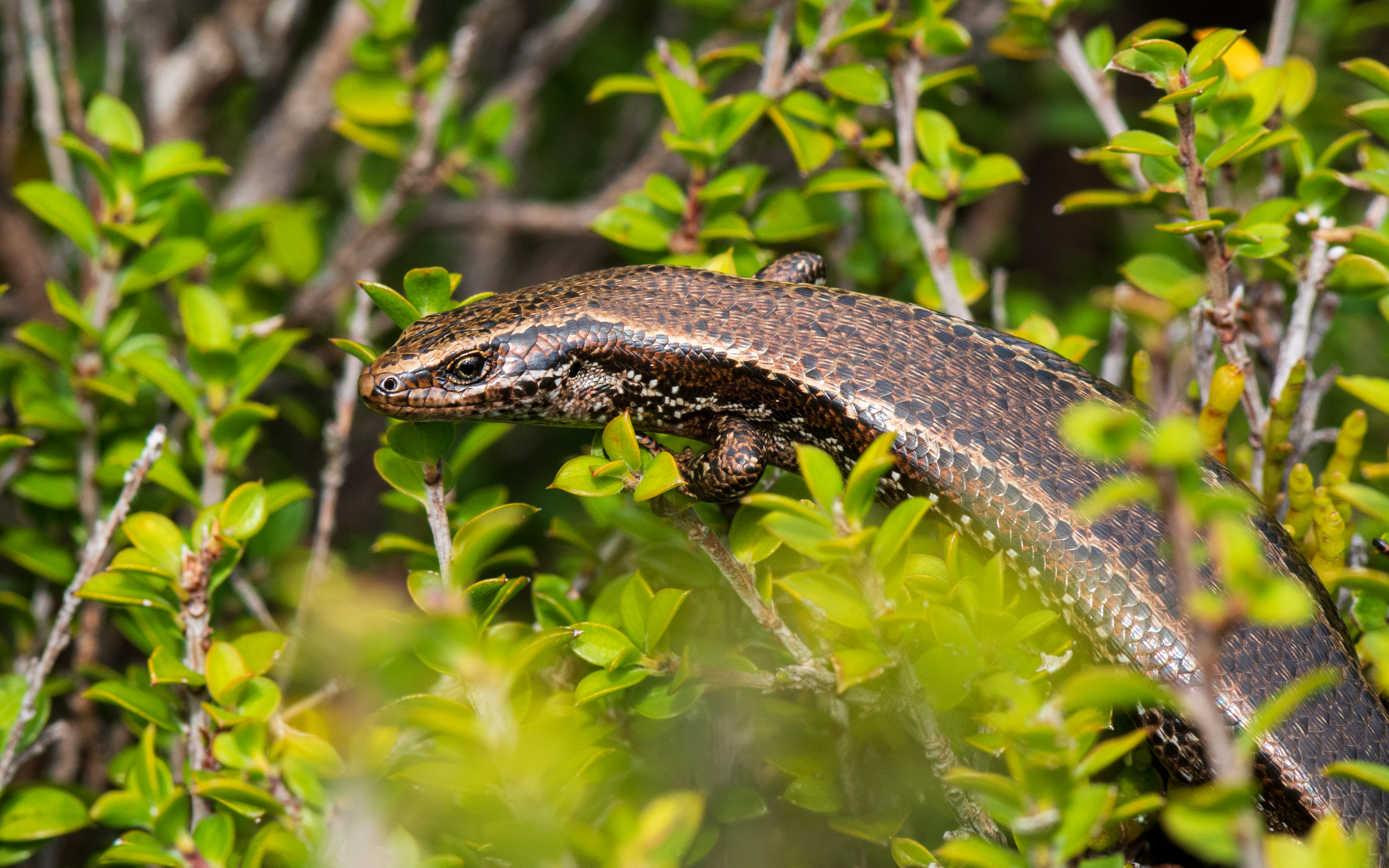

Conservation status
- Least Concern (IUCN 3.1)

Scientific classification
- Kingdom: Animalia
- Phylum: Chordata
- Class: Reptilia
- Order: Squamata
- Family: Scincidae
- Genus: Oligosoma
- Species: O. notosaurus

Binomial name
- Oligosoma notosaurus (Patterson & Daugherty, 1990)
- Distribution of Oligosoma notosaurus on a map of the Chatham Islands Known native range

Synonyms
- Leiolopisma notosaurus Patterson & Daugherty, 1990

= Oligosoma notosaurus =

Species of lizard

The southern skink (Oligosoma notosaurus) is a species of skink in the family Scincidae. It is endemic to New Zealand.

== Range ==
This species is only known to inhabit Stewart Island and Codfish Island, south of the South Island, New Zealand. It is also known from Betsy Island in the Stewart Island archipelago. It has been recorded at altitudes between sea level and 700 m.

== Conservation status ==
As of 2012 the Department of Conservation (DOC) classified the southern skink as Not Threatened under the New Zealand Threat Classification System. It is one of the most common lizard species in the Stewart Island archipelago.

== Habitat and ecology ==
This species is found in sand dunes, grasslands, wetlands, scrub and rocky areas, and forest clearings.
