= Fiordland skink =

Conservation status
- Near Threatened (IUCN 3.1)

Scientific classification
- Kingdom: Animalia
- Phylum: Chordata
- Class: Reptilia
- Order: Squamata
- Family: Scincidae
- Genus: Oligosoma
- Species: O. acrinasum

Binomial name
- Oligosoma acrinasum (Hardy, 1977)
- Distribution of the Fiordland skink on a map of the South Island Known native range

Species of lizard

The Fiordland skink (Oligosoma acrinasum) is a species of skink endemic to the Fiordland temperate forests ecoregion of South Island, New Zealand. The Fiordland skink is found on one mainland locations and the exposed rocky shores of numerous islands along the Fiordland coast. Their distribution has declined due to introduced predators. Currently it lives only on foreshore rocks and boulder beaches on the Fiordland coast. It is abundant, even extremely abundant, in areas free from mammalian predators, but it barely survives where predators are present.

This species was successfully translocated to Hāwea Island in 1988. It has managed to naturally recolonize another island after rats were eradicated.
