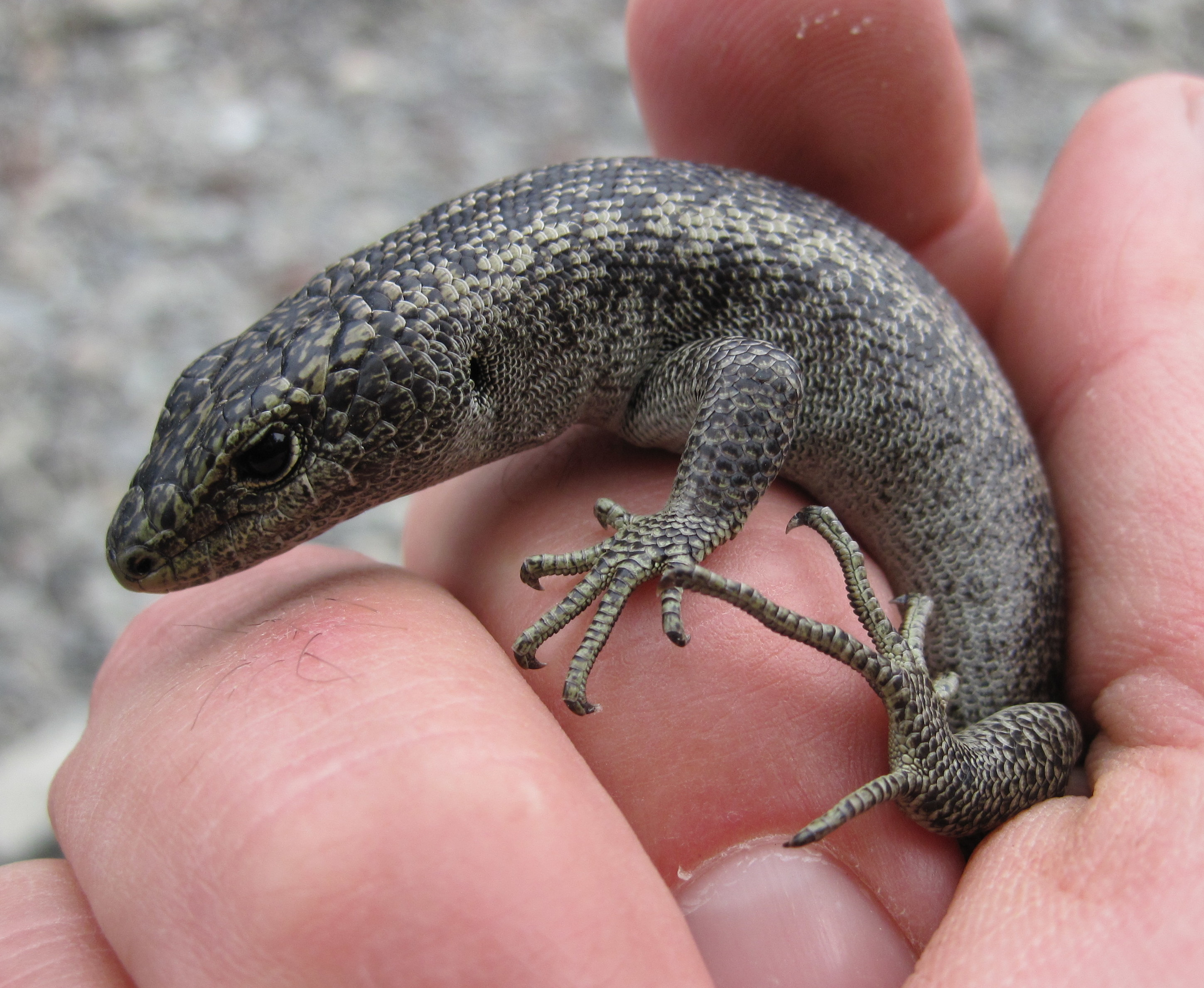

Conservation status
- Endangered (IUCN 3.1)

Scientific classification
- Kingdom: Animalia
- Phylum: Chordata
- Class: Reptilia
- Order: Squamata
- Family: Scincidae
- Genus: Oligosoma
- Species: O. waimatense

Binomial name
- Oligosoma waimatense (McCann, 1955)
- Distribution of the scree skink on a map of the South Island Known native range

= Scree skink =

Species of lizard

The scree skink (Oligosoma waimatense) is a species of skink native to several sites throughout the South Island of New Zealand. A member of the family Scincidae, it was described by Geoff Patterson in 1997. It favours rocky habitats, particularly greywacke screes. Threats to scree skinks include predation by introduced mammals, weed encroachment, human interference and (for stream bed populations) severe flood events.

== Conservation status ==
As of 2012 the Department of Conservation (DOC) classified the scree skink as Nationally Vulnerable under the New Zealand Threat Classification System.
