= Striped skink =

The term striped skink may refer to any one of several species of skinks:

- Ctenotus robustus, a comb-eared skink from Australia
- Trachylepis striata or Euprepes striata, a skink from Africa
- Oligosoma striatum from New Zealand, a relative of the mastiff skinks
