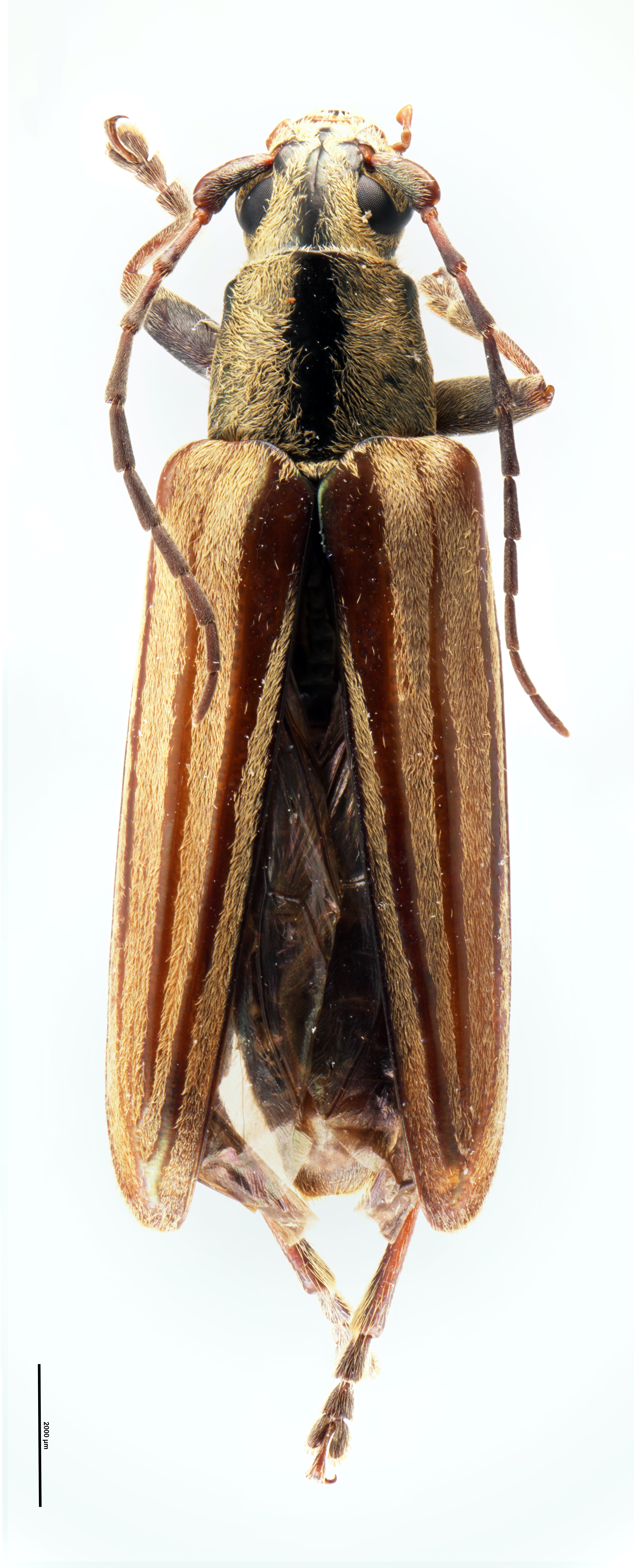
- Holotype

Scientific classification
- Domain: Eukaryota
- Kingdom: Animalia
- Phylum: Arthropoda
- Class: Insecta
- Order: Coleoptera
- Suborder: Polyphaga
- Infraorder: Cucujiformia
- Family: Cerambycidae
- Genus: Coptomma
- Species: C. marrisi

Binomial name
- Coptomma marrisi Song & Wang, 2003

= Coptomma marrisi =

Longicorn beetle native to New Zealand

Coptomma marrisi is a species of longhorn beetle only known from Great Island in the Three Kings Islands, New Zealand.

== Taxonomy ==
In a revision of the genus Coptomma, Deping Song and Qiao Wang of Massey University synonymised two species and described a new one, Coptomma marrisi, from a male and female collected by Lincoln University entomologist John Marris on an expedition to the Three Kings Islands in 1996. The holotype and paratype were deposited in the Lincoln University Entomology Research Collection. One previous specimen had been collected in 1970 by a DSIR Entomology Division expedition, and lodged in the New Zealand Arthropod Collection.

Song and Wang chose the name marrisi to honour the collector of the holotype, John Marris.

== Description ==
Coptomma marrisi most resembles the striped longhorn beetle C. lineatum, which is widely distributed through mainland New Zealand. It differs in having a wide frons, a hairless stripe on the thorax, and reddish-brown femurs. Its body is just over 15 mm (females) and 11–12 mm (males), and is reddish-brown with four long yellow stripes on each wing cover.

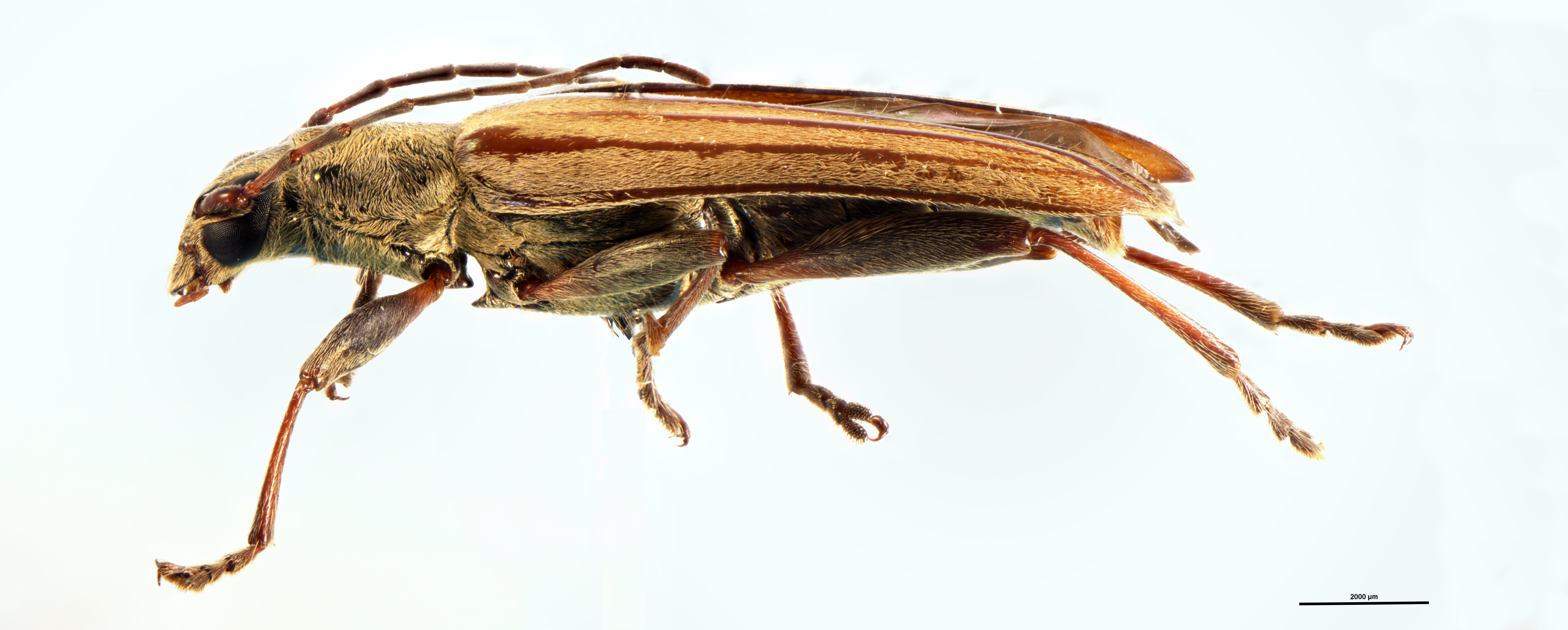
Lateral view

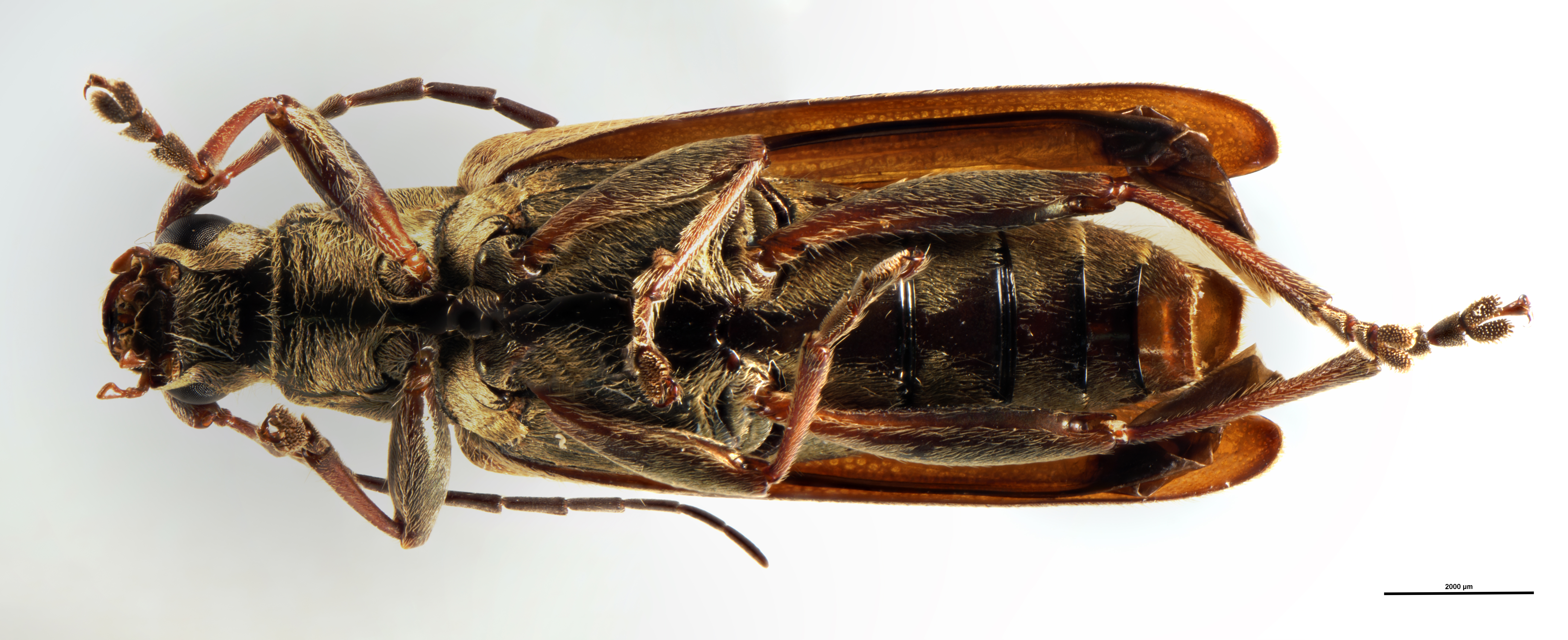
Ventral

== Habitat and distribution ==
This species is known only from Great Island in the Three Kings Islands, and like the Three Kings click beetle Amychus manawatawhi, it may have evolved and persisted on Great Island, rather than being a remnant of a formerly-widespread species. The Three Kings have been isolated from mainland since the Miocene, and are rich in endemic species.

Adult beetles were collected on coastal plants, particularly Kunzea, in December. Nothing else is known about their possible host.

== Conservation ==
This species has not been assessed by the Department of Conservation for possible threats; other species on the Three Kings have been classed as "Naturally Uncommon".
