= The Brothers (New Zealand) =

Group of islands in Cook Strait, New Zealand

Ngāwhatu-kai-ponu
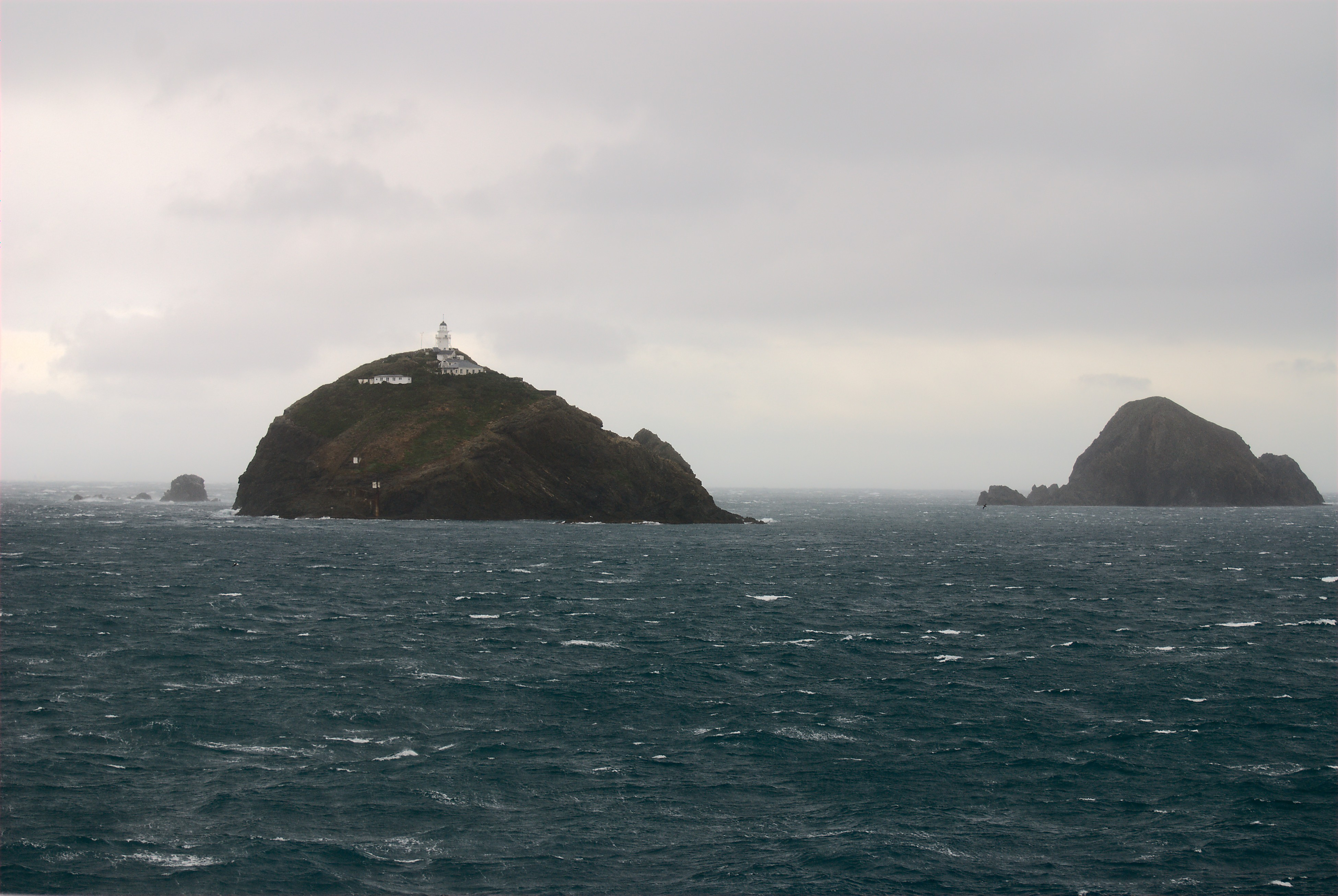
- North Brother (left) and South Brother

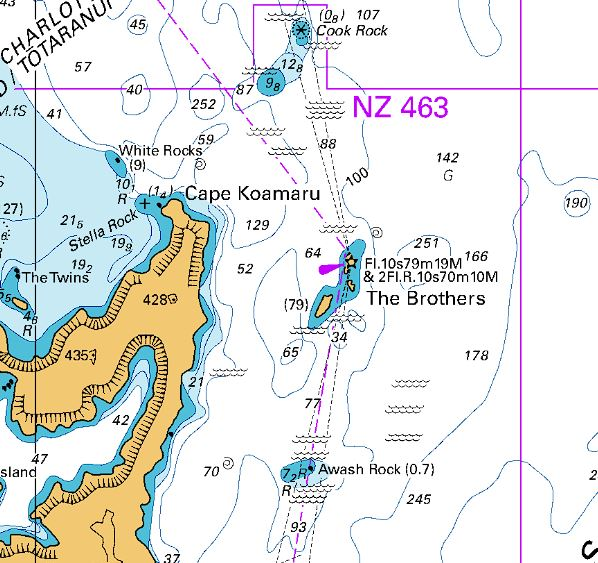
- Extract from Chart NZ 46 Cook Strait

Geography
- Coordinates: 41.114°S 174.433°E
- Major islands: South Brother, North Brother
- Area: 0.17 km^{2} (0.066 sq mi)
- Highest elevation: 66 m (217 ft)

Administration
- New Zealand

Demographics
- Population: 0

The Brothers (Māori: Ngāwhatu-kai-ponu) is a group of small islands in Cook Strait, New Zealand, off the east coast of Cape Koamaru, Arapaoa Island. The islands are a restricted-access wildlife sanctuary administered by the Department of Conservation.

== Islands ==
The Brothers form two small island groups, each containing one main island and a number of tiny islets. The main islands are simply called North Brother and South Brother. South Brother is the larger of the two, covering some 9.5 hectares (23 acres), but the 4-hectare (9.9-acre) North Brother is slightly more elevated, rising to 66 metres (217 ft). Most of the smaller islets lie in a small arc south of North Brother, with the largest being only some one hectare in area.

Awash Rock is about 2 nmi (3.7 km; 2.3 mi) south of The Brothers. At high water it is just visible, but strong currents flow around it, as they do between Cape Koamaru and The Brothers, where there are often over falls and whirlpools.

== History ==
The Māori name for the group, Ngāwhatu-kai-ponu, literally means "the eyes that witnessed" and according to tradition it refers to the eyeballs of the giant octopus, Te Wheke-a-Muturangi, that Kupe battled. The islets were considered tapu to Māori. Paddlers making their first crossing of Raukawa/Cook Strait were blindfolded with kawakawa leaves as it was considered bad luck to see the islands on their first crossing; tohunga and ariki were exempted from this rule.

During Captain James Cook's first visit to the area, HMS Endeavour was very nearly wrecked on the Brothers, as a lack of wind and strong tide drove the ship towards the rocks. A change in the direction of the tide saved the ship.

== Lighthouse ==
The Brothers Island lighthouse is located on the summit of North Brother. The lighthouse was built in 1877 and is New Zealand's only rock station. It replaced the Mana Island lighthouse.

The first call for a lighthouse on the Brothers was in 1851 after the Maria sank near Cape Terawhiti. When a lighthouse was erected on Mana Island to serve Cook Strait comment was made in the Marlborough Press that despite the expense it would have been better to have put one on the Brothers. This request was again repeated in the Evening Post in 1870. In 1867 SS Queen sank after hitting Cook's Rock, just to the north of the Brothers; Cook's Rock was lit by a red light once the lighthouse opened. In 1872 the barque City of Newcastle was lost because the Captain mistook the Mana Island light for the entrance to Wellington Harbour. In 1874 a report titled New Zealand Coast Lights by Captain Johnson was tabled in Parliament and, among others, recommended removing the Mana Island light in favour of a light on the Brothers.

Construction of the lighthouse was difficult because of its isolation and lack of fresh water. Building materials for construction were unable to be delivered to the island for 2 months because of the weather and sea conditions. Workers had to construct huts as tents could not be pitched on the rock. The oil powered light began operation on 24 September 1877. This was replaced in August 1954 to electricity supplied by a 10 hp diesel engine coupled to three 6.8kW generators. A further upgrade occurred in August 1990 when the light was switched to a 50 watt tungsten halogen solar powered beacon and fully automated.

The light was kept by a lighthouse keeper until August 1990. Since then the light has been remotely monitored from Wellington. The lights isolation was very hard on the keepers and supplying the island challenging. Supplies were bought in from Picton and the lighthouse keepers provided weather reports on local conditions at 4.30 am daily, then every hour on the hour till 4 pm.

== Endangered species ==
Endangered species on The Brothers
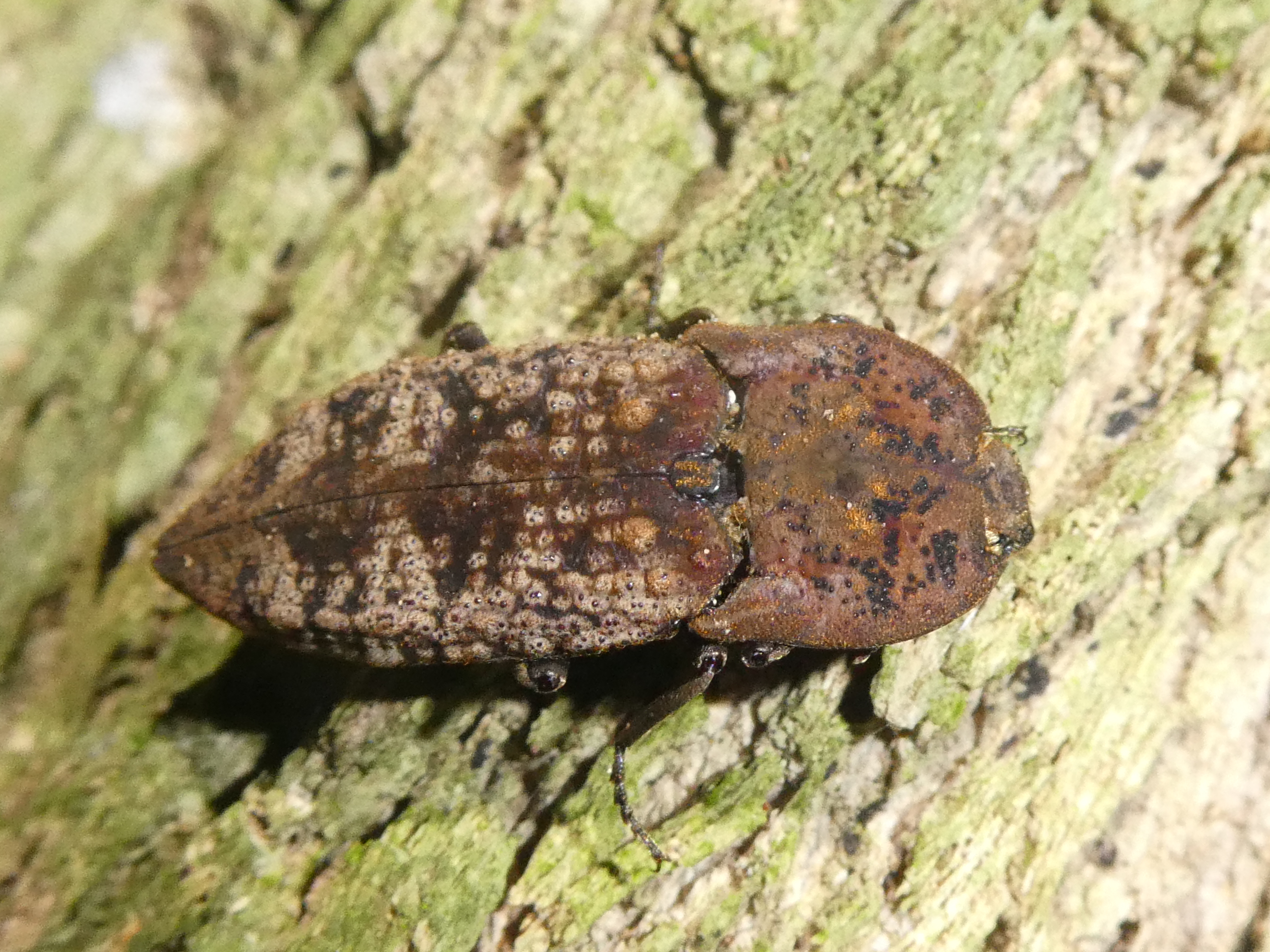
Cook Strait Click Beetle

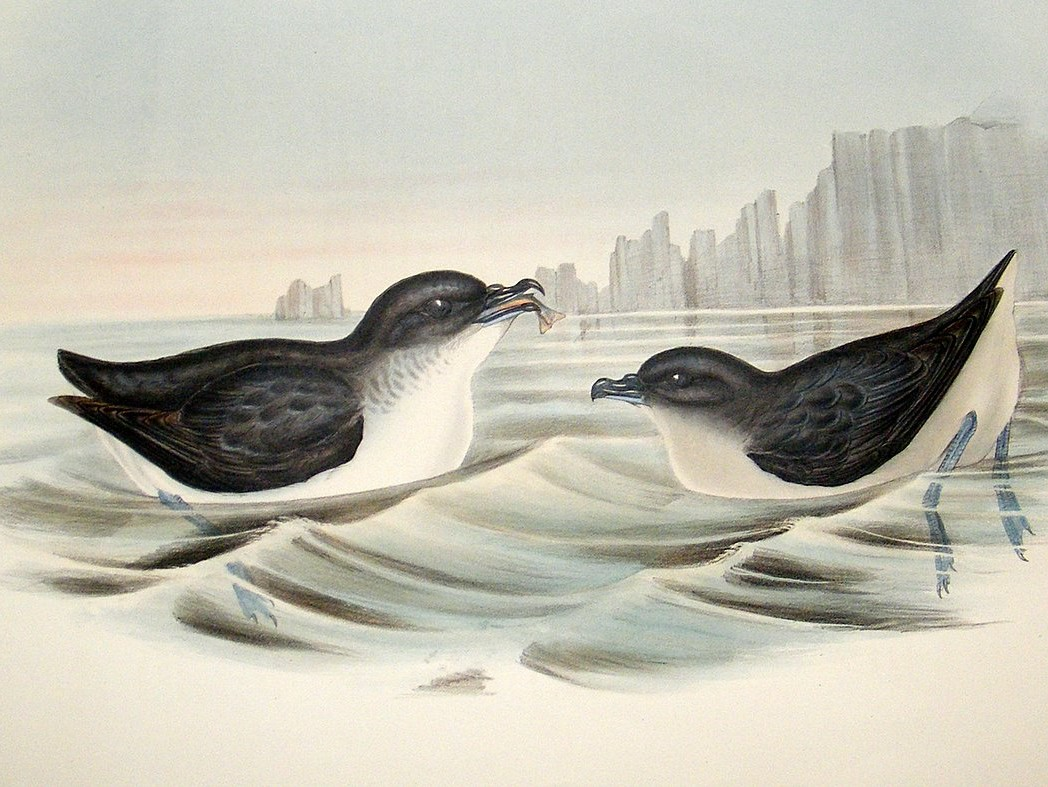
Diving Petrel

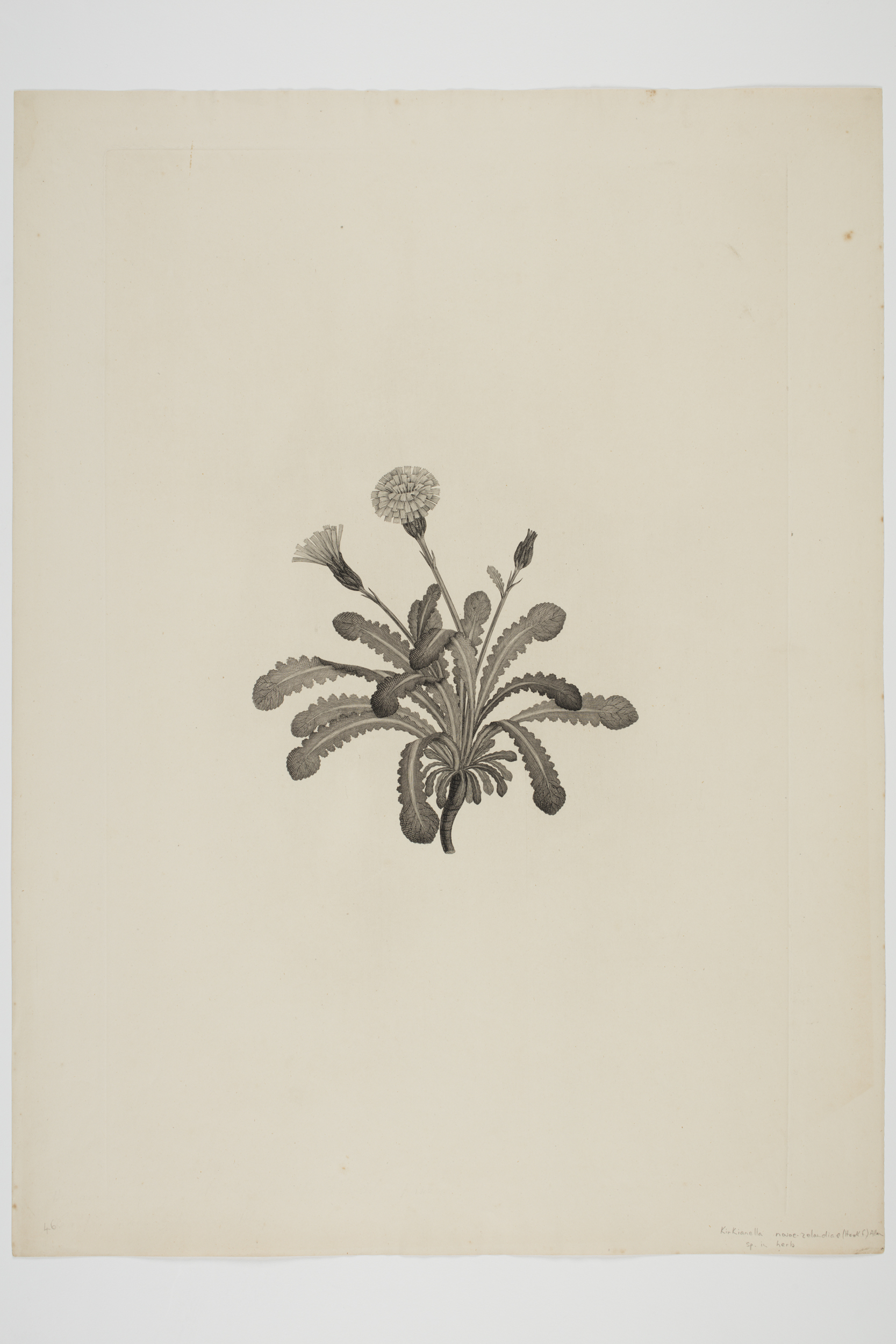
Kirkianella novae-zealandiae.

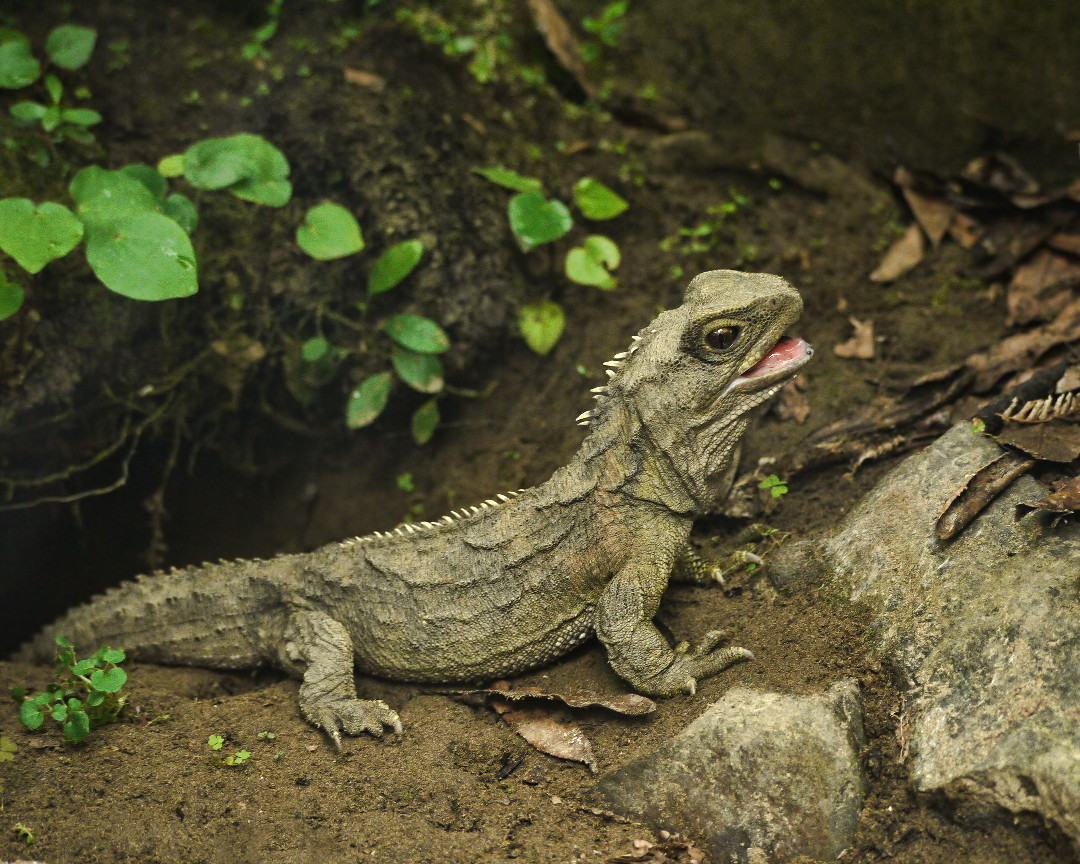
Tuatara.

In 1970 The Brothers were declared a sanctuary. North Brother Island is a sanctuary for a rare reptile subspecies, the Brothers Island tuatara (Sphenodon punctatus guntheri), and is the type locality for a rare beetle species, the Cook Strait click beetle (Amychus granulatus), although the latter is possibly extinct there now.

Others include the diving petrel and the extremely rare dandelion looking plant Kirkianella novae-zealandiae. This plant is only found on North Brother Island and Arapaoa Island. Department of Conservation staff visit the island about four times a year to remove invasive species to protect these and other endangered species.

== Other ==
The Brothers lighthouse featured on one of the 1947 New Zealand Government Life Insurance Department lighthouse series postage stamps, specifically the 6d stamp.

== Climate ==
Climate data for The Brothers (1991–2020)
Month	Jan	Feb	Mar	Apr	May	Jun	Jul	Aug	Sep	Oct	Nov	Dec	Year
Mean daily maximum °C (°F)	18.7 (65.7)	18.8 (65.8)	18.0 (64.4)	16.3 (61.3)	14.7 (58.5)	12.8 (55.0)	12.0 (53.6)	12.5 (54.5)	13.4 (56.1)	14.7 (58.5)	15.9 (60.6)	17.5 (63.5)	15.4 (59.8)
Daily mean °C (°F)	16.4 (61.5)	16.7 (62.1)	15.9 (60.6)	14.4 (57.9)	12.9 (55.2)	11.1 (52.0)	10.3 (50.5)	10.7 (51.3)	11.6 (52.9)	12.6 (54.7)	13.7 (56.7)	15.3 (59.5)	13.5 (56.2)
Mean daily minimum °C (°F)	14.2 (57.6)	14.6 (58.3)	13.8 (56.8)	12.6 (54.7)	11.1 (52.0)	9.4 (48.9)	8.6 (47.5)	8.9 (48.0)	9.7 (49.5)	10.4 (50.7)	11.5 (52.7)	13.1 (55.6)	11.5 (52.7)
Average rainfall mm (inches)	39.3 (1.55)	42.3 (1.67)	42.6 (1.68)	55.7 (2.19)	61.8 (2.43)	80.4 (3.17)	64.9 (2.56)	66.4 (2.61)	62.7 (2.47)	81.9 (3.22)	49.0 (1.93)	49.3 (1.94)	696.3 (27.42)
Source: NIWA

== See also ==
- List of islands of New Zealand
- List of islands
- Desert island
