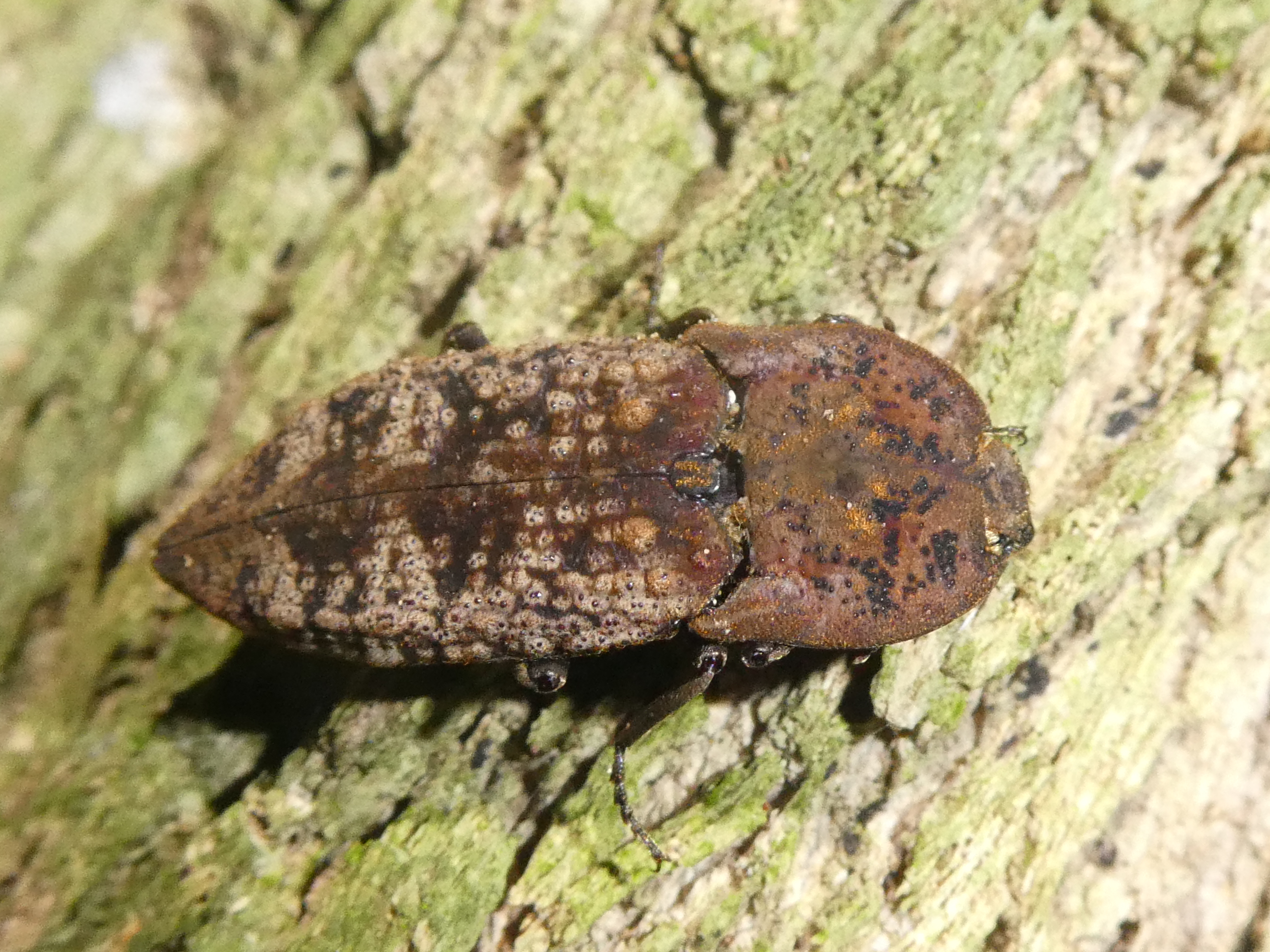
- Amychus granulatus

Scientific classification
- Domain: Eukaryota
- Kingdom: Animalia
- Phylum: Arthropoda
- Class: Insecta
- Order: Coleoptera
- Suborder: Polyphaga
- Infraorder: Elateriformia
- Family: Elateridae
- Subtribe: Denticollina
- Genus: Amychus; Pascoe, 1876

= Amychus =

Genus of beetles

Amychus is a genus of beetles belonging to the family Elateridae. This genus is endemic to New Zealand.

== Species ==
There are three recognized species:

- Amychus candezei Pascoe, 1876
- Amychus manawatawhi Marris & Johnson, 2010
- Amychus granulatus (Broun, 1883)
