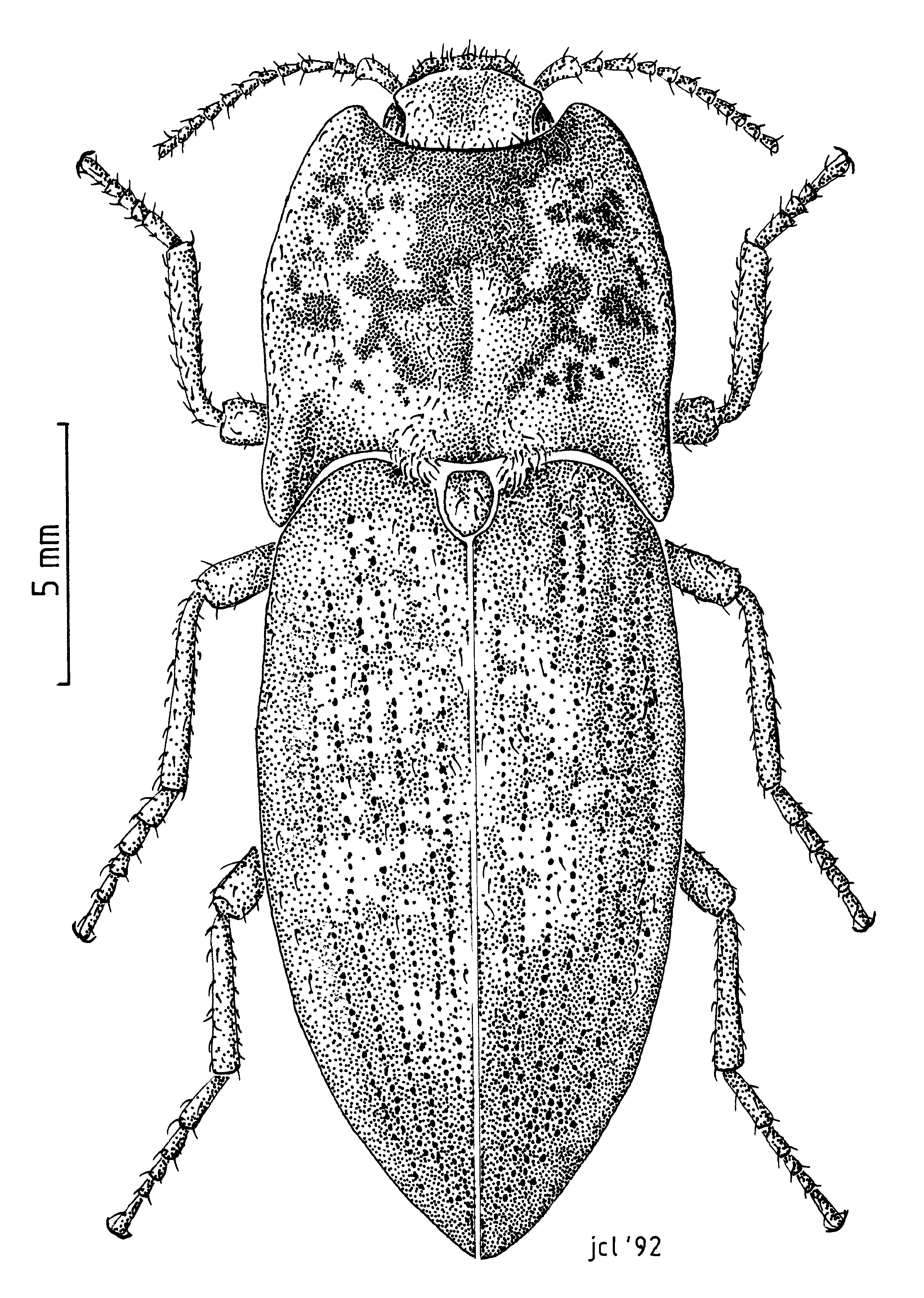
- Amychus manawatawhi by Joanna Liddiard

Conservation status
- Naturally Uncommon (NZ TCS)

Scientific classification
- Kingdom: Animalia
- Phylum: Arthropoda
- Class: Insecta
- Order: Coleoptera
- Suborder: Polyphaga
- Infraorder: Elateriformia
- Family: Elateridae
- Genus: Amychus
- Species: A. manawatawhi

Binomial name
- Amychus manawatawhi Marris and Johnson, 2010

= Amychus manawatawhi =

Three Kings click beetle

Species of beetle

Amychus manawatawhi, commonly known as the Three Kings click beetle, is a large flightless click beetle in the family Elateridae, found only on the Three Kings Islands of New Zealand.

== Taxonomy and etymology ==
This species was described by John Marris and Paul J. Johnson in 2010, based on a specimen collected in 2006 at Lighthouse Bush on Great Island, Three Kings; the holotype was deposited in the Lincoln University Entomology Research Collection.

The name manawatawhi is taken from the Māori name for Great Island, Manawa Tawhi, which translates as "panting breath", referring to the feat of Te Aopuri chief Rauru swimming to the island from the mainland.

== Description ==
Adult A. manawatawhi can be distinguished from other Amychus species by its lack of small nodules on the back, especially on the head and elytra, compared to A. granulatus and A. candezei. It is the largest of the three Amychus species, ranging from 16 to 24 mm. It has a flattened body shape and small vestigial wings. Click beetles are named for their ability to make an audible click when on their back to jump into the air. However, Amychus do not have the ability to defend themselves in this way.

== Gallery ==
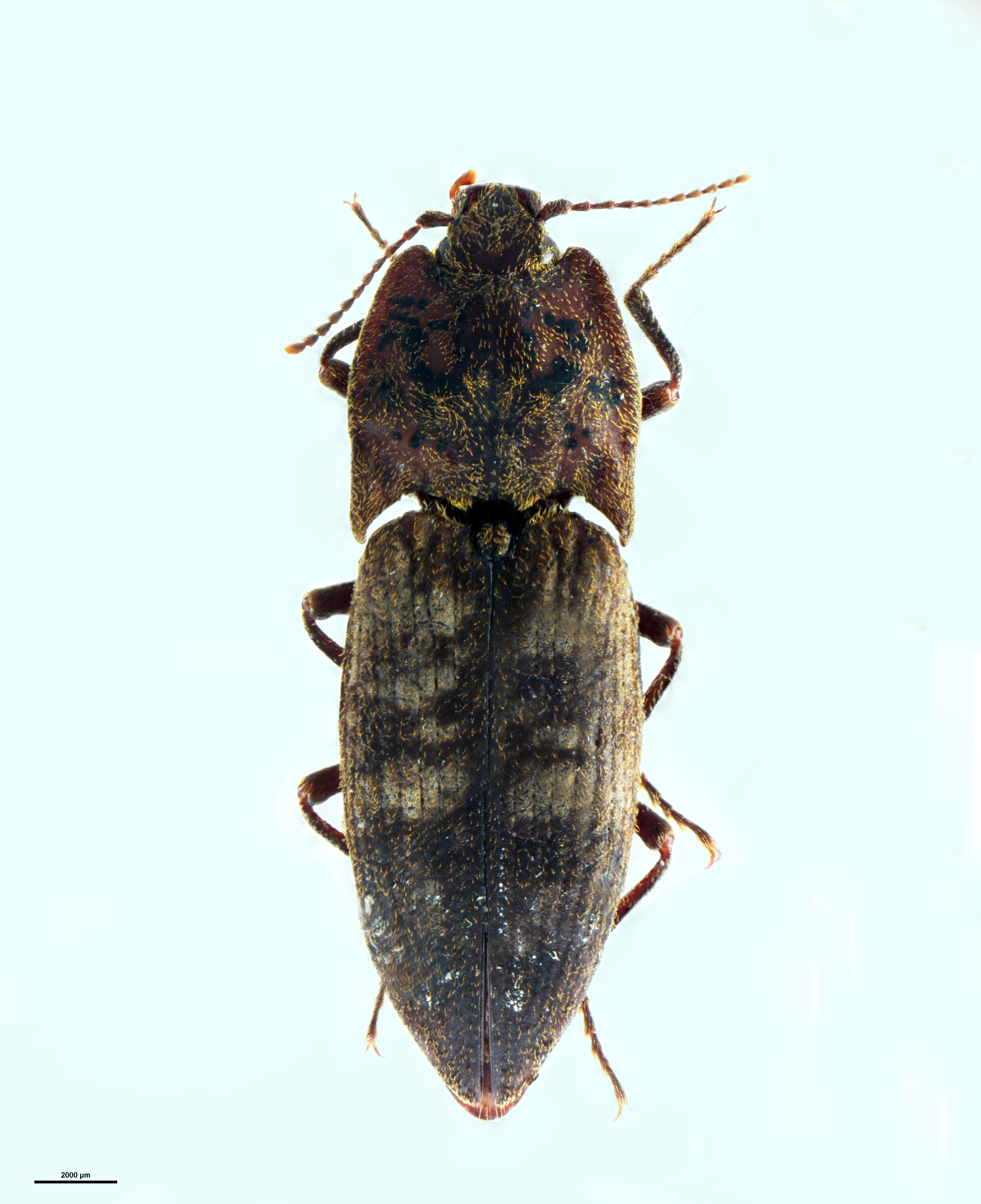
Holotype in Lincoln University Entomology Research Collection

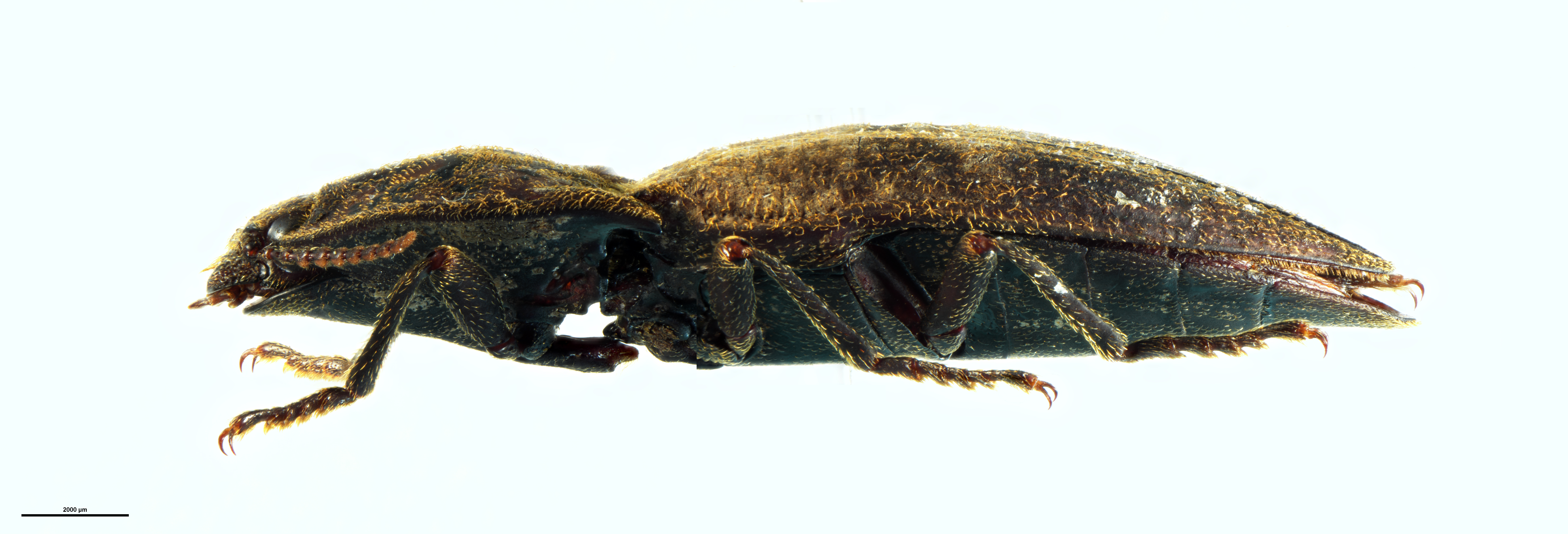
Lateral view

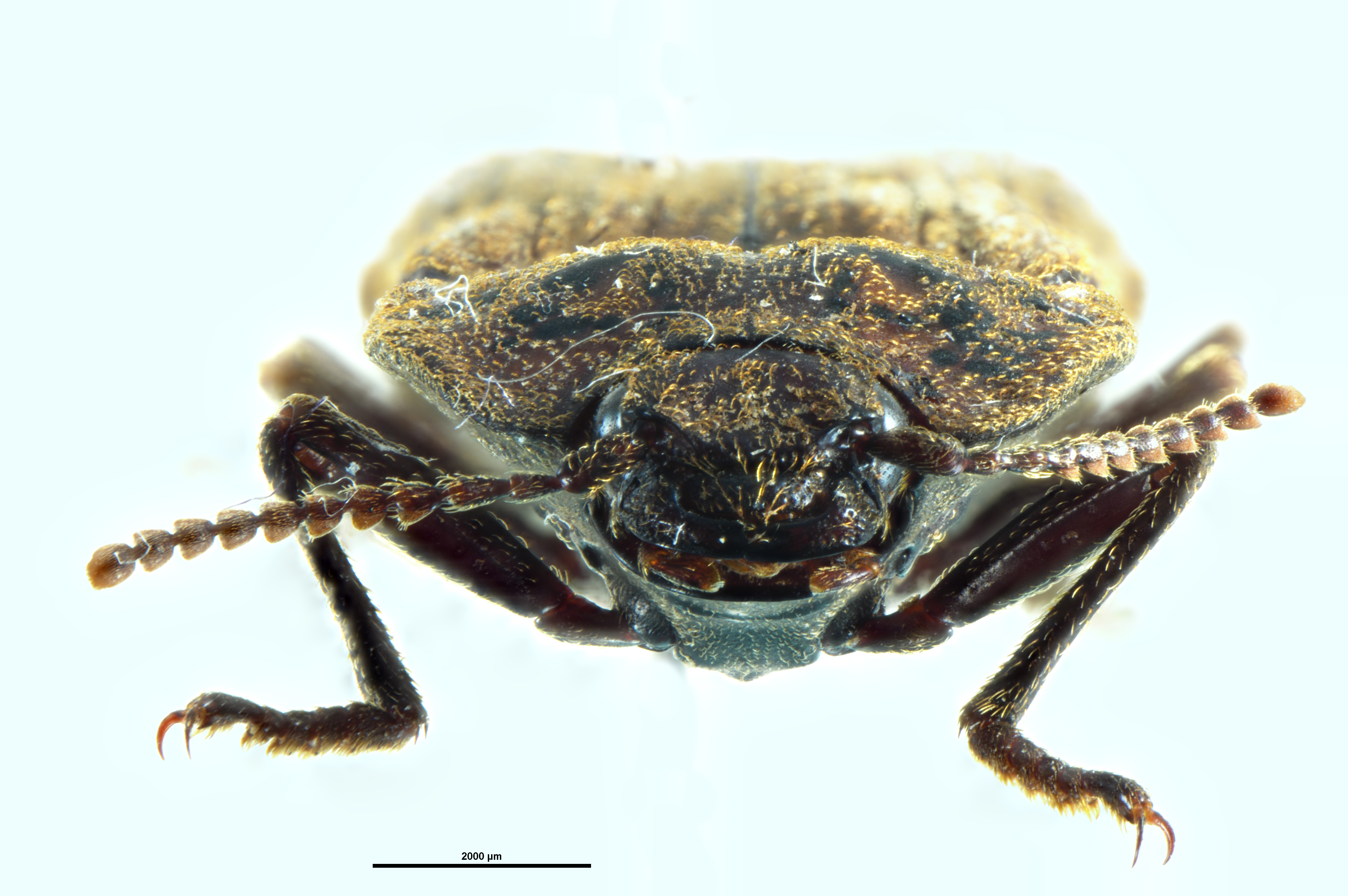
Frontal

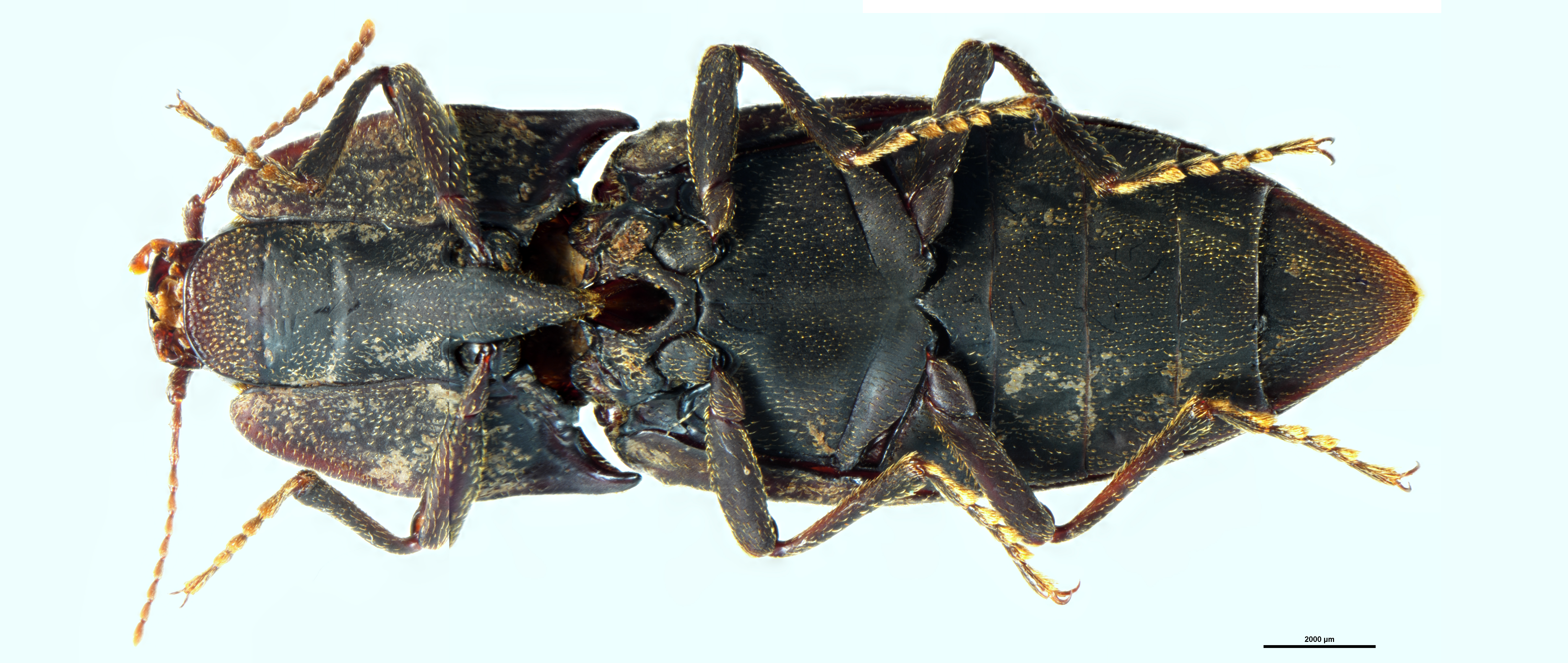
Ventral

== Distribution ==
This species has only been collected from Great Island and South West Island in the Three Kings group. These islands have been isolated from the New Zealand mainland since the late Miocene, and have numerous endemic species; it seems likely that A. manawatawhi evolved on the Three Kings and has always been restricted to those islands.

== Ecology ==
The adult beetle has been collected at night from logs and the trunks of tree species such as Cordyline kaspar, Kunzea sinclairii and Meryta sinclairii, and by day from pitfall traps, litter samples, and under logs and rocks. Only a single larva has been collected, from South West Island.

== Conservation ==
Under the New Zealand Threat Classification System, A. manawatawhi has been classified as "Naturally Uncommon" with the qualifiers of "island endemic" and "range restricted". Goats were introduced to Great Island in 1889, but removed in 1946.
