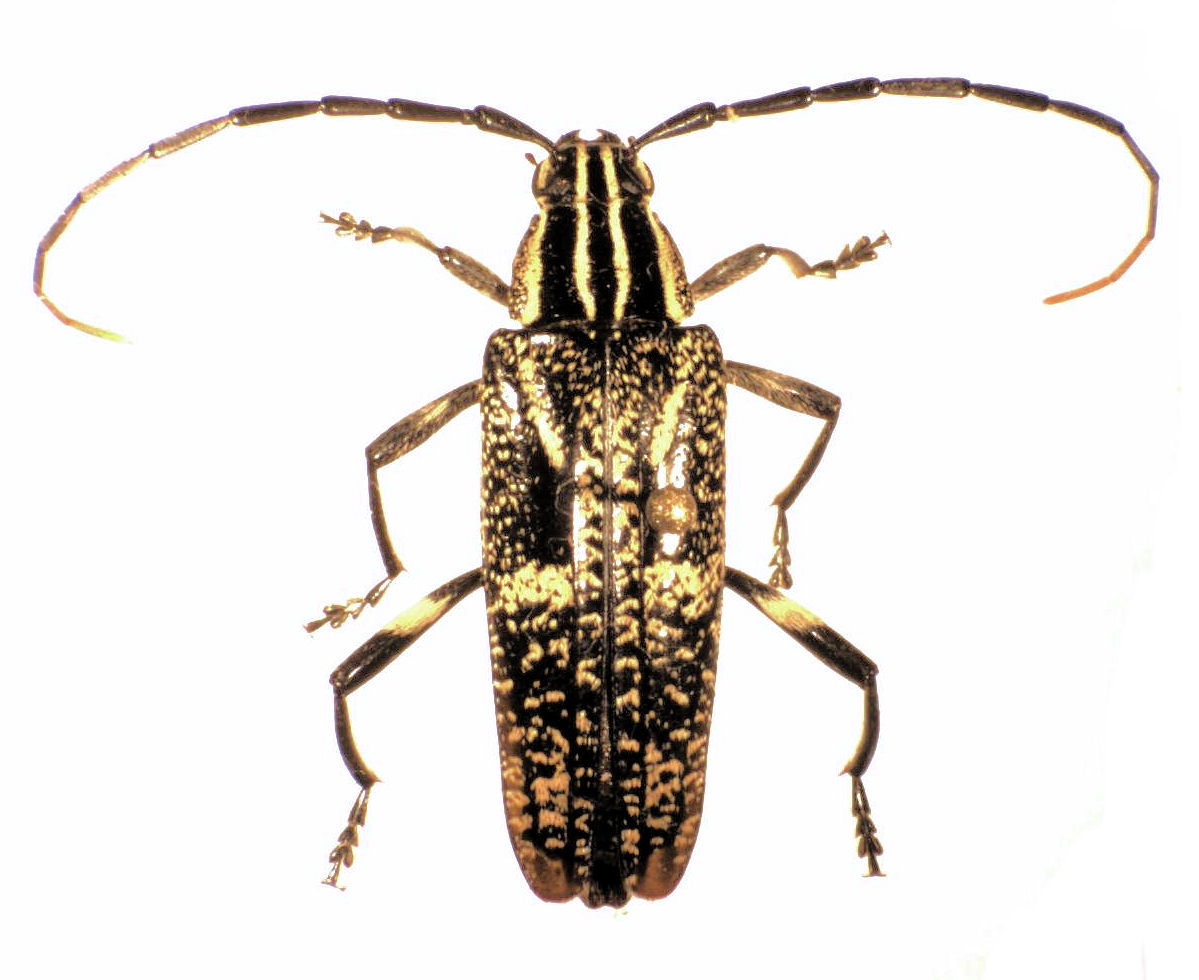
- Coptomma variegatum

Scientific classification
- Domain: Eukaryota
- Kingdom: Animalia
- Phylum: Arthropoda
- Class: Insecta
- Order: Coleoptera
- Suborder: Polyphaga
- Infraorder: Cucujiformia
- Family: Cerambycidae
- Genus: Coptomma; Newman, 1840

= Coptomma =

Genus of beetles

Coptomma is a genus of beetles belonging to the family Cerambycidae. The species of this genus are found in New Zealand.

== Taxonomy ==
The genus was first described in 1840, British entomologist Edward Newman, who chose Coptomma virgatum as the type species for the genus. In 1843, German entomologist Ernst Dieffenbach synonymised Callidium variegatum with Coptomma virgatum, making Coptomma variegatum the type species.

== List of species ==
As of 2021, the list of included species is:

- Coptomma douei (Lucas, 1862)
- Coptomma lineatum (Fabricius, 1775)
- Coptomma marrisi Song & Wang, 2003
- Coptomma sticticum (Broun, 1893)
- Coptomma sulcatum (Fabricius, 1775)
- Coptomma variegatum (Fabricius, 1775)
