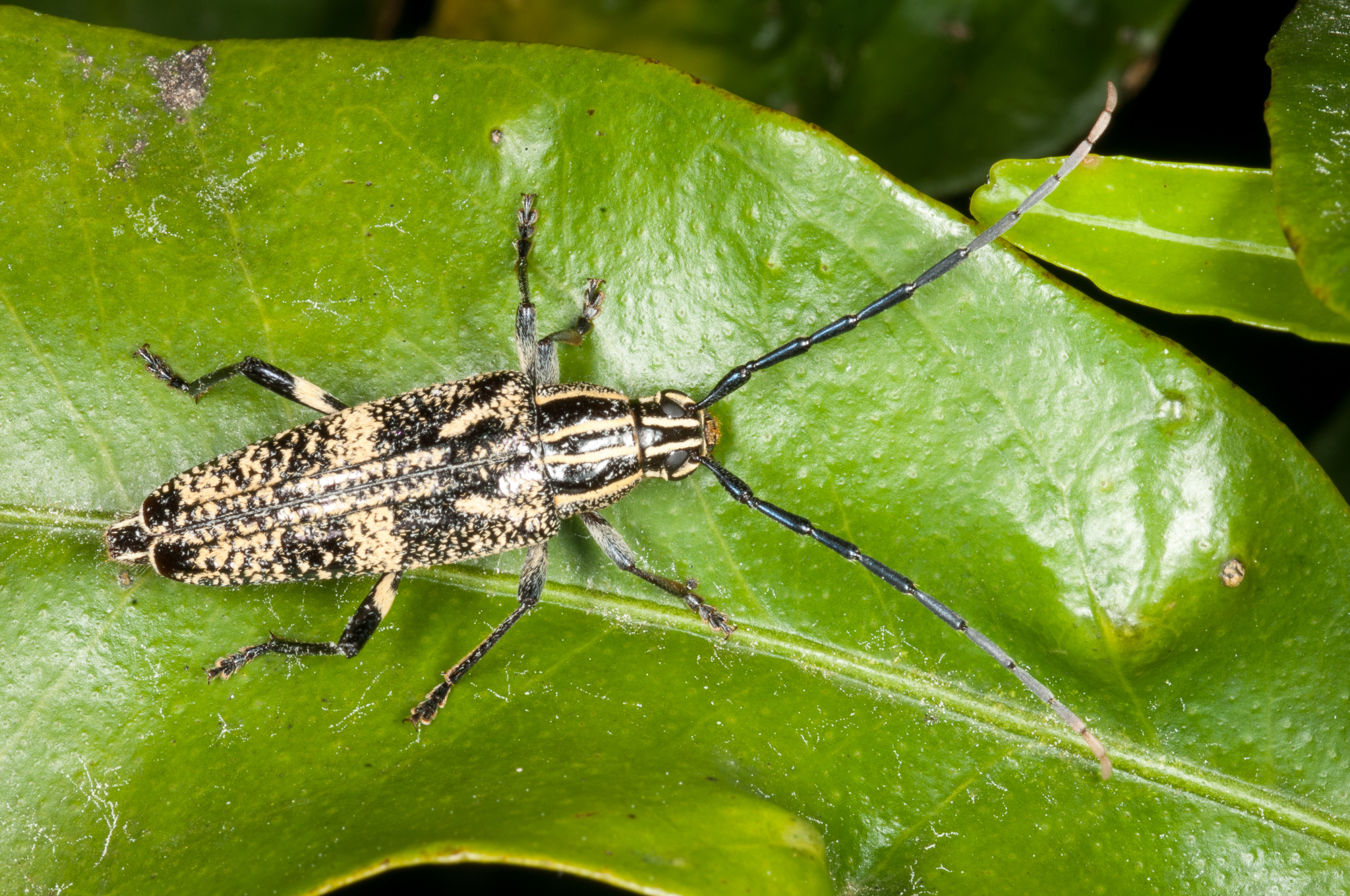

Scientific classification
- Kingdom: Animalia
- Phylum: Arthropoda
- Class: Insecta
- Order: Coleoptera
- Suborder: Polyphaga
- Infraorder: Cucujiformia
- Family: Cerambycidae
- Genus: Coptomma
- Species: C. variegatum

Binomial name
- Coptomma variegatum (Fabricius, 1775)

Synonyms
- Callidium variegatum Fabricius, 1775; Coptomma virgatum Newman, 1840a; Tmesisternus variegatum (Fabricius, 1775); Tmesisternus variegatus (Fabricius, 1775)

= Coptomma variegatum =

Longhorn beetle native to New Zealand

Coptomma variegatum, also known by the names variegated longhorn and tawa longhorn, is a species of longhorn beetle that is endemic to New Zealand.

== Taxonomy ==
The species was one of the first 40 New Zealand insect species to be described, and was collected by naturalists as a part of the Second voyage of James Cook. Upon return to the United Kingdom, the species was described by Johan Christian Fabricius in 1755, who used the name Callidium variegatum. In 1840, British entomologist Edward Newman created the genus Coptomma, describing Coptomma virgatum as the type species for the genus. In 1843, German entomologist Ernst Dieffenbach synonymised Callidium variegatum and Coptomma virgatum, leading to the modern scientific name Coptomma variegatum.

The holotype of the species was deposited in John George Children's collection of beetles in London, but has since been lost. The two original descriptions by Fabricius and Newman identified the species as being a native of Australia, which was incorrect.

== Description ==
The species can grow up to 22 mm (0.87 in) in length. Coptomma variegatum is visually similar to the genus Navomorpha, but can be identified by the pronotum of Coptomma variegatum being wider than it is long, the angle of the head between the frons and vertex being greater than 100°, and the absence of an overhanging mesosternal process in Coptomma variegatum.

== Habitat and distribution ==
This species is primarily found in forested areas of New Zealand in both the North Island and South Island. The larvae are typically found in dead trees. Known host species of the beetle include Beilschmiedia tawa, Sophora microphylla and Sophora tetraptera, as well as introduced species, including Acacia dealbata, Acacia decurrens, Acacia mearnsii, Castanea sativa (sweet chestnut) and Paraserianthes lophantha.

Adults of the species are typically found flying between November and April in New Zealand.

== Gallery ==
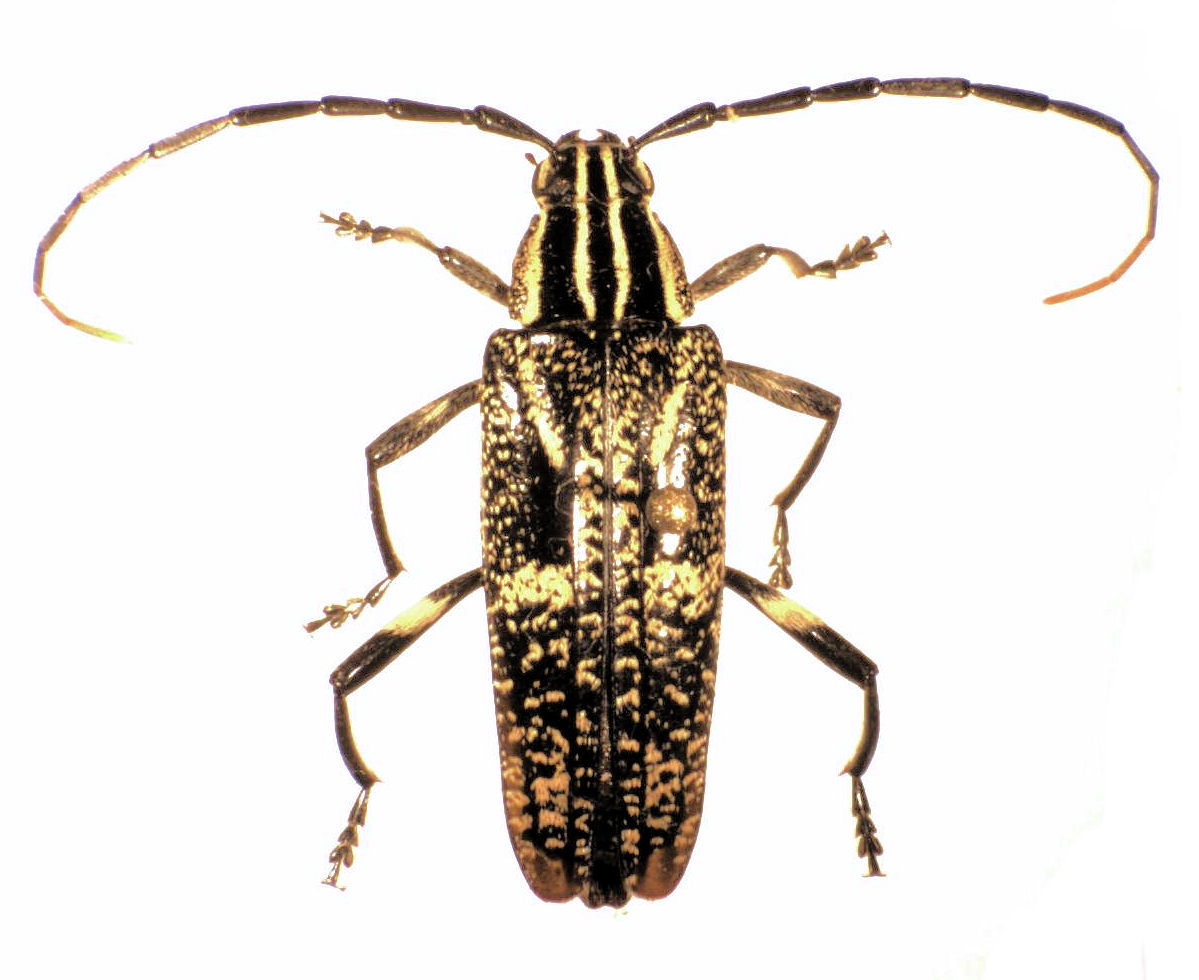
Specimen image of Coptomma variegatum

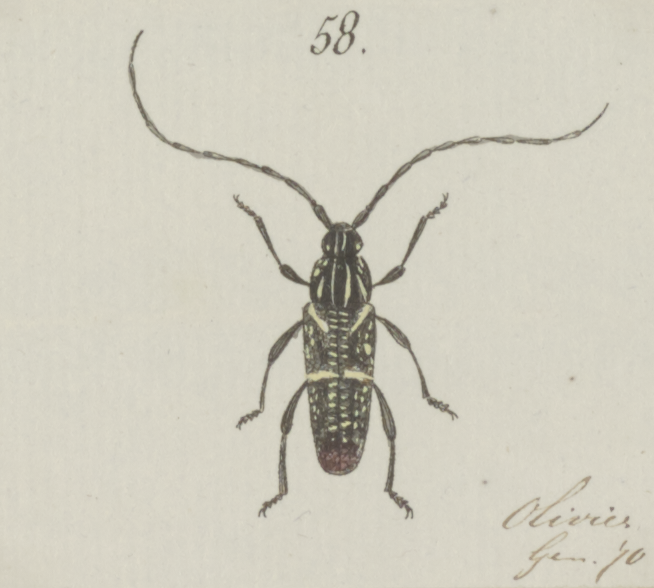
Illustration of Coptomma variegatum from the Iconographia Zoologica

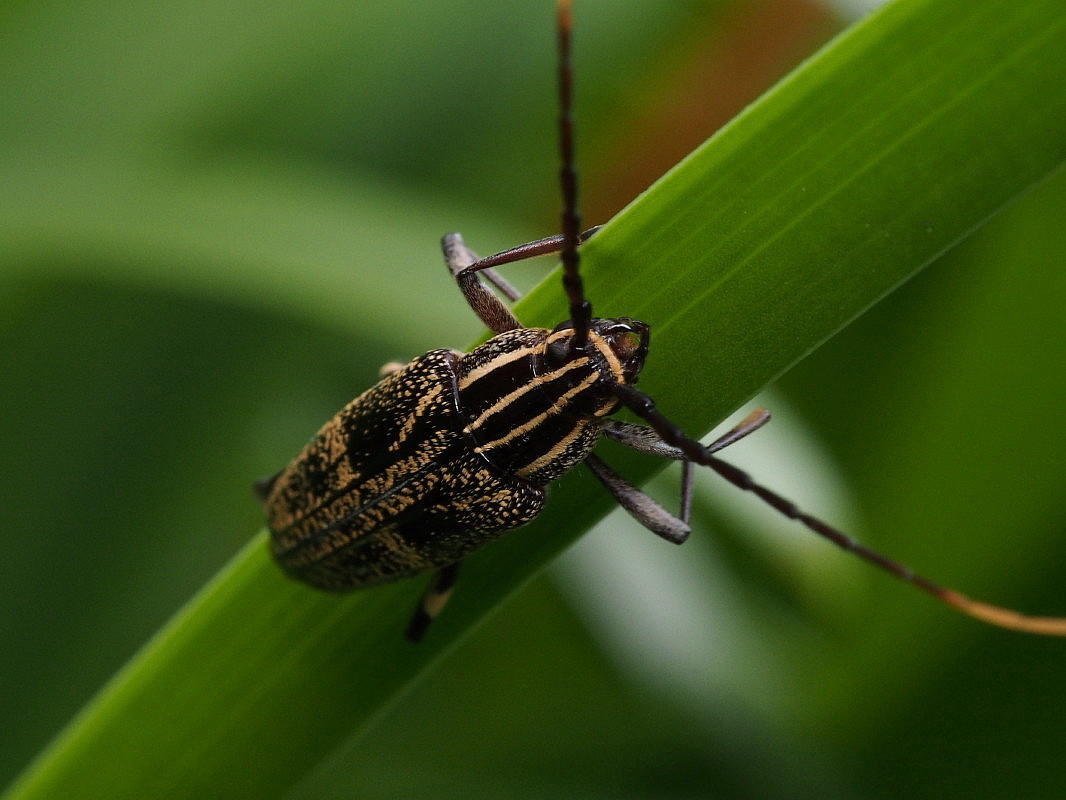
Coptomma variegatum seen in the Far North District

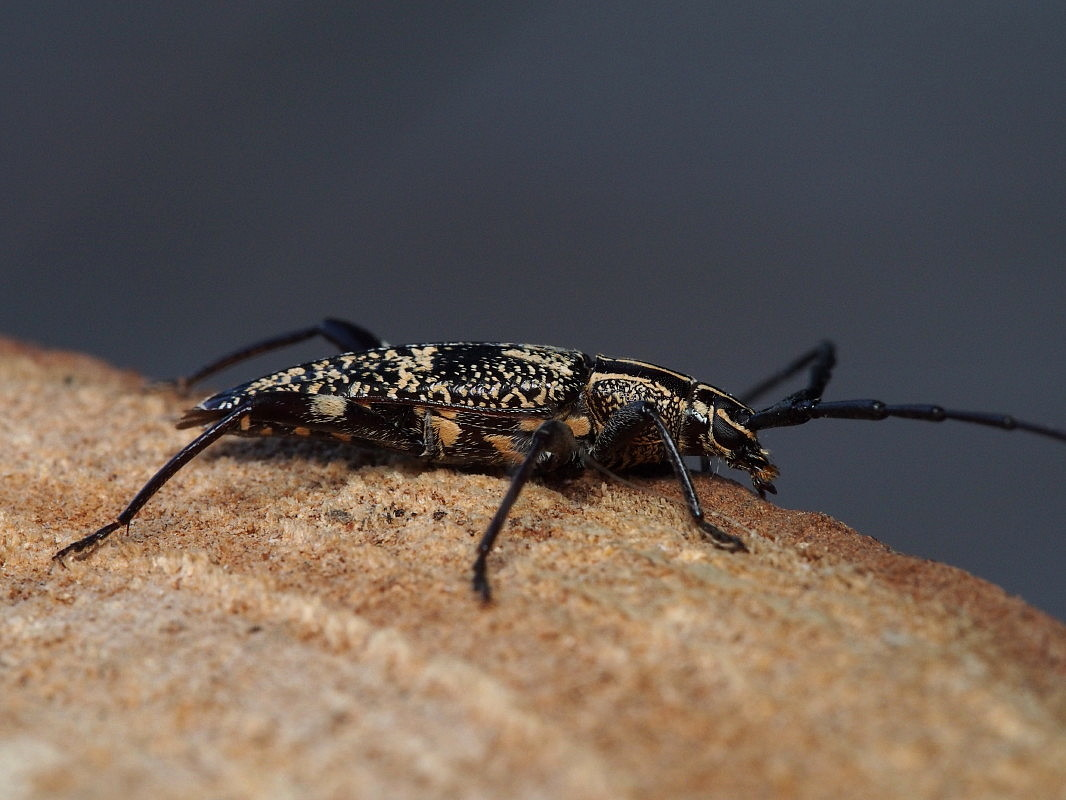
Side view of Coptomma variegatum

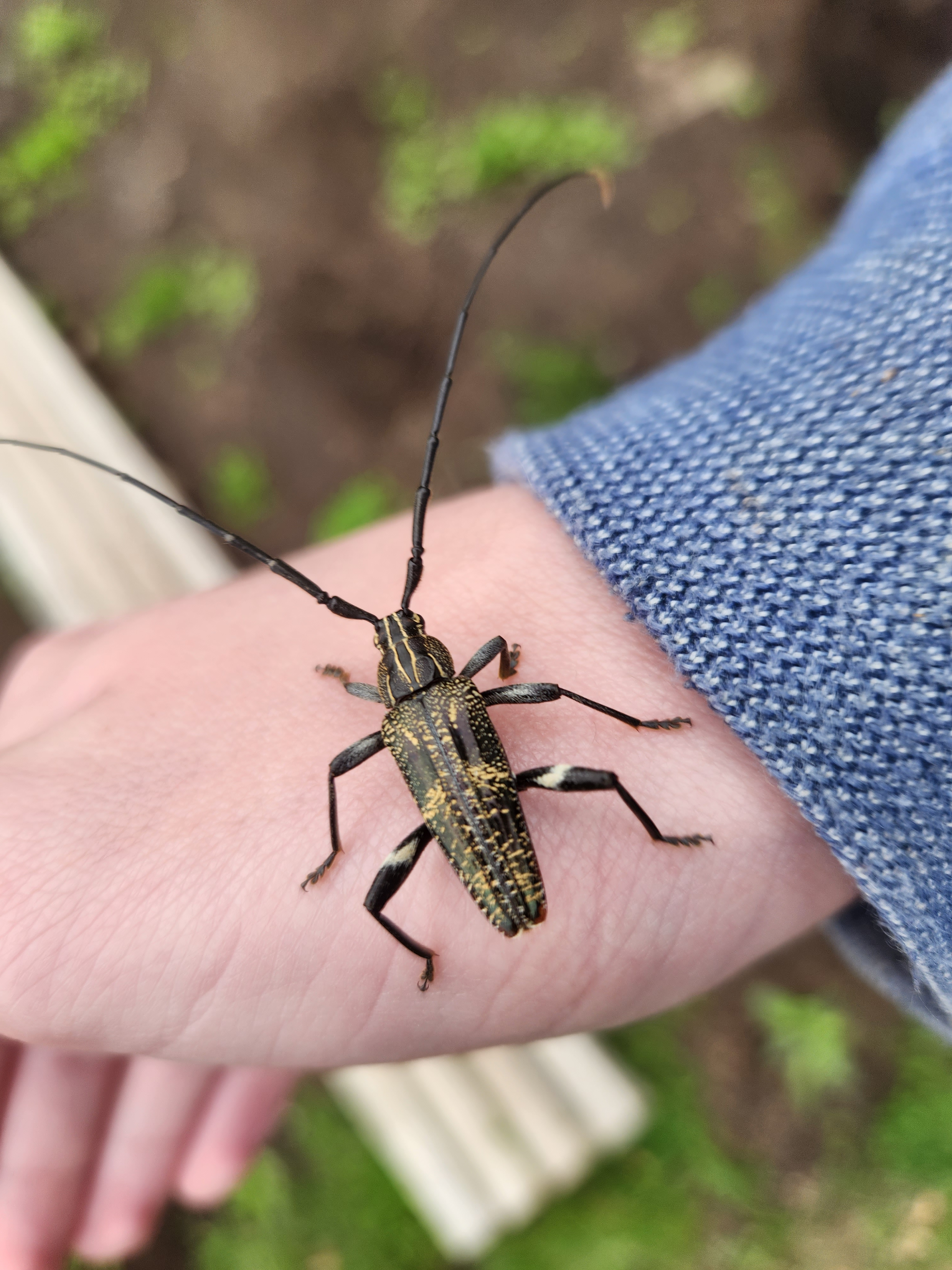
Coptomma variegatum perched on a hand

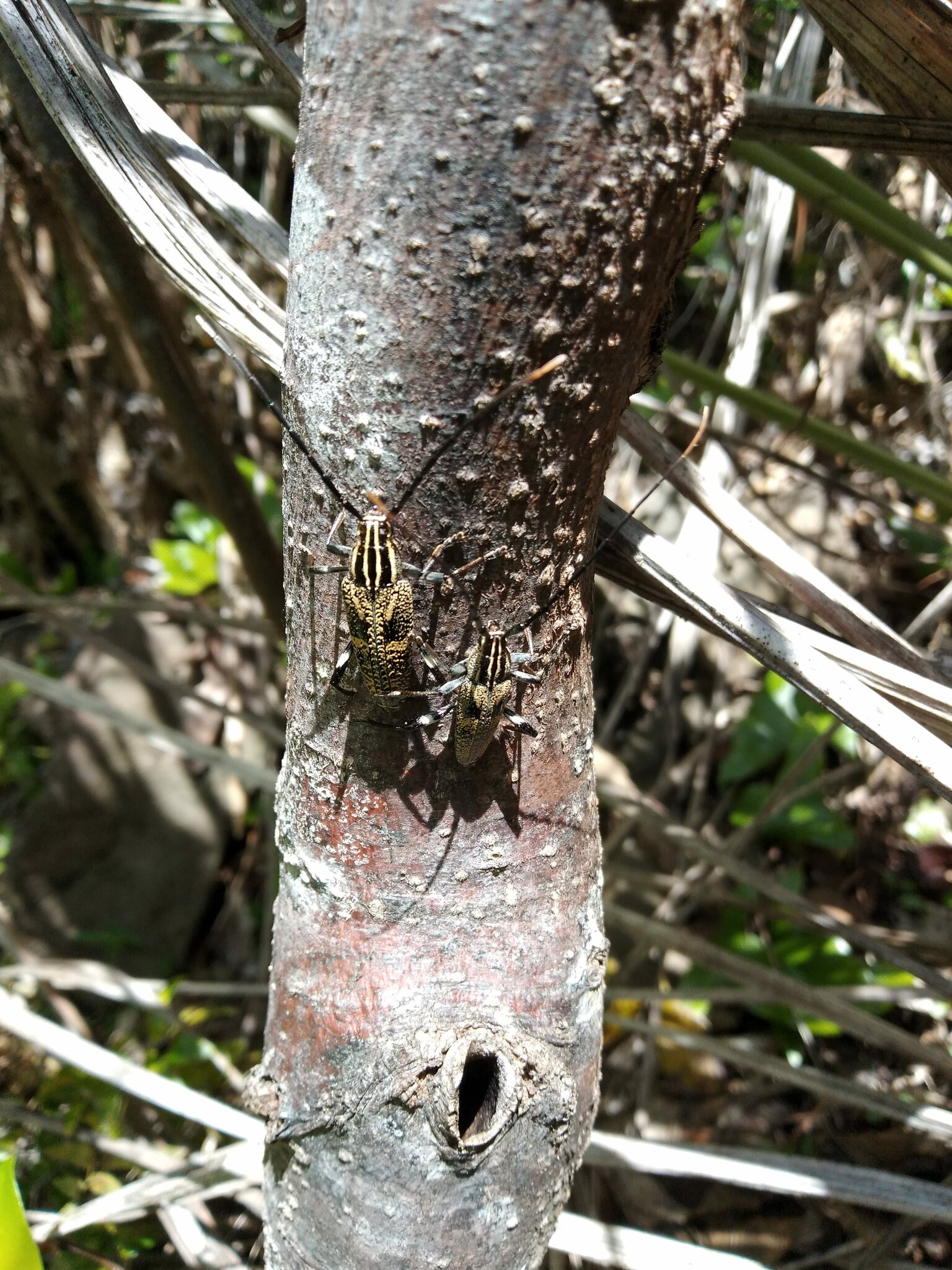
Two Coptomma variegatum on a tree trunk on Waiheke Island
