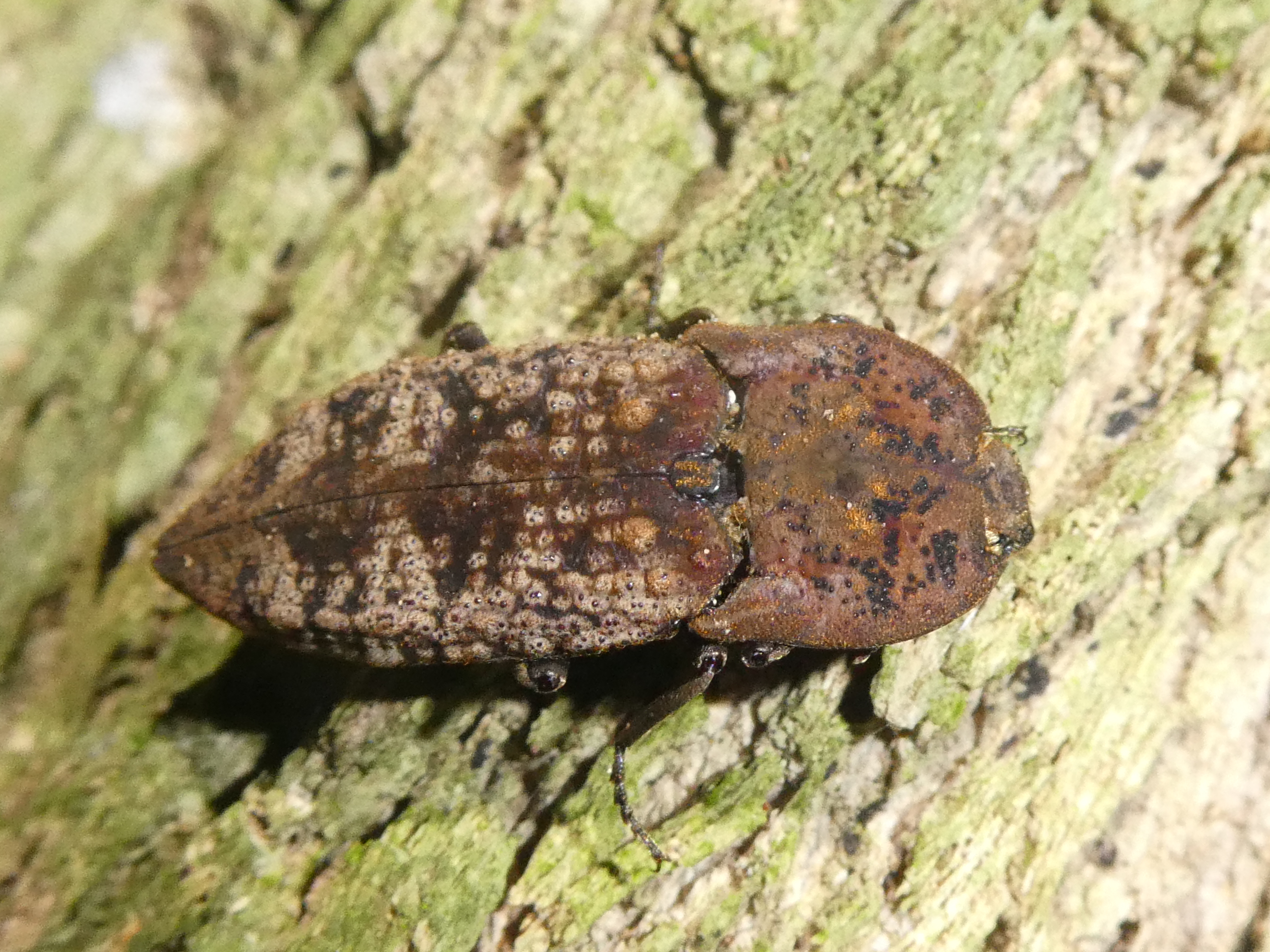
- A Cook Strait click beetle on Maud Island

Conservation status
- Relict (NZ TCS)

Scientific classification
- Kingdom: Animalia
- Phylum: Arthropoda
- Clade: Pancrustacea
- Class: Insecta
- Order: Coleoptera
- Suborder: Polyphaga
- Infraorder: Elateriformia
- Family: Elateridae
- Genus: Amychus
- Species: A. granulatus

Binomial name
- Amychus granulatus Broun, 1883

Synonyms
- Psorochroa granulata (Emberson et al. 1993); Amychus stephensiensis (Marris 1996b)

= Amychus granulatus =

Cook Strait click beetle

Species of beetle

Amychus granulatus, commonly known as the Cook Strait click beetle, is a large flightless click beetle in the family Elateridae.

== Description ==
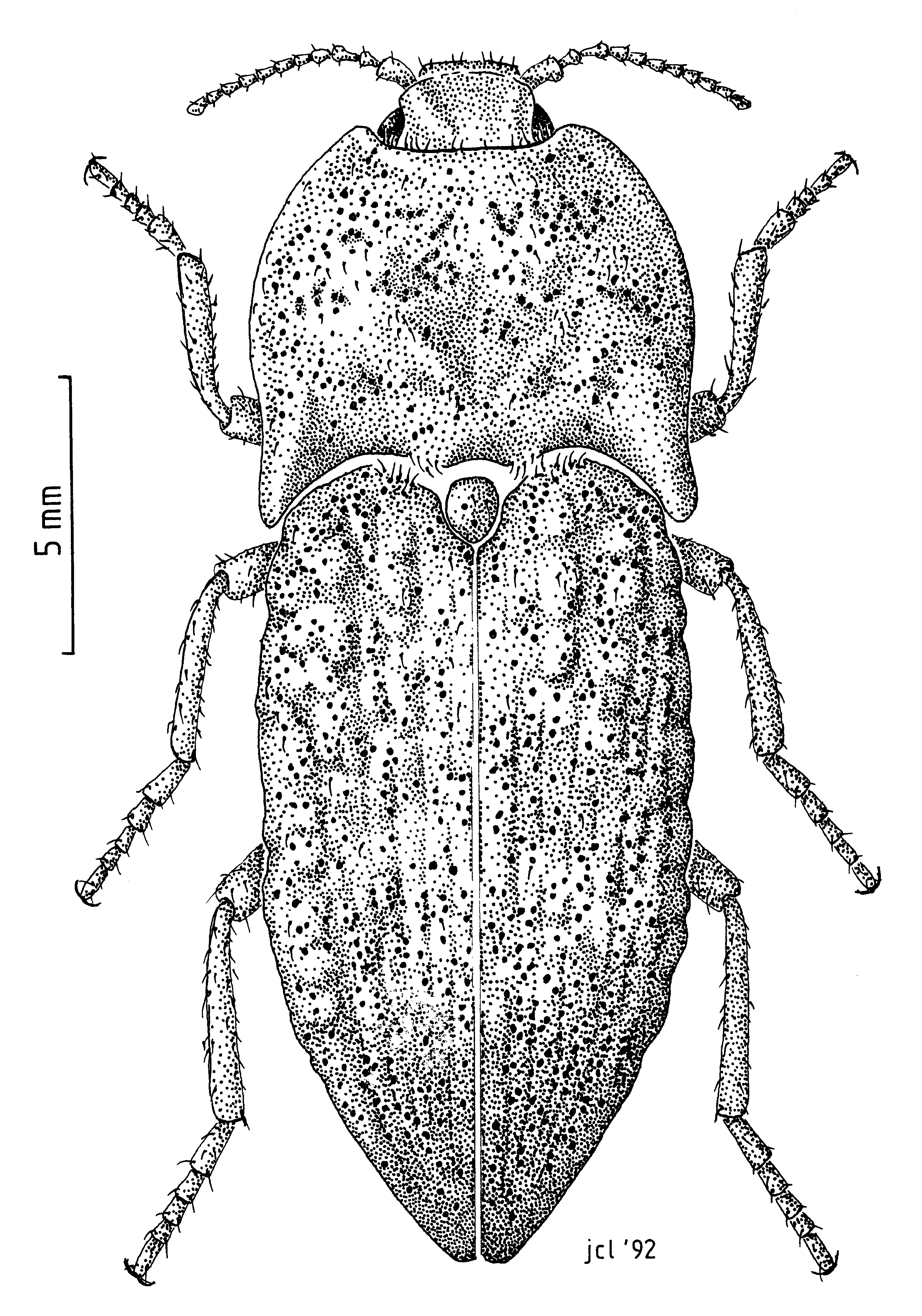
Amychus granulatus by Joanna Liddiard

Adult A. granulatus can be distinguished from other Amychus species by its wide and spreading prothorax and small round nodules on its elytra. Its size ranges from 16 to 22.5 mm. It has a flattened body shape and small vestigial wings. Click beetles are named due to their ability to make an audible click when on their back to jump into the air. However, Amychus do not have the ability to defend themselves in this way.

== Distribution ==
This species was discovered by the lighthouse keeper Andreas Sandager on North Brother Island in Cook Strait, and was described by Broun in 1881. It is currently only found on islands in the outer Marlborough Sounds in New Zealand; fragments of this beetle have been collected from the nest of the extinct Laughing owl in North Canterbury, indicating it once had a much larger former range. Islands that it has been collected from include the Brothers, Stephens Island, Middle and South Trio Island, Maud Island and Sentinel Rock. It has not been seen since 1957 on North Brother Island (its type locality) despite searches, and it is possible that it is now extinct there. The relict populations on Marlborough Sounds islands are probably due to the introduction of mammalian predators on the mainland.

== Ecology ==
The adult beetle has been collected from tree trunks including tawa, ngaio and taupata at night, and from under logs and rocks. Adult beetles have been observed feeding on sap oozing from tree trunks.

== Threats ==
The presence of five separate populations of the beetle on islands in the Outer Marlborough Sounds probably helps protect it against any immediate threat to its survival. However, some of these populations are in decline. In 1930, G.V. Hudson described the Cook Strait click beetle as "confined to the islands in Cook Strait, where it is abundant in crevices in the rocks and under logs and stones". Recent accounts describe it as now rare, despite little change in the vegetation over the past fifty years. A recent increase in the number of predatory tuatara may account for this. However tuatara scats, despite containing a rich range of invertebrate fauna, were not shown to contain the Cook Strait click beetle. It is thought that the lack of decomposing logs on Stephens Island may limit the population size there.

== Conservation ==
Since 1980 A. granulatus has been protected under the Wildlife Act 1953, making it illegal to collect or own specimens without a permit. Its conservation status is considered to be Relict and Conservation Dependent, as it only survives on islands that are maintained as rodent-free. Future conservation efforts, including any captive breeding programme, are impeded by the lack of knowledge of its basic biology, particularly the biology of its larvae. Providing artificial habitat to replace the lack of decomposing logs may assist this species and help with population monitoring.
