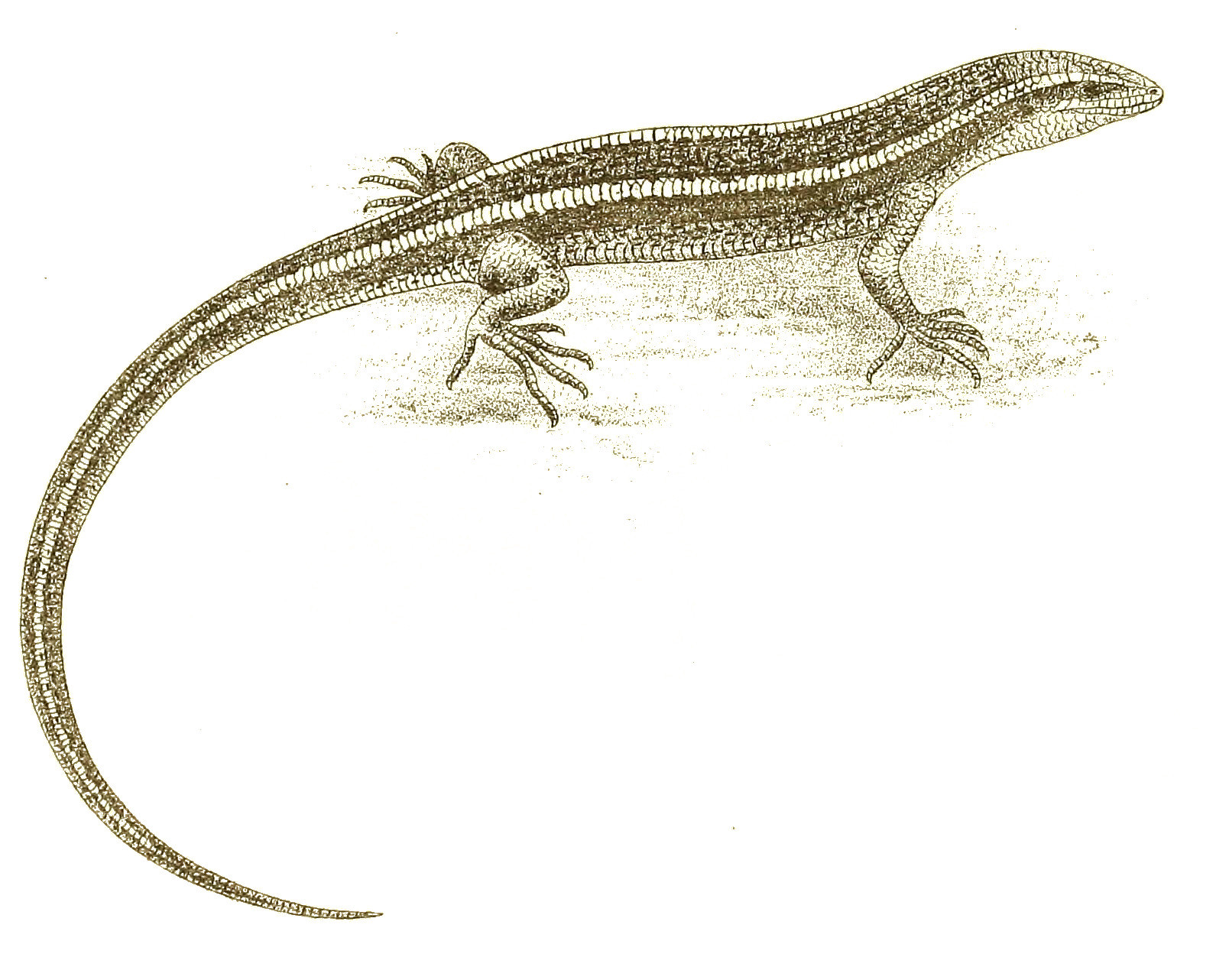

Conservation status
- Vulnerable (IUCN 2.3)

Scientific classification
- Kingdom: Animalia
- Phylum: Chordata
- Class: Reptilia
- Order: Squamata
- Family: Scincidae
- Genus: Oligosoma
- Species: O. striatum

Binomial name
- Oligosoma striatum (Buller, 1871)
- Distribution of the New Zealand striped skink in the North Island Known native range

= New Zealand striped skink =

Species of lizard

The New Zealand striped skink (Oligosoma striatum) is a rare species of medium-sized skink endemic to New Zealand. Found in the North Island, Great Barrier Island and Little Barrier Island, the species is primarily arboreal, living in dense native tree canopies.

== Taxonomy ==
The species was first described in 1871 by Walter Buller under the name Mocoa striata. In 1955 when Charles McCann revised the taxa of New Zealand skinks, he placed the species within the genus Leiolopisma, which made the species' scientific name Leiolopisma striatum for much of the 20th century. This was until 1995 when Geoff Patterson and Charles Daugherty reinstated the genus Oligosoma for New Zealand skinks, leading to the species' modern name Oligosoma striatum. The specific epithet means "streaked".

In 1955, Charles McCann described the species Leiolopisma latilinearum, which was synonymised with the New Zealand striped skink in 1977.

== Description ==
The species has a pointed snout, and a snout–vent length of 76 mm (3.0 in). The species is dark brown in colour, with two pale cream stripes along the length of their bodies.

== Distribution and habitat ==
The New Zealand striped skink's range includes much of the North Island of New Zealand, ranging from southern Northland Region to the Taranaki Region. It is also present on both Great Barrier Island and Little Barrier Island in the Hauraki Gulf. The population on Great Barrier Island represents 50% of all known records of the species from between 1992 and 2022.

The species typically lives in dense native forest, especially forests dominated by Beilschmiedia tawa. They are often found under fallen rotting logs in the bush or under those remaining in pasture after the forest has been cleared. They are at least partly arboreal and have been found in the forest canopy among epiphytes and also in standing dead trees.

== Behaviour ==
The New Zealand striped skink is diurnal and arboreal, often found sun-basking at high points on trees. The species typically gives birth to between 3-8 skinks between February and March.

The species often lives in colonies of between 30–40 individuals, and its diet primarily consists of insects.

== Conservation status ==
In 2012 the Department of Conservation classified the striped skink as At Risk under the New Zealand Threat Classification System. It was judged as meeting the criteria for At Risk threat status as a result of it having a low to high ongoing or predicted decline. This skink is also regarded as being Data Poor, Sparse and Conservation Dependent. The species is considered Regionally Declining in the Auckland Region, with Great Barrier Island identified as a significant location of importance for the species.
