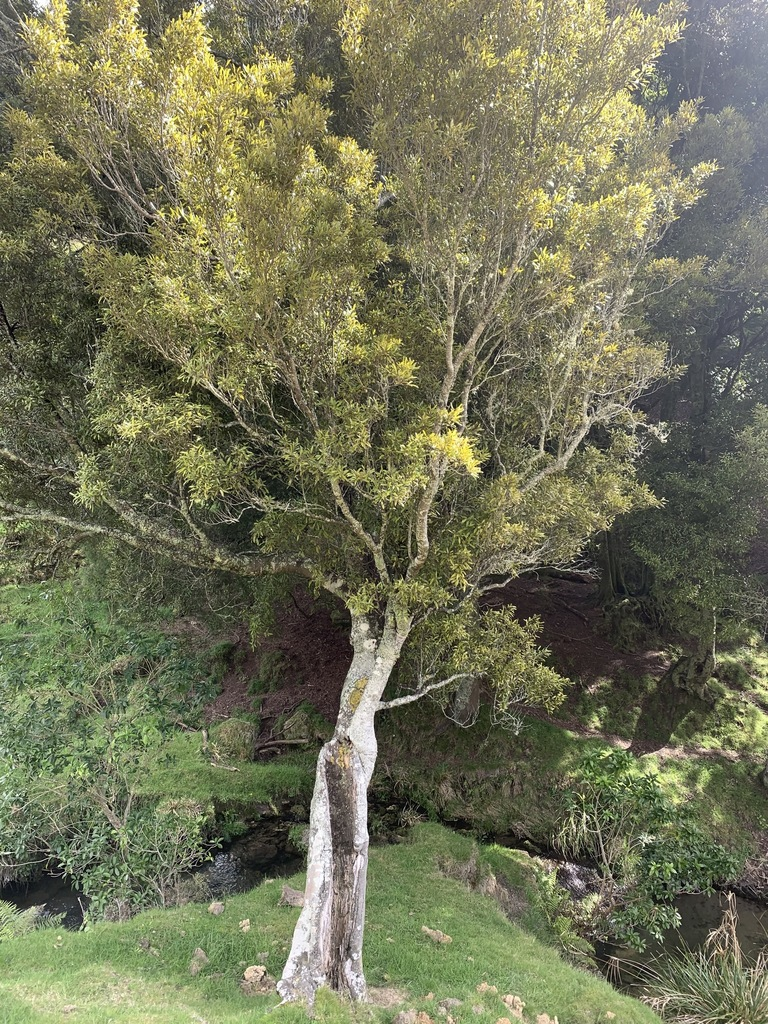
- A tawa tree near Tangoio, New Zealand

Conservation status
- Least Concern (IUCN 3.1)

Scientific classification
- Kingdom: Plantae
- Clade: Tracheophytes
- Clade: Angiosperms
- Clade: Magnoliids
- Order: Laurales
- Family: Lauraceae
- Genus: Beilschmiedia
- Species: B. tawa

Binomial name
- Beilschmiedia tawa (A.Cunn.) Kirk

Synonyms
- Beilschmiedia tawaroa Wright; Nesodaphne tawa (A.Cunn.) Hook.; Laurus tawa A.Cunn.; Laurus salicifolia Banks & Sol. ex A.Cunn.; Laurus victoriana Colensoex Hook.

= Beilschmiedia tawa =

Species of tree endemic to New Zealand

Beilschmiedia tawa, commonly known as the Māori name tawa, is a New Zealand broadleaf tree common in the central parts of the country. Tawa is often the dominant canopy tree species in lowland forests in the North Island and the north east of the South Island, but will also often form the subcanopy in primary forests throughout the country in these areas, beneath podocarps such as kahikatea, mataī, miro and rimu. Individual specimens may grow up to 30 m (98 ft) or more in height, with trunks up to 1.2 m (3 ft 11 in) in diameter, and they have smooth dark bark.

Tawa produce small inconspicuous flowers followed by 2–3.5 cm (0.79–1.38 in) long fruit of a dark red plum colour. With such large fruits, tawa is notable for the fact that it relies solely on the New Zealand pigeon (kererū) and (where present) the North Island kōkako for dispersal of its seed. These are the only remaining birds from New Zealand's original biota large enough to eat the fruits of this tree and pass the seeds through their guts and excrete them unharmed. Tawa can also support significant epiphyte gardens in their canopies, which are one of the few habitats known to be frequented by the enigmatic, arboreal striped skink.

This tree gives its name to a northern suburb of Wellington, Tawa.

== Description ==
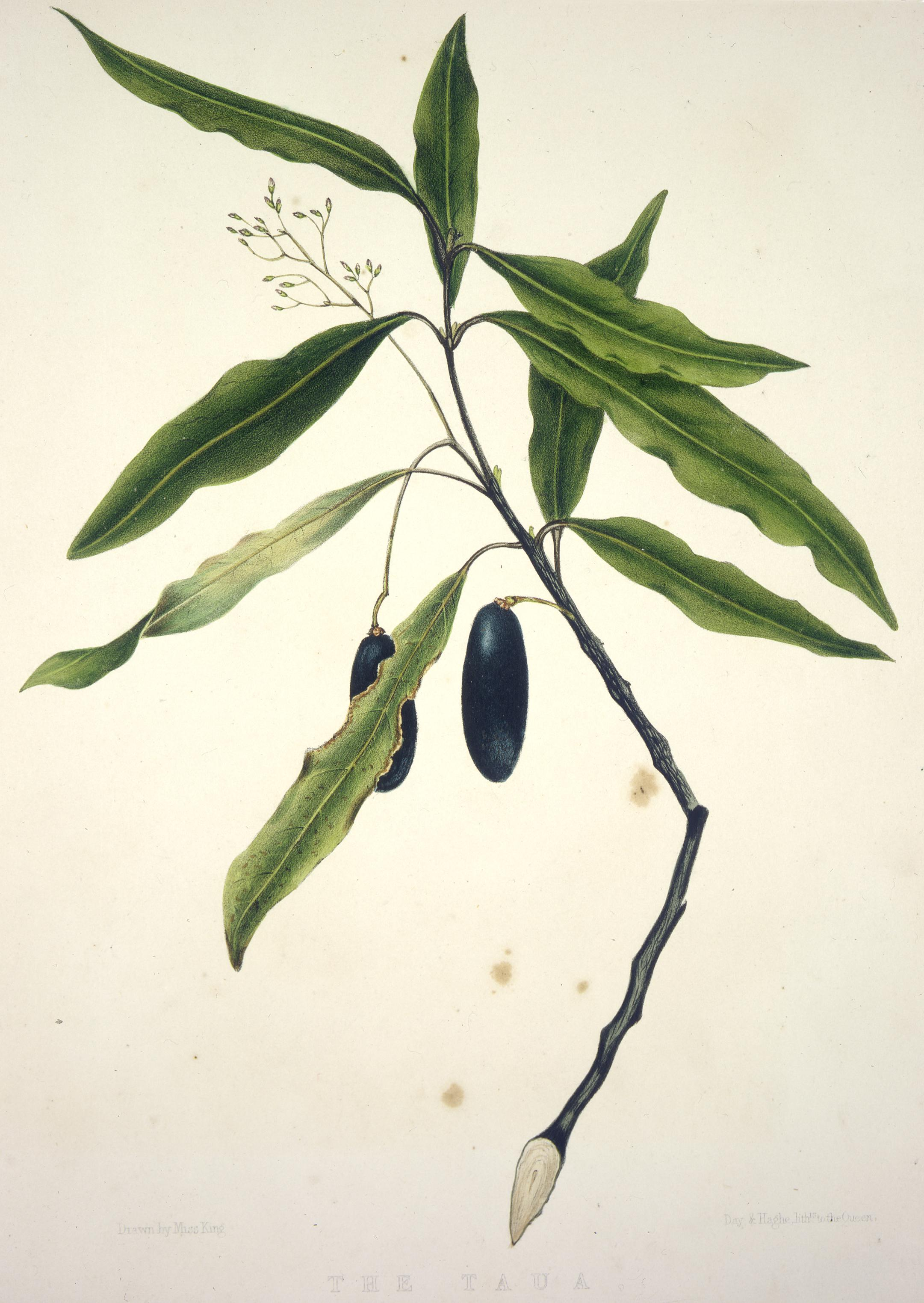
1842 botanical illustration by Martha King

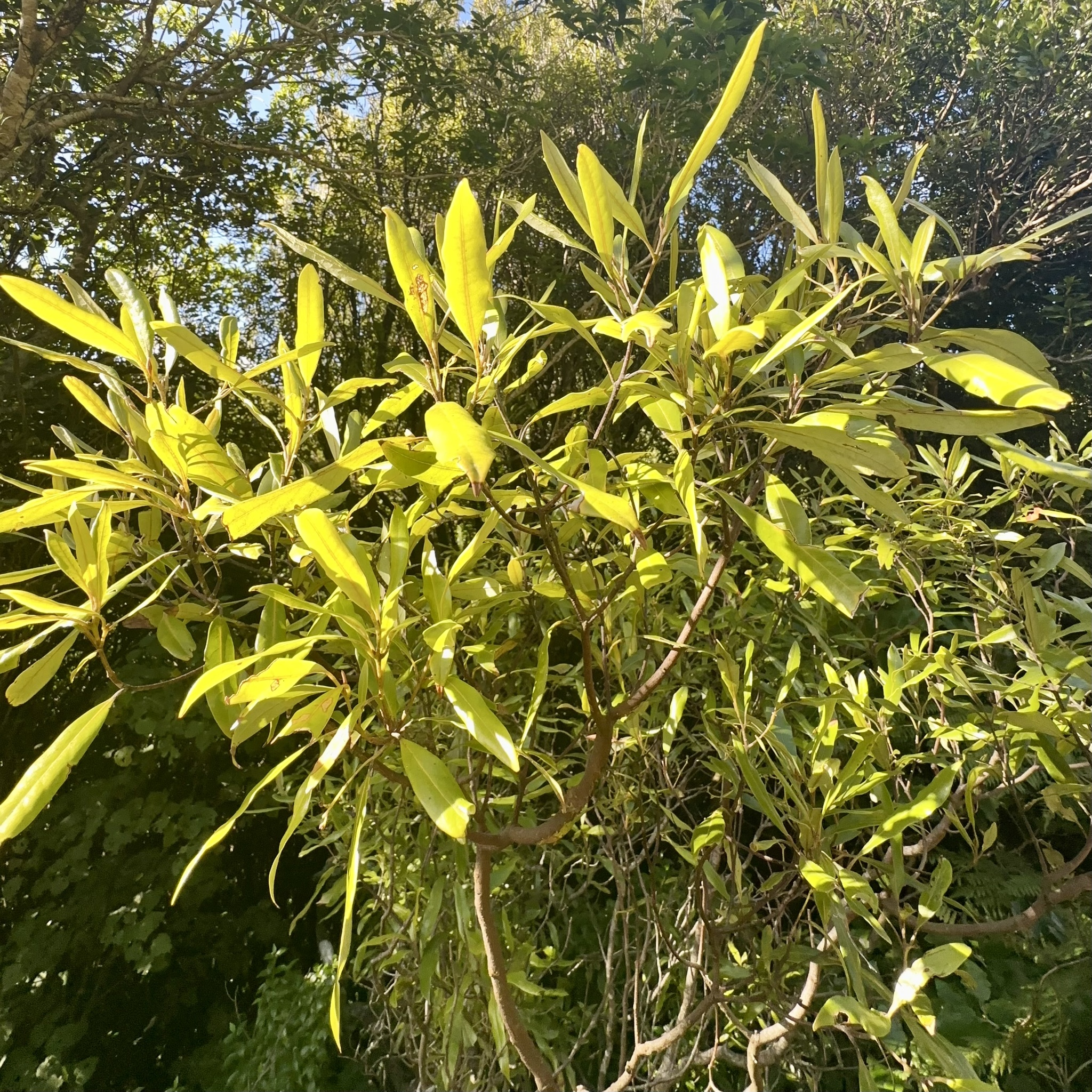
Leaves of Beilschmiedia tawa

Beilschmiedia tawa, or tawa, is a medium-sized evergreen tree in the family Lauraceae endemic to New Zealand. It grows to a height of up to 25–35 m (82–115 ft) tall and has a trunk up to 1 m (3 ft 3 in) in diameter.

Flowering typically occurs in January, but can occur as early as October or as late as May, producing an inflorescence (flower spike) up to 100 mm (3.9 in) long. Its flowers are 2–4 mm (0.079–0.157 in) in diameter and palish green. Fruiting typically occurs in January, but can come as early as December or as late as March. The fruit is an oval shaped drupe typically measuring 30 mm (1.2 in) long and 12 mm (0.47 in) wide, potentially 20–38 mm (0.79–1.50 in) long and 9–18 mm (0.35–0.71 in) wide. The fruit is contains a single seed surrounded by a fleshy pericarp. The pericarp can be glaucous (covered in a pale waxy coating) or shiny and turns dark purple when ripe.

Beilschmiedia tawa has slender to moderately robust erecting branches. Its leaves are lanceolate, typically measuring 40–80 mm (1.6–3.1 in) in length (rarely 30–95 mm (1.2–3.7 in)) and 11–16 mm (0.43–0.63 in) wide (rarely 8–40 mm (0.31–1.57 in)). Their color ranges from yellowish to green. They are glabrous (hairless) with a pale glaucous underside. Its petioles are typically 8 mm (0.31 in) long, ranging from 6–12 mm (0.24–0.47 in) in length.

== Taxonomy and etymology ==
The species was first labelled as Laurus salicifolia in the notes of Joseph Banks and Daniel Solander dating from 1769, referring to material collected during the First voyage of James Cook. The species was first formally described in 1838 by Allan Cunningham, who named the species Laurus tawa. In 1853, the species was moved to the genus Nesodaphne by Joseph Dalton Hooker in the series Flora Novae-Zelandiae. The genus was combined into Beilschmiedia by George Bentham and Hooker in 1880. The current scientific name Beilschmiedia tawa uses the 1889 description by Thomas Kirk in the periodical Forest Flora of New Zealand as the authority. Its epithet tawa is also its Māori name directly descended from Proto-Polynesian term *tawa cognate to the "tava" in sister languages referring to Pometia pinnata known in tropical Polynesia. P. pinnata, while not being a closely related species, shares some similarities including being a prominent tall forest tree, and having buttress roots.

In 1984, botanist Anthony Ernest Wright described a new species called Beilschmiedia tawaroa after noticing differences in trees grown in the islands of the Hauraki Gulf, which had larger, dark green elliptic leaves. This species was synonymised with Beilschmiedia tawa by Peter de Lange and Ewen Cameron in 1999, who failed to find any other consistent distinguishing features.

== Distribution ==
Beilschmiedia tawa is a tree endemic to New Zealand. It is most commonly found in the North Island, and on many of its off-shore islands. In the South Island, the tree is less common with its population being mainly centred in the Marlborough Region, with its southernmost population located in the Kaikōura Ranges, in the northern Canterbury Region. It is one of two members of the genus Beilschmiedia found in New Zealand, alongside Beilschmiedia tarairi, also known as taraire.

Beilschmiedia tawa is only naturally absent in the highest regions of the Central Volcanic Plateau, the montane forests, and locally unfavourable locations in the lowland woods of the North Island. Additionally, secondary forests caused by fire are unusual for it. The Aupōuri Peninsula's sand-dune terrain and the beaches of Kaipara and Manawatū are the only places in the country where there are gaps due to the lack of native forest lowland distribution. Between the Mōkau and Whanganui Rivers and in the hilly terrain of the eastern Bay of Plenty hinterland hold the largest populations of B. tawa.

In the South Island, Beilschmiedia tawa is largely present in the seawards valleys near of the Marlborough Region, but is it uncommon inland. Its most westerly known occurrence in the South Island is in the Tākaka Valley, north-west of the Nelson Region. The Kaikōura Ranges in the Canterbury region are the southernmost geographical location where B. tawa naturally occur.

== Habitat ==
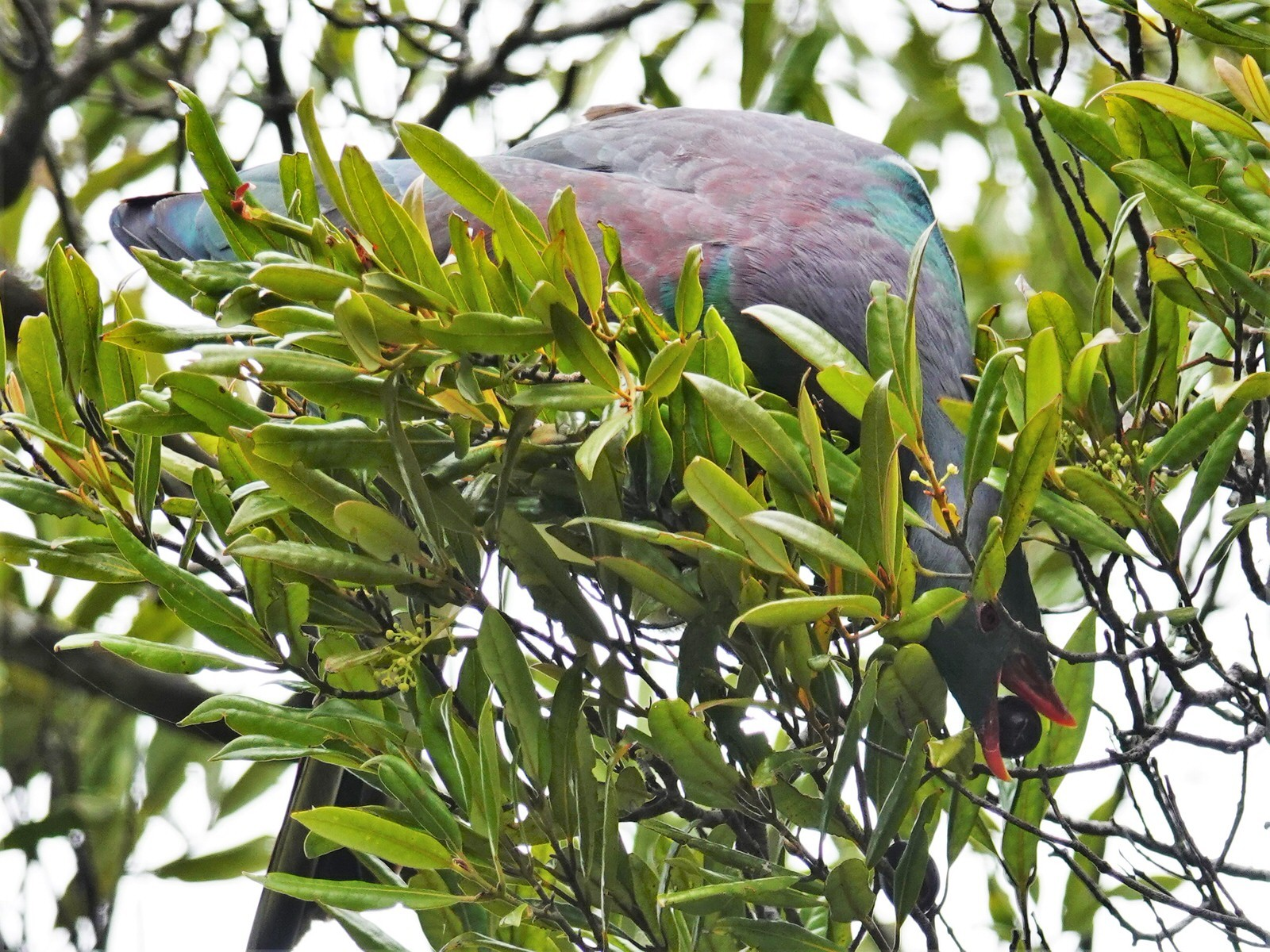
A kererū feeding on ripe tawa fruit

Tawa is notable for the fact that it relies solely on the kererū (New Zealand pigeon]) and (where present) the North Island kōkako for dispersal of its seed. These are the only remaining birds from New Zealand's original biota large enough to eat the fruits of this tree and pass the seeds through their guts and excrete them unharmed. Tawa can also support significant epiphyte gardens in their canopies, which are one of the few habitats known to be frequented by the enigmatic, arboreal striped skink.

Tawa is one of three known native New Zealand species which is host to Coptomma variegatum, a beetle species also known by the name tawa longhorn.

== Māori cultural uses and significance ==
The wood of tawa trees has traditionally been used by Māori to craft implements such as paddles, clubs, adze handles, and notably lances to spear kererū, some of which could be up to 10 m (33 ft) in length.

Both the purple flesh and the kernel of the tawa berry were used by Māori as food. The berries were steamed in a hāngī (earth oven) for two days, then washed to remove the turpentine-flavoured pulp. The dried kernels were stored. When required, they were soaked in hot water and pounded, sometimes flavouring being added to the mashed meal. Predation by invasive species has led to it becoming less available for humans. Processed tawa kernels could be stored for long periods, and after contact with Europeans, the kernels were occasionally mixed with honey and mashed to form cakes.

Large tawa trees often have significance to Māori communities and are associated with spirituality. The tawa berry flesh (tawa para) is used in whakataukī (traditional sayings) to describe cowardice, while the hard kernels (tawa uho) are used to describe courage. The phrase ahi tawa (tawa fire) can be used to describe noisy things and children, and is a reference to the loud popping sounds of tawa kernels cooking in fires.

== Modern uses ==
Early European settlers to New Zealand used the tree for timber, developing into an industry where tawa timber was exported to Australia. The wood of this tree can be used for attractive and resilient floorboarding. Although largely protected in conservation areas and by robust environmental legislation, licences are occasionally granted for the odd fallen tree to be milled for its timber.

== Namesake ==
The tree is the namesake of Tawa, a suburb of Wellington. Prior to 1959, the area was known as Tawa Flat, a name used from at least 1854, potentially originating as the name of a property owned by farmer John Woodman.

== Gallery ==
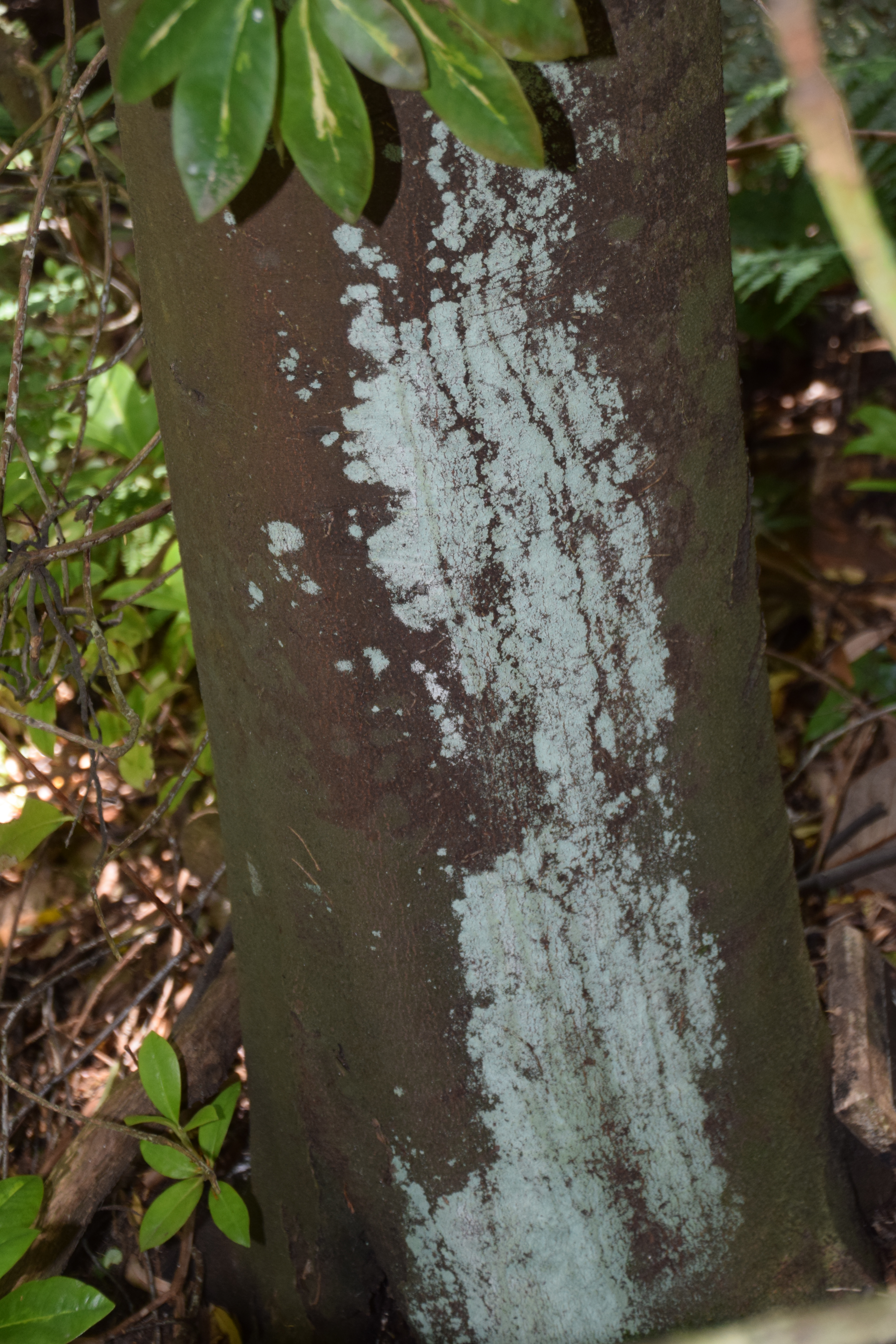
Bark

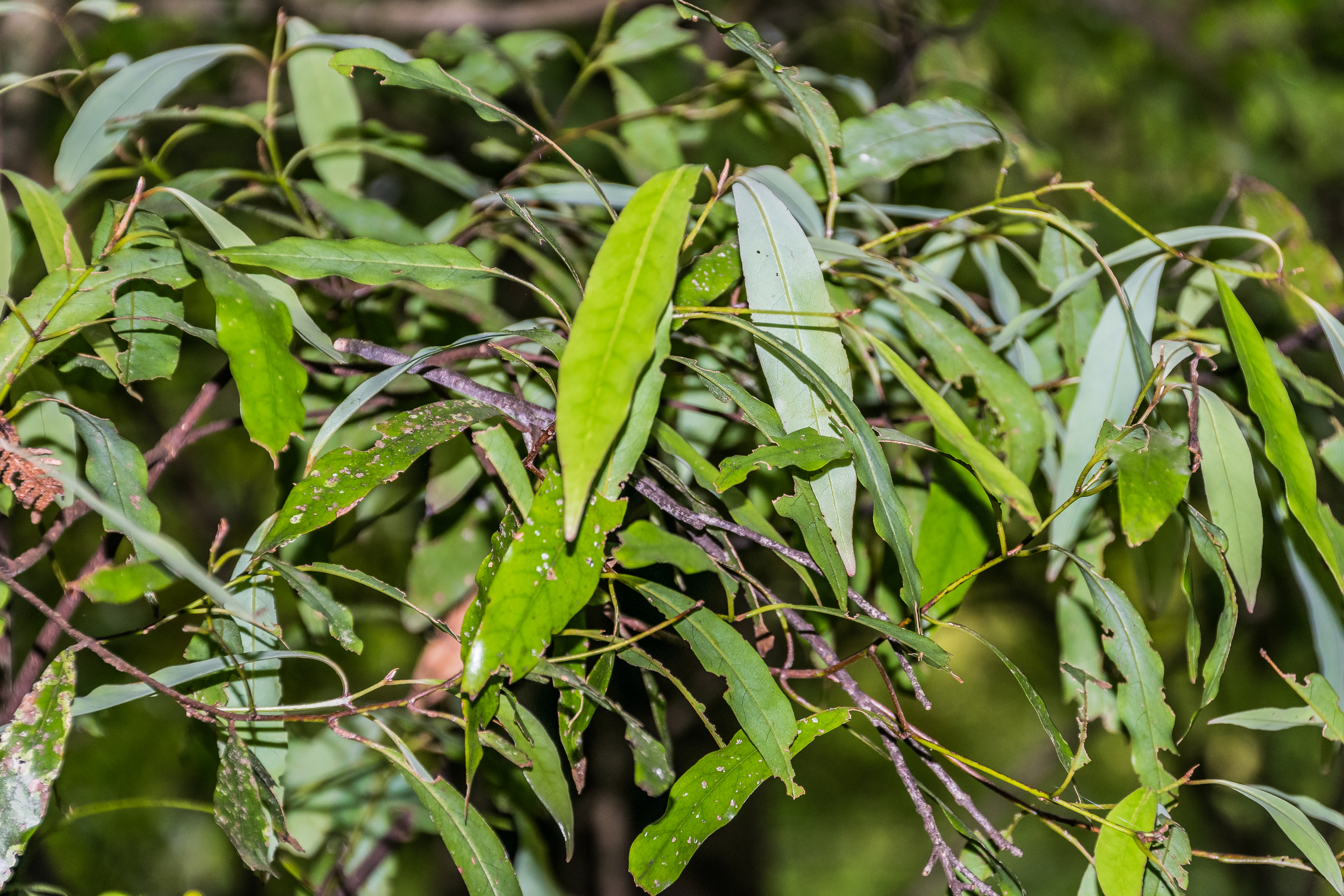
Tawa leaves

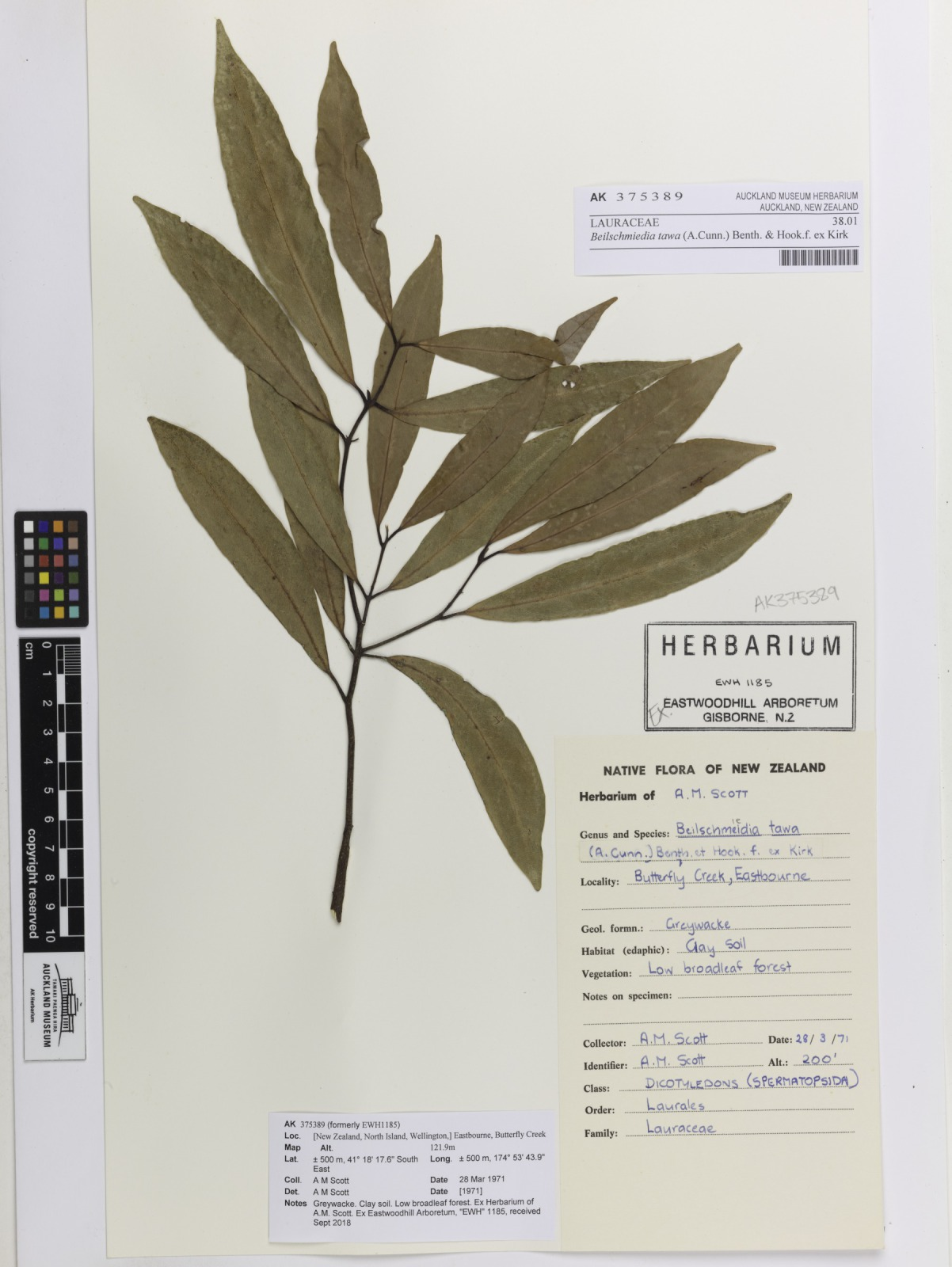
Herbarium specimen

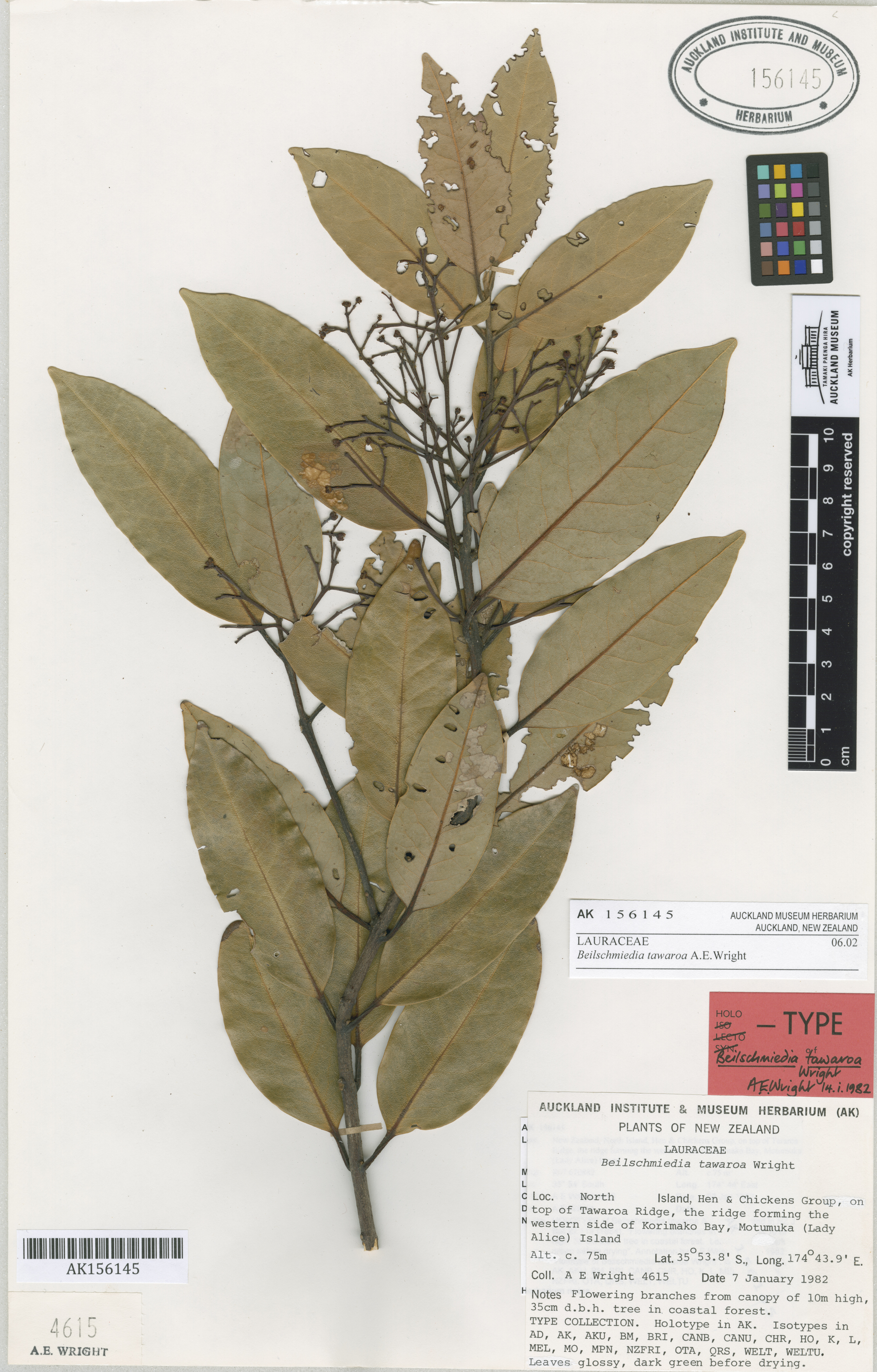
Herbarium specimen of Beilschmiedia tawaroa, since synonymised with Beilschmiedia tawa

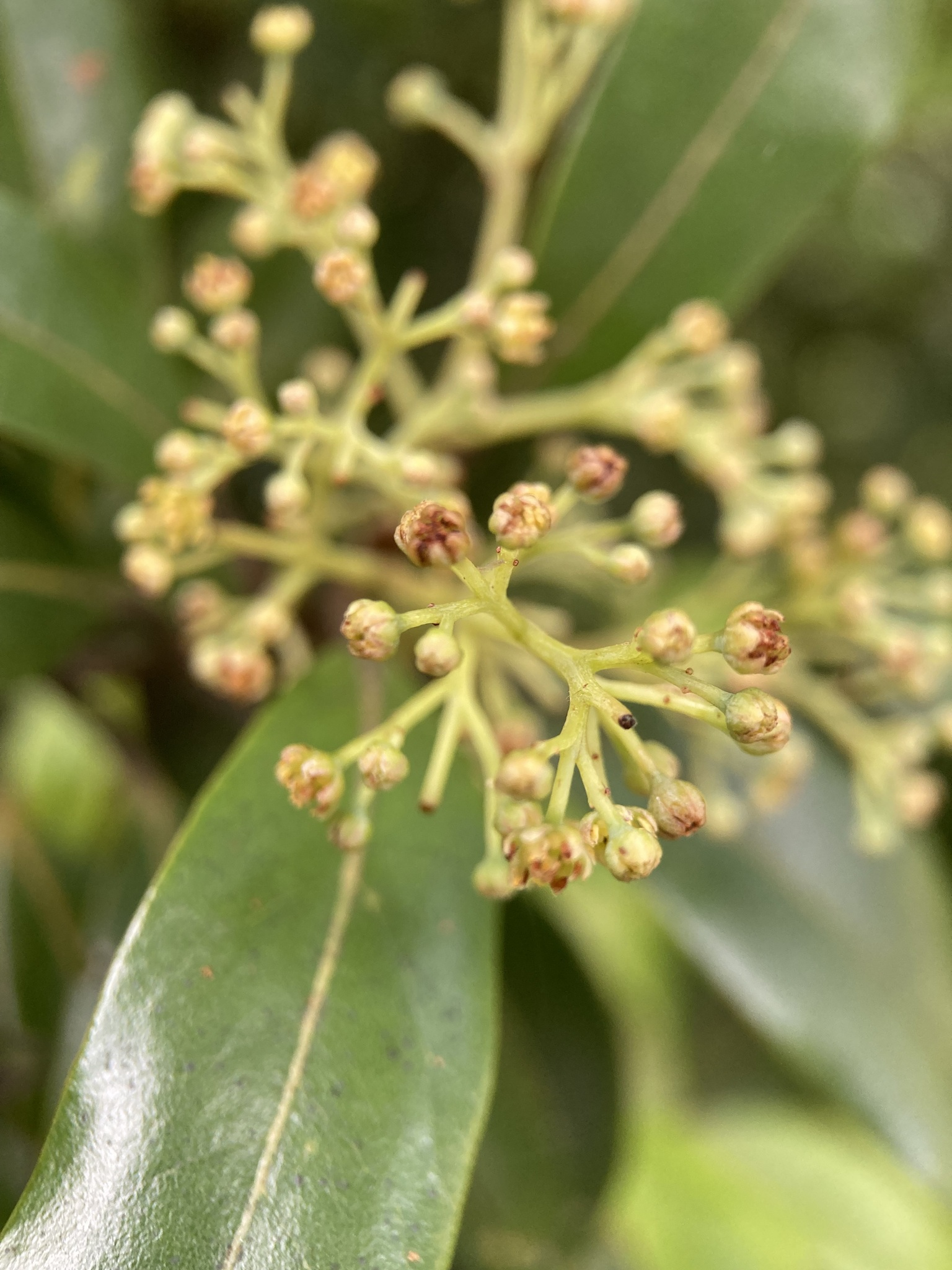
Flowers

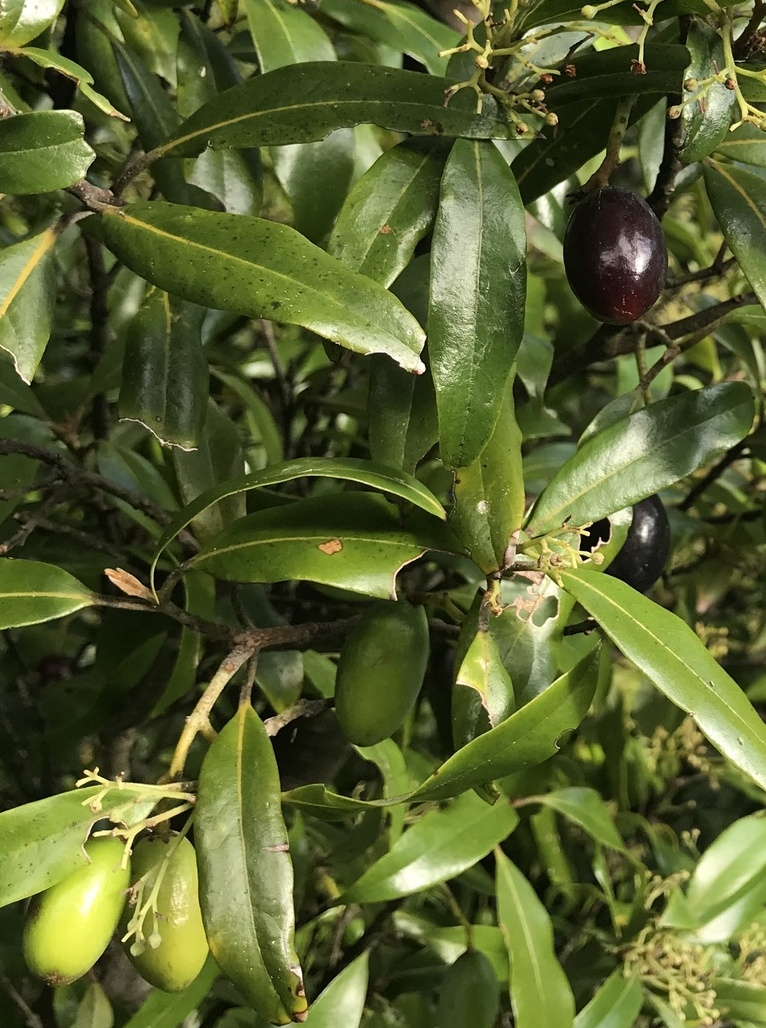
Tawa fruit ripening from green to dark purple

== See also ==
- List of trees native to New Zealand
- Beilschmiedia tarairi

== Bibliography ==
- Knowles, Barbara; Beveridge, A. E. (1982). "Biological flora of New Zealand 9. Beilschmiedia tawa (A. Cunn.) Benth. et Hook. F. ex Kirk (Lauraceae) Tawa". New Zealand Journal of Botany. 20 (1): 37–54. doi:10.1080/0028825X.1982.10426403. ISSN 0028-825X.
- Wardle, J. (1971). "The forests and shrublands of the Seaward Kaikoura Range". New Zealand Journal of Botany. 9 (2): 269–292. doi:10.1080/0028825X.1971.10429140. ISSN 0028-825X.
