= Fiordland Islands programme =

New Zealand environmental programme

The Fiordland Islands restoration programme is run by the New Zealand Department of Conservation. The purpose of the programme is to eradicate pests on key islands around Fiordland National Park, once the islands are considered predator free endangered native species will be translocated to the islands.

The programme's intentions are to create a safe home for endangered species to build up population numbers before some species can be translocated to different islands or to the New Zealand mainland.

== History of the programme ==
The New Zealand conservationist Richard Henry rescued rare birds such as kākāpō and kiwi from the Fiordland mainland. Henry translocated the birds to islands off Fiordland's coast, notably Resolution Island.

Ngāi Tahu is the iwi with mana whenua (historic rights and oversight) over Fiordland National Park.

== Pest species ==
The main pest species on the island are stoats, red deer, kiore, Norway rats, and ship rats.

As deer are known to be good swimmers populations were established on all but the most outer islands in Fiordland. Deer never colonised Breaksea or Chalky Island, and were later eradicated from Anchor Island and Secretary Island in 2002 and 2006 respectively.

== Key native fauna ==
Some key species for this project are; kākāpō, takahē, tieke, mohua, fiordland skink and rock wren.

Kākāpō can be found on Chalky and Anchor Island as a part of the Kākāpō Recovery Programme. Kākāpō previously lived on the Fiordland mainland and past translocations occurred on Resolution Island by Richard Henry, although this was unsuccessful.

== Islands involved in project ==
- Anchor Island
- Bauza Island
- Breaksea Island
- Chalky Island
- Coal Island
- Cooper Island
- Great Island
- Long Island
- Passage Island
- Resolution Island
- Secretary Island
- Steep-to Island
