= Taiari / Chalky Inlet =

Inlet in New Zealand

- Taiari (Māori)
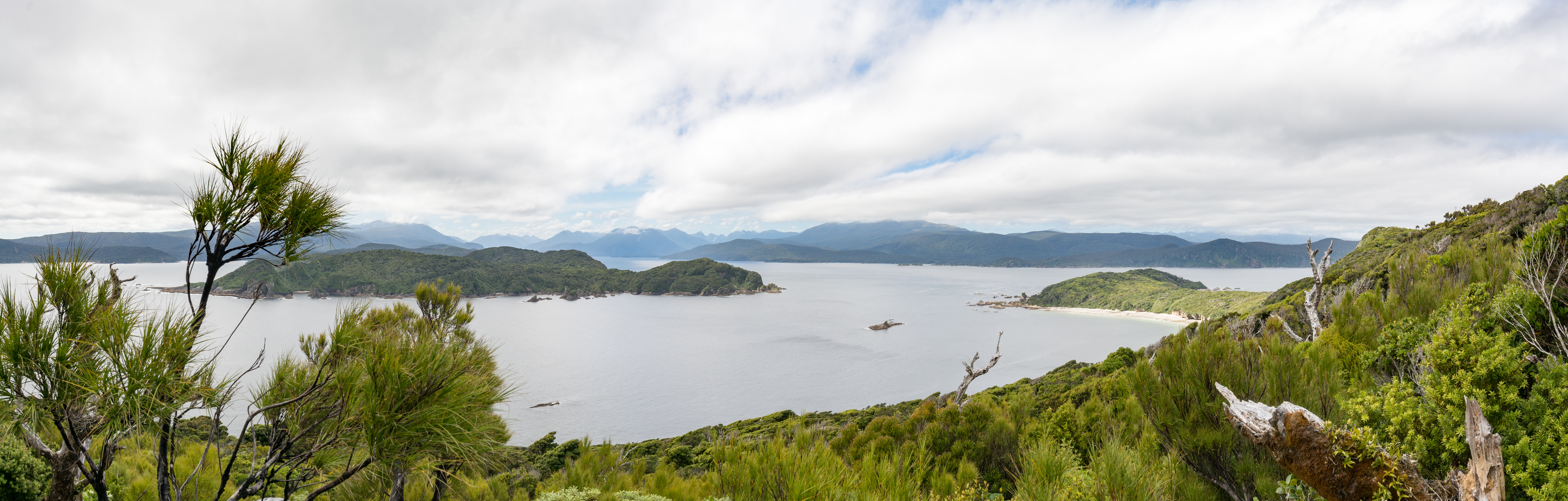
- Taiari / Chalky Inlet as seen from Te Kākahu-o-Tamatea / Chalky Island

- Location of Taiari / Chalky Inlet Taiari / Chalky Inlet (New Zealand)
- Interactive map of Taiari / Chalky Inlet
- Location: Tasman Sea
- Coordinates: 45.97°S 166.62°E
- River sources: Lumaluma Creek, Carrick River, Kohe Creek, Shallow Creek
- Catchment area: 515 km^{2} (199 sq mi)
- Basin countries: New Zealand
- Max. length: 27.7 km (17.2 mi)
- Max. width: 2.3 km (1.4 mi)
- Surface area: 110 km^{2} (42 sq mi)
- Max. depth: 374 m (1,227 ft)
- Islands: Chalky Island, Great Island, Little Island, Motutawaki, Small Craft Harbour Islands, Garden Islands
- Sections/sub-basins: Moana-whenua-pōuri / Edwardson Sound, Te Korowhakaunu / Kanáris Sound, Eastern Passage, Western Passage, Return Channel

Taiari / Chalky Inlet is one of the southernmost fiords in Fiordland, in the southwestern corner of New Zealand's South Island and part of Fiordland National Park. As with the neighbouring fiords of Tamatea / Dusky Sound to the north and Rakituma / Preservation Inlet to the south, Taiari / Chalky Inlet is a complex fiord with many channels and islands along its roughly 28 km (17 mi) length. Most notably, this includes the sections Moana-whenua-pōuri / Edwardson Sound and Te Korowhakaunu / Kanáris Sound, which split at Divide Head in the middle of Taiari and each extend for roughly 10 km (6.2 mi) inland in a V-shape.

Despite its remoteness, Taiari / Chalky Inlet has seen frequent waves of human interaction. Early European accounts suggest that a population of Māori inhabited the fiord for a time, while battles between iwi (tribes) are said to have taken place in neighbouring Rakituma, but the extent of this habitation is not known. The fiord was regularly visited by Europeans during the late 18th and early 19th centuries, with explorers including James Cook and Jules de Blosseville giving many of the features their European names. As with the rest of the Fiordland coast, the fiord was briefly inhabited by crews of whalers and sealers, until declines in the population of these animals made the industry uneconomic by the 1830s.

Following the departure of sealers from the fiord, human presence in Taiari has been at low levels, typically due to its isolation. Visits have been primarily for research or tourism, with photographs taken in the fiord during the late 19th century contributing to the campaign to establish the area as a national park. Unlike more developed fiords to the north (such as Milford Sound / Piopiotahi or Doubtful Sound / Patea), Taiari / Chalky Inlet has no defined land access, limiting human interaction to sea or air. This, along with pest control efforts on the islands within the fiord, has allowed for populations of native species to recover, although a number of invasive species remain a threat.

== Geography ==
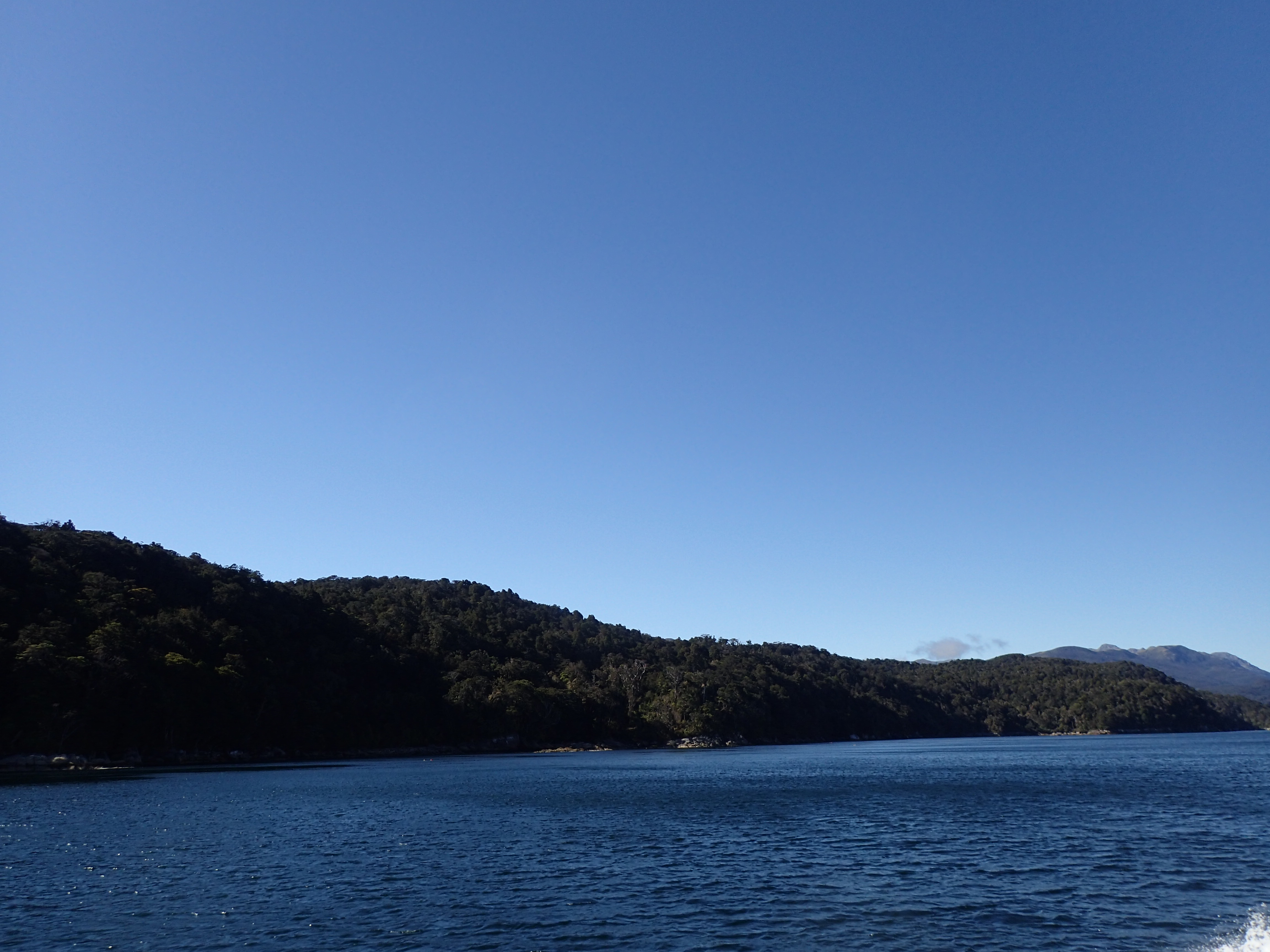
Great Island, near the entrance to Taiari / Chalky Inlet

The geography of Taiari / Chalky Inlet is complex, as it is for the neighbouring fiord complexes of Tamatea / Dusky Sound to the north and Rakituma / Preservation Inlet to the south. There are two main entrances to the fiord from the Tasman Sea, separated by a string of islands – the Eastern Passage, which continues in a northerly direction into the main channel of Taiari / Chalky Inlet, and the Western Passage, which is connected to the eastern and main channel via a number of passages between islands. These include Bad Passage (separating Chalky Island and Motutawaki), Return Channel (separating Motutawaki and Great Island), and North Port (separating Great Island from the South Island mainland).

Islands of varying sizes are found in the sound, including those at the entrance, which separate the Eastern and Western passages. Chalky Island (or Te Kākahu-o-Tamatea, so named as it was said to be the location where the explorer Tamatea laid down his cloak, or kākahu, to dry) is the most seaward of these, with both the island and the sound likely owing their English names to the white cliffs found on the island's seaward southern edge. Further from the sea are the Passage Islands, the largest of which is known as Motutawaki, from the Māori words motu for 'island' and tawaki, referring generally to large penguins such as the Fiordland crested penguin. Further still from the mouth of the fiord is Great Island, or Ōteauau, the largest island in the complex at 7.36 km^{2} (2.84 sq mi). Great Island contains two small lakes – Lakes Dobson and Esau – and reaches a height of 185 m (607 ft) above sea level. Although it is less than 300 m (980 ft) from the South Island mainland, the island is free of possums and is the site of multiple pest control initiatives to prevent pests from accessing other islands via Great Island. Little Island sits in the narrow channel between Great Island and the South Island. Beyond this primary chain of islands, there is a small group of islands known as the Small Craft Harbour islands, located about 15 km (9.3 mi) from the fiord's mouth, near its divergence into two separate fiords. Closer to the mouth, the Garden islands are another small group, located on the eastern edge of the fiord, at the entrance to South Port.

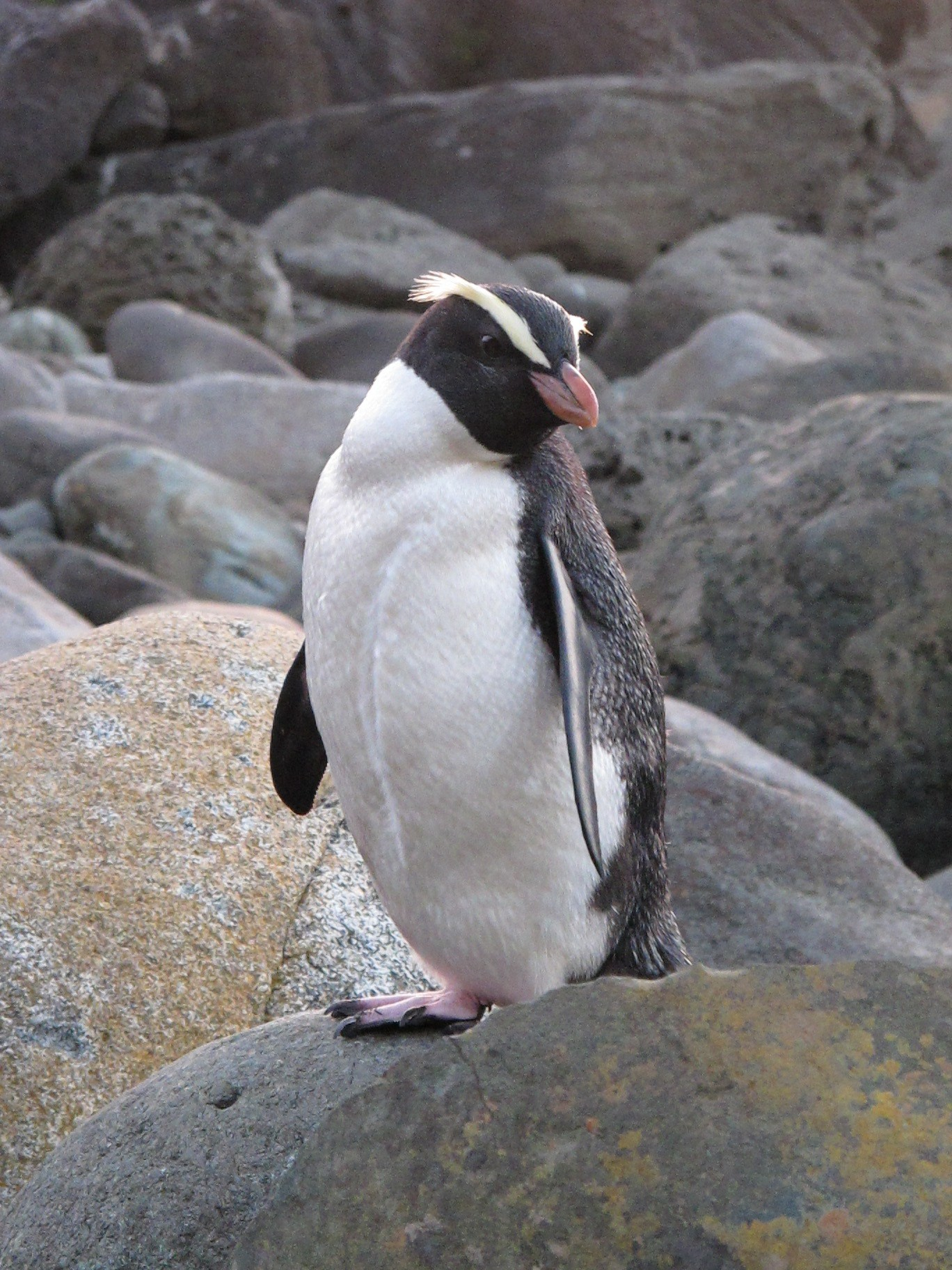
A Tawaki, or Fiordland-Crested Penguin, typical of the penguins which Motutawaki is named after

Approximately 15 km (9.3 mi) from the fiord's mouth, the fiord splits in two. Moana-whenua-pōuri / Edwardson Sound continues the roughly northeast–southwest orientation of the main length of Taiari, whilst Te Korowhakaunu / Kanáris Sound splits off from this in an east–west orientation. The head between these two fiords, on the northern edge of Te Korowhakaunu and the eastern edge of Moana-whenua-pōuri, is known as Divide Head in English. The Māori names of the point and the hill behind it are Te Tapuwae-o-Māui (the footprint of Māui) and Te Rereka-o-Māui (the leap of Māui) respectively. These names both come from the Māori creation myth for the fiord, in which the demigod Māui is said to have leapt ashore at that point. In one legend, Māui is said to have slipped over, with his extended arms creating both Te Korowhakaunu and Moana-whenua-pōuri in the process. In another account, Te Korowhakaunu already existed, with the mud and water kicked up when Māui's foot slipped creating Moana-whenua-pōuri.

=== Te Korowhakaunu / Kanáris Sound ===
The main length of Te Korowhakaunu / Kanáris Sound extends for 10.3 km (6.4 mi) from its head at the Dark Cloud Range, in a roughly westerly direction towards the main channel of Taiari / Chalky Inlet. The fiord is slightly shallower than the main channel of Taiari, reaching a maximum depth of 323 m (1,060 ft) compared to 374 m (1,227 ft) for the main fiord. A small string of islands, the Small Craft Harbour Islands, lies close to the sound's junction with the main channel of Taiari / Chalky Inlet.

At its head, the fiord is split into two smaller coves, separated by the aptly-named Two Cove Head. The northernmost of these, Islet Cove, is fed by the Carrick River, one of the largest inflows into the entire complex. The other cove, Cliff Cove, does not have any inflows of the same degree. However, the cove marks the closest point between the Chalky Inlet complex and that of neighbouring Rakituma / Preservation Inlet, at just over 500 metres from Te Awaroa / Long Sound. The isthmus between the two fiords constitutes part of the Dark Cloud Range, which extends seaward to form the southern side of Te Korowhakaunu / Kanáris Sound and the eastern edge of Taiari / Chalky Inlet. This peninsula reaches a maximum height of 1,043 m (3,422 ft) at Treble Mountain, and was formerly given a name of French origin – Presqu'île Bréauté – by an 1826 French expedition, however this name fell into disuse. The name Cunaris Sound stems from this expedition, although the exact etymology is unclear. It was previously believed to be derived from the plural of the French name for the canary, canaris, in reference to the bellbirds prevalent in the area at the time. However, evidence has since suggested that the fiord was instead named after Konstantinos Kanaris, a hero of the Greek War of Independence, and in 2021 the spelling of the European portion of the name was altered to Kanáris Sound to reflect this naming origin.

To the north of Kanáris Sound lie two hill formations, separated by a small glacial valley. These constitute the Tower Hills on the east and Te Rereka-o-Māui on the west, and consist of primarily schist and greywacke, with small portions of gneiss.

=== Moana-whenua-pōuri / Edwardson Sound ===
The hills that constitute the northern edge of Kanáris Sound also form the eastern edge of Moana-whenua-pōuri / Edwardson Sound. This fiord continues the northeast–southwest orientation of the majority of Taiari, beginning roughly 10 km (6.2 mi) from its junction with Te Korowhakaunu. Opposite the fiord from Te Rereka-o-Māui, the Kakapo Range continues roughly parallel to the fiord for much of its length with a maximum height of 1,130 m (3,710 ft) at The Stopper.

The northern limit of the fiord consists of a small sheltered cove known as Lake Cove, into which the two primary tributaries of this branch flow. To the east of the cove, Cora Lynn Falls drains the outflow from a series of lakes (from upstream to downstream, lakes Purser, Carrick, and Cadman) that extend towards Tamatea / Dusky Sound. The second inflow into Lake Cove is Lumaluma Creek, which drains a large catchment area including multiple small tarns. Numerous small creeks flow along both edges of the fiord, fed by the 2–4 metres of rain which falls around the fiord annually.

Moana-whenua-pōuri is significantly shallower than either Chalky Inlet or Kanáris Sound. Unlike many of the other fiords in the region, including the others in the Taiari complex, this fiord gets progressively shallower from its mouth, with no basins to speak of. The upper reaches of the fiord are as shallow as 60 m (200 ft), a depth equal to only the sill depth of Eastern Passage.

== History ==
Not much is known about Māori habitation of Fiordland prior to the arrival of Europeans. The conditions in Fiordland were not hospitable to ongoing habitation, although expeditions for exploration, hunting, and gathering of resources such as pounamu took place soon after the arrival of Māori in New Zealand, roughly 700 years ago. More permanent occupation took place in the 18th century, when remnants of the iwi (tribe) Kāti Māmoe fled into the area following a Ngāi Tahu conquest of the South Island, constructing a pā on Matauira in neighbouring Rakituma / Preservation Inlet. Ngāi Tahu forces pursued Kāti Māmoe to this point, with the pā said to be the site of a battle between the two. Several European explorers noted evidence of Māori habitation in the fiords and surrounding areas, while evidence of seasonal habitation has also been identified through archaeological studies of the region.

Captain James Cook was the first European to see Taiari / Chalky Inlet during his second voyage in 1773, naming both it and Chalky Island after the white cliffs on the island's seaward side. Cook did not enter the fiord, owing to poor weather conditions, and sailed past en route to Tamatea / Dusky Sound. The first Europeans known to have entered and explored the complex came in 1813, when the cutter Snapper entered the fiord and established a camp in the upper reaches of Edwardson Sound, which they so named after the ship's captain, Captain Edwardson. The Snapper left after a few months, returning in 1820 once they believed bird populations in the area had replenished. Edwardson's account of this return described the environment around Lake Cove and the changes which he witnessed from his first experience. The cove, which had been a lagoon impossible to enter by ship on their first visit due to dangerous tides and silt, had opened up into a deep harbour large enough to hold a whaling ship, with two large river inflows instead of one.

Notes from Edwardson's visits were incorporated into a comprehensive account of the region by Jules de Blosseville, part of an 1826 French expedition. The French expedition named a number of features, although the majority of these have since been replaced by English or Māori names. These include Presqu'île le Chevalier at the northern edge of Western passage (now Cape Providence) and Presqu'île Bréauté (now the Treble Mountain peninsula). Other names, such as Kanáris Sound or Puysegur Point (in neighbouring Preservation Inlet) have been adapted from the French names from this expedition.

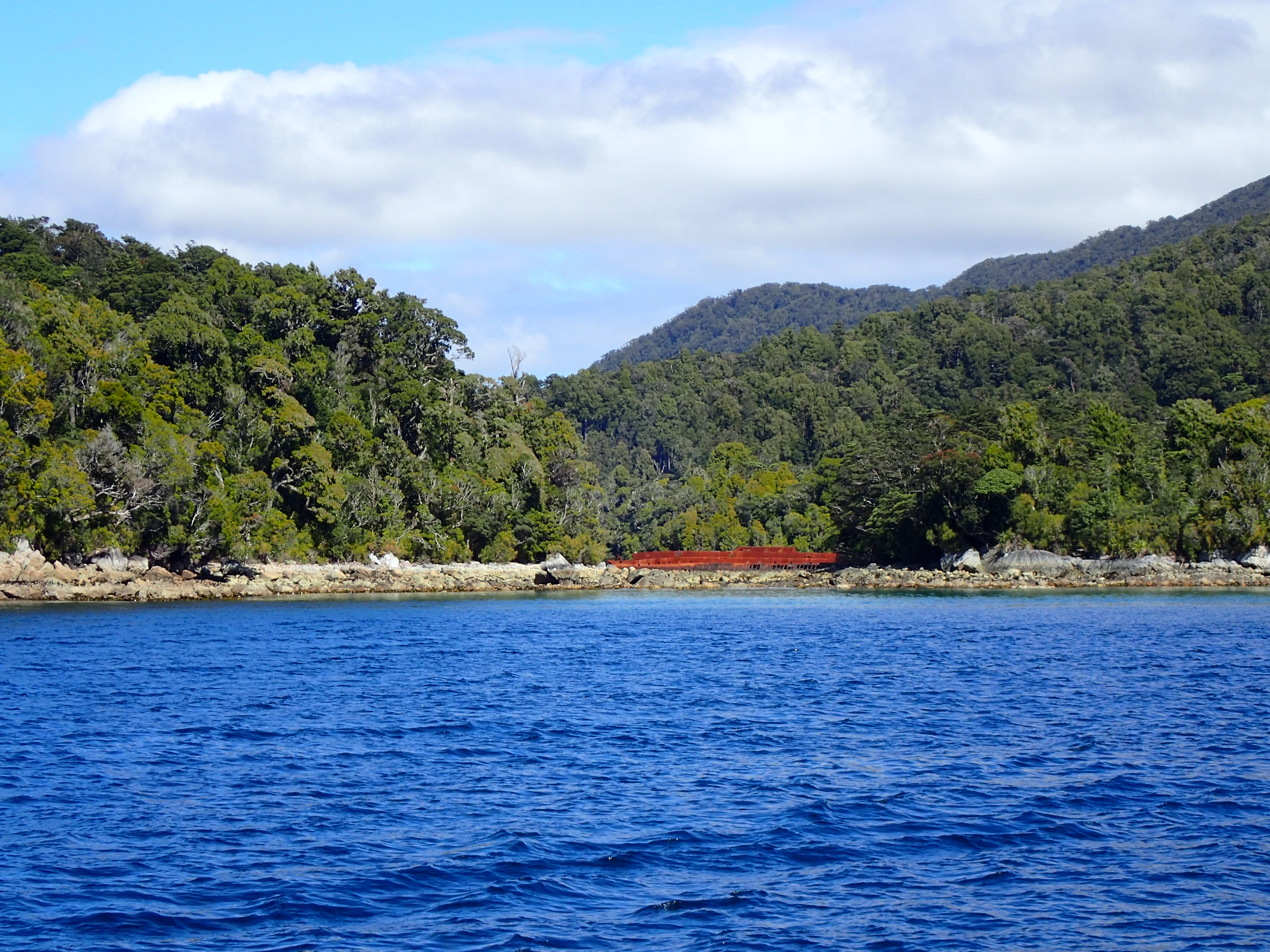
Wreck of the GSS Stella in North Port

From this point, European activity in the region came in waves, due in equal parts to economic and scientific endeavours. Sealers frequented the Fiordland coast throughout the 1820s, although this came to a quick end due to severe depletion of the seal populations making the activities uneconomic. The area was surveyed again around 1850 by HMS Acheron under Captain John Lort Stokes. One of the first accounts of the geological composition of the region was made by the ship's surgeon, who noted the occurrence of pink granite and the presence of coal. Further expeditions by other Europeans into the 1860s and 1870s built on this work, identifying with greater detail the distribution of potentially valuable resources within the region. This culminated in a brief gold rush and attempt at permanent settlement in Rakituma / Preservation Inlet during the 1880s, however despite reports of similar deposits in the headwaters of Taiari / Chalky Inlet, the activity did not spread and quickly dissipated.

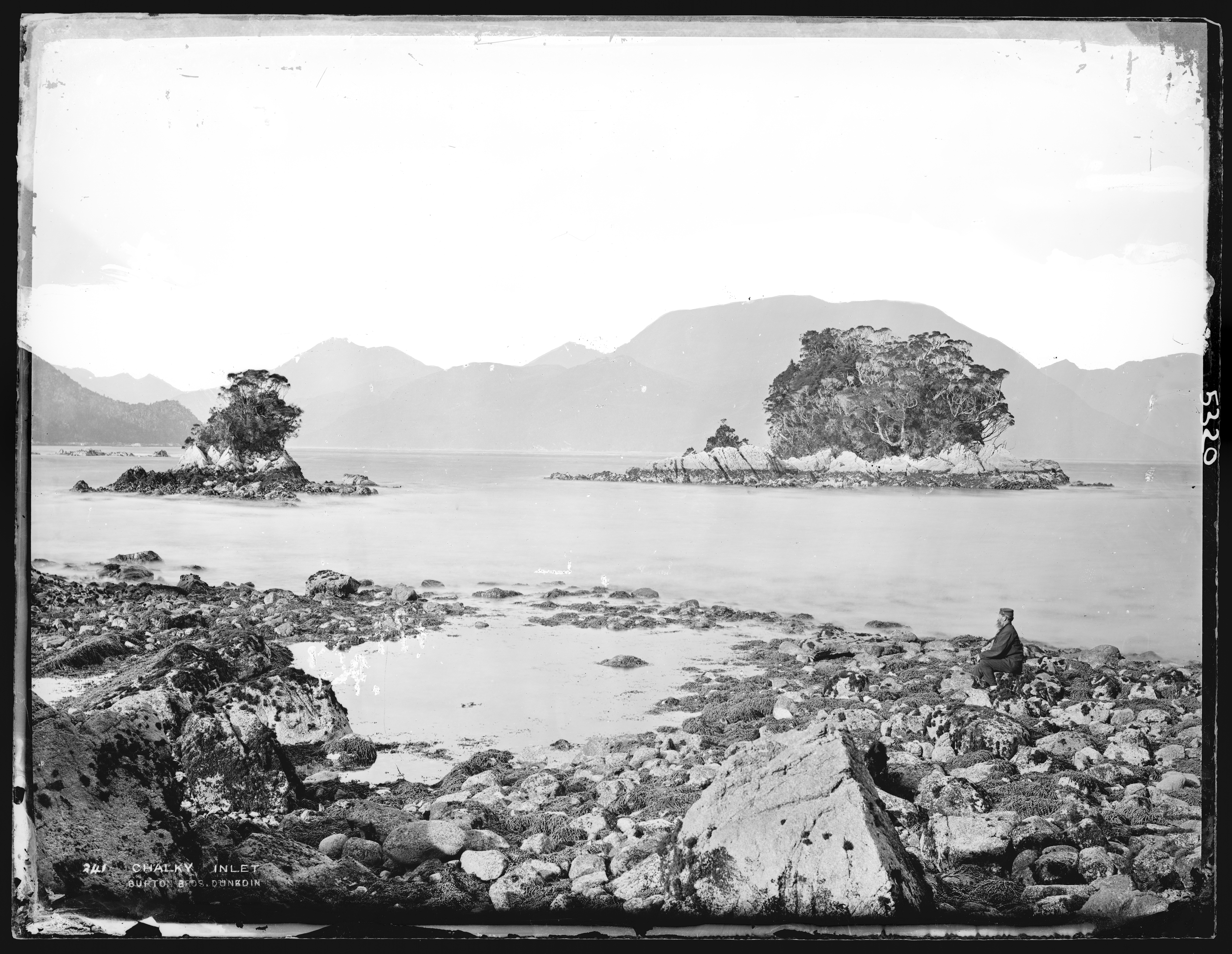
View of Taiari / Chalky Inlet, 1874, by Alfred Burton

At the same time as these numerous sea-based voyages into the fiords, attempts at land-based expeditions were also undertaken. The most prominent of these was that of Alfred Henry Burton, a Dunedin-based photographer and part of the Burton Brothers photographic studio. Burton travelled extensively within Fiordland (as well as the rest of New Zealand) and made several trips during his career by both land (on horseback) and sea. His photographs of the unspoilt environment contributed to the campaign to establish the area as a National Park, which was eventually established as a "National reserve" in 1904 before officially becoming New Zealand's third national park with the passage of the National Parks Act 1952.

Since this, Taiari / Chalky Inlet has seen low levels of human interaction, with its isolation preventing the development seen in fiords further north, such as Milford Sound / Piopiotahi or Doubtful Sound / Patea. There is no defined land route to the fiord, and as such it is very difficult to reach even by foot. Despite the remoteness, tourism to the area has been increasing during and since the COVID-19 pandemic. The large decline of international visitors resulted in some tourism operators in Milford Sound / Piopiotahi relocating their vessels further south, typically offering trips to Taiari / Chalky and Rakituma / Preservation out of Tamatea / Dusky Sound.

Efforts have also been made in recent years to restore the cultural history of Māori within Fiordland. This culminated in 2019 with the renaming of multiple fiords to dual names, including the renaming of Chalky Inlet, Edwardson Sound and Cunaris Sound to their respective dual names.

== Ecology ==
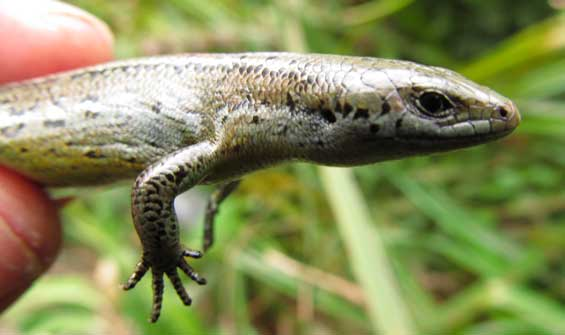
Te Kakahu skink, a species endemic to Te Kākahu-o-Tamatea

Despite Taiari / Chalky Inlet's remote location, it did not escape the ecological impact of human settlement. The seal population of the fiord was decimated by hunters during the early 19th century, leading to the local collapse of the industry by the 1830s. As with the rest of New Zealand, a number of invasive species – including stoats, rats and possums – have been found in the area around the fiord.

In the years since human interaction shifted from primarily economic to scientific and environmental, efforts have been made to restore the environment and reduce the impact of human settlement. A 1977 study identified a number of invasive species to remove from the area, including noting the impact of deer on the area. Invasive species remain a threat to the fiord complex, with the invasive seaweed Undaria discovered in 2019. Owing to the small amount detected, active efforts are in place to eradicate Undaria from the fiord with control measures around the area in place. Similar efforts were launched in August 2022 in response to the discovery of stoat prints on Chalky Island, the outermost of three predator-free islands in the fiord. More than 100 stoat traps were set on the island in response to the sighting, with staff from the Department of Conservation seeking to capture it as part of wider pest control efforts in Fiordland. This was the beginning of an eight-month campaign, before the stoat was eventually caught in late April 2023.

Aside from this stoat, pest control efforts on the islands in Taiari / Chalky Inlet have led to the eradication of pests from Great Island, the Passage Islands (including Motutawaki) and Chalky Island, all of which have been declared predator-free since 1999. This has allowed the islands to become a sanctuary for many native species which have been reintroduced to the area since 2002, including the mōhua, orange-fronted kākāriki, little spotted kiwi, and tīeke. Chalky Island is also home to the Te Kakahu skink, an endemic skink discovered in 2002 and confirmed as a separate species in 2011. The fiord also contains multiple petrel colonies, like many other fiords in the area.

== See also ==
- List of fiords of New Zealand
