= Theridion longicrure =

Conservation status
- Naturally Uncommon (NZ TCS)

Scientific classification
- Kingdom: Animalia
- Phylum: Arthropoda
- Subphylum: Chelicerata
- Class: Arachnida
- Order: Araneae
- Infraorder: Araneomorphae
- Family: Theridiidae
- Genus: Theridion
- Species: T. longicrure

Binomial name
- Theridion longicrure Marples, 1956

Species of spider

Theridion longicrure is a species of Theridiidae that is endemic to New Zealand.

== Taxonomy ==
This species was described by Brian John Marples in 1956 from a male specimen.

== Description ==
The male is recorded at 2.78mm in length.

== Distribution ==
This species is only known from Great Island in Three Kings Islands, New Zealand.

== Conservation status ==
Under the New Zealand Threat Classification System, this species is listed as "Naturally Uncommon" with the qualifiers of "Island Endemic" and "Range Restricted".
