= Birds of New Zealand =

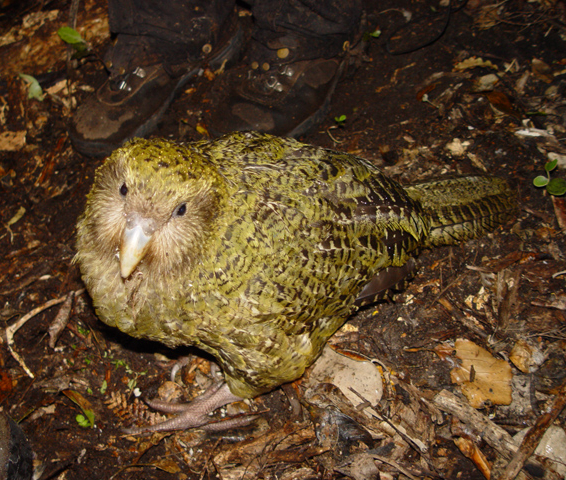
Kākāpō (Strigops habroptilus), typically weighing 3 kg and possibly one of the world's longest-living birds

The birds of New Zealand evolved into an avifauna that included many endemic species found in no other country. As an island archipelago, New Zealand accumulated bird diversity.

The mix includes species with unusual biology such as the kākāpō, which is the world's only flightless, nocturnal parrot and exhibits competitive display breeding using leks.

There are also many species that are similar to neighbouring land areas. A process of colonisation, speciation and extinction has been at play over many millions of years, including recent times. Some species have arrived in human recorded history, while others arrived earlier but are little changed.

== History after human settlement ==
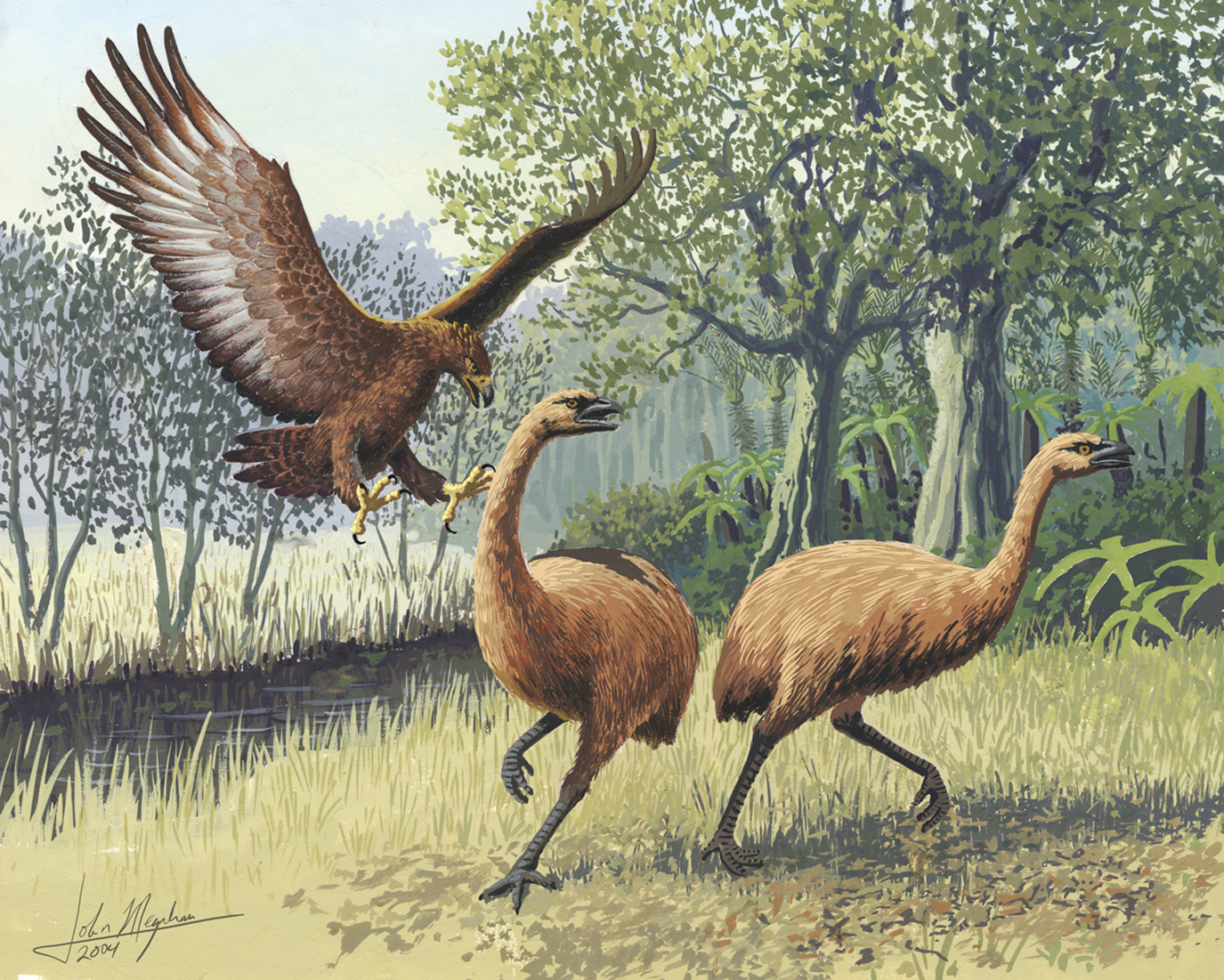
Artist's rendition of a Haast's eagle (Hieraaetus moorei) attacking two moa (Dinornis novaezealandiae)

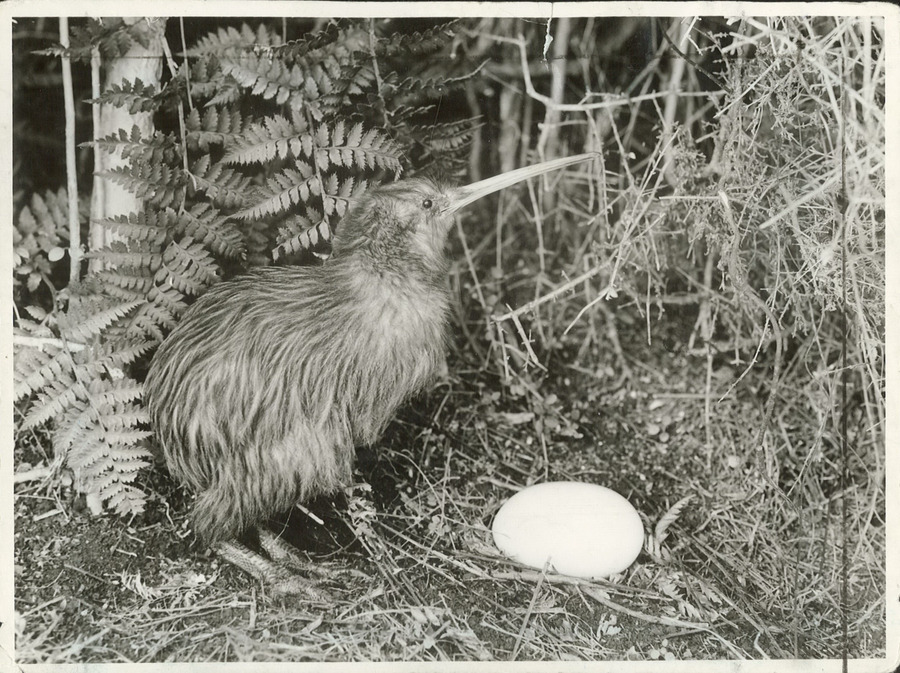
Photo of a kiwi (genus Apteryx) and its egg

When Polynesian Māori arrived in New Zealand about 700 years ago, the environment changed quickly. Several species were hunted to extinction by colonising peoples, most notably the moa (Dinornithidae) and Haast's eagle (Hieraaetus moorei). The most damage was caused by habitat destruction and the other animals humans brought with them, particularly rats – the Polynesian rat or kiore introduced by Māori and the brown rat and black rat subsequently introduced by Europeans 400 years later. Mice, dogs, cats, stoats, weasels, pigs, goats, deer, hedgehogs, and Australian possums also put pressure upon native bird species. The flightless birds were especially sensitive. Birds like the kākāpō and kiwi were unable to fly and therefore unable to lay their eggs in elevated areas, which increases the probability of predators (e.g., stoats, weasels) discovering their eggs.

Consequently, many bird species became extinct, and others remain critically endangered. Nearly half of New Zealand's native birds were driven to extinction following human settlement, one of the largest waves of extinction in global history. Several species are now confined only to offshore islands, or to fenced "ecological islands" from which predators have been eliminated. New Zealand is a world leader in the techniques required to bring severely endangered species back from the brink of extinction, alongside creating spaces for endangered species to rebuild their populations. These spaces include 44 marine reserves, 13 national parks, and many more protected areas across the country. In total, there are over 100,000 protected areas that cover 1/3 of the country. With these protective areas, flightless birds in particular are less susceptible to hunting, introduced species, and land-use change.

== Comparison to global bird fauna ==
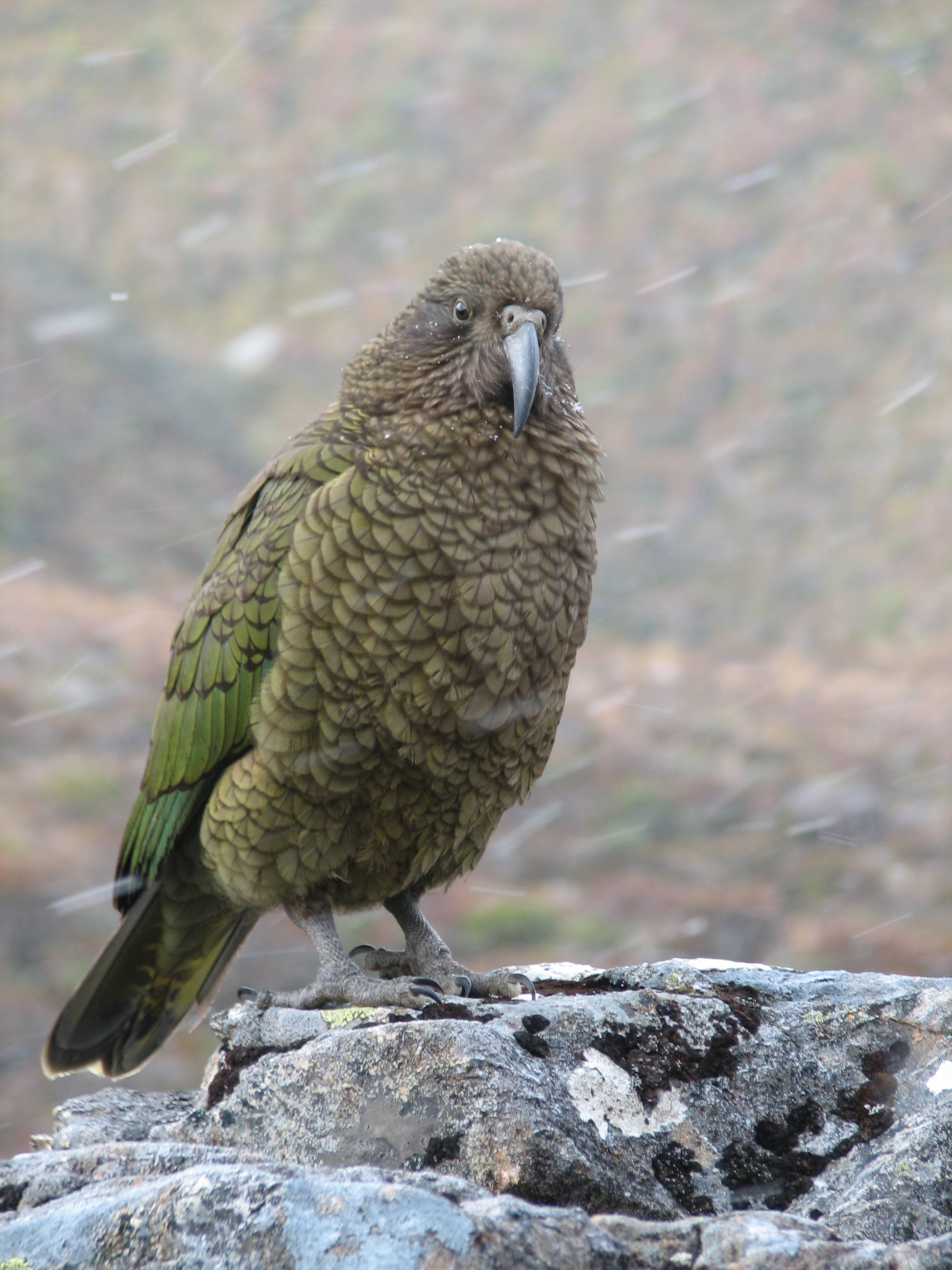
Kea (Nestor notabilis), the world's only alpine parrot, is very inquisitive and intelligent

New Zealand is a significant contributor to global bird, and overall, species diversity. According to New Zealand's Ministry for the Environment, the country has an estimated 80,000 species of native flora and fauna. All frogs and reptiles, ~90% of insects, ~80% of vascular plants, and ~25% of bird species found in New Zealand are only found in the island nation. There has been a shift in bird composition following European colonisation, including the overexploitation of endemic bird species for sport, introduction of nonnative species for insect control and sport, alongside colonising predators declining the defenceless New Zealand bird population. Terrestrial, wetland, and seabirds in New Zealand each measure to be one-third of the total number of species in the country. These three categories are the entire bird consistency of New Zealand. On the contrary, for the globe, terrestrial birds compose 90% of bird species.

== Conservation ==
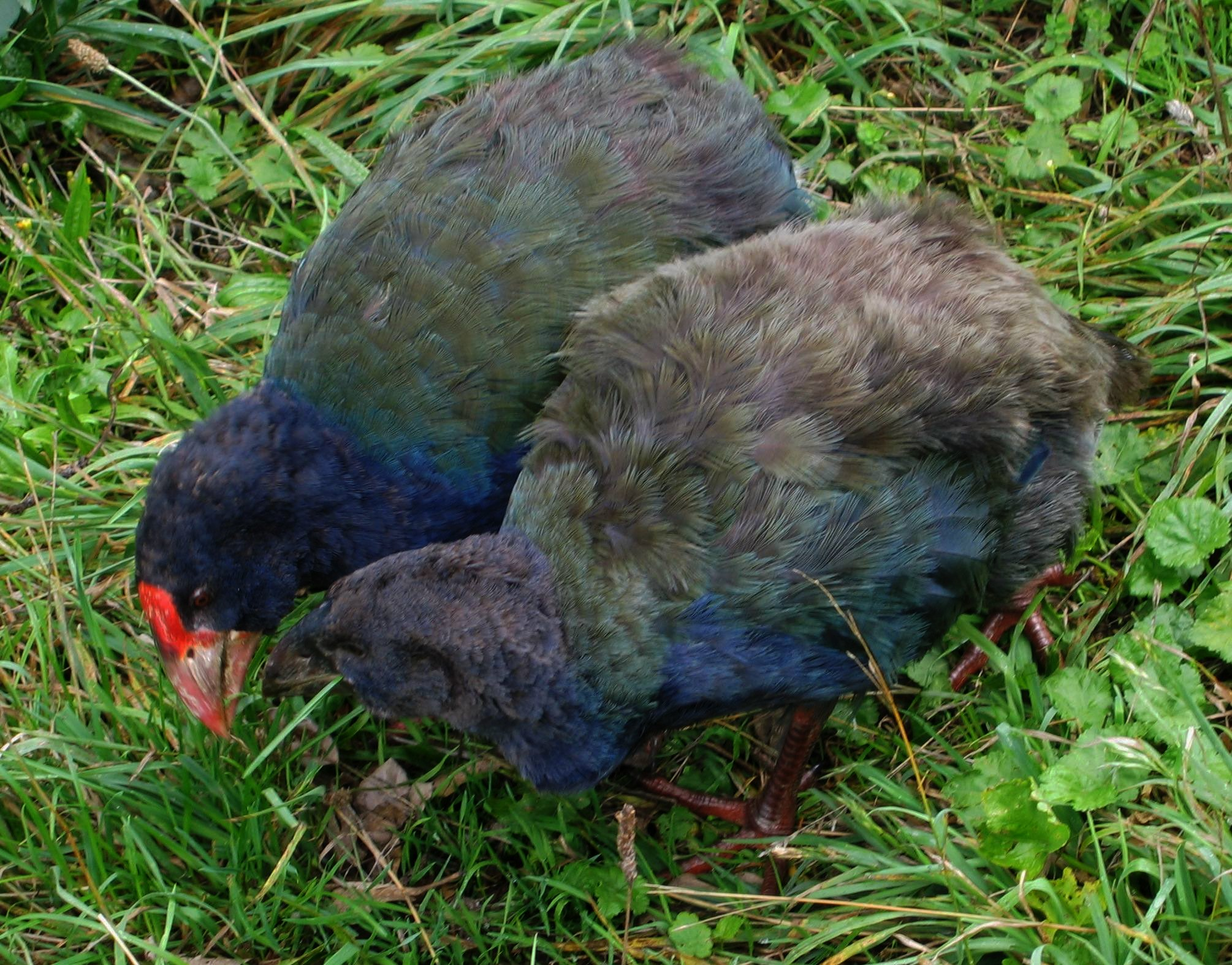
Adult takahē (Porphyrio hochstetteri) feeding a chick

When humans first arrived in New Zealand, there were at least 131 species of land, freshwater and coastal birds, and another 65 species of seabirds (gulls, albatrosses, petrels and penguins), making at least 196 native species in total, according to a 1997 report (this count may have risen since as subspecies have been reclassified as species). Of the 131 species that lived on or near land, 93 (or 71%) were endemic, and of the 65 seabirds, 22 (or 34%) were endemic, making 115 (or 59%) endemic species in total. As of 2018, at least 60 birds, three frogs, seven vascular plants, and an immeasurable number of invertebrate species have been lost forever due to the dual efforts of climate change and invasive species.

Due to habitat loss, their historical use as a food source by Māori, and predation by introduced species, many birds have become extinct and numerous more are threatened with extinction. As of 2019, 74% of New Zealand's terrestrial birds are considered to be threatened or at risk of extinction. Huge conservation efforts are being made to save bird species, including the takahē, kākāpō, mohua, kōkako, whio, hihi and the kiwi. One well documented conservation success story, due in a large part to the efforts of Don Merton, is the saving of the black robin on the Chatham Islands. Another key example, the kiwi and whio, where recent human intervention has improved nesting and hatching success from 8–10% to 90%. By creating physical barriers to prevent predators from approaching nesting areas or relocating predators, kiwi and other terrestrial birds have been able to rebound and increase their populations tremendously.

From the time of first human settlement until 1994, 43 (or 46%) of the 93 endemic land, freshwater and coastal bird species have become extinct, as have 4 of the 22 endemic seabird species (making 41% of all endemic species extinct), according to a 1997 report. Fifteen species extinctions have occurred since 1840 (this count will have risen to 16 when the North Island snipe was raised from subspecies to species level). According to the 2005 New Zealand Threat Classification System list, 153 species or subspecies were then threatened with extinction. If New Zealand's currently threatened bird species go extinct, it is estimated it would take from 10 to 50 million years to return to today's biodiversity levels via natural evolutionary processes.

Current conservation efforts encompass nonprofit and community groups and projects, including Save Our Iconic Kiwi, Takahē Recovery Programme, Kākāpō Recovery, the National Audubon Society, the Forest and Bird, among others supported by the Department of Conservation. Efforts expand from raising funds to supplement existing and new projects, alongside exposing the public to the endemic fauna and encouraging individual acknowledgement of the crisis via tourism in conservation areas. Several acts that influence New Zealand bird biodiversity include the Conservation Act 1987, Forests Act 1949, Marine and Coastal Area Act 2011, National Parks Act 1980, Reserves Act 1977, Trade in Endangered Species Act 1989, Wildlife Act 1953, Natural and Built Environment Act 2023, Wild Animal Control Act 1977, Dog Control Act 1996, Environment Act 1986, and the Hazardous Substances and New Organisms Act 1996. Alongside the new Natural and Built Environment Act 2023, the only other item that is tremendously influencing New Zealand's bird biodiversity is Predator Free 2050, a radical initiative set to eradicate colonised predators that threaten endemic species within half a century.

=== Predator Free 2050 ===
In 2016, the government of New Zealand asked the country's Department of Conservation to develop a programme that would use knowledge from iwi, whānau, and hapū groups, alongside conservation experts and people who partook in the Predator Free movement years prior. This project is the first heavily publicised conservation collaboration between Māori peoples and the federal government. The Predator Free 2050 Strategy launched in March 2020, alongside its first five-year action plan that highlighted not only the government's vision for the plan but also pathways of how to use the 5-year plan by individuals and groups across the country. The plan consists of three actions: mobilise, innovate, and accelerate. Mobilisation involves taking the steps needed to build predator-free communities and establish collaborations across a given region and the nation as a whole. Innovation involves developing new and transformative tools and techniques required and needed to remove predators from New Zealand's ecosystems. Finally, accelerate involves applying the tools and techniques of the plan nationwide, concurrently with their development. All progress reports following the programme's release are publicly available through the New Zealand Government's webpage. For the Predator Free 2050 initiative, the 2023 update has produced promising results regarding the mobilisation and innovation efforts within the initiative.

=== Case study: kiwi conservation efforts ===
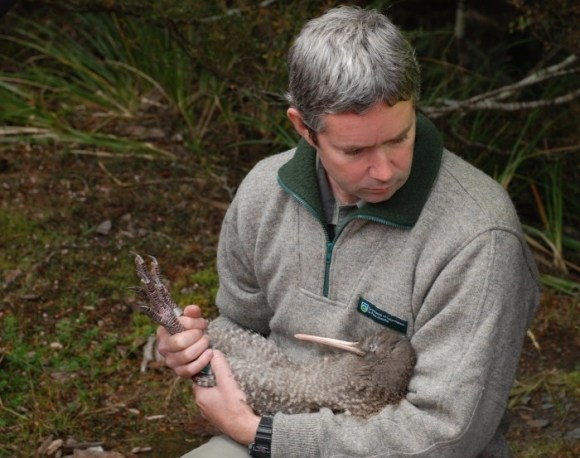
Chris Goulding, from the New Zealand Department of Conservation, holding a great spotted kiwi (Apteryx haastii) during a bird release in Kahurangi National Park in 2016

Current kiwi conservation work is based on a collaboration between the New Zealand government, community and iwi-led groups, and various conservation organisations in the North and South Islands. As kiwi are the nation's icon, New Zealanders often refer to themselves as "Kiwis". As a keystone species, they have an enormous contribution to seed dispersal and population control of insects and grubs, helping regenerate endemic flora. This contribution is disproportionate compared to their current abundance across the country. As of 2024, from the 12 million that was estimated prior to human colonisation, kiwi populations are estimated to be around 70,000. On average, the kiwi population in New Zealand is declining by 2% annually, with 20 kiwi dying each week. Thus far, the goal is to increase the great spotted kiwi population annually by at least 2% through control of predators to ensure chick survival. The survival rate of a kiwi chick is about 10% without predator control due to stoats and other mammals. Before Predator Free 2050, the Kiwi Recovery Plan 2018–2028 was a conservation effort spearheaded by New Zealand's Department of Conservation. Much of the plan's short- and long-term goals were formulated by the Predator Free 2050 initiative released in 2020. According to the kiwi monitoring programme provided by the New Zealand government, which has documented a kiwi conservation study since 1992, kiwi chick survival was boosted to 50% following pest control and reduction in pesticide use. Save the Kiwi organisation and many other independent research projects have focused on the North Island due to being a major hub for community-led kiwi conservation. As of 2020, the 11 projects that the organisation funds through Jobs for Nature exceeded all their targets when it came to predator control in various regions of the North Island and kiwi rehabilitation in protected areas, including 127,432 hectares of mustelid-controlled habitat.

== See also ==
- Biodiversity of New Zealand
- Fauna of New Zealand
- Forest & Bird, an organisation
- List of birds of New Zealand
- List of endemic birds of New Zealand
- Ornithological Society of New Zealand, also known as Birds New Zealand
- Parrots of New Zealand
