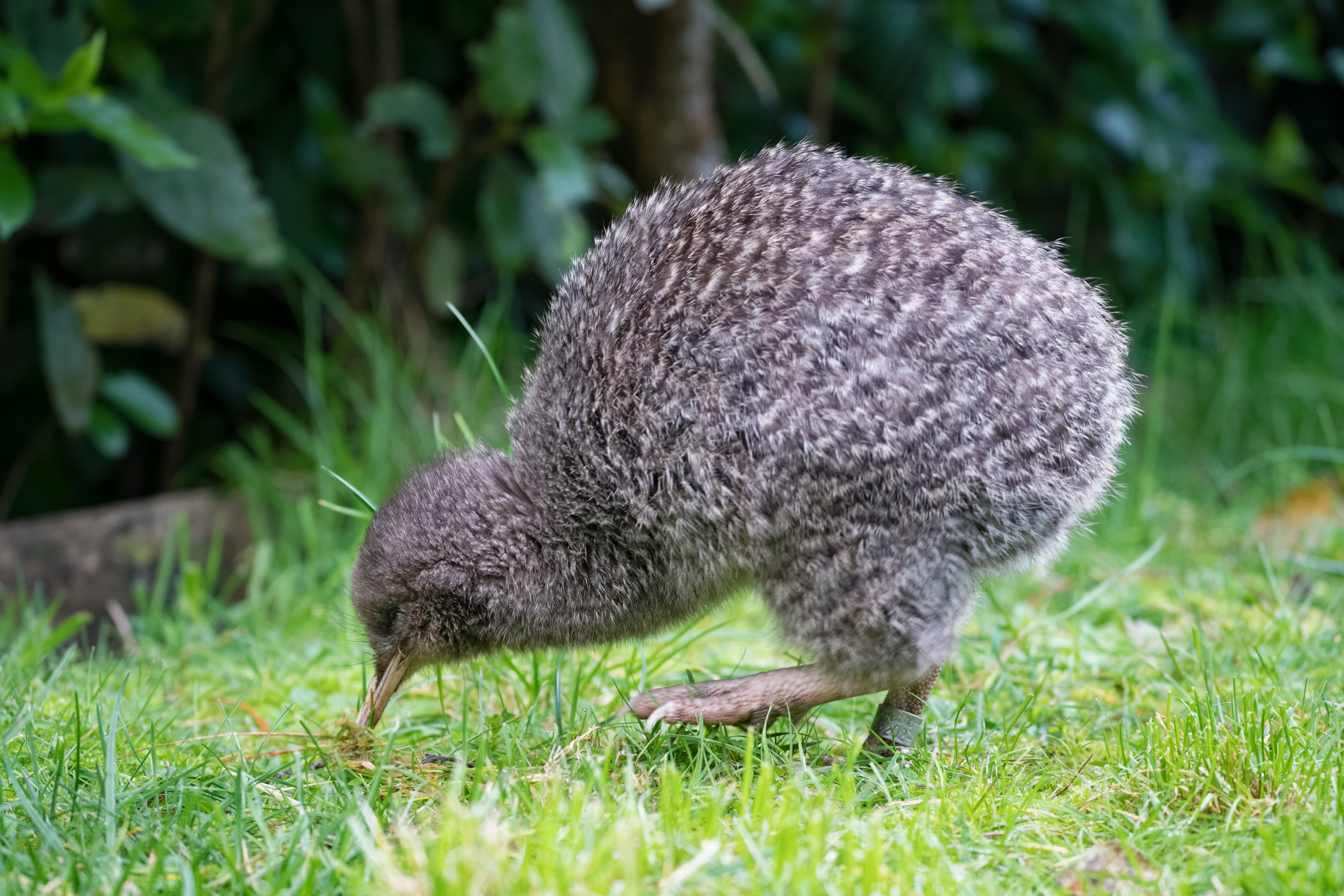
- Foraging at Zealandia wildlife sanctuary, Wellington

Conservation status
- Near Threatened (IUCN 3.1)

Scientific classification
- Kingdom: Animalia
- Phylum: Chordata
- Class: Aves
- Infraclass: Palaeognathae
- Order: Apterygiformes
- Family: Apterygidae
- Genus: Apteryx
- Species: A. owenii

Binomial name
- Apteryx owenii Gould, 1847

Subspecies
- A. o. owenii Gould, 1847 South Island little spotted kiwi; †A. o. iredalei (Mathews, 1935) North Island little spotted kiwi
- The distribution of little spotted kiwi. Predator-free islands: 1. Hen Island; 2. Tiritiri Matangi Island; 3. Red Mercury Island; 4. Motuihe Island; 5. Kāpiti Island; 6. Long Island; 7. Anchor Island; 8. Chalky Island; Mainland: A. Shakespear Open Sanctuary B. Cape Sanctuary C. Zealandia D. Brook Waimarama Sanctuary E. Adams Wilderness Area

Synonyms
- List: Kiwi owenii (Gould, 1847); Stictapteryx owenii (Gould, 1847); Stictapteryx owenii owenii (Gould, 1847); Apteryx mollis Potts, 1873; Apteryx fusca Rowley, 1875; Pseudapteryx gracilis Lydekker, 1891; Apteryx oweni occidentalis Rothschild, 1893; Apteryx occidentalis Rothschild, 1893; Apteryx australis occidentalis Rothschild, 1893; Stictapteryx owenii iredalei Mathews, 1935

= Little spotted kiwi =

Species of flightless bird

The Little spotted kiwi (Apteryx owenii), also known as Little grey kiwi or Kiwi pukupuku, is a small flightless bird in the kiwi family, Apterygidae. It is the smallest of the five kiwi species, at about 0.9 to 1.9 kg (2–4 1/4 lb), about the size of a bantam. It is endemic to New Zealand, and in pre-European times occurred in both main islands, but is now mainly restricted to a number of small offshore islands and mainland reserves protected by pest-exclusion fences.

The little spotted kiwi was on the brink of extinction when a conservation effort took place 100 years ago. Five individuals were translocated from the South Island to Kapiti Island. Today, the Kapiti Island population has grown, with around 1200 birds. They were considered extinct on the mainland, with no sightings since 1978, until their rediscovery in the wild in 2025.

== Taxonomy ==
The little spotted kiwi is a ratite and belongs to the Apterygiformes order, and the Apterygidae family. The genus name Apteryx means 'without wings' and the species is named owenii after Sir Richard Owen. Only the nominate subspecies A. o. owenii survives.

The little spotted kiwi was first described in 1847 by John Gould from a specimen obtained by Frederick Strange and sent to England. The locality is not recorded but it probably came from Nelson or Marlborough. In 1873, Henry Potts published an account of its habitats, and about this time specimens were collected in South Westland and sent to England. A specimen described as Apteryx occidentalis in 1893 is often considered a junior synonym of this species, but a study in 2002 indicated this may be a hybrid between Apteryx australis and Apteryx owenii.

There is a subspecies called Apteryx owenii iredalei, from the North Island, but its status as a subspecies is not universally accepted as valid. More commonly known as the North Island little spotted kiwi, it is an extinct subspecies of the little spotted kiwi that was native to the North Island, New Zealand. It was described by Gregory Mathews in 1935. Most subsequent authors do not recognise it or any other subspecies of Apteryx owenii. The North Island little spotted kiwi went extinct sometime in the late 19th century for unknown reasons; most likely from introduced invasive species such as stoats, feral cats, and other related species, or from human activity in the region. Two specimens were collected in the 1880s, being the only known remnants left.

A 2016 study conducted phylogenetic and population genetic analyses of the genus Apteryx. A Bayesian phylogeny using 1,710 base pairs of mtDNA for 203 individuals (including Holocene-aged fossil kiwi) showed that all five recognized species of kiwi are reciprocally monophyletic. The phylogeny also showed extensive differentiation between extant populations within A. australis and A. mantelli as well as fossil populations in A. australis, A. owenii and A. rowi. The researchers generated the following species tree of the five recognized species of kiwi in two clades (spotted and brown) with all divergence events having occurred within the last 8 million years.

- Apteryx (3.85 mya)
  - (0.55 mya)
    - Apteryx owenii
    - Apteryx maxima
  - (1.56 mya)
    - - (1.12 mya)
        - Apteryx mantelli
        - Apteryx rowi
    - Apteryx australis

== Description ==
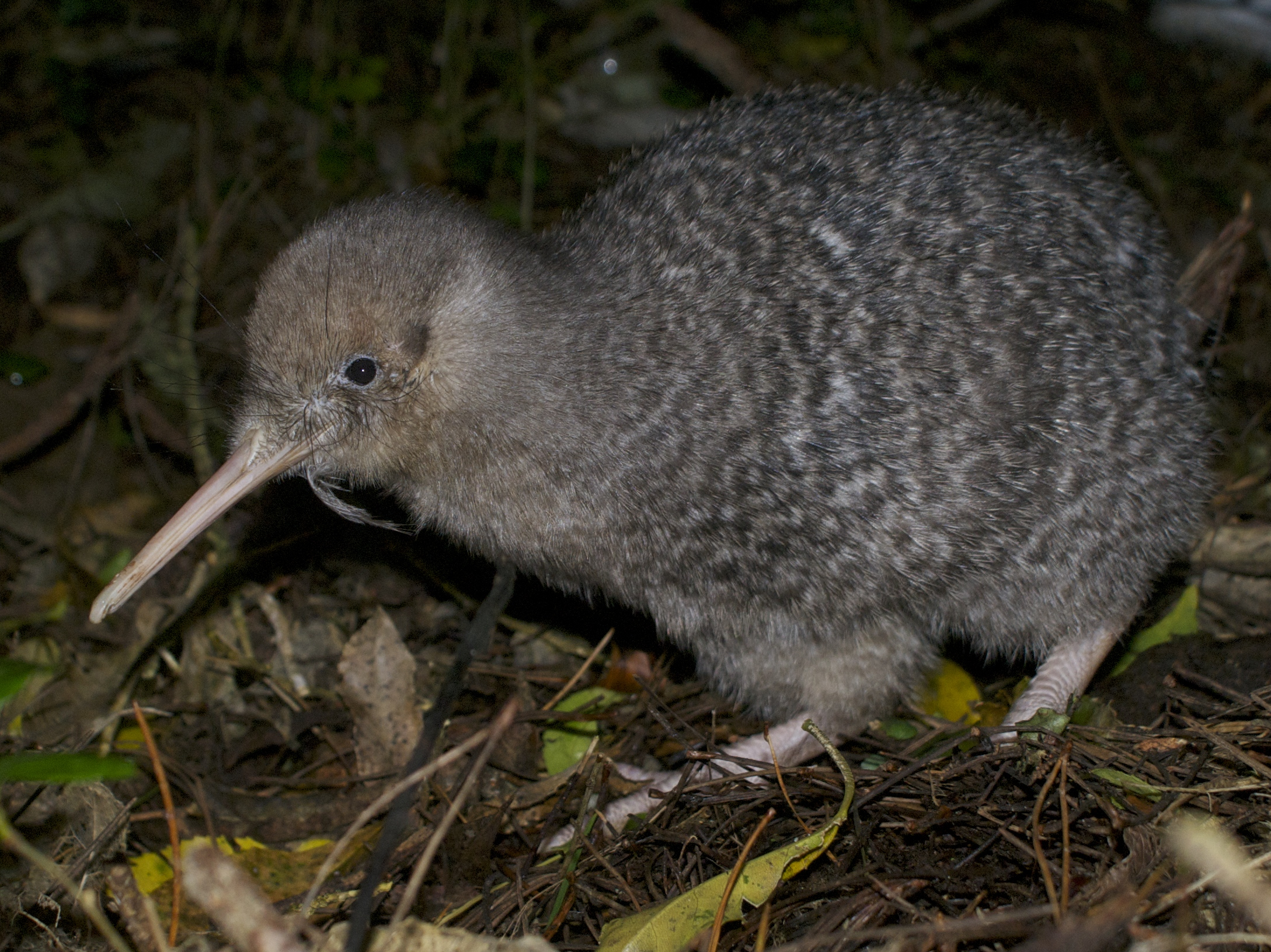
Juvenile at Zealandia wildlife sanctuary

The little spotted kiwi has a length of 35 to 45 cm (14–18 in) and the weight of the male is 0.88 to 1.36 kg (1 lb 15 oz – 3 lb 0 oz) and the female weighs 1 to 1.95 kg (2 1/4–4 1/4 lb), making it the smallest species of kiwi. Their feathers are pale-mottled grey, with fine white mottling, and are shaggy looking. They lack aftershafts and barbules. They have large vibrissae feathers around the gape. They lack a tail, but have a small pygostyle. Their bill is ivory-coloured and long and their legs are pale. Albinism in this species has been recorded.

The little spotted kiwi had an obligate louse that parasitised on it, Rallicola pilgrimi. In an example of conservation-induced extinction, all lice were killed when the kiwi were translocated to Kapiti Island. This species is long-lived with a mean life expectancy of 45 years.

== Distribution and habitat ==
Studies on Kapiti Island show that they prefer flax, seral, and older forest habitats. Lower numbers are found in rough grassland and scrub, indicating that either they prefer other habitats or they simply need a larger territory to support themselves in these areas.

== Behaviour ==
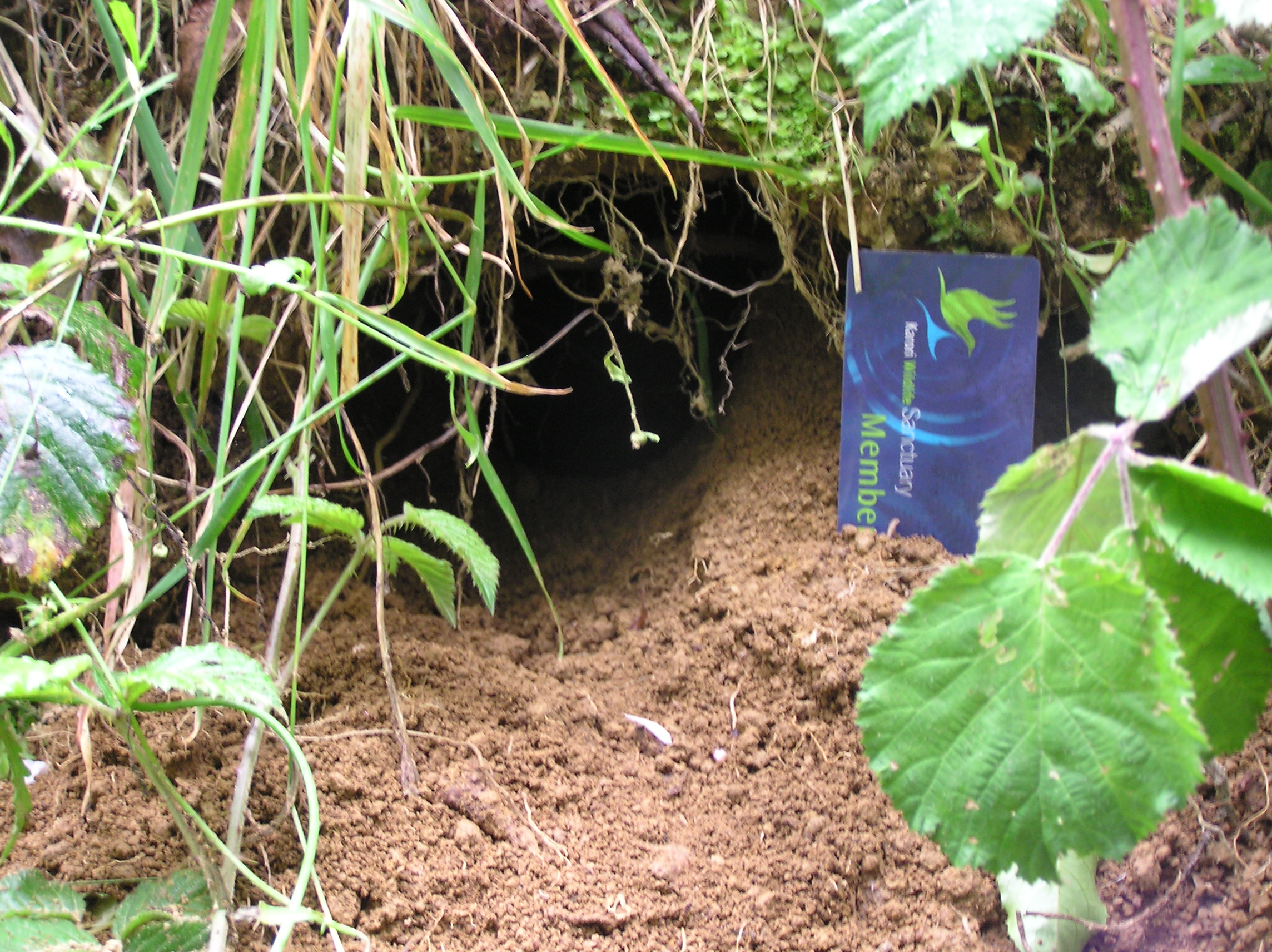
Burrow entrance, Zealandia

Little spotted kiwis eat grubs and other small insects that are found underground, and occasionally eat berries. Earthworms, cockchafer beetle larvae, caterpillars, cranefly larvae, and spiders are their most common foods, with annelids making up the largest percentage of the bird's diet; fruit of the hinau tree is also commonly consumed.

As they cannot fly and their eyesight is very poor, they depend on a keen sense of smell, long beak and talons for finding food. The birds use their sharp talons and long beak to dig into the ground and then probe its long beak through the softened ground.

Little spotted kiwi are nocturnal, and will call occasionally each night to advertise its territory and maintain contact with partners; often pairs will duet. They are very territorial, and fight conspecifics with their sharp claws, resulting in many feathers on the ground.

=== Reproduction ===
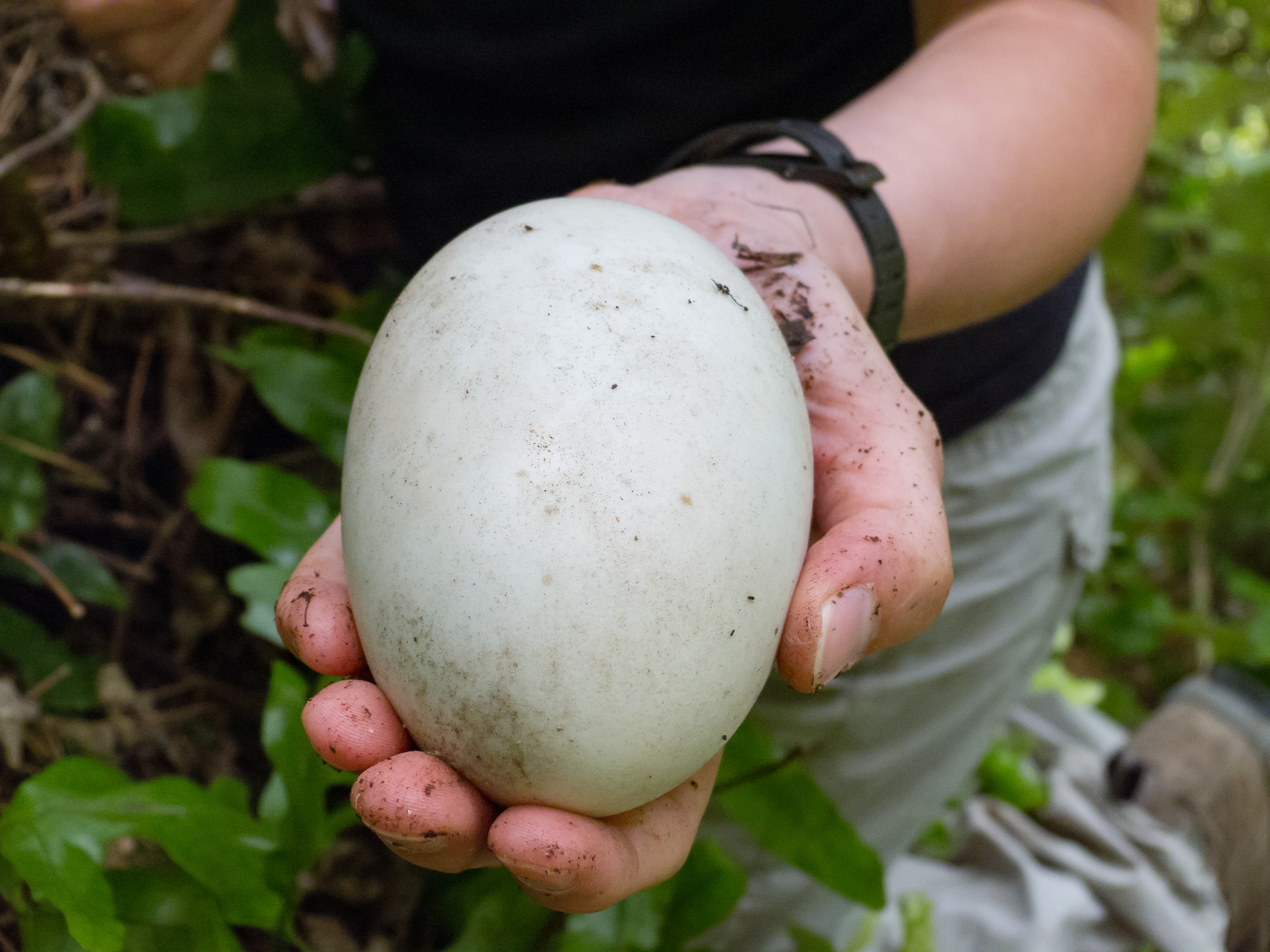
Egg in hand

They nest in an excavated burrow, dug by both birds and sometimes lined with plant material. Eggs are laid from July to January. The clutch size is one to two eggs (15% have 2), which are incubated by the male for 63–76 days. Chicks stay in the nest for 2–3 weeks after hatching and require feeding for 4 weeks. The eggs, like in all kiwis, are very large for body size; representing around 25% of the female's body weight, being 10.5–11.3 cm (4.1–4.4 in) in length and 6.8–7.6 cm (2.7–3.0 in), with an average mass of 301 grams.

== Conservation ==
At the time it was described (in the 1840s), the species was common on the western side of the South Island and in Marlborough. A regular trade in skins sprang up and large numbers were collected for European museums. Further, with the advance of European settlement, birds were killed by prospectors and others for food, and their attendant dogs and cats took their toll.

The species was extinct on the North Island by 1938 when the last four South Island birds were moved from d'Urville Island to the population that had been established on Kapiti Island. After they were released on Kapiti Island, they were also moved to Red Mercury Island, Hen Island, Tiritiri Matangi Island, Chalky Island, and Long Island in the Queen Charlotte Sound.

In 2000, about 20 little spotted kiwis were released into Zealandia. This was the first time since the 19th century that little spotted kiwis could be found on the mainland of the North Island. In 2015, 20 kiwis were translocated from Kapiti Island to Anchor Island.

As the smallest species of kiwi, they would be very vulnerable to the main kiwi predators like cats, dogs, and stoats, if not mostly restricted to several off-shore island reserves (mainly Kapiti Island) which are mostly free of introduced predators. The little spotted kiwi's conservation status is listed as "range restricted" by Save the Kiwi, with a growing population. Formerly classified as "vulnerable" by the IUCN, it was suspected to be more numerous than generally assumed. Following the evaluation of its population size, this was found to be correct, and it was consequently downlisted to "near threatened" status in 2008 as, although not rare, its small range puts it at risk. The lack of predators, apart from weka, is important to its increasing numbers. It has an occupancy range of 340 km^{2} (130 sq mi), and a population of 1,500 mature individuals was estimated in 2022.

In May 2025, 40 birds (20 males and 20 females) were translocated from Kapiti Island to the Brook Waimārama Sanctuary in Nelson, the largest fenced sanctuary in the South Island. The last known population to have lived in the region disappeared nearly a century prior.

In July, two little spotted kiwi were rediscovered on the mainland (outside of a fenced sanctuary) for the first time since 1978, following a tip-off from a hunter. A female and male bird were found in the Adams Wilderness Area in the South Island's West Coast Region.

A translocation of little spotted kiwi from Kapiti Island to Ao-ata-te-pō / Cooper Island is planned to take in 2028, where a trapping program has been carried out by tourist company RealNZ since 2015.

Breeding population and trends
Location	Population	Date	Trend
Hen Island	50	2012	Increasing
Kapiti Island	~ 1200	2012	Stable
Red Mercury Island	70	2012	Increasing
Long Island	50	2012	Increasing
Tiritiri Matangi	80	2012	Increasing
Zealandia Wildlife Sanctuary	120	2012	Increasing
Motuihe Island	30	2012	Stable
Anchor Island	20	2015	Increasing
Chalky Island	50	2012	Stable
Total (New Zealand)	~ 1670	—	—

== General and cited references ==
- BirdLife International (2008a). "Little Spotted Kiwi – BirdLife Species Factsheet". Data Zone.
- BirdLife International (2008b). "What's New (2008)". IUCN RedList. Archived from the original on 28 August 2007.
- Davies, S.J.J.F. (2003). "Kiwis". In Hutchins, Michael (ed.). Grzimek's Animal Life Encyclopedia. Vol. 8 Birds I: Tinamous and Ratites to Hoatzins (2nd ed.). Farmington Hills, MI: Gale Group. pp. 89–90, 92–93. ISBN 0-7876-5784-0.
- Gotch, A.F. (1995) [1979]. "Kiwis". Latin Names Explained. A Guide to the Scientific Classifications of Reptiles, Birds & Mammals. London: Facts on File. p. 181. ISBN 0-8160-3377-3.
- "Little spotted kiwi". Save the Kiwi.
