= Carrick River =

- Route of Carrick River
- Mouth of Carrick River Carrick River (South Island) Carrick River (New Zealand)

Location
- Country: New Zealand

Physical characteristics
- Source: Dark Cloud Range
  - coordinates: 45°49′31″S 166°49′25″E
- Mouth
  - location: Te Korowhakaunu / Kanáris Sound
  - coordinates: 45°56′47″S 166°46′16″E
  - elevation: 0 m (0 ft)
- Length: 21 km (13 mi)

Basin features
- Progression: Carrick River → Islet Cove → Te Korowhakaunu / Kanáris Sound → Taiari / Chalky Inlet → Tasman Sea

The Carrick River is a river of Fiordland, close to the southwesternmost point of New Zealand's South Island. Its course is predominantly southward, and passes through numerous small lakes, most notably Lake Victor, before reaching the sea at the Islet Cove of Te Korowhakaunu / Kanáris Sound.

The river is named after the New Zealand journalist Robert Carrick (1832–1914).

== See also ==
- List of rivers of New Zealand
