= Chalky Island (New Zealand) =

Island in Fiordland, New Zealand

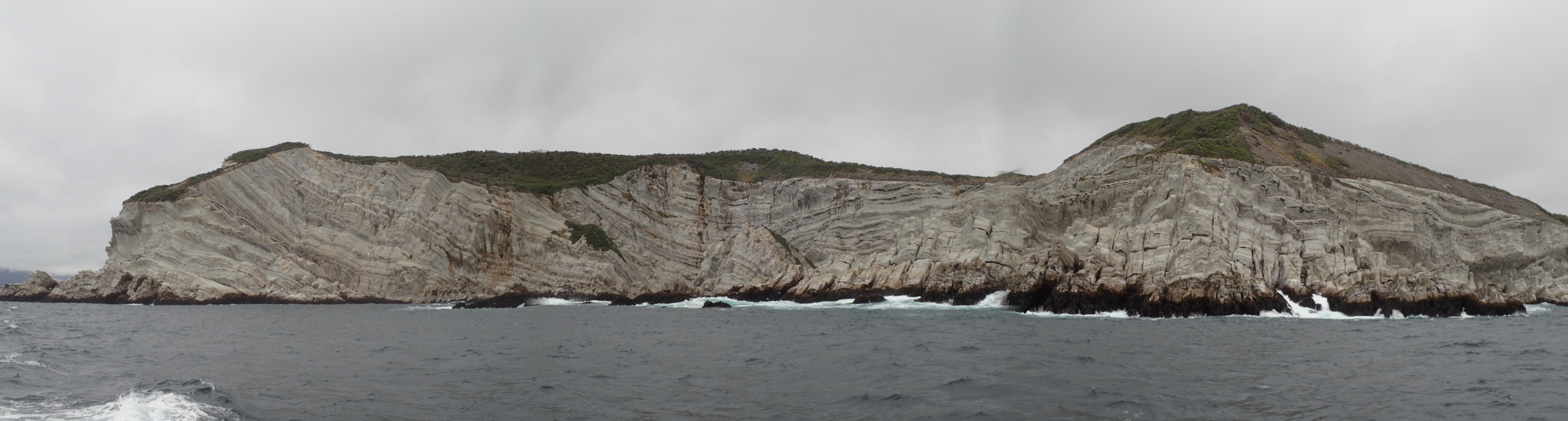
- Chalky Island from the west

- Location within Fiordland Location within New Zealand

Geography
- Location: Fiordland
- Coordinates: 46°03′S 166°31′E
- Area: 5.14 km^{2} (1.98 sq mi)
- Highest elevation: 151 m (495 ft)

Administration
- New Zealand

Demographics
- Population: 0

Chalky Island or Te Kākahu-o-Tamatea is an island in the southwest of New Zealand, and is part of Fiordland National Park. It lies at the entrance to Taiari / Chalky Inlet, next to Rakituma / Preservation Inlet, at the southwestern tip of the South Island, 10 kilometres (6 mi) northwest of Puysegur Point, 15 kilometres (9 mi) southeast of West Cape, and 140 kilometres (87 mi) west of Invercargill. Chalky Island is one of the predator-free islands that is part of the Fiordland Islands restoration programme. The programme's focus is to eradicate pests and translocate native species.

The island was known to Māori as te kākahu-o-Tamatea (the cloak of Tamatea), as, according to oral tradition, it was the place where the explorer Tamatea spread his cloak out to dry after being drenched by the sea. It was first charted by Captain James Cook in 1773, and was a base for sealers in the late 18th and early 19th centuries.

In 1999, Chalky Island became the first nearshore island from which stoats were successfully eradicated by the New Zealand Department of Conservation, and it is now free of mammalian predators and is used as a bird sanctuary. Until 2005 it was one of only four refuges of the only flightless native parrot, the critically endangered kākāpō, and is still a kākāpō refuge. Other threatened endemic birds transferred to the island since the eradication of stoats include tīeke (South Island saddleback), mōhua (yellowhead), little spotted kiwi, and orange-fronted kākāriki. The Te Kakahu skink is endemic to the island. Dolphins, orcas, and southern right whales are sometimes seen in the bay.

== Kākāpō ==
In 2003, the last five kākāpō held on Maud island were transferred to Chalky Island. The group was composed of four male kākāpō and one female.

Several kākāpō were translocated to Chalky Island in 2003 by the New Zealand Department of Conservation. Kākāpō were held on the island for three years until stoat eradication on nearby Anchor Island could be completed.

Eight female kākāpō were transferred from Chalky Island to Codfish Island / Whenua Hou in July 2004. All kākāpō on Chalky island and Pearl Island were later translocated to Anchor Island from June to September 2005, after stoats were eradicated from Anchor Island.

Male kākāpō were reintroduced to the island by the Kākāpō Recovery Team in 2010. Female kākāpō were later introduced in May 2020 to join the 16 males already there.

In August 2022 a single male stoat managed to swim to the island. New Zealand's Department of Conservation (DOC) deemed it a major threat to the island's kākāpō and launched a massive operation to eradicate it, involving trapping experts, dogs, trail cameras, helicopters and boats. The operation cost nearly half a million NZ dollars (around US$300,000) and took eight months before the stoat was finally trapped and killed. DOC defended the high cost, stating that the alternative would have been flying the kākāpō out of the island, with a cost amounting in millions.

== See also ==
- New Zealand outlying islands
- List of islands of New Zealand
- List of islands
- Desert island
