= Great Island (New Zealand) =

Island in Fiordland, New Zealand

- Location within New Zealand

Geography
- Location: Fiordland
- Coordinates: 45°59′30″S 166°34′0″E
- Area: 7.36 km^{2} (2.84 sq mi)
- Highest elevation: 185 m (607 ft)

Administration
- New Zealand

Demographics
- Population: 0

Great Island is an island in the southwest of New Zealand, and is part of Fiordland National Park. It lies in Taiari / Chalky Inlet, north of Chalky Island and contains two small lakes, Lake Dobson and Lake Esau.

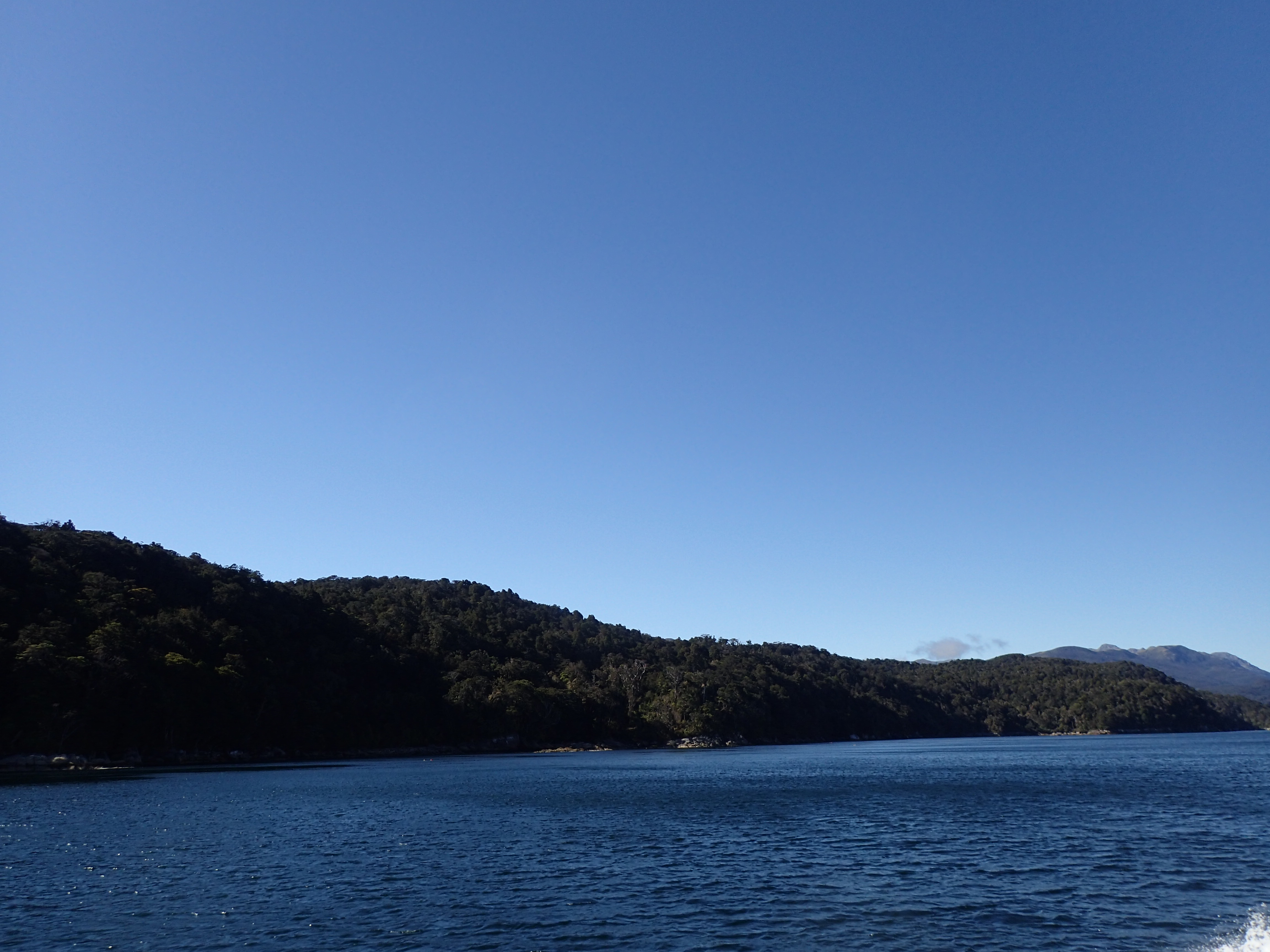
Great Island, Chalky Inlet, From the SouthEast

The island is free of possums, and is currently the site for a trial of self-resetting stoat traps. Although the island's close proximity to the mainland makes it prone to stoat re-invasion, it is an important potential buffer island protecting the pest-free islands south of it. There are plans for a further pest control project on the island focusing on rats.

== See also ==
- New Zealand outlying islands
- List of islands of New Zealand
- List of islands
- Desert island
