= Parrots of New Zealand =

Types of species

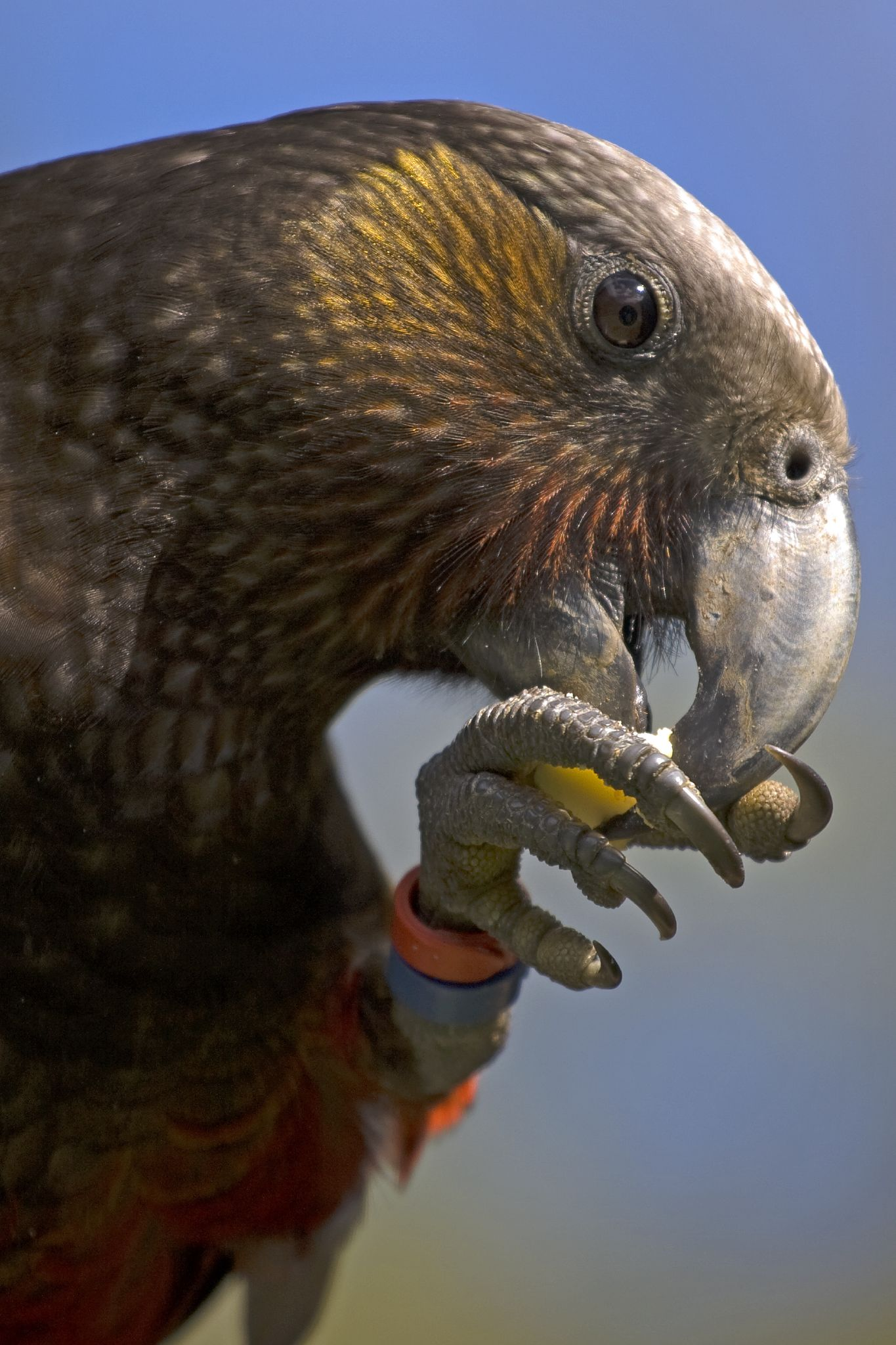
North Island kākā

New Zealand is geographically isolated, and originally lacked any mammalian predators, hence parrots evolved to fill habitats from the ground dwelling kākāpō to the alpine dwelling kea as well as a variety of forest species. The arrival of Māori, then European settlers with their attendant animals, habitat destruction and even deliberate targeting, has resulted in their numbers plummeting. Today one species is on the brink of extinction and three other species range from Vulnerable to Critically Endangered, all impacted by invasive species. Further parrot species were not introduced by acclimatisation societies, but occasional releases, both deliberate and accidental, have resulted in self-sustaining populations of some Australian species. New Zealand was identified among the highest priority countries for parrot conservation in the world, due to its parrot diversity, endemism, threats, and having more threatened parrot species than expected.

== Endemic species ==
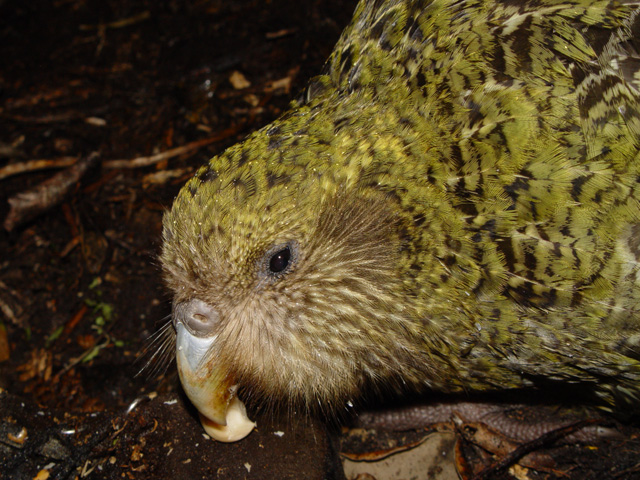
Endemic kākāpō

Apart from the occasional bird blown in from Australia, all the parrot species naturally occurring in New Zealand are found nowhere else (endemic). There are nine surviving parrot species endemic to New Zealand.

The mainland species are the kea (Nestor notabilis), the New Zealand kākā (Nestor meridionalis), the kākāpō (Strigops habroptilus), and three species of kākāriki: the yellow-crowned parakeet (Cyanoramphus auriceps), the red-crowned parakeet (Cyanoramphus novaezelandiae) and the orange-fronted parakeet (Cyanoramphus malherbi). Several subspecies of kākāriki are endemic on New Zealand’s outlying islands.

The other New Zealand parrot species are the Chatham kākā (Nestor chathamensis), which is extinct, the Chatham parakeet (Cyanoramphus forbesi) from the Chatham Islands, the Antipodes parakeet (Cyanoramphus unicolor), and the Reischek's parakeet (Cyanoramphus hochstetteri) endemic to Antipodes Islands.

The total kākāpō population is 325 (as of 2026). It is being carefully managed to save it from extinction. The orange-fronted parakeet is Critically Endangered, the kākā is listed as Vulnerable, and the kea is Endangered.

== Extinct species ==
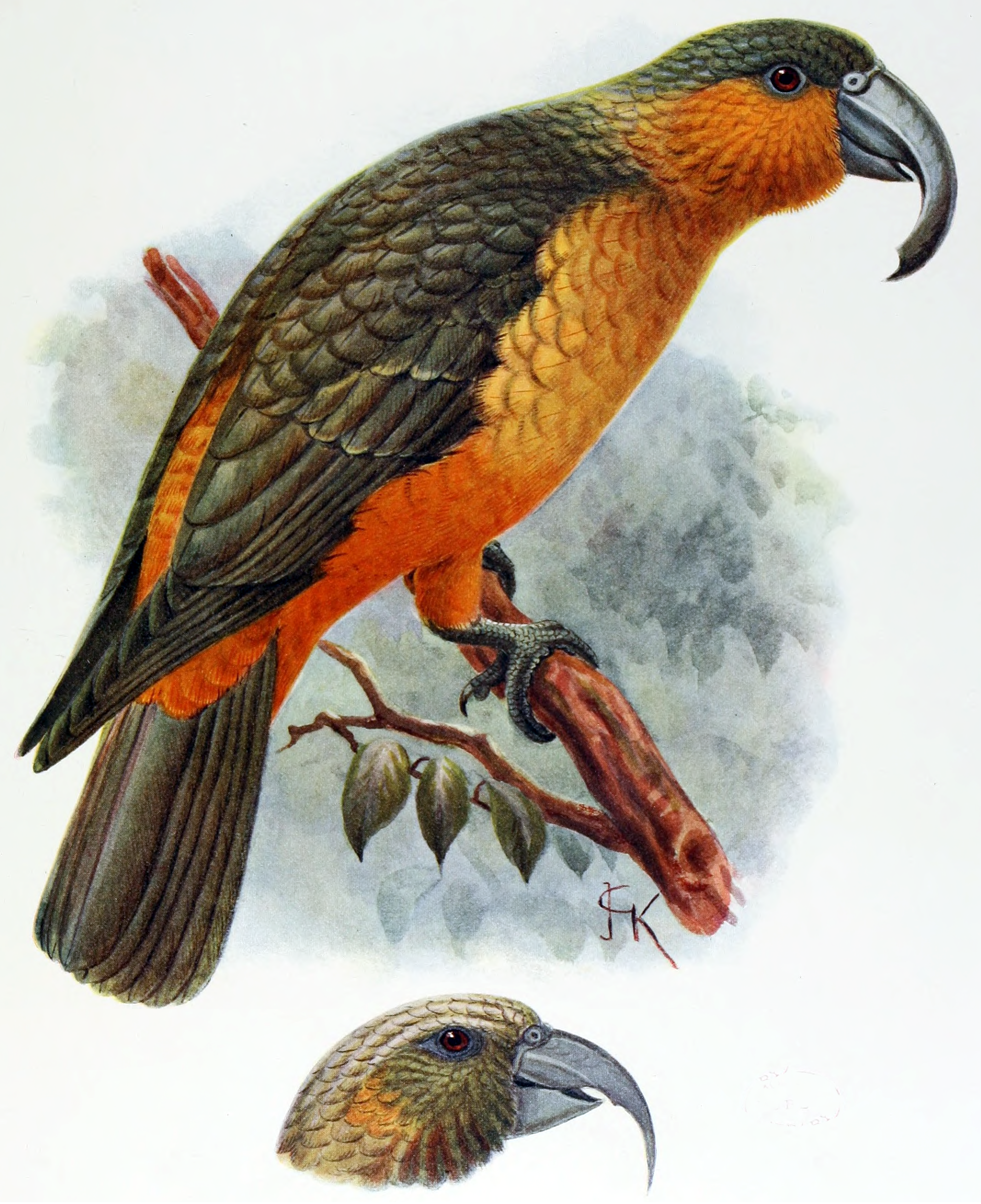
Extinct Norfolk kākā

An unidentified parakeet lived on Campbell Island, but was extinct by 1840, so had disappeared before it could be scientifically described. The Chatham Island kākā (Nestor chathamensis) was extinct by 1550–1700, so is only described from sub-fossil remains, and the Norfolk Island kākā (Nestor productus) was extinct by 1851.

== Introduced species ==
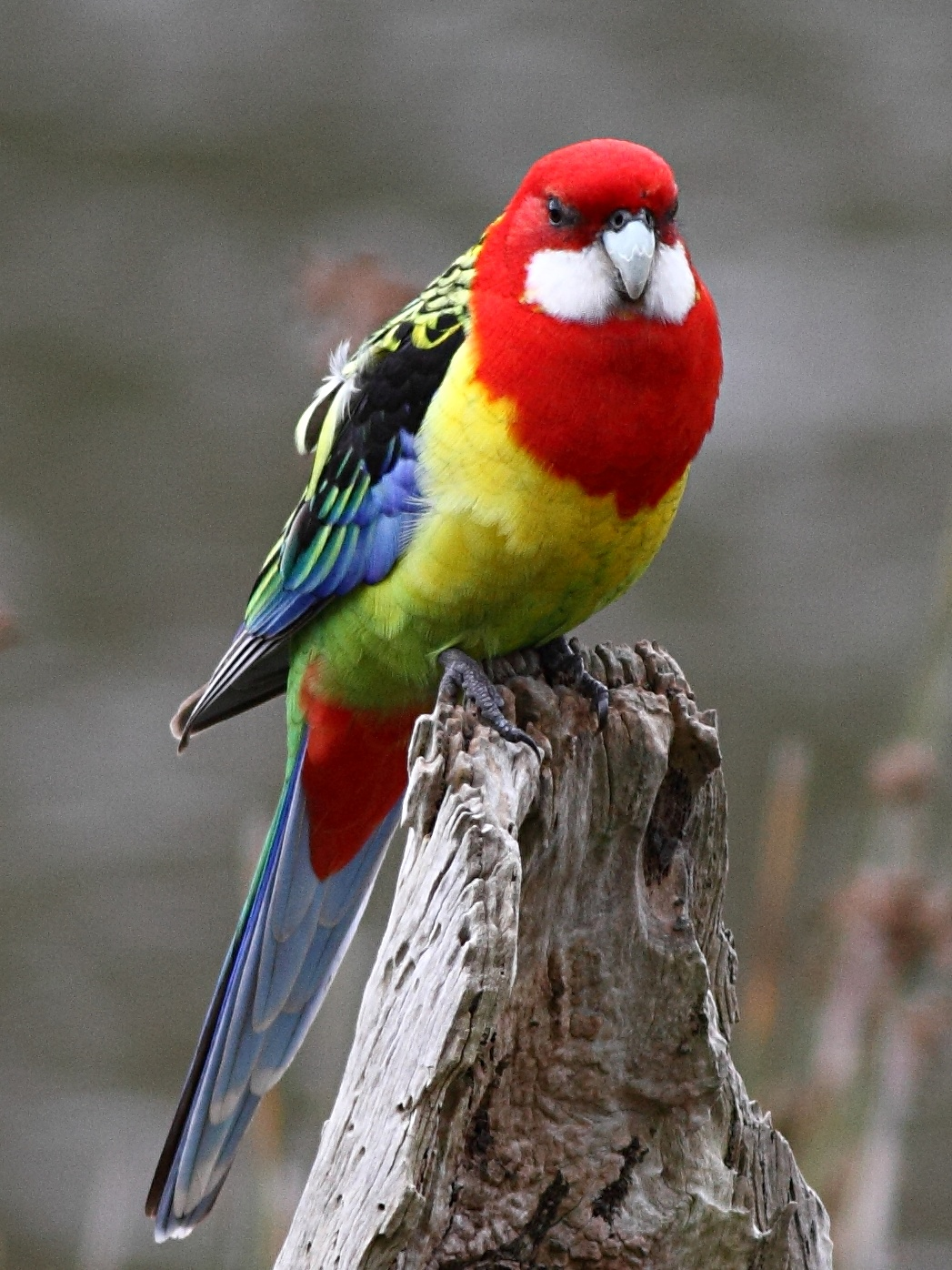
Introduced eastern rosella

Various Australian species have either been deliberately introduced or accidentally released. But only two appear to have significant self-sustaining populations - the eastern rosella (Platycercus eximius) and the sulphur-crested cockatoo (Cacatua galerita). Crimson rosellas (Platycercus elegans) and Galahs (Eolophus roseicapilla) may be present in small numbers.

The eastern rosella can be found in the northern half of the North Island (i.e. north of Taupō), the Taranaki Region north of Mount Taranaki, the Wellington Region, and in the hills around Dunedin. It is reported that an attempt to import eastern rosellas about 1910 was refused by customs, so the birds were released at sea off the Otago Heads resulting in the present Dunedin population. The Auckland population dates from about 1920 and the Wellington one from about 1960. As early as 1928 the rosella was reported as being a pest around Auckland.

The sulphur-crested cockatoo population appears to be result of escapes of captive birds which have built to a total population of fewer than 1000 birds. Feral birds were first seen in the Waitākere Ranges in the early 1900s. There are now populations in the Auckland Region, western Waikato, the Turakina–Rangitikei region, Wellington Region and Banks Peninsula.

Around 1992 an attempt was made by a breeder to establish a wild population of rainbow lorikeets around Auckland. The species was considered a competitor to native species and a threat to horticulture. So in 1999 it was declared an 'unwanted organism' under the Biosecurity Act, and a plan to remove the estimated 200 feral birds was made. Live trapping of the birds was carried out. The population appears under control, and there is an ongoing programme to ensure they do not establish a self-sustaining wild population.
