= Anchor Island =

Island of New Zealand

Native name: Pukenui
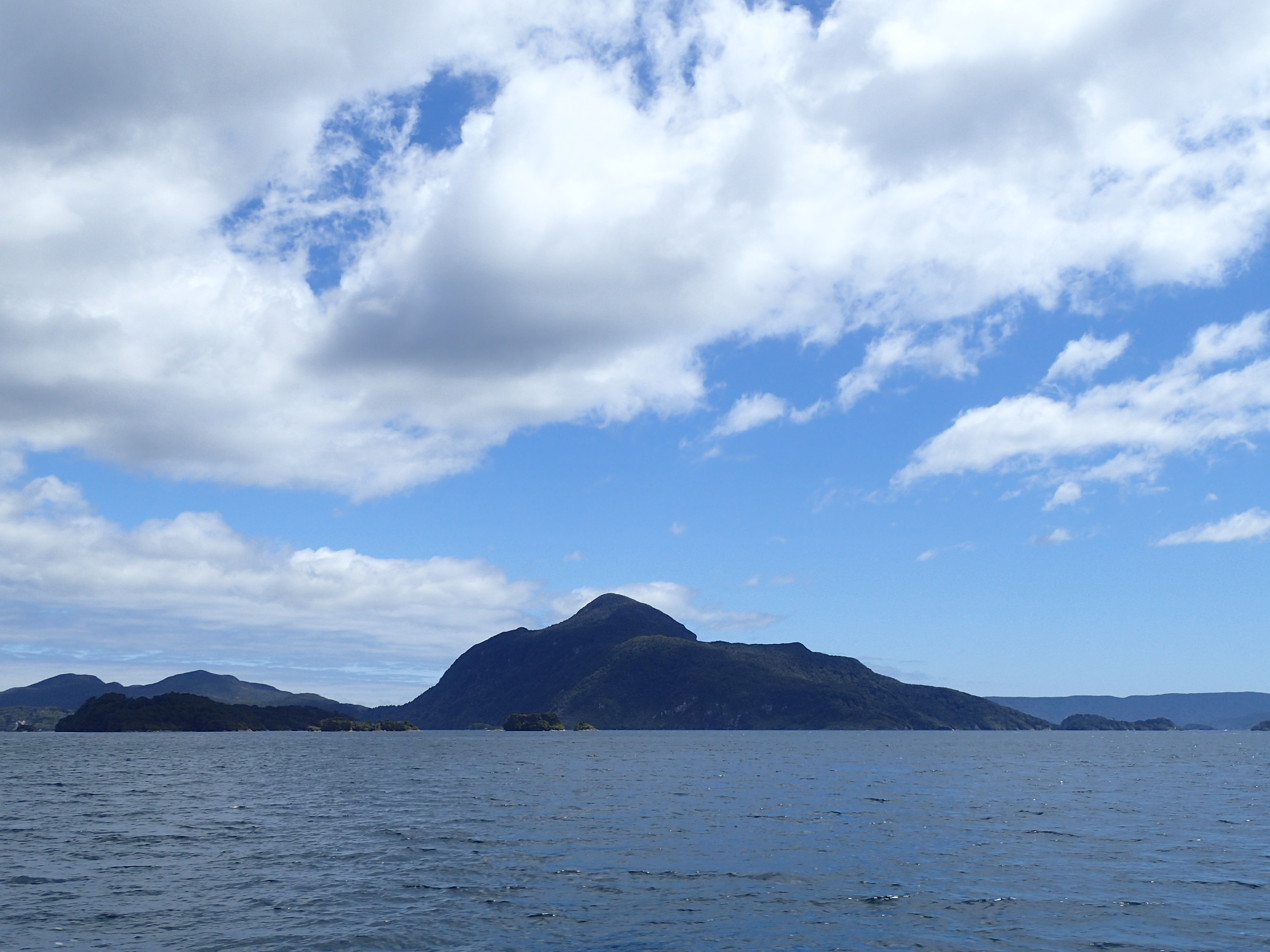
- Anchor Island – from the East

- Location within New Zealand

Geography
- Location: Dusky Sound
- Coordinates: 45°45′30″S 166°31′0″E
- Area: 11.37 km^{2} (4.39 sq mi)
- Highest elevation: 417 m (1368 ft)

Administration
- New Zealand

Demographics
- Population: 0

Anchor Island (Māori: Pukenui) is an island in Dusky Sound in Fiordland.

The New Zealand Ministry for Culture and Heritage gives a translation of "large hill" for Pukenui.

The island was the site of the first anchorage made by HMS Resolution in 1773 during James Cook's second voyage to New Zealand. Cook called the island Anchor Island, and the first anchorage site (which is the point furthest east on the island) was given the name Anchor Point. A small harbour on the southern side of the isl where Cook and his crew at crayfish was dubbed Luncheon Cove.

The island is situated southwest of the much larger Resolution Island in the inlet area of Dusky Sound and surrounded by many smaller islands and contains four small lakes, including Lake Kirirua, the largest lake on an island in Fiordland.

The island is part of the Fiordland National Park and since 2005 is one of few island sanctuaries that are home to the critically endangered kākāpō.

Red deer and stoats had been eradicated between 2001 and 2005, and subsequently endangered endemic birds including tīeke (saddleback), mohua (yellowhead) and kākāpō, have been relocated to the island. The island is one of only nine islands in the area that is completely free of introduced mammalian pests and is 2.5 km (1.6 mi) from the New Zealand mainland, which makes it relatively safe from repeat incursions by stoat and deer.

Anchor Island is one of the predator free islands as part of the Fiordland Islands restoration programme, the programme's focus is to eradicate pests and translocate native species.

== Kākāpō ==
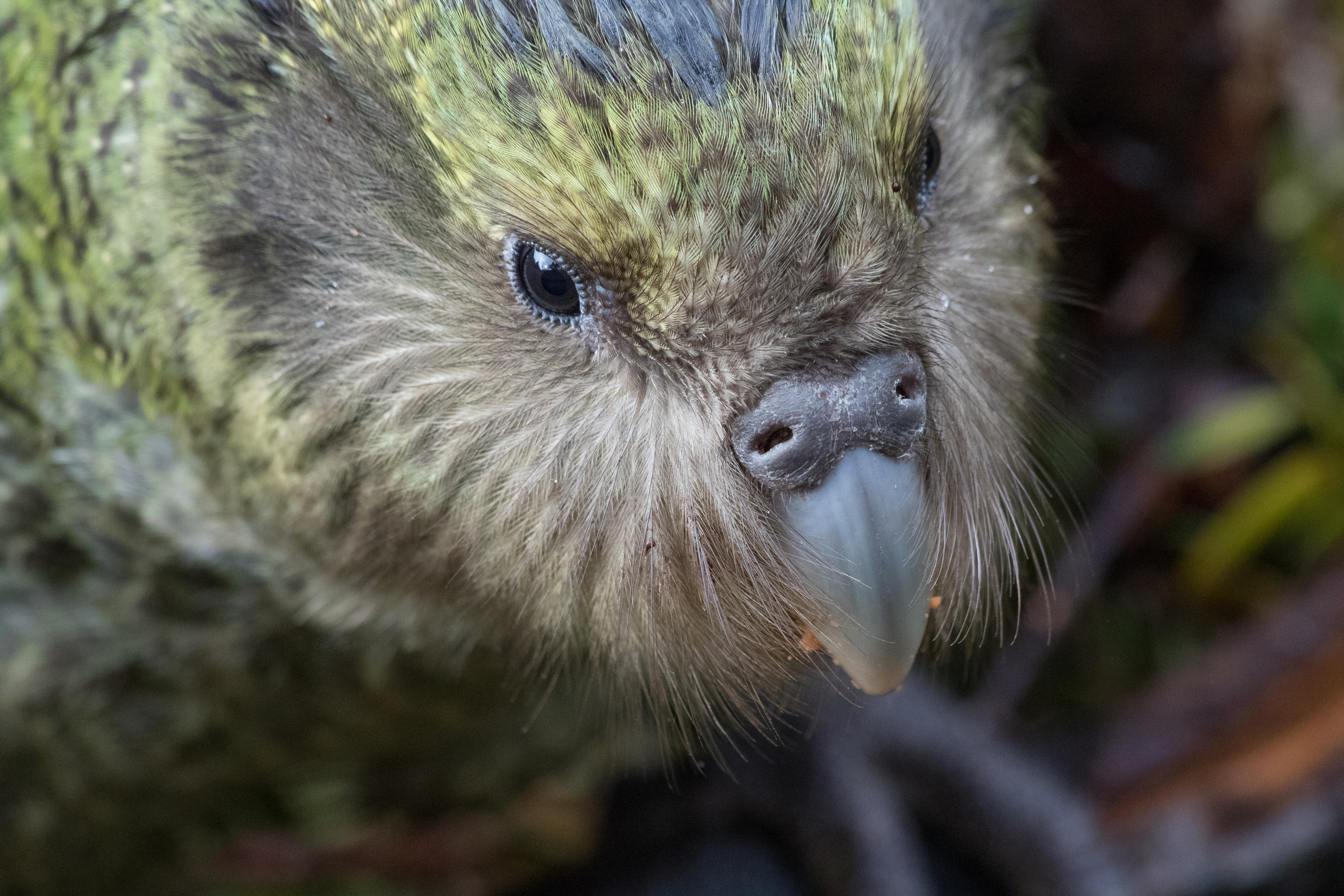
Juvenile kākāpō on Anchor Island in Dusky Sound

Pukenui is home to the endangered species kākāpō. The first kākāpō were transferred to Pukenui in 2005 after stoat eradication in 2001. These birds are managed by the Kākāpō Recovery Team, which is a part of the New Zealand Department of Conservation.

Pukenui has rimu forest, an important food source for the species.

The first known breeding of kākāpō on Pukenui occurred in 2011, leading to two infertile eggs. Kākāpō bred again on the island for the 2016 and 2019 kākāpō breeding seasons. As of 23 January 2022, all mature female kākāpō on the island have bred. Nests have been found for 17 of the 21 birds.

== See also ==
- List of islands of New Zealand
- List of islands
- Desert island
