= Stoat in New Zealand =

Introduced ecological threat

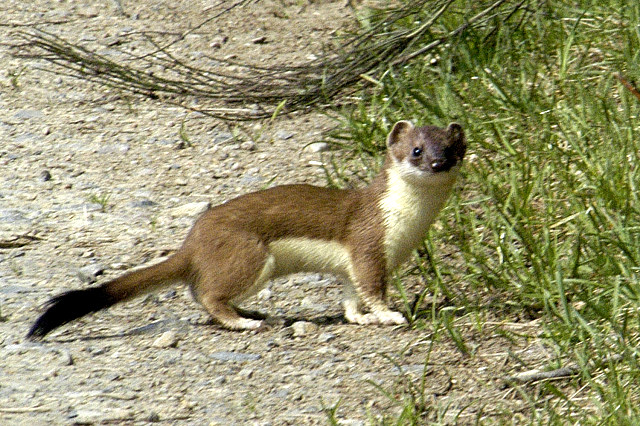
A stoat in the Ardennes in Belgium, within its natural range

The stoat (Mustela erminea) was introduced into New Zealand to control introduced rabbits and hares, but turned out to be a major threat to the native bird population. The natural range of the stoat is limited to parts of the Northern Hemisphere. Immediately before human settlement, New Zealand did not have any land-based mammals apart from bats, but Polynesian and European settlers introduced a wide variety of animals. Rarely, in Southland, the fur of stoats has been reported to turn white, being the fur known as ermine, which adorns royal robes.

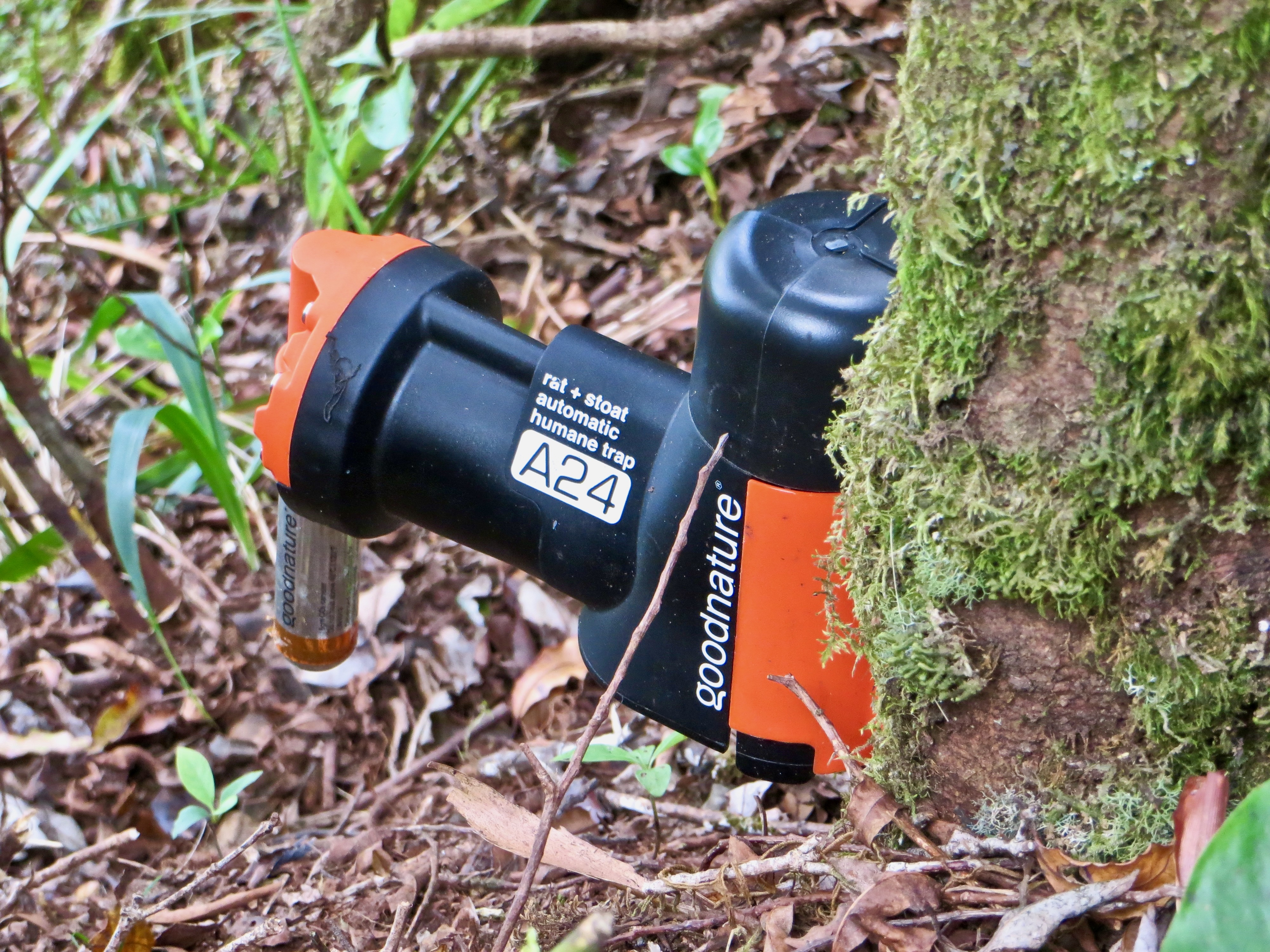
Self-resetting rat and stoat trap

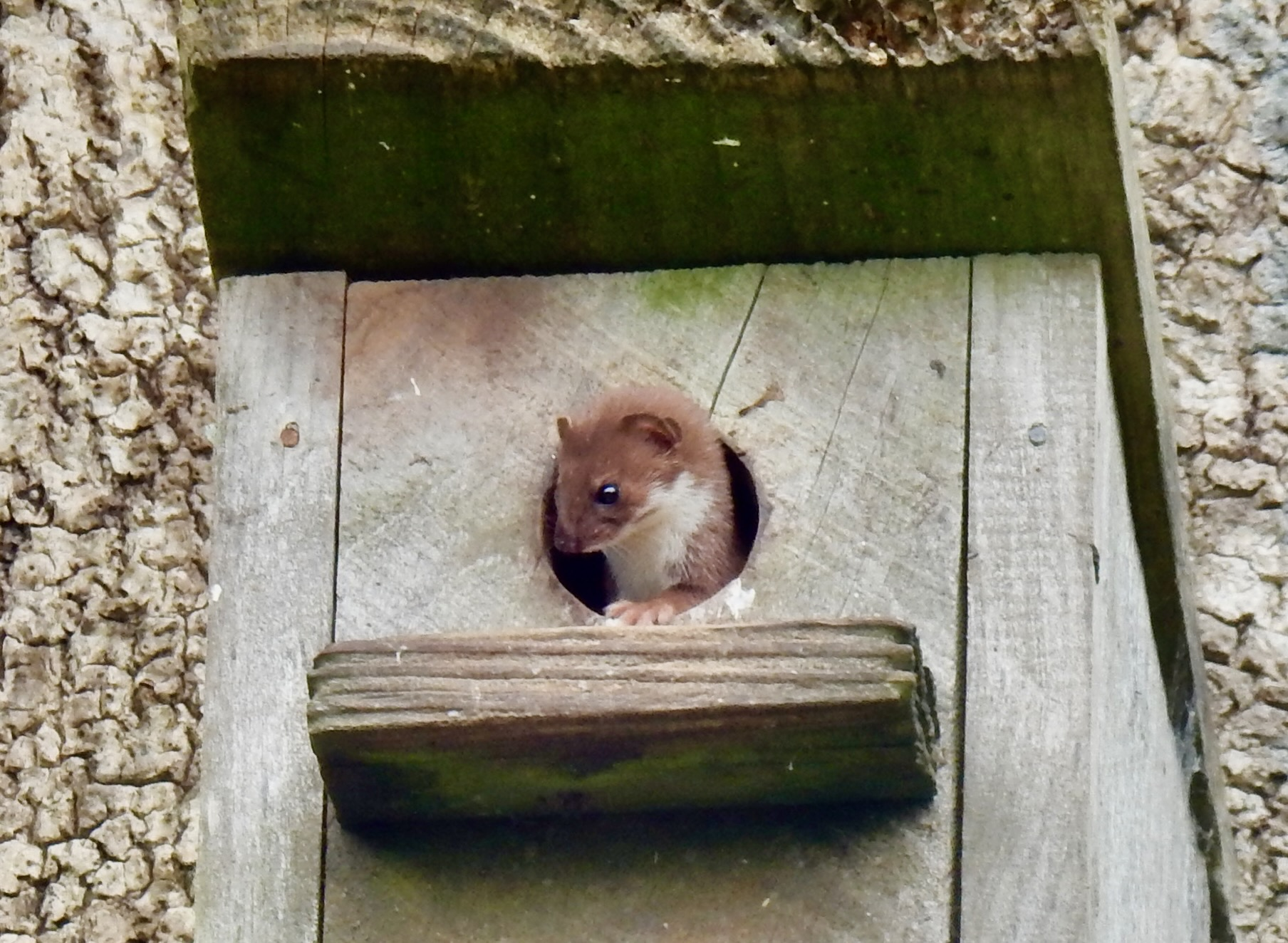
Stoat emerging from a bird nesting box, near Raglan

== Introductions of stoats ==
The rabbit was introduced by European settlers as a food and game animal, and by the 1870s it was becoming a serious threat to the newly developed farming economy. Farmers began demanding the introduction of mustelids (including stoats) to control the rabbit plague. Warnings about the dangers to bird life from stoats were given by scientists in New Zealand and Britain, including the New Zealand ornithologist Walter Buller. The warnings were ignored and stoats began to be introduced from Britain in the 1880s. Within six years, drastic declines in bird populations were noticed.

By 1930 the Auckland Acclimatisation Society was campaigning to end the protection of mustelids and cats.

The translocation efforts of New Zealand's pioneering conservationist Richard Henry were undone when stoats swam to Resolution Island. Stoats were eradicated from Chalky Island and other Fiordland islands in the early 2000s, and scientists assumed that they would be unable to cross a 300 m water barrier, but stoats turned out to be able to reinvade: DNA testing confirmed that stoats regularly swim towards islands in summer, especially in beech mast years, and prefer long coastlines. In December 2010, a stoat was seen on what was thought to be the stoat-free Kapiti Island, and by August the next year the New Zealand Department of Conservation had managed to remove three. It seems unlikely that a stoat could cross the five-kilometre stretch of open sea from the Kapiti Coast but they are accomplished swimmers: in an experiment in a flume tank, a stoat paddled against a moderate current for two hours without stopping, the equivalent of swimming 1.8 km.

== Threat to bird life ==
New Zealand has a high proportion of ground-nesting and flightless birds, due to its long geographical isolation and a lack of mammal predators. Native birds have evolved to fill niches that are occupied by mammals in most other places. Stoats are the greatest threat to these ground-nesting and hole-nesting birds, which have very limited means of escaping stoat predation. In some areas the whio population is now 70% male, from stoats attacking female ducks incubating eggs.

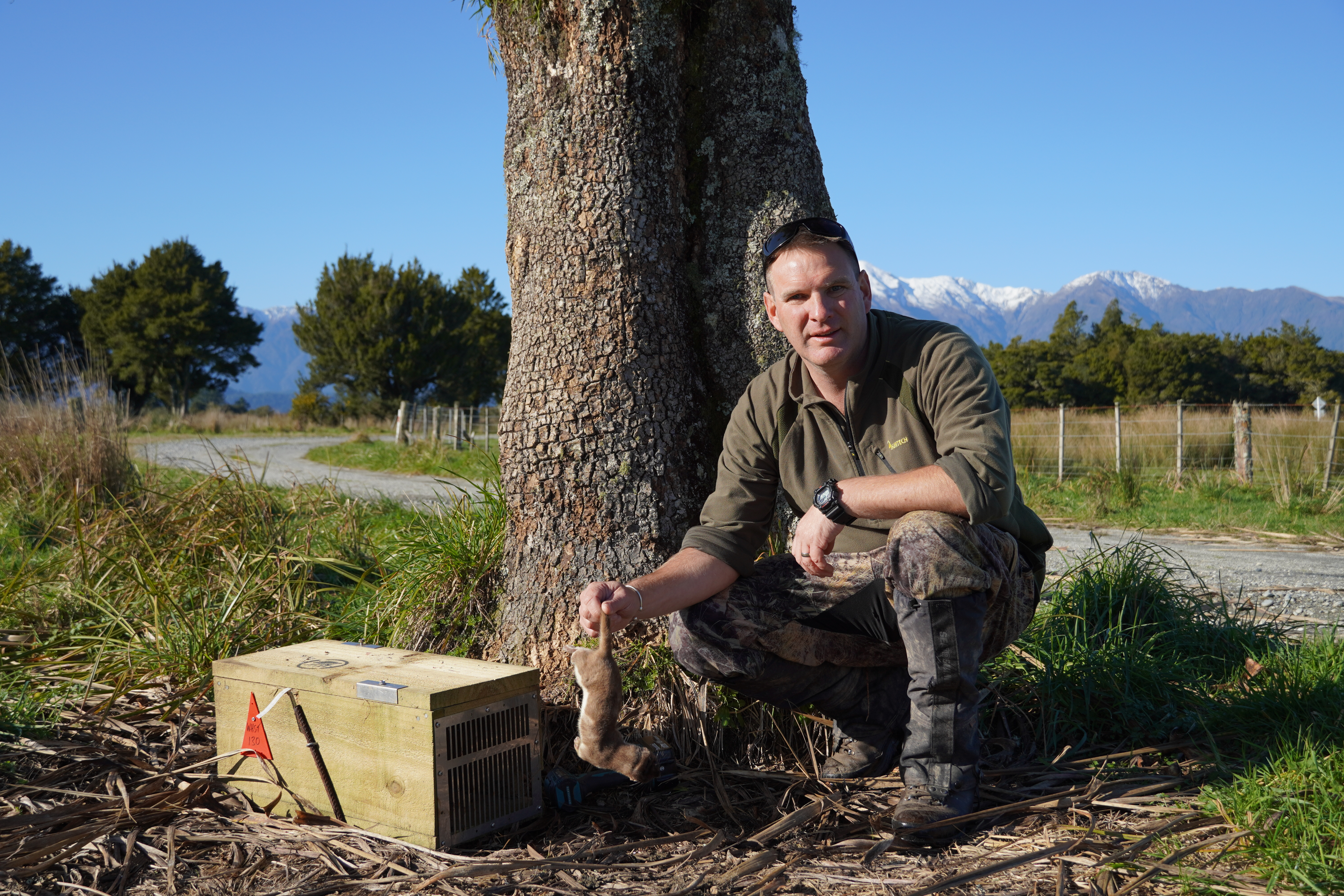
Stoat caught in a trap as part of a predator control initiative at the White Heron Sanctuary at the Waitangiroto Nature Reserve in Whataroa.

In addition to birds, stoats eat insects, mice and rats. During "beech masts", when southern beech trees (Nothofagus species) produce a far greater amount of seed than normal, the stoat population undergoes changes in predation behaviour. With high beech-seed numbers, rats and mice become more plentiful, and the increase in prey encourages stoat breeding. The higher stoat numbers reduce the rodent population and the stoats then prey on birds. For instance, the wild population of the endangered takahē dropped by a third between 2006 and 2007, after a stoat plague triggered by the 2005–2006 mast wiped out more than half the takahē in areas where stoat numbers were not limited by trapping.

== Control measures ==
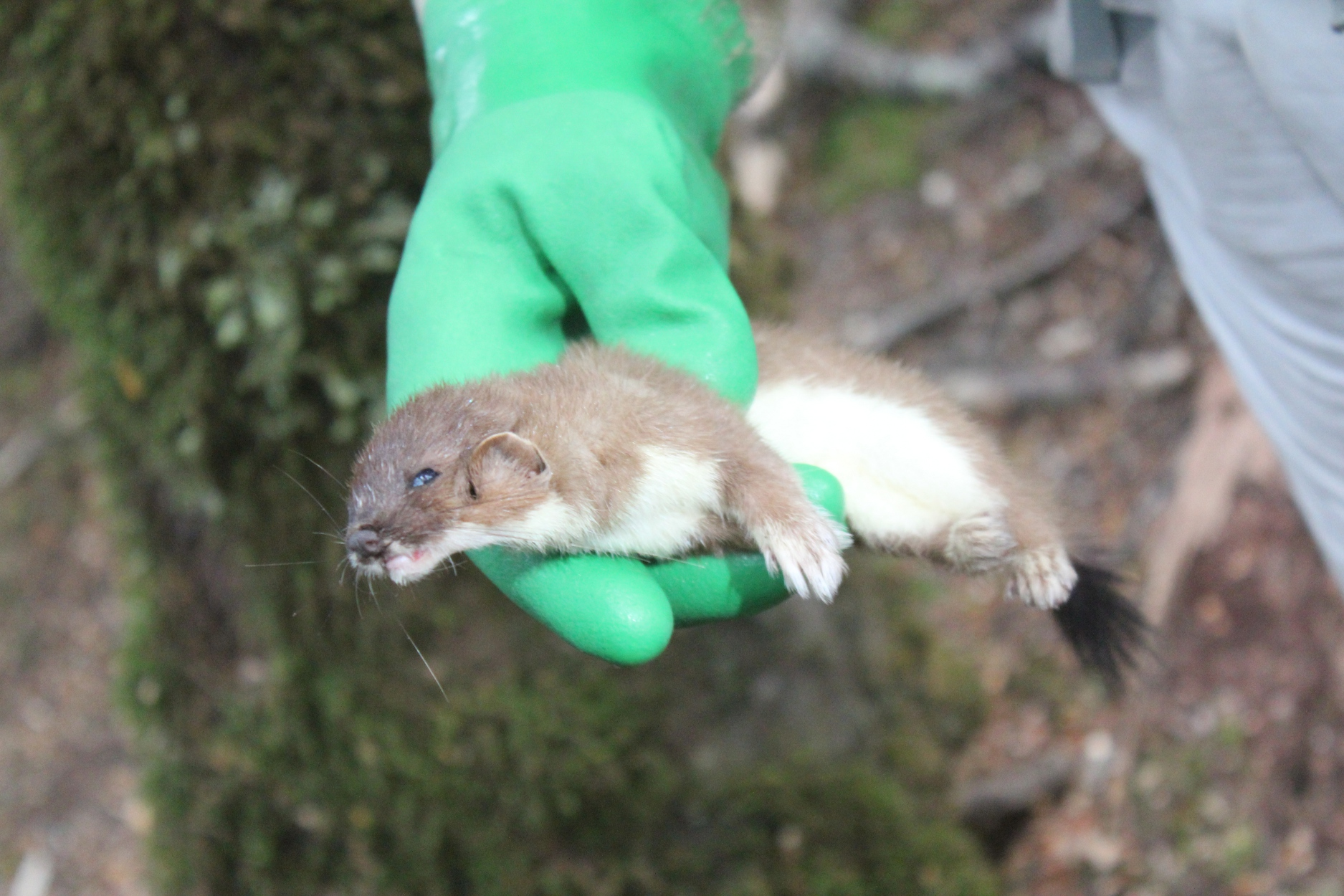
A dead stoat retrieved from a trap in Fiordland

Stoats are difficult to control since they are bait-shy, trap-wary, and have high fecundity. In some areas where there are populations of endangered birds, a programme of stoat-trapping has been implemented. The most common method of trapping is to use a stoat tunnel – a wooden box with a small entrance at one end to allow the stoat to enter. The bait is often an egg and a trap is placed in the tunnel to kill the stoat. Recent trials of a new design of self-resetting stoat traps for remote areas have been encouraging.

"Mainland Islands", protected areas on the mainland of New Zealand that employ intensive control of introduced pests, have stoat trapping on their perimeter. Predator-proof fences, using fine wire-mesh netting, are used to keep stoats out of protected areas. Methods of restricting stoat breeding have also been investigated.

In August 2022 a single male stoat managed to swim to Chalky Island, an important refuge and breeding ground of the critically endangered kākāpō parrot. Deeming it a major threat to the island's native wildlife, New Zealand's Department of Conservation (DOC) launched a massive operation to eradicate it, involving trapping experts, dogs, trail cameras, helicopters and boats. The operation cost around NZ$300,000 and took eight months until the stoat was finally trapped and killed. DOC defended the high cost, stating that the alternative would have been flying the kākāpō out of the island, with a cost amounting in millions.

== Legislation ==
Although stoats were recognised as a potential pest before being introduced into New Zealand, they were given protection as late as 1936. As a means of preventing a loss of biodiversity, there are now severe penalties for introducing stoats into protected areas.

== See also ==
- Conservation in New Zealand
- Birds of New Zealand
- Invasive species in New Zealand
