= Hokitika skink =

Conservation status
- Nationally Critical (NZ TCS)

Scientific classification
- Kingdom: Animalia
- Phylum: Chordata
- Class: Reptilia
- Order: Squamata
- Family: Scincidae
- Subfamily: Eugongylinae
- Genus: Oligosoma
- Species: O. aff. infrapunctatum "Hokitika"

Binomial name
- Oligosoma aff. infrapunctatum "Hokitika"

Species of lizard from Westland District, New Zealand

The Hokitika skink (Oligosoma aff. infrapunctatum "Hokitika") is a poorly-known and critically endangered species of lizard in the family Scincidae (skinks) found only in the Hokitika area on the West Coast of New Zealand.

== Taxonomy and naming ==
In a 2019 revision of the speckled skink (Oligosoma infrapunctatum) complex, Melzer et al. described several new species, including O. salmo and O. albornense from the West Coast. Several other populations were identified as genetically distinct and in need of further taxonomic work, including the cobble skink, the Westport skink, and a population in the region of Hokitika.

A molecular phylogeny established the Hokitika skinks were distinct at the species level, and the sister group to the cobble skink of Granity, 150 km to the north, but were not close relatives of O. newmani (the species found in the northern West Coast) or the Chesterfield/Kapitia skink found on the nearby Hokitika coast. The tag name Oligosoma aff. infrapunctatum "Hokitika" was coined, pending further genetic analysis and a species description.

== Distribution ==
This species is known from three isolated localities on the West Coast of the South Island near Hokitika. Two of its occurrences are sightings of a single individual, and the other is a small population on private land.

== Habitat ==
The Hokitika skink has been found in non-native vegetation, in pasture and grassland on terraces and riverbanks.

== Description ==
The Hokitika skink is 85 mm in snout–vent length, with a blunt snout. Like other members of the O. infrapunctatum species complex, it has a medium-brown back speckled with light and dark scales, and darker lateral bands with toothed margins. It differs from closely related species in its distinctive tooth-like (denticulate) markings around the mouth, and having its belly spots arranged in streaks.

== Conservation ==
In 2015 Department of Conservation (DOC) classified the Hokitika skink as Data Deficient under the New Zealand Threat Classification System, and in 2021 changed its status to Threatened–Nationally Critical, given the possibility of a population decline of 50–70% and the likelihood there are less than 250 individuals remaining.
