= Westport skink =

Conservation status
- Data Deficit (NZ TCS)

Scientific classification
- Kingdom: Animalia
- Phylum: Chordata
- Class: Reptilia
- Order: Squamata
- Family: Scincidae
- Subfamily: Eugongylinae
- Genus: Oligosoma
- Species: O. aff. infrapunctatum "Westport"

Binomial name
- Oligosoma aff. infrapunctatum "Westport"

Species of lizard from near Westport, New Zealand

The Westport skink (Oligosoma aff. infrapunctatum "Westport") is an undescribed species of lizard in the family Scincidae (skinks) known from just a single museum specimen, collected near Westport on the West Coast of New Zealand.

== Taxonomy and naming ==
In a 2019 revision of the speckled skink (Oligosoma infrapunctatum) complex, Melzer et al. described several new species, including O. salmo and O. albornense from the West Coast. Several other populations were identified as genetically distinct and in need of further taxonomic work, including the cobble skink, the Hokitika skink, and a single individual from near Westport.

A molecular phylogeny established the Westport skink was distinct at the species level, 2.9% sequence divergence from its closest relative the Hawke's Bay skink O. auroraensis. Both were sister taxa to the O. aff. infrapunctatum species found in the southern North Island. It was not a close relative of other West Coast species in the complex, such as O. newmani or O. salmo. The tag name Oligosoma aff. infrapunctatum "Westport" was coined, pending further collecting specimens, genetic analysis, and a species description.

== Description ==
The Westport skink is 75 mm (3.0 in) in snout–vent length, with a blunt and rounded snout. The museum specimen is missing part of its tail. Like other members of the O. infrapunctatum species complex, it has a medium-brown back speckled with light and dark scales, and darker lateral bands with toothed margins; the colouring of the preserved specimen may have been different in life. Currently the species can only be distinguished genetically from its close relatives.

== Distribution and habitat ==
This species is known from a single specimen, collected in a lowland habitat near Westport in the late 1990s. Nothing is known of the species' habitat, except that it was collected in Westport, a coastal town in lowland farming country, and likely outside of its natural habitat.

== Conservation ==
Since 2015 the Department of Conservation (DOC) has classified the Westport skink as Data Deficient under the New Zealand Threat Classification System.
