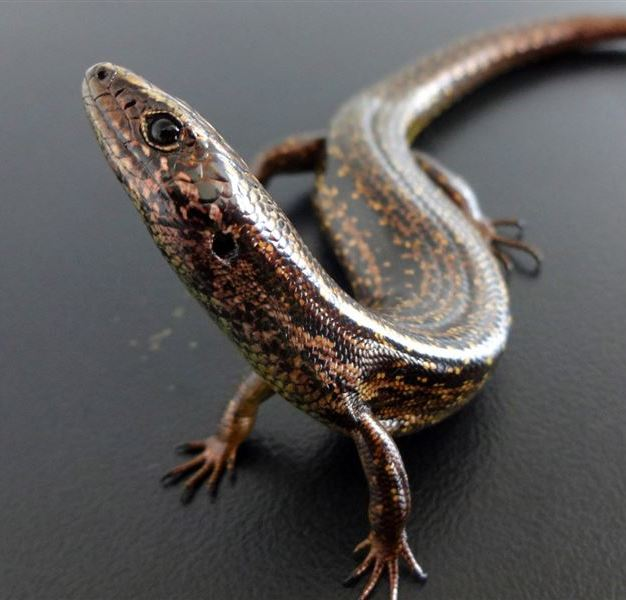

Conservation status
- Nationally Critical (NZ TCS)

Scientific classification
- Kingdom: Animalia
- Phylum: Chordata
- Class: Reptilia
- Order: Squamata
- Family: Scincidae
- Genus: Oligosoma
- Species: O. salmo

Binomial name
- Oligosoma salmo Melzer, Hitchmough, Bell, Chapple, & Patterson, 2019
- Distribution of Oligosoma salmo on a map of the South Island Known native range

Synonyms
- Oligosoma aff. infrapunctatum "Chesterfield"

= Oligosoma salmo =

Species of lizard

The Chesterfield or Kapitia skink (Oligosoma salmo) is a species of skink found in New Zealand. Only discovered in 1994 and for years not recognised as a distinct species, it is endemic to a narrow 1 km strip of coastal vegetation on the West Coast of New Zealand, 15 km north of Hokitika. There are fewer than 200 individuals remaining in the wild. Oligosoma salmo is the only New Zealand skink with a prehensile tail, suggesting it was once arboreal and inhabited coastal forest, which was subsequently cleared for dairy farming. Following the partial destruction of its remaining habitat in 2018 by a cyclone, a small captive breeding population was established at Auckland Zoo.

== Taxonomy ==
A Kapitia skink was first collected in February 1992 by Department of Conservation (DOC) Arahura Field Centre staff on a deer farm owned by the Field Centre manager, Shane Hall, at Chesterfield, 15 km north of Hokitika on the West Coast. This undistinguished individual was thought to be a cryptic skink (then Leiolopisma inconspicuum, now Oligisoma inconspicuum), a species that occurs in South Westland. A second skink was found in February 1993, and its tail colouration was distinctive enough that a search for more was organised for the following summer. In March 1994, DOC officers Geoff Patterson and Shane Hall found seven small skinks, measured five (which averaged 53.4 mm snout–vent), and collected two for further study. All had distinctive pink and red tail markings that distinguished them from common grass skinks (O. polychroma).

In the summer of 1995, the land where the skinks were found was put up for sale, to be developed into dairy pasture. A DOC team spent three days in March 1995 searching a 3.5 km × 500 m area between the Waimea and Kapitea Creeks, and found four more skinks, under logs near streams and in the marram grass (Ammophila arenaria) strip around the beach and paddocks. Following the sale of the land, the rough vegetation the skinks had inhabited was destroyed, and none were seen after 2001.

An analysis by Charlie Daugherty and Rod Hitchmough of blood allozymes of the skinks collected in March 1994 suggested they were related to, but distinct from, the speckled skink (O. infrapunctatum), a species otherwise only found on the West Coast north of Westport. A subsequent Masters' study by Miller, however, using different allozyme loci and a larger sample size, was not able to reliably distinguish the two, and so the Chesterfield skinks were treated as speckled skinks for conservation purposes.

Subsequent mitochondrial DNA studies of speckled skinks suggested there were one or more cryptic species in the O. infrapunctatum complex, and a 2008 study using DNA established large hidden divergences between outwardly-similar speckled skink populations, and the Chesterfield skink was a distinct clade ("3a"), most closely related to the Alborn Coal Mine skink (now O. albornense) found near Reefton ("3b"). Rather than a small variation caused by recent Pleistocene glaciation, the split between the Chesterfield/Alborn clade and other speckled skinks dates back to the Pliocene.

In a 2019 analysis of the O. infrapunctatum species complex, which named three new species, the Chesterfield skinks were formally described, and named Oligosoma salmo.

=== Nomenclature ===
Before it received a scientific name, this species was called the Chesterfield skink (Oligosoma aff. infrapunctatum "Chesterfield"), after its only known locality. The area is known by local Māori as Kapitia (often misspelled "Kapitea") and in November 2020, the skinks were given the name "Kapitia skink". The species' Latin epithet, salmo, refers to the distinctive salmon-pink scales on the underside of its tail.

== Range and habitat ==
Chesterfield is an area mostly composed of dairy farms with few houses. To the west is the Tasman Sea, and to the east State Highway 6 and a plateau of regenerating scrub. O. salmo are found in a small strip of coastal vegetation approximately 1 km long and only 5 m wide. Since their discovery in the 1990s, their pasture habitat has been converted into dairy farms, and they only occur in highly modified non-native vegetation between dairy paddocks and beachfront sand dunes, sheltering under debris (such as discarded corrugated iron), driftwood, shrubs, and rough pasture grass.

Unlike all other New Zealand skinks, this species has a prehensile tail it uses to grip objects and aid climbing. Researchers noticed that when they picked up a Chesterfield skink, it would wrap its tail about their fingers, something a speckled skink could not do. The tail has a noticeably firm grip, with the contracted muscles forming ridges along its length, and is able to suspend the entire skink unaided. This suggests O. salmo is adapted to climbing trees, and that its current habitat is what remained when the coastal forest behind the beach was cleared for farming.

== Description ==
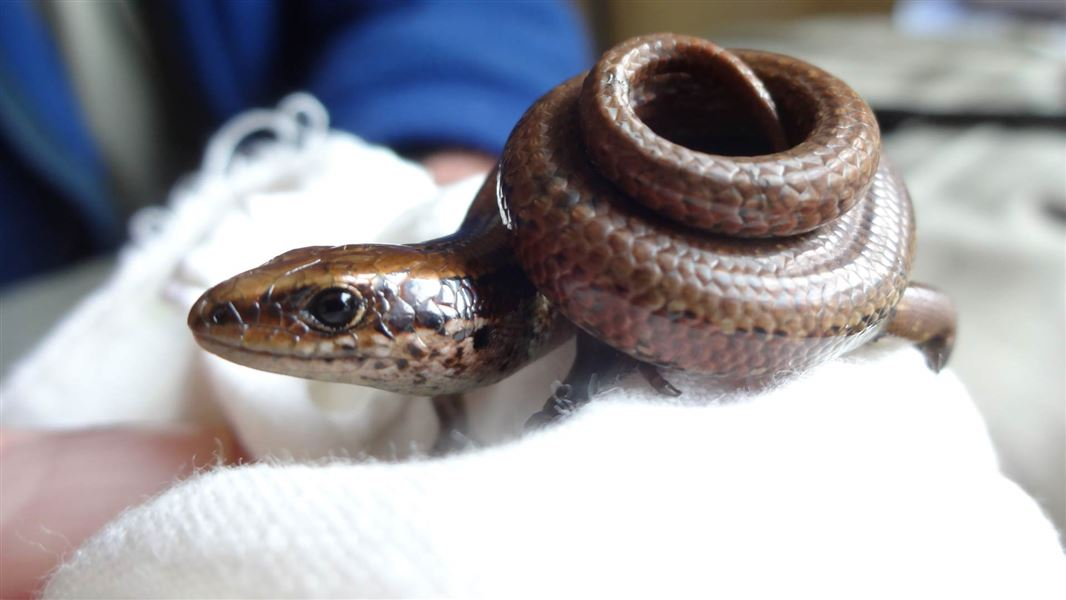
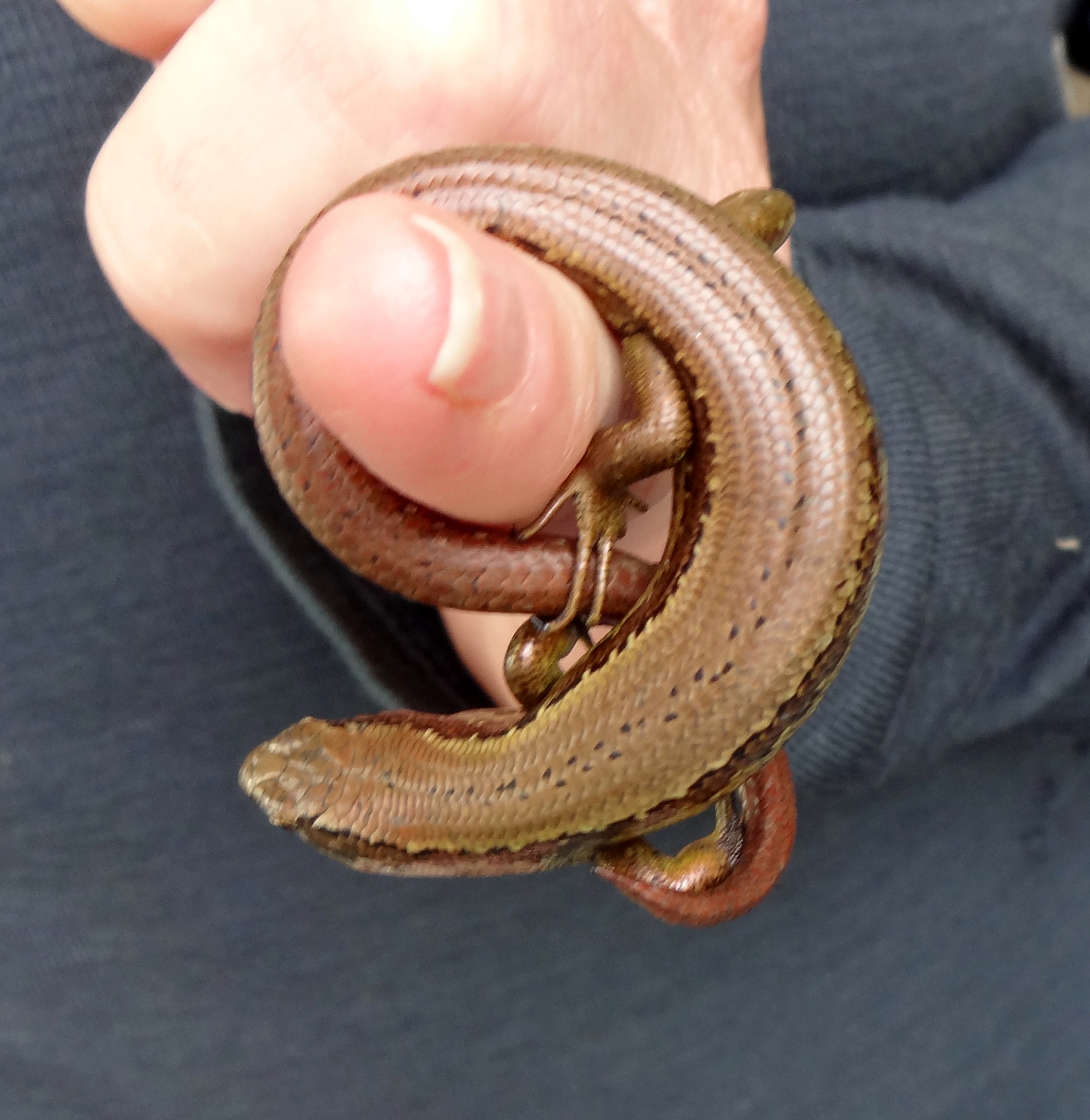
O. salmo showing its coiled prehensile tail

O. salmo showing the pattern of markings on the lateral band

O. salmo is similar to the speckled skink (O. infrapunctatum), but with a more slender build, glossier, and with its distinctive patterning underneath the tail. Kapitia skinks are up to 85 mm from snout to vent (usually < 75 mm, typically 65–75 mm) with a tail longer than the body. They weigh up to 10.5 g. Their back is brown with light and dark flecks and no mid-dorsal stripe; their underside is yellow and unmarked, with a pinkish tinge around the throat. They have a golden, glossy sheen. The underside of the tail begins yellow and then changes abruptly to a mottled pattern of scales in grey, black, and a distinctive shade of pinkish orange. Down each flank is a red-brown stripe, edged in black and flecked and fringed with a pale band above and below with heavily notched margins. The pattern of notches and flecks in the lateral band is unique for each skink, and can be used to identify captured individuals.

== Ecology ==
Kapitia skinks reach sexual maturity relatively slowly, at about 4 years of age, and give birth in late summer, around February (like all but one of New Zealand's native skinks, they bear live young rather than lay eggs). One of the skinks captured in 2018 and sent to Auckland Zoo subsequently gave birth to five young. These skinks primarily hunt invertebrates, but may have fed on berries before the coastal forest was cleared. They are diurnal, basking in the sun, but hiding if disturbed.

== Conservation ==
By 2008, when the Chesterfield skinks were recognised as a separate species, none had been seen for seven years. A 2009 survey found no skinks, and another in 2013 found just two. Neither were found outside the area the species had been first recorded in the 1990s. Three surveys in 2015 using live traps and artificial shelters made of Onduline roofing tiles captured only 17 skinks. A further survey in November 2015 caught 52 skinks, including 24 not previously recorded, and the total population size was estimated at 40–50. Since 2015, the Department of Conservation has made an annual survey of the population, and continue to capture, photograph, measure, and identify individual skinks.

DOC skink processing, April 2021 survey

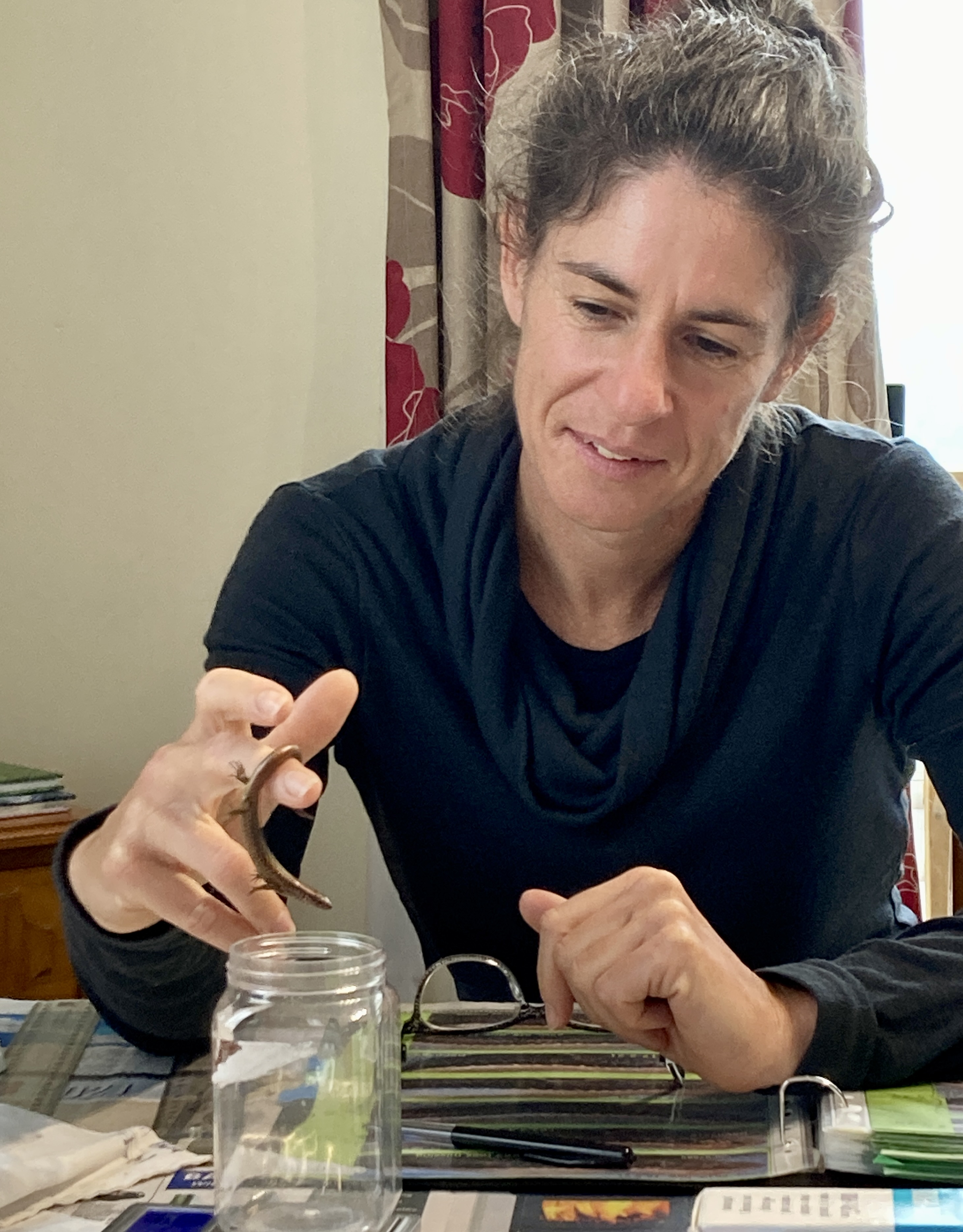
DOC reptile specialist Lynn Adams showing the prehensile nature of the skink's tail

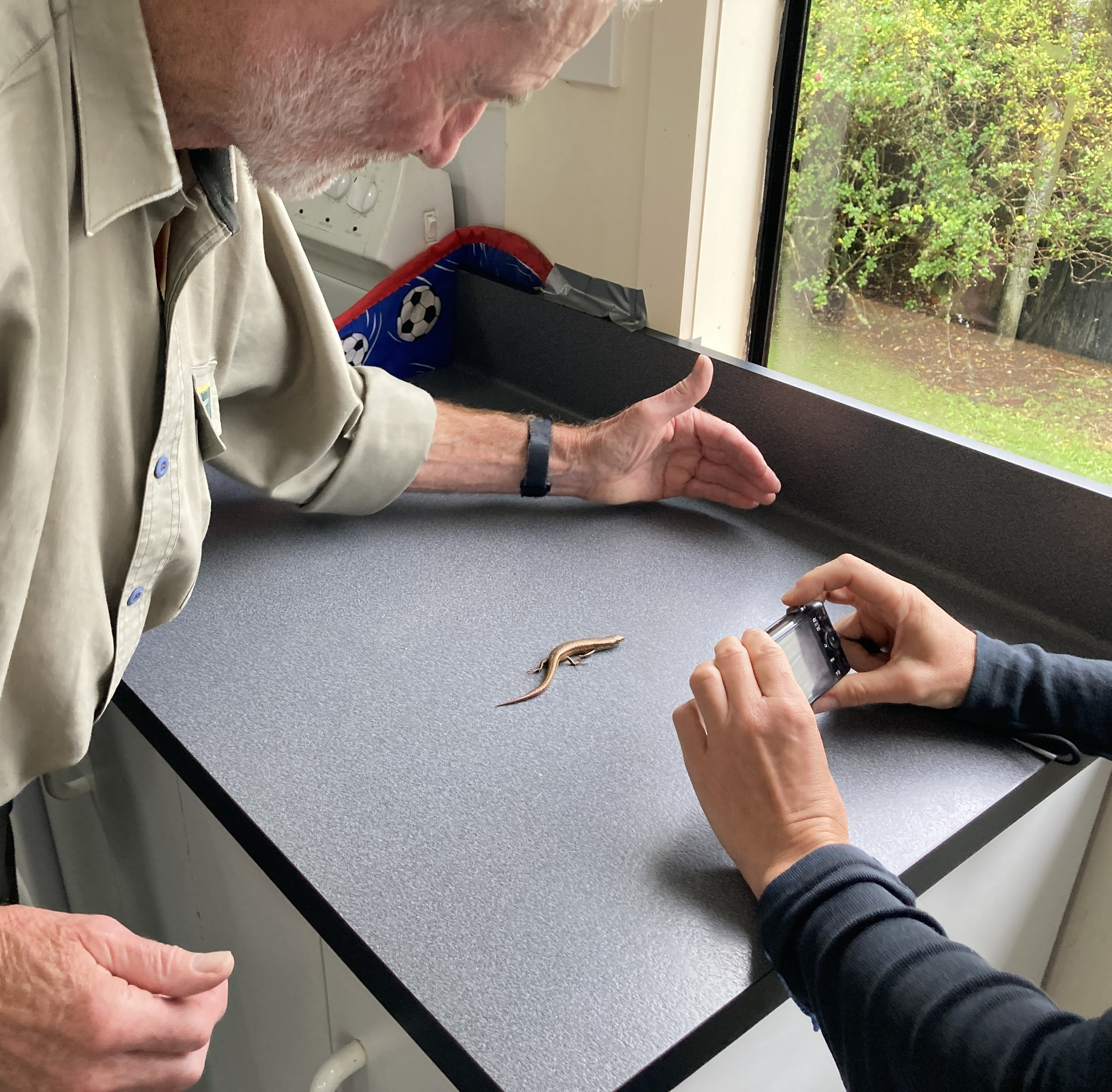
Les Moran and Lynn Adams photographing a skink to be added to the database

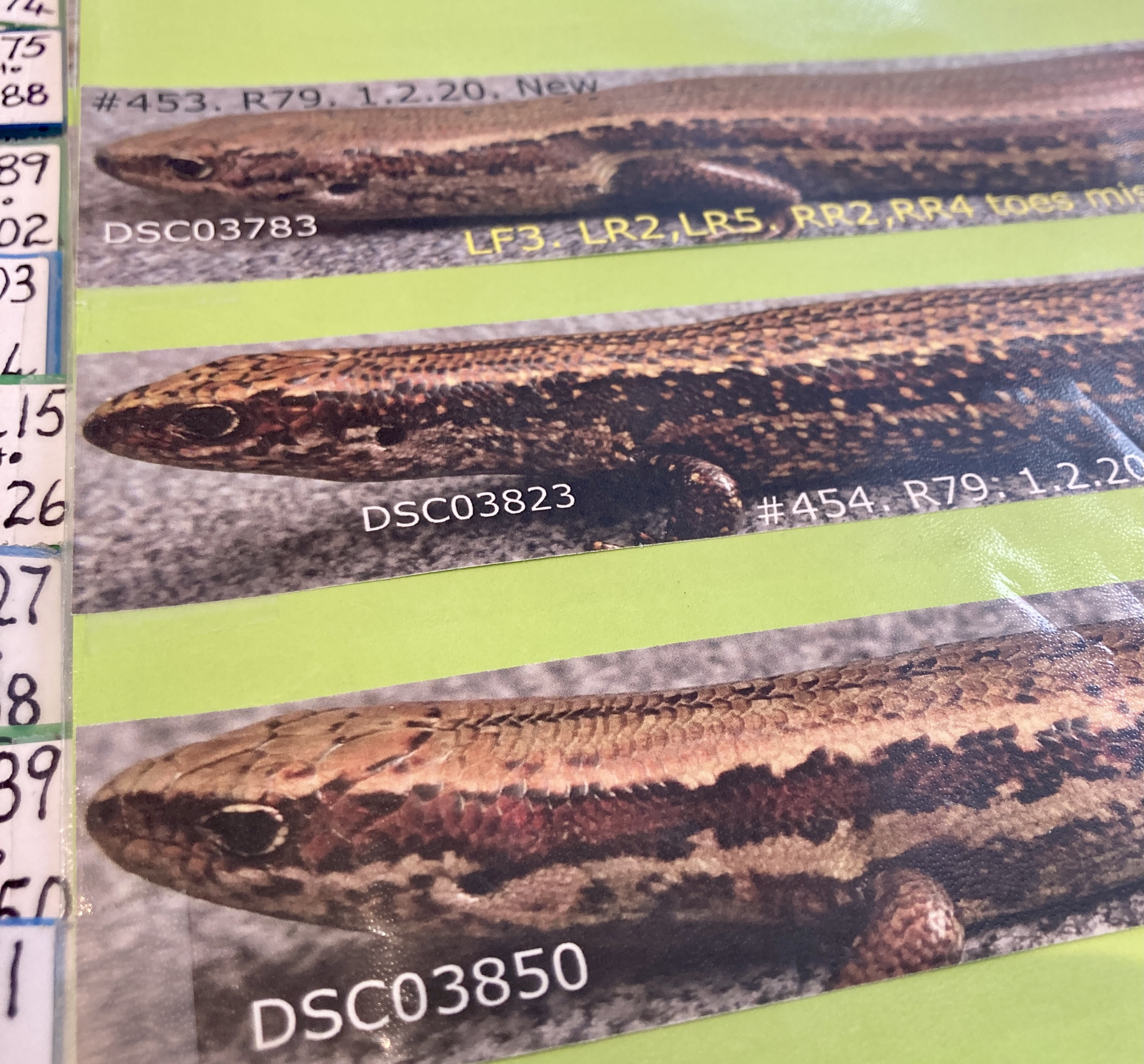
Identification photos of individual skinks

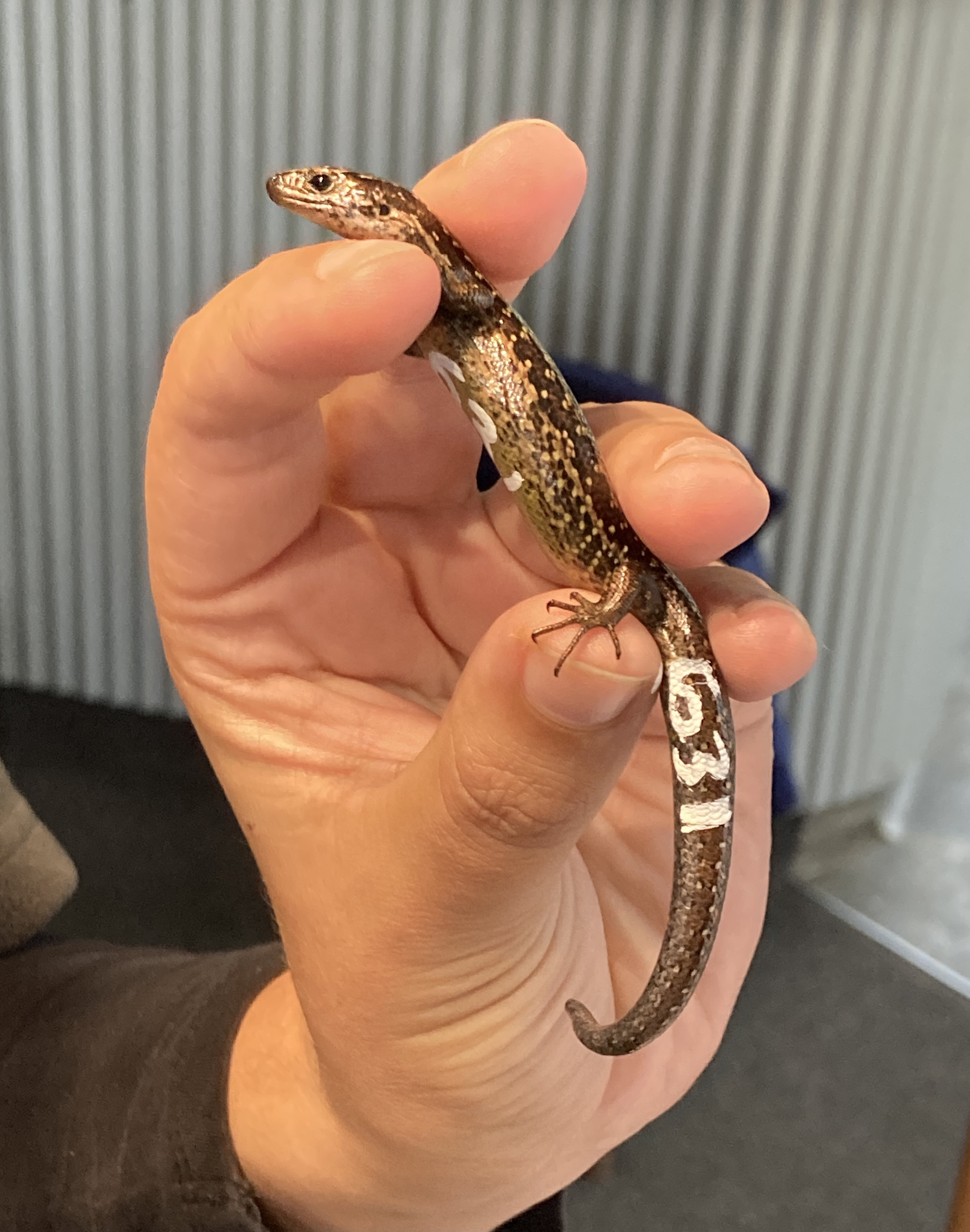
Measured and photographed skink, temporarily labelled with white marker which wears off in a few days

In New Zealand, all native reptiles are protected by the Wildlife Act 1953, and it is illegal to keep or even pick up lizards without a permit. Handling lizards is stressful and can cause them to drop their tail, which contains important stores of fat. With approximately 200 individuals in the wild, the NZ TCS threat status for O. salmo has been "Threatened–Nationally Critical" since 2009.

The greatest threat to skinks is mice, which will attack lizards that are too cold to move and eat them alive. Other predators include cats, rats, hedgehogs, mustelids, and weka. Their habitat is threatened by vehicle damage, fire, and storms.

In February 2018, tidal surges caused by Cyclone Fehi submerged the entire home range of the population over two tides, and destroyed almost half of its habitat. DOC researchers thought at the time that the cyclone may have made the species extinct. Fearing the effects of a subsequent cyclone, DOC rangers collected 50 individuals and with 24 hours' notice transported them to a captive breeding programme at Auckland Zoo's New Zealand Centre for Conservation Medicine (NZCCM) – a rescue procedure that had already been successfully followed with cobble skinks (Oligosoma robinsoni). By November 2020, sixteen Kapitia skinks had been born in captivity. All babies were separated from their parents to stop cannibalism.

In 2019, the population was estimated at 150–200. In 2020, the team identified during their field survey 94 skinks not seen before, interpreted as population growth as the species recovered from Cyclone Fehi. In November 2020, DOC purchased 1.3 hectares of coastal skink habitat, with the intention of building a predator-proof fence, replanting suitable trees, and eventually reintroducing the Auckland Zoo population to the wild.
