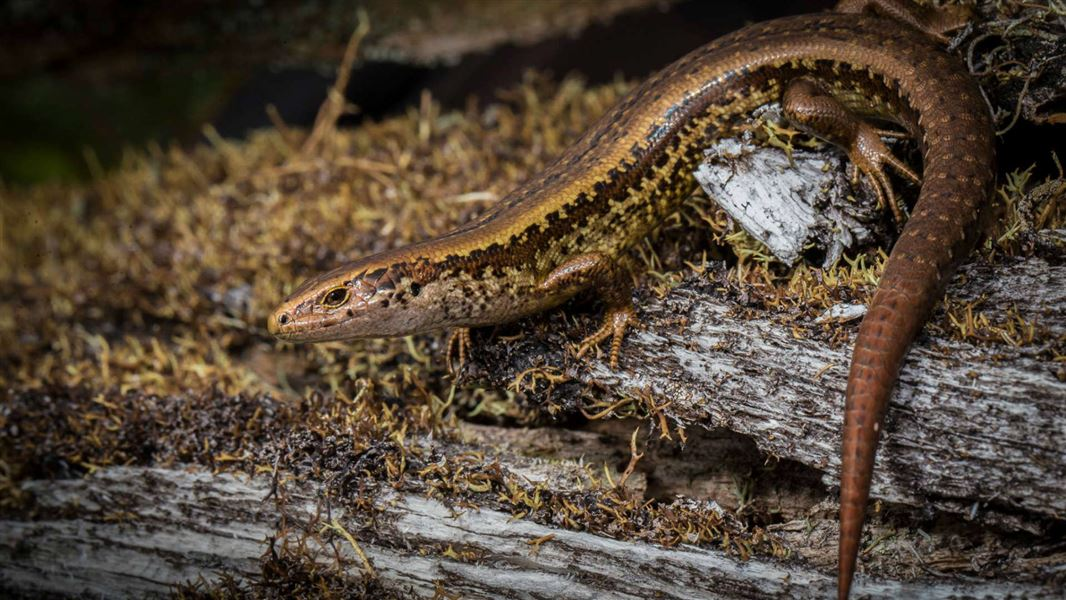
- Male Alborn skink

Conservation status
- Nationally Critical (NZ TCS)

Scientific classification
- Kingdom: Animalia
- Phylum: Chordata
- Class: Reptilia
- Order: Squamata
- Family: Scincidae
- Genus: Oligosoma
- Species: O. albornense

Binomial name
- Oligosoma albornense Melzer, Hitchmough, Bell, Chapple, & Patterson, 2019
- Distribution of Oligosoma albornense on a map of the South Island Known native range

Synonyms
- Oligosoma aff. infrapunctatum "Alborn"

= Oligosoma albornense =

Species of skink endemic to New Zealand

The Alborn skink (Oligosoma albornense) is a critically endangered and poorly known species of skink only found in a single 2 ha site near Reefton, New Zealand. It is classified as "Nationally Critical" by the Department of Conservation under the New Zealand Threat Classification System.

== Taxonomy ==
For many years the speckled skink (Oligosoma infrapunctatum) was considered to be a widespread and common New Zealand species, but genetic analysis revealed it is actually a species complex made up of numerous localised and visually similar but genetically distinct skink species.

In 1992 a distinctive population of speckled skinks were identified by Tony Whitaker and Mike Meads at a site near Reefton, on the West Coast of the South Island. These were re-identified in a Department of Conservation lizard survey in 1997–1998. A 2008 molecular analysis by Greaves et al. identified the Alborn Coal Mine skinks as genetically distinct from other populations of O. infrapunctatum. A 2019 study confirmed this, named and described the species Oligosoma albornense, and established its closest relative was the Kapitia skink (O. salmo). The O. albornense/O. salmo clade is one of several distinct lineages of speckled skink that originated in the Pliocene and survived multiple glacial cycles in Westland.

== Name ==
The species takes its name from its type locality, the Alborn Coal Mine, which the Alborn family operated from 1908 to 1966.

== Description ==
Although O. albornense is genetically distinct from other members of the speckled skink complex, it looks similar and can only be distinguished by several subtle characters: less than 69 ventral scales unlike O. newmani, a narrower head than O. robinsoni, more subdigital lamellae and a shorter tail than O. auroraensis. It is a long slender skink with a brown speckled back and a pale dorsolateral stripe with notched edges. A dark brown lateral band is bordered below by a thin pale notched stripe. The stripes do not continue down the (intact) tail, which is at least as long as the body and lacks the colourful blotched underside of O. salmo. Alborn skinks have dark brown eyes and wedge-shaped snouts with a grey chin and throat. Unlike O. infrapunctatum, their underside is ochre-yellow, turning grey partway down the tail. Their snout-vent length is up to 87 mm, and they weigh on average 11.5 g.

== Range ==
O. albornense is endemic to New Zealand and has been recorded from just one 2 ha site, the Alborn Coal Mine south of Reefton, near Big River. This a mid-altitude (550 m) cool-temperature site with high rainfall.

== Habitat ==
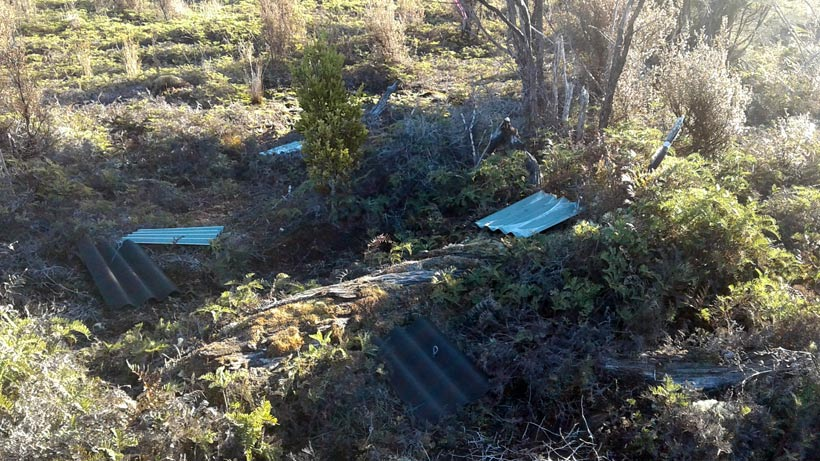
Alborn skink habitat with monitoring devices

The Alborn Coal Mine had been abandoned for 30 years when this species was first found around discarded mining machinery, in an area that had been cleared but was filled with regenerating native vegetation. Their preferred habitat may be native shrubland and gaps in beech forest. It has also been found in nearby pākihi wetland and seems tolerant of wet conditions; when the pākihi floods during heavy rain, the skinks climb to logs and high points to keep clear of the water.

== Conservation ==
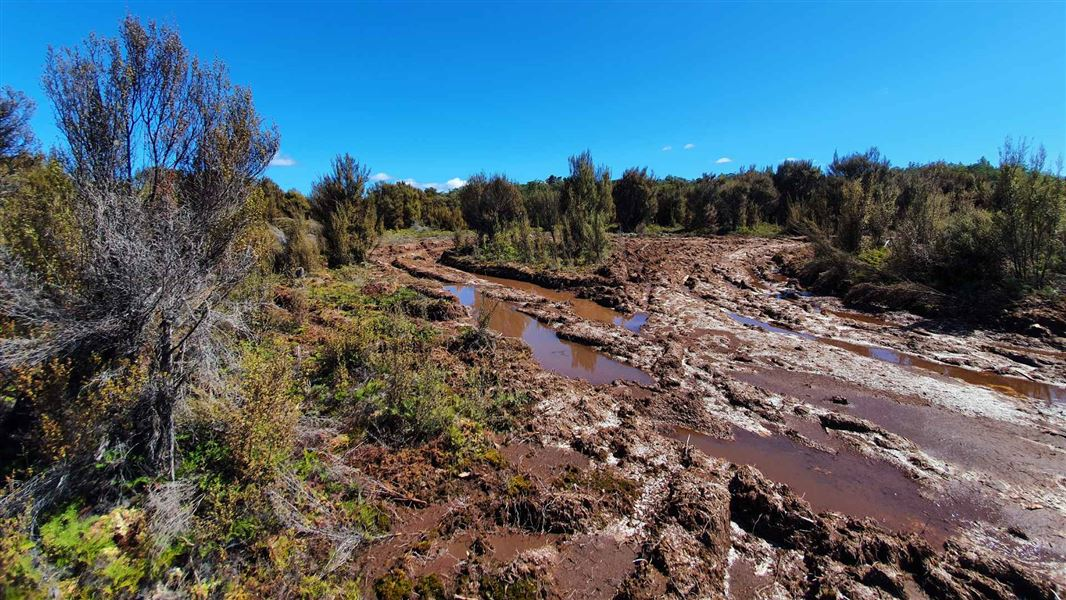
Vehicle damage in Alborn skink habitat, November 2020

O. albornense is classified as "Nationally Critical" in the Department of Conservation's New Zealand Threat Classification System. Before 2015 there were only 7 records of the species, and by 2017 less than 20 individuals had ever been seen. A 2019 study reported only a single individual in a search of the 2 ha habitat. Their very small range makes them vulnerable to extinction, and they are probably being preyed upon by mice, rats, mustelids, and weka. In 2025 it was estimated that only 30 skinks remain, down from 50–60 in 2023, due to predation by mice.

The skink habitat is off-limits to vehicles, but in November 2020 four-wheel-drive vehicles drove over and through the habitat, churning up terrain and destroying skink-monitoring pit covers. Vandals cut down trees to make tracks, destroyed fences and gates, and turned part of the habitat into a "mud hole". The Department of Conservation plans to build a fence around the skinks' habitat during 2025.
