= Tātahi skink =

Conservation status
- Declining (NZ TCS)

Scientific classification
- Kingdom: Animalia
- Phylum: Chordata
- Class: Reptilia
- Order: Squamata
- Family: Scincidae
- Subfamily: Eugongylinae
- Genus: Oligosoma
- Species: O. aff. smithi "Three Kings, Te Paki, Western Northland"

Binomial name
- Oligosoma aff. smithi "Three Kings, Te Paki, Western Northland"

Species of lizard

The tātahi skink (Oligosoma aff. smithi "Three Kings, Te Paki, Western Northland") is an undescribed skink species endemic to New Zealand in the family Scincidae, found on the western coast of the Northland Peninsula and Manawatāwhi / Three Kings Islands in New Zealand. Thought to be the same species as Oligosoma smithi of the east coast, the Tātahi skink was identified as being genetically distinct in 2008.

== Taxonomy ==
The species is currently not formally described, but was recognised as genetically distinct from Oligosoma smithi after a 2008 genetic study showed that the two populations diverged in the Late Pliocene, approximately 4,300,000 years ago. The species common name, Tātahi, refers to a Māori language word for the beach. The interim scientific name was standardised as Oligosoma aff. smithi 'Three Kings, Te Paki, Western Northland' in 2014.

== Description ==
Tātahi skinks have a snout–vent length of up to 80 mm (3.1 in) but are typically smaller. The species has a pointed snout, and is highly variable in colour, but typically has gold or white flecks, and a prominent dark brown band that runs from its head to its tail.

Tātahi skinks are morphologically very similar to Oligosoma smithi, and currently can only be distinguished as the two species' ranges do not overlap.

== Distribution and habitat ==
The species occurs on the west coast of the Northland Peninsula, between Muriwai beach in the Auckland Region to North Cape, and is also found in Manawatāwhi / Three Kings Islands and Motuopao Island. The species is found along shorelines and vegetation close to beaches.

== Behaviour ==
Tātahi skinks are diurnal, often spending time sunbasking. The skinks are thought to share a similar ecological niche to the closely related species Oligosoma smithi of the eastern Northland Peninsula.

The species is omnivorous, feeding on coastal invertebrates, fruit, and likely shoreline-related carrion.

== Conservation status ==
As of 2021 the Department of Conservation (DOC) classified the tātahi skink as Declining under the New Zealand Threat Classification System. The species is considered Regionally Declining in the Auckland Region, in part due to there being no safe-guarded island populations in the region.
