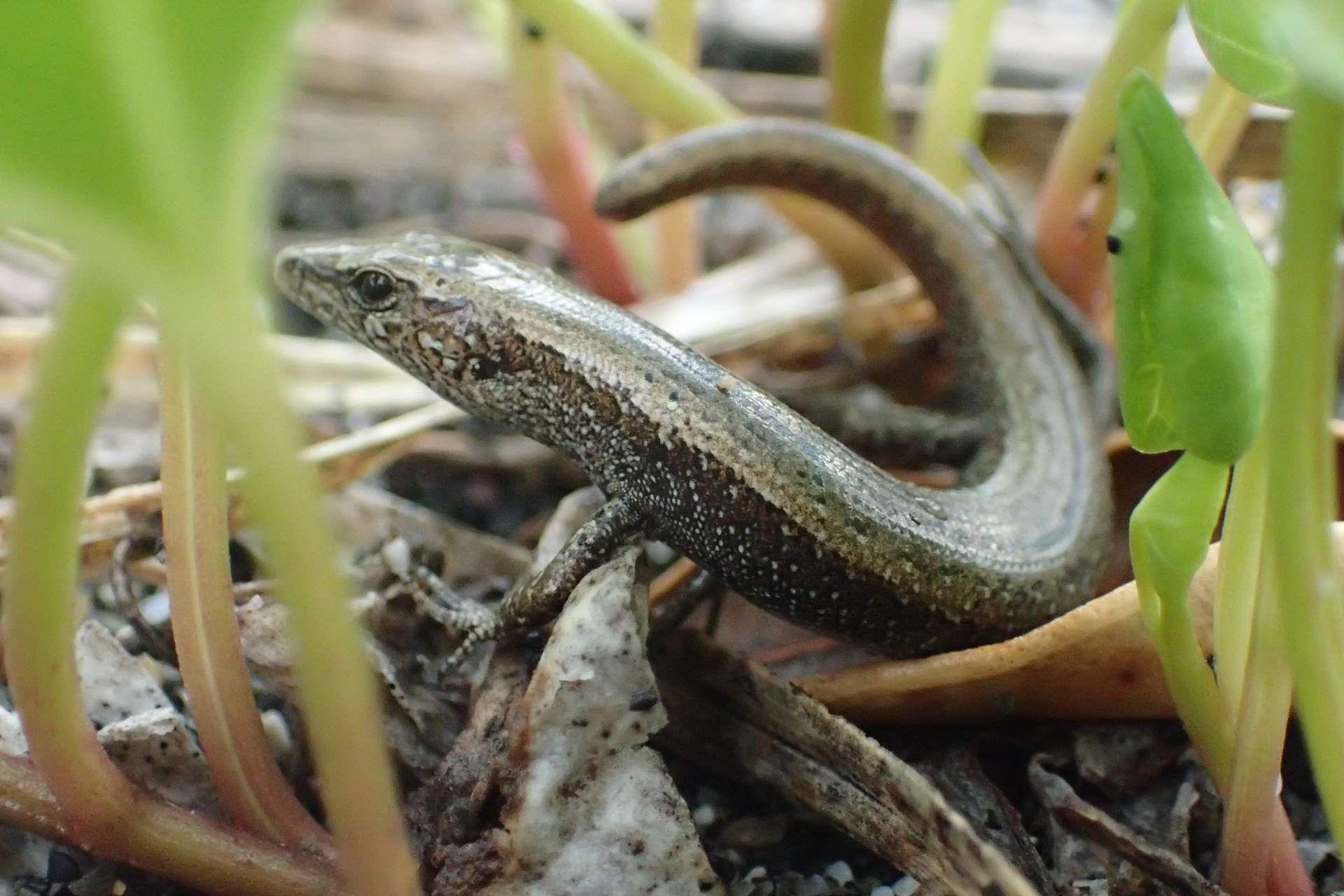

Scientific classification
- Kingdom: Animalia
- Phylum: Chordata
- Class: Reptilia
- Order: Squamata
- Family: Scincidae
- Genus: Oligosoma
- Species: O. smithi

Binomial name
- Oligosoma smithi (Gray, 1845)
- Distribution of Oligosoma smithi in the North Island Known native range

Synonyms
- Mocoa smithii Gray, 1845; Lygosomella aestuosa Girard, 1857; Lampropholis smithii — Fitzinger, 1861; Euprepes smithii — Steindachner, 1869; Norbea isolata Hutton, 1872; Lygosoma smithii — Boulenger, 1887; Lygosoma (Leiolopisma) smithi — M.A. Smith, 1937; Leiolopisma smithii — Mittleman, 1952; Lygosomella smithi — Wells & Wellington, 1985; Oligosoma smithi — Patterson & Daugherty, 1995

= Oligosoma smithi =

Species of lizard

Oligosoma smithi, commonly known as the shore skink, short-tailed skink, Smith's ground skink, Smith's moco, and Smith's skink, is a species of lizard in the family Scincidae (skinks) that is native to New Zealand.

== Taxonomy ==
This species was first described as Mocoa smithii by John Edward Gray. The specific name, smithi, is in honor of Gray's nephew, British naval officer Lt Alexander John Smith, who collected the original specimens in the early 1840s, and presented them to his uncle at the British Museum. After being placed in several other genera it was moved in 1995 to the genus Oligosoma, with all other New Zealand skink species.

== Description ==
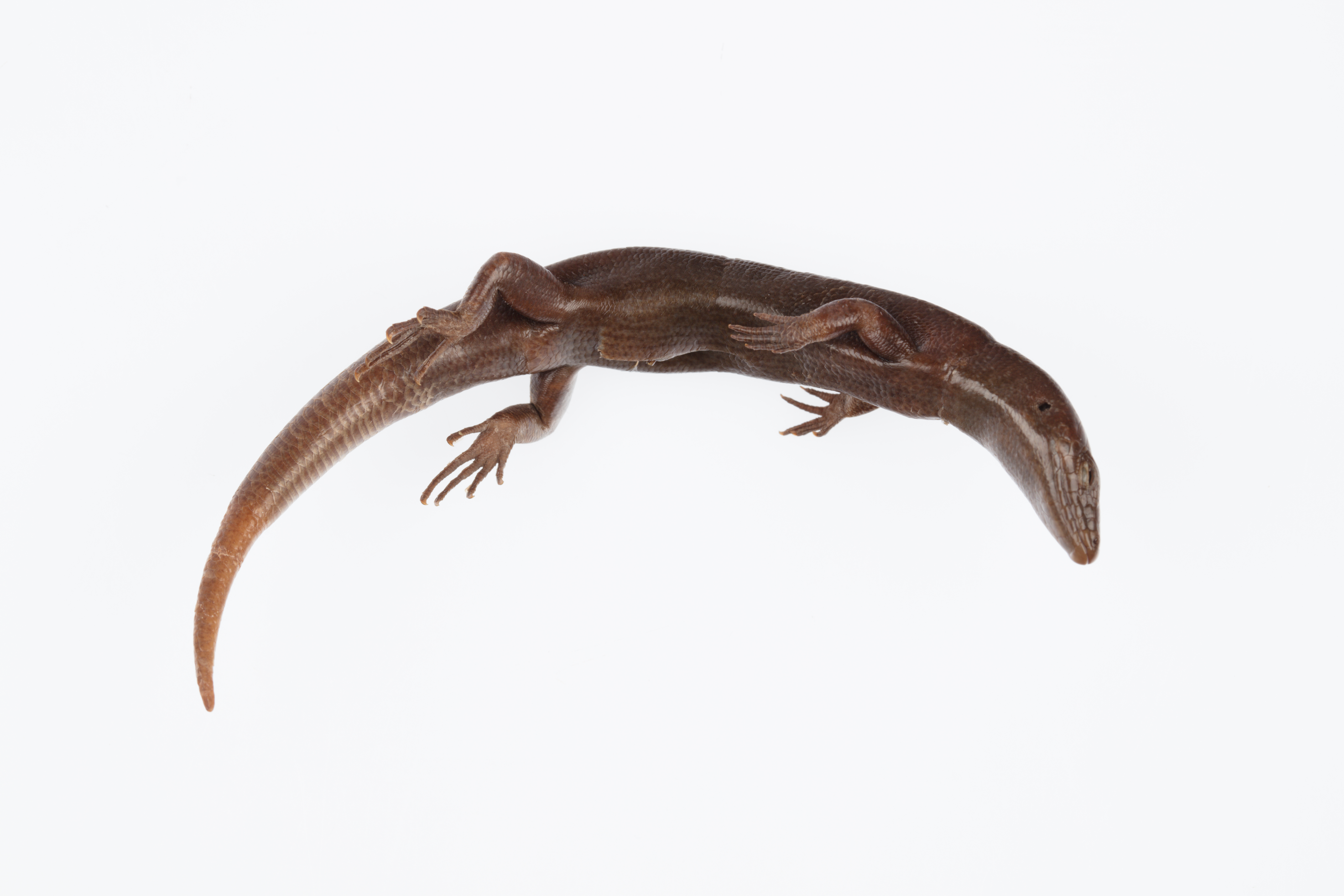
Scientific specimen collected from the Mercury Islands

Oligosoma smithi is small species of skink, growing to a snout-to-vent length (SVL) of 82 mm (3.2 in). It is well camouflaged, and may be found in a range of colours, with considerable variance seen between different populations, and within the same population groups. Individuals who tend to live in white sandy habitats tend to be lighter in colour, while those that live on offshore islands tending to be a glossy jet black colour.

The species can be distinguished from Oligosoma suteri due to O. Smithi having smaller eyes, smaller feet and shorter toes, and less visible brow.

== Distribution and habitat ==
The species is native to the northern half of the North Island of New Zealand, occurring on the eastern coast from the Aupōuri Peninsula in the north south to Gisborne. Closely-related skinks on the western shore of the North Island and the Three Kings Islands were formerly considered members of this species, but are now known as tātahi skinks (Oligosoma aff. smithi "Three Kings, Te Paki, Western Northland").

It is always found near the shoreline and prefers open areas such as around driftwood at the high tide mark.

== Behaviour ==
Oligosoma smithi is diurnal (active during the day) and spends most of its time hunting or basking in the sun. It eats insects typically found along coastlines, and is known to occasionally eat fruit and scavenge birds and fish.

Like most New Zealand skinks, it is viviparous (reproduces by giving birth to live young). The species typically mates around October, with between four and six young born each year between January and February.

== Conservation status ==
As of 2012 the Department of Conservation (DOC) classified Oligosoma smithi as Not Threatened under the New Zealand Threat Classification System.
