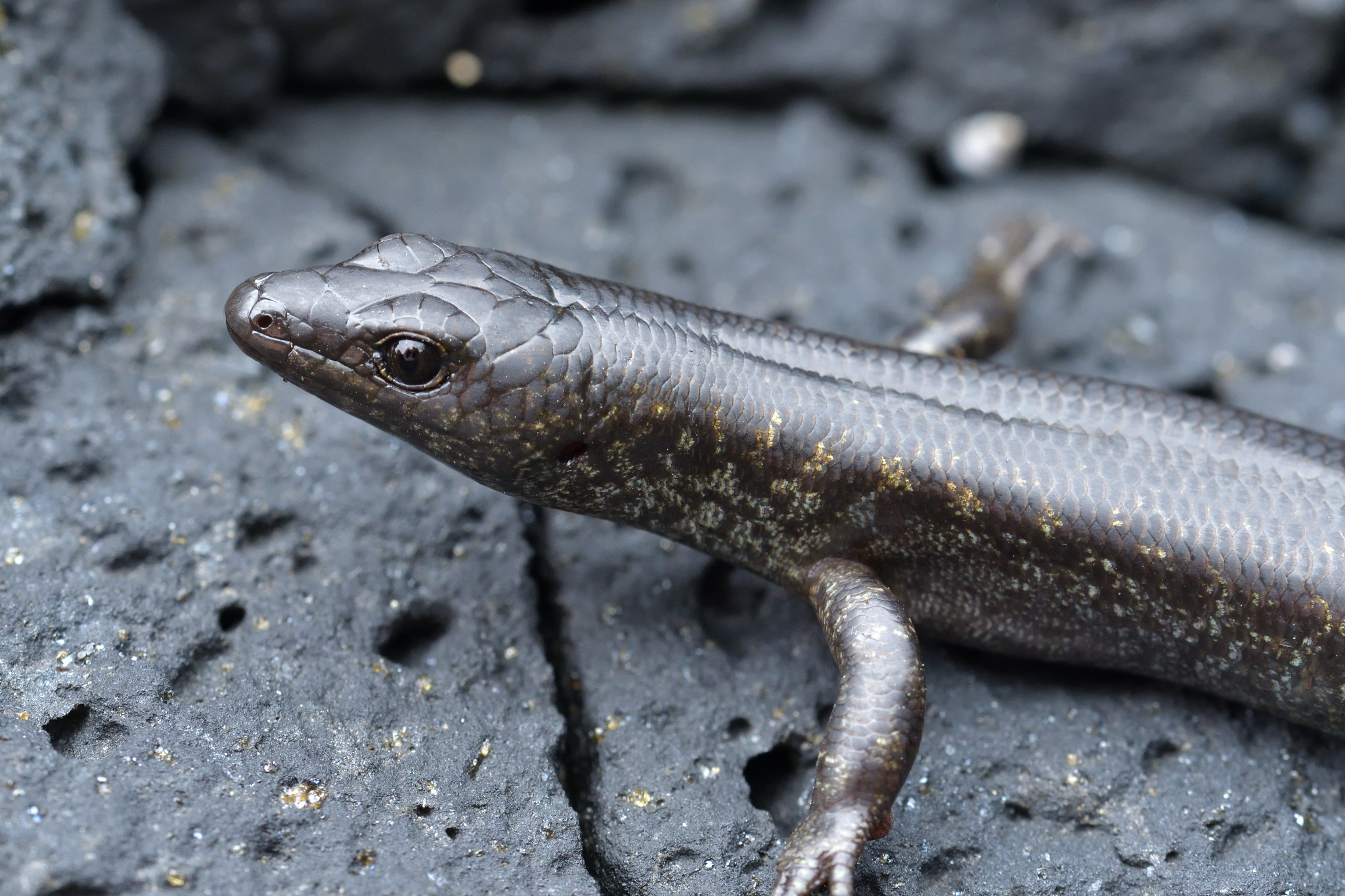

Conservation status
- Least Concern (IUCN 3.1)

Scientific classification
- Kingdom: Animalia
- Phylum: Chordata
- Class: Reptilia
- Order: Squamata
- Family: Scincidae
- Genus: Oligosoma
- Species: O. suteri

Binomial name
- Oligosoma suteri (Boulenger, 1906)
- Distribution of the Oligosoma suteri on the North Island map Known native range

Synonyms
- Lygosoma suteri Boulenger, 1906; Lygosoma (Leiolopisma) suteri M.A. Smith, 1937; Leiolopisma suteri McCann, 1955; Robbisaurus suteri Wells & Wellington, 1985

= Oligosoma suteri =

Species of lizard

Oligosoma suteri, known commonly as Suter's skink, the black shore skink, the egg-laying skink, and Suter's ground skink, is a species of lizard in the family Scincidae. The species is endemic to New Zealand, found in fragmented populations on the mainland of the Coromandel Peninsula as far south as the Coromandel Peninsula, and on offshore northern islands of New Zealand.

== Taxonomy ==
The species was first described in 1906 as Lygosoma suteri by George Albert Boulenger based on a single specimen from Great Barrier Island identified by Henry Suter. In 1955, Charles McCann recombined the species as Leiolopisma suteri. This was the accepted scientific name until 1994, when Geoff Patterson and Charles Daugherty reinstated the genus Oligosoma, placing the chevron skink within the genus.

Both the specific name, suteri, and two of the common names, "Suter's skink" and "Suter's ground skink", honour Henry Suter (1841–1918), New Zealand zoologist and palaeontologist.

== Description ==
O. suteri has a snout–vent length of up to 126 mm (5.0 in). The species has glossy scales, a long snout, and a prominent brow. The species is typically brown or grey, marked with irregularly shaped blotches of black, gold or brown. Individuals of species are highly variable in colour and pattern.

Juveniles of the species can be mistake for O. smithi, but can be identified by O. suteri having glossier scales and prominent brows.

== Biology ==
The species inhabits the coast, often very close to the water, eating mainly intertidal amphipods that in turn subsist on dead seaweed. It is known to hunt for prey in rock pools and is a capable swimmer. Suter's skink reaches densities (up to 13/m^{2}) that are among the highest lizard densities recorded anywhere in the world.

== Oviparity ==
O. suteri is the only native New Zealand skink to lay eggs – hence another of its common names, the "egg-laying skink". (The egg-laying rainbow skink, Lampropholis delicata, is present in some parts of New Zealand, but is introduced from Australia). Females dig nests and lay eggs under sand, pebbles or boulders from late December to mid February. Eggs hatch sooner if incubated at warmer temperatures, taking 75–80 days when incubated at 22 °C, and approximately 55 days at a constant 26 °C.

== Geographic range and habitat ==
O. suteri lives in fragmented populations on the mainland of the North Island and northern offshore islands, from North Cape to the Coromandel Peninsula. The species is found in island groups from the Three Kings Islands to the Alderman Islands, at latitudes north of 37°S. The species typically lives in the splash zone of rocky beaches.

== Gallery ==
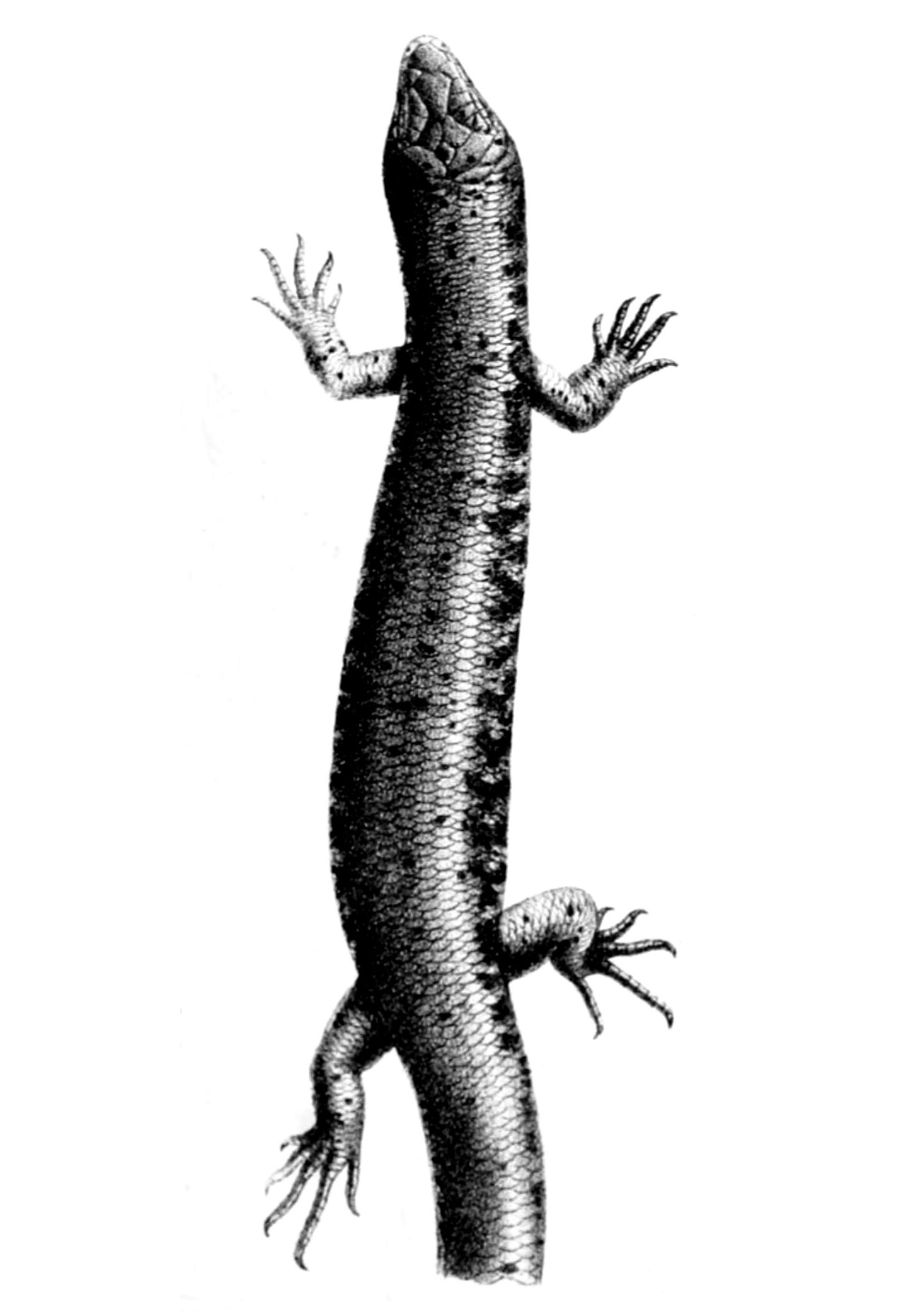
1906 illustration from George Albert Boulenger's original type description

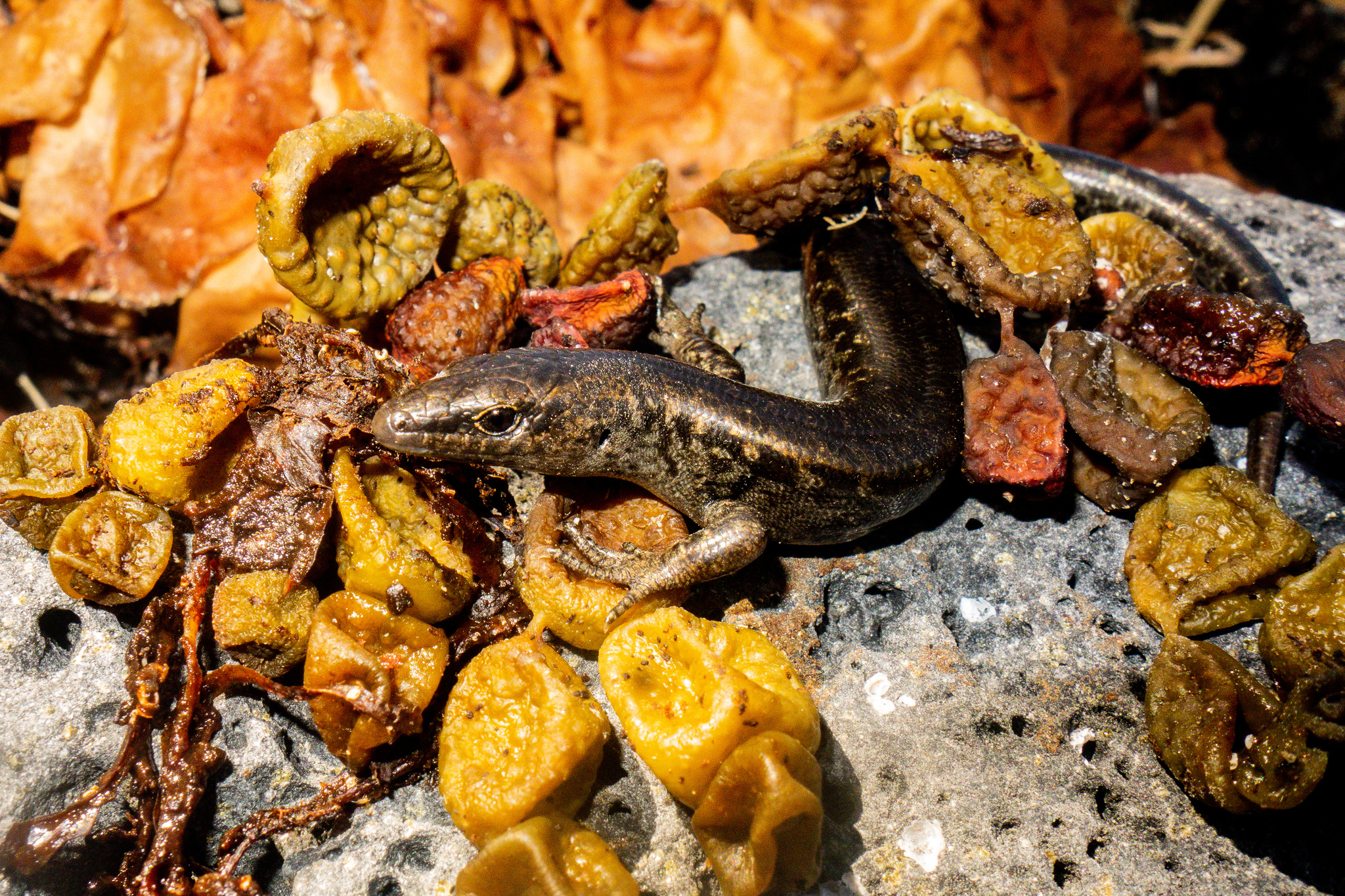
O. suteri seen on an offshore island in the Auckland Region

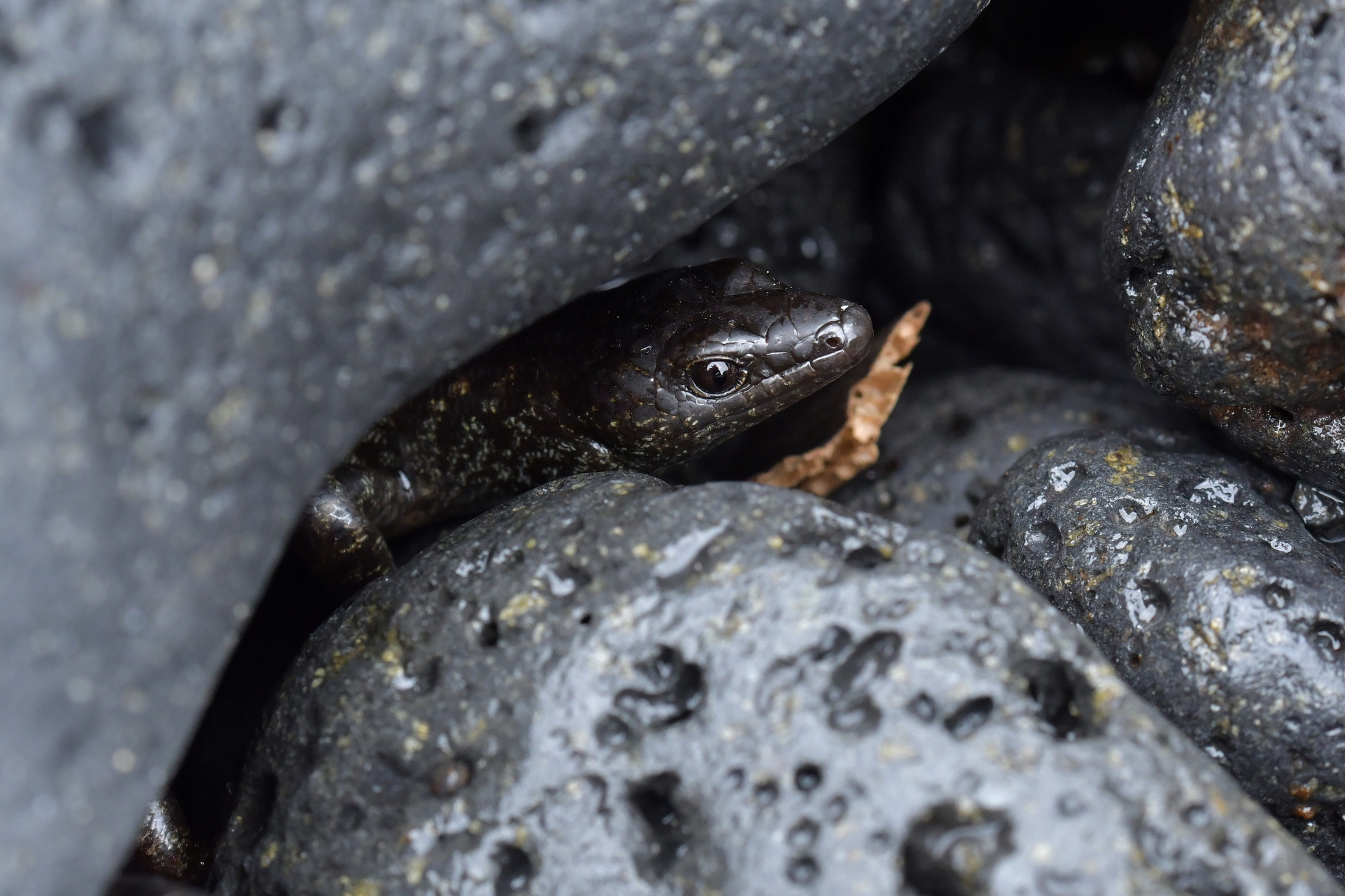
O. suteri is typically found in ledges of rocky shorelines
