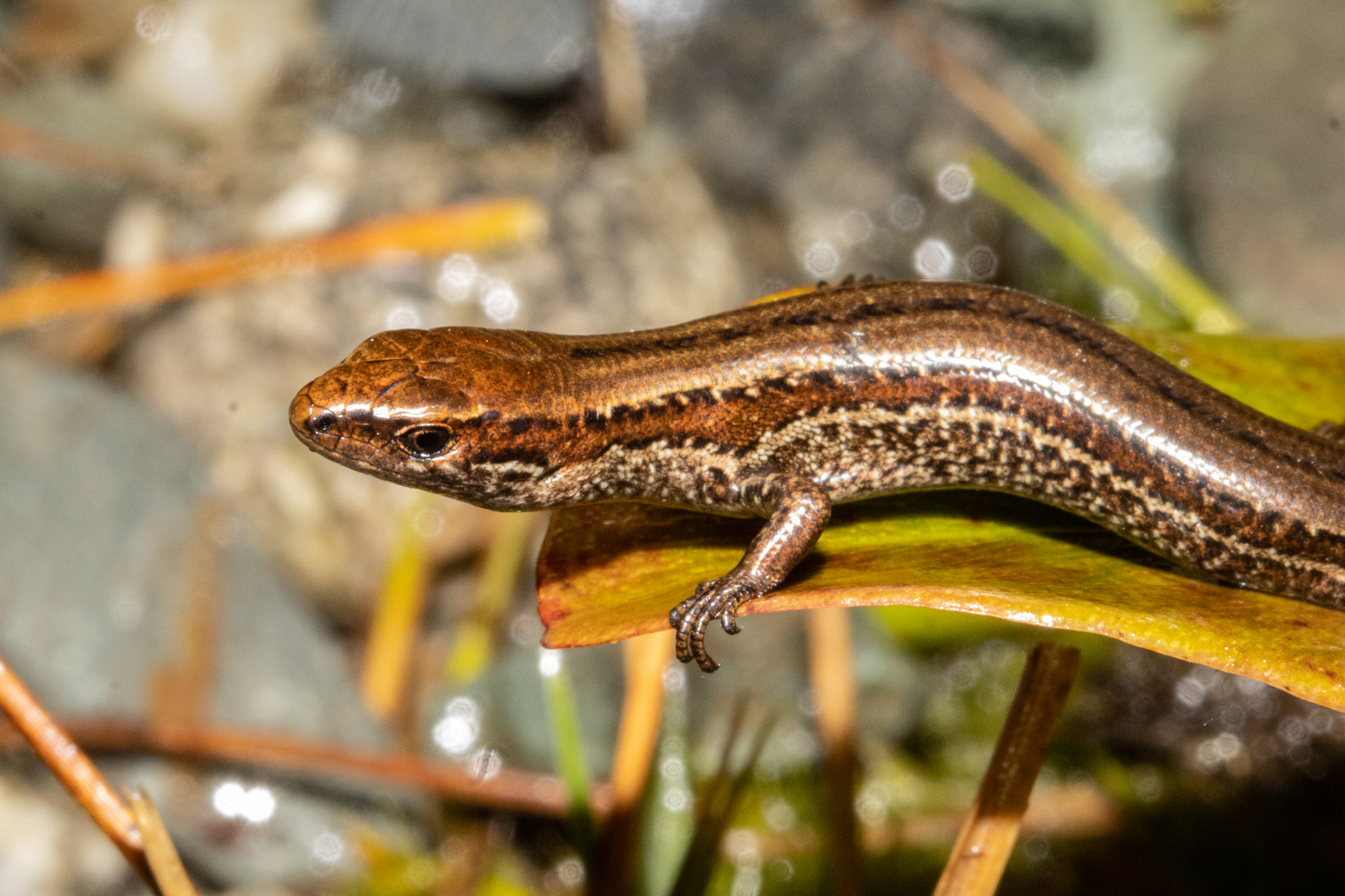
- Oligosoma newmani found near Birchfield, West Coast Region, New Zealand

Scientific classification
- Kingdom: Animalia
- Phylum: Chordata
- Class: Reptilia
- Order: Squamata
- Family: Scincidae
- Genus: Oligosoma
- Species: O. newmani

Binomial name
- Oligosoma newmani Wells & Wellington, 1985
- Distribution of Oligosoma newmani on a map of the South Island Known native range

= Oligosoma newmani =

Species of lizard

Newman's speckled skink (Oligosoma newmani) is a species of skink found in New Zealand.
