= Cobble skink =

Conservation status
- Nationally Critical (NZ TCS)

Scientific classification
- Kingdom: Animalia
- Phylum: Chordata
- Class: Reptilia
- Order: Squamata
- Family: Scincidae
- Subfamily: Eugongylinae
- Genus: Oligosoma
- Species: O. aff. infrapunctatum "cobble"

Binomial name
- Oligosoma aff. infrapunctatum "cobble"

Species of lizard

The cobble skink (Oligosoma aff. infrapunctatum "cobble") in the family Scincidae is a skink species endemic to New Zealand, initially known only from a single small stretch of stony beach at Granity, on the West Coast. In 2016 this population was on the brink of extinction, with declining numbers and a threatened habitat, and all known individuals were captured and taken to Auckland Zoo.

Larger wild populations have since been discovered, and in January 2025 the captive population was released back into the wild.

== Taxonomy ==
The cobble skink is part of the speckled skink (Oligosoma infrapunctatum) complex, and it was first listed as a distinct species in a field guide, based on morphological differences, although at the time there was no genetic evidence to support this. Subsequently, its distinct status has been confirmed by a genetic analysis, although it has yet to be formally named and described.

== Description ==
Cobble skinks are small (60–65 mm snout–vent length) lizards that resemble speckled skinks: medium brown above, with a darker central stripe bordered by lighter spots, dark brown stripes on a cream background along their sides with lighter notches and flecks, and a murky yellow underbelly varyingly spotted with black. Their eye colour ranges from medium to dark brown. They are smaller than most speckled skinks and their back is generally a more uniform brown.

== Distribution ==
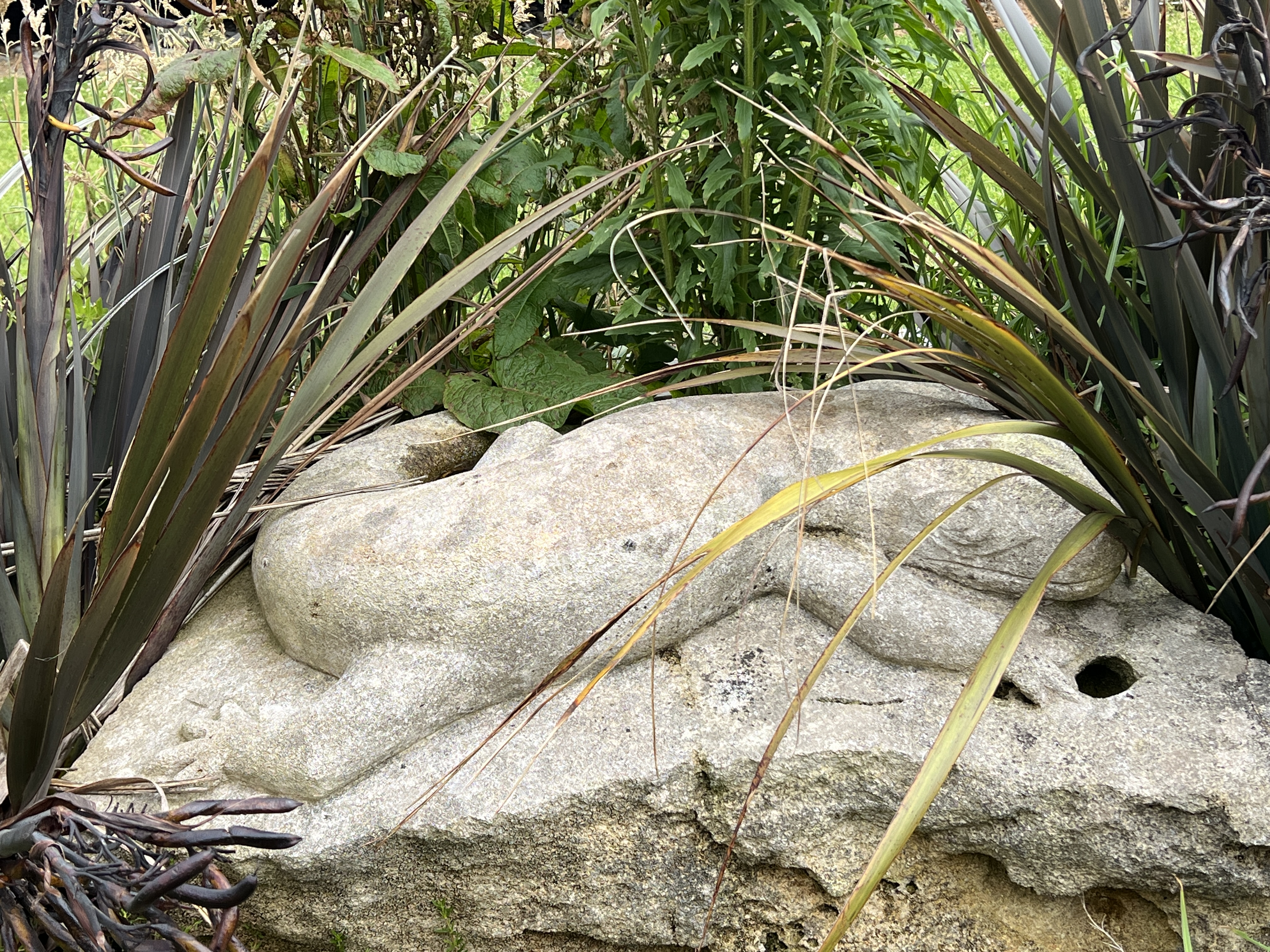
"Te Moko Moko", a sculpture of a cobble skink carved by Merv Jury from Charleston limestone, in the grounds of Granity School

Initially the species was noted as occurring at a beach in northern Westland, and just north of the Grey River. Subsequent surveys revealed that cobble skinks were found only on a short stretch of coast at Granity – literally, "behind the Granity Pub" – living alongside typical speckled skinks. They inhabit deep cobblestones just above the high-tide mark, at the point where the native groundcover pohuehue (Muehlenbeckia complexa) meets the beach. This habitat was likely once much more widespread along the West Coast, so cobble skinks were probably once abundant.

By 2025, further populations, one believed to be in excess of 22,000 individuals, had been discovered in nearby coastal areas. A media release from the New Zealand Department of Conservation quoted a member of staff, saying that "the situation is not as dire as originally thought."

== Conservation ==
At the time of its discovery, the cobble skink was locally very abundant, but cryptic and seldom coming into the open. When surveyed in 2015 to gather samples for genetic analysis, its range and habitat had declined significantly. Further surveys along the coast found no other populations. It was classified in late 2015 under the New Zealand Threat Classification System as 'Nationally Critical', occupying less than 1 ha of habitat. In early 2016, the population was estimated to be 30–40 individuals.

Cobble skink numbers have likely been reduced by introduced predators, and their habitat is also threatened by introduced weeds: these stabilise the cobbles and prevent storm surges from throwing stones up the beach, instead creating a bank. The habitat is also threatened by erosion; a January 2016 report stated that the entire coastline at Granity was retreating by 60–80 cm/year. Given the likelihood of storms in the winter of 2016 completely destroying the last of their habitat, the New Zealand Department of Conservation captured as many skinks as possible and housed the entire population – possibly the entire species – at Auckland Zoo, until they could be returned to a suitable coastal habitat.

Following the discovery of further populations of the species, the captive population was returned to the wild in January 2025.
