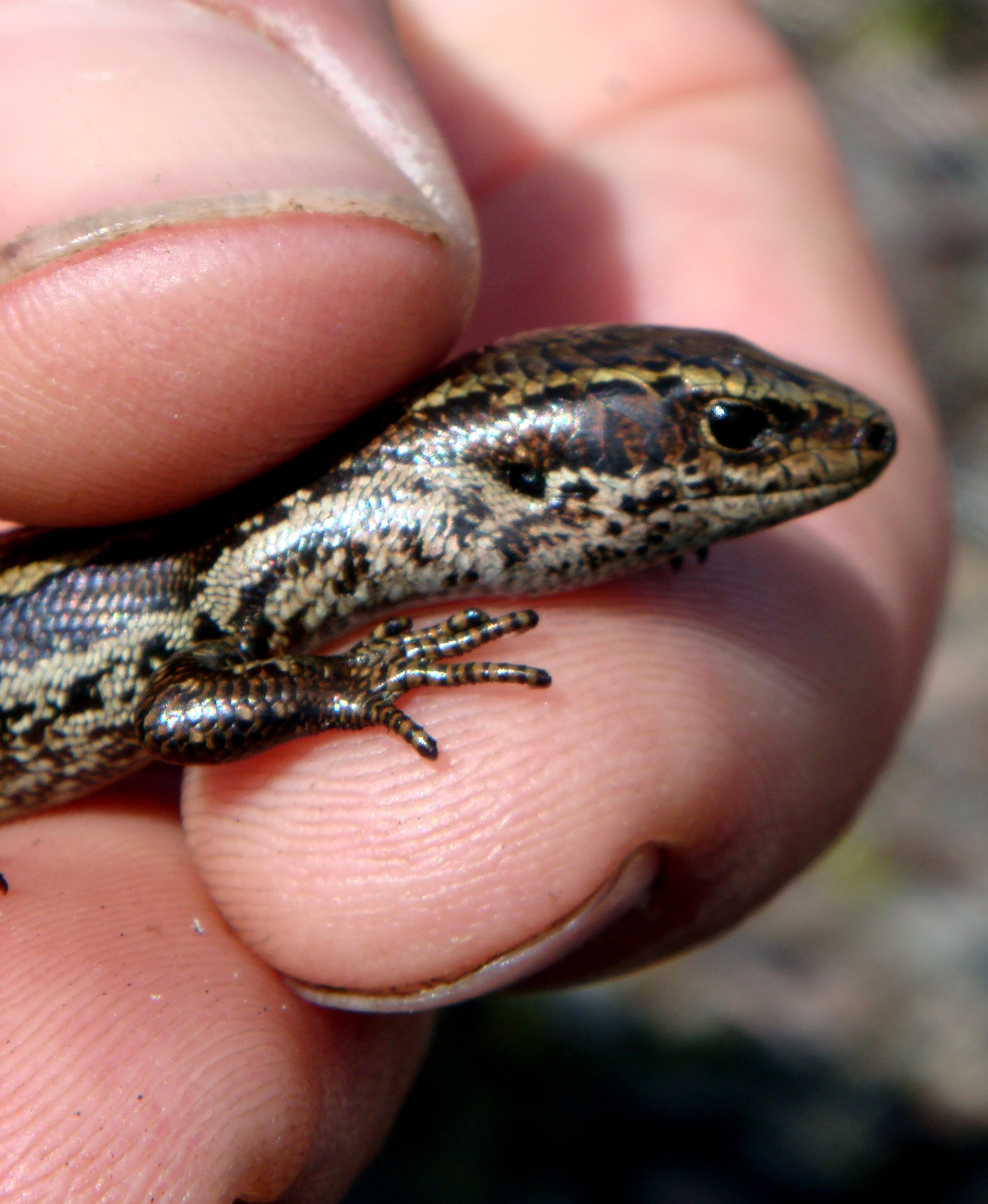

Conservation status
- Critically Endangered (IUCN 3.1)

Scientific classification
- Kingdom: Animalia
- Phylum: Chordata
- Class: Reptilia
- Order: Squamata
- Family: Scincidae
- Genus: Oligosoma
- Species: O. infrapunctatum

Binomial name
- Oligosoma infrapunctatum (Boulenger, 1887)

= Oligosoma infrapunctatum =

Species of lizard

Oligosoma infrapunctatum, the speckled skink, is a species of skink in the family Scincidae. It is endemic to New Zealand.

The speckled skink is classified under the New Zealand Threat Classification System as being in 'gradual decline'. However, evidence indicates that this classification refers to a complex of closely related species, and the actual O. infrapunctatum may be highly endangered or even extinct.

== Distribution ==
Oligosoma infrapunctatum is a widespread but patchily distributed skink with a distribution spanning the North Island from the Bay of Plenty south, and the South Island in the Marlborough Sounds, Nelson and Westland regions. It occurs in open forest, scrubland and tussock grassland from sea level to the subalpine zone, on boulder beaches in the Westland region of the South Island and occasionally in farmland and other modified habitats.

== Biogeography ==
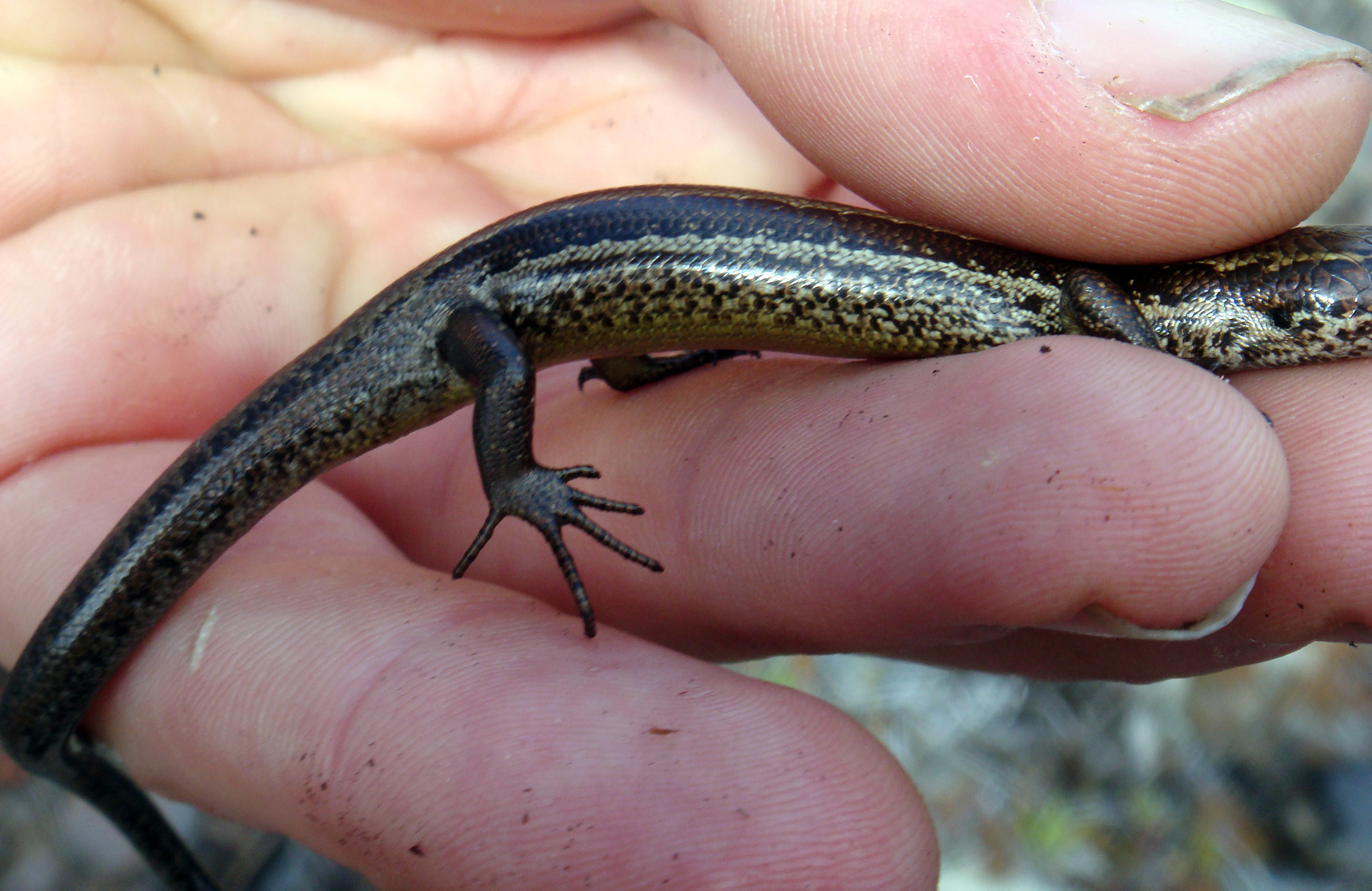
The speckled skink.

Recent genetic studies showed deep genetic divisions within O. infrapunctatum indicating that it is probably a complex of cryptic species which diverged in the Pliocene. A recent paper showed that Oligosoma infrapunctatum could be extinct, and that the widespread species in the Oligosoma infrapunctatum group should be called Oligosoma newmani
