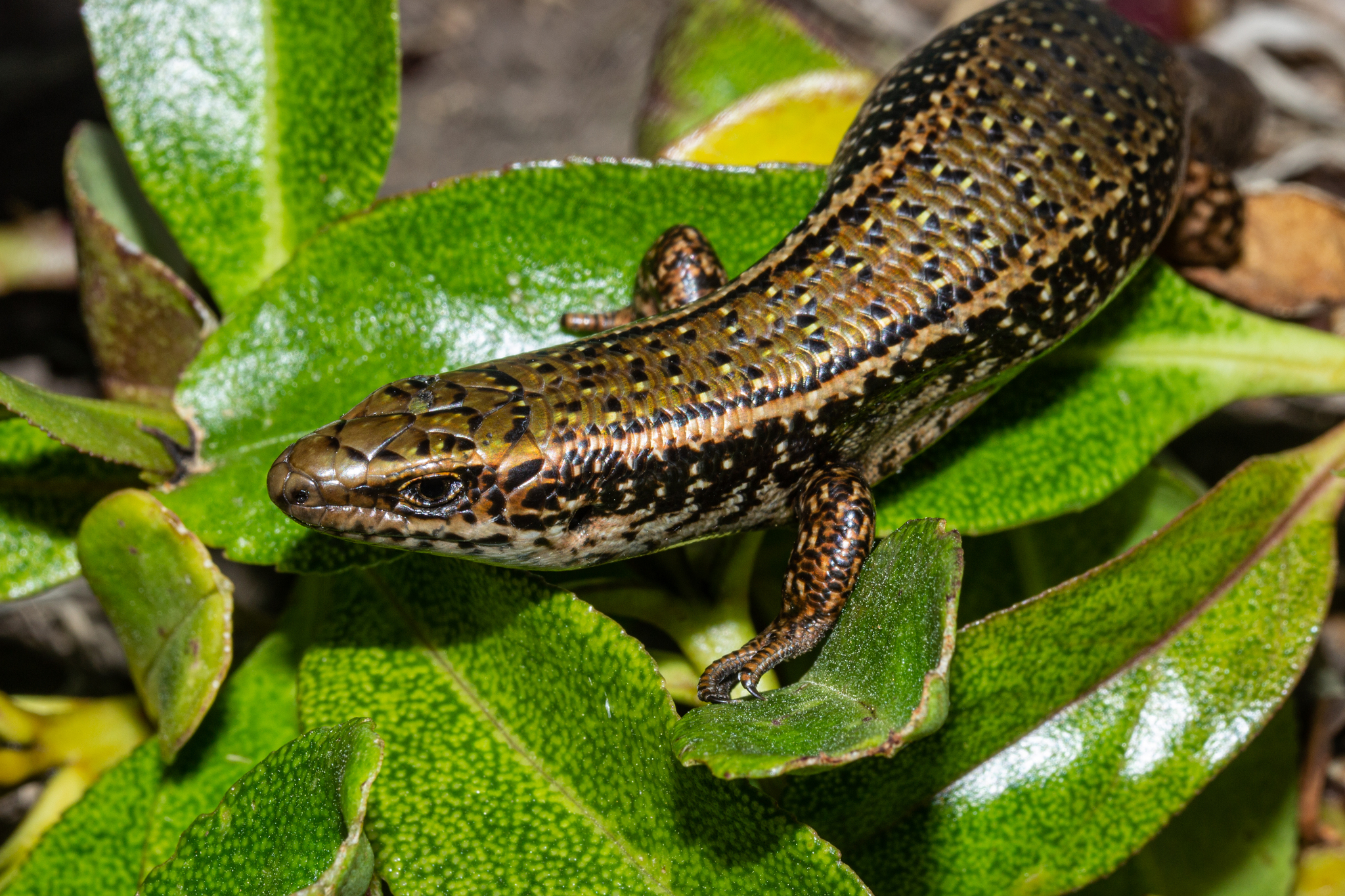

Conservation status
- Endangered (IUCN 3.1)

Scientific classification
- Kingdom: Animalia
- Phylum: Chordata
- Class: Reptilia
- Order: Squamata
- Family: Scincidae
- Genus: Oligosoma
- Species: O. lineoocellatum

Binomial name
- Oligosoma lineoocellatum Dumeril, 1851
- Distribution of the Canterbury spotted skink on a map of the South Island Known native range

= Canterbury spotted skink =

Species of lizard

Oligosoma lineoocellatum, commonly known as the Canterbury spotted skink, is one of a species complex of several related spotted skink species from New Zealand.

== Taxonomy ==
The Canterbury spotted skink Oligosoma lineoocellatum is one of a species complex of several related spotted skink species in New Zealand.

The four species within this complex are the Canterbury spotted skink O. lineoocellatum sensu stricto, the Mackenzie skink Oligosoma prasinum, the Marlborough spotted skink Oligosoma elium, and the Northern spotted skink Oligosoma kokowai.

These species are very morphologically similar; however, are distinguished by their differences in geographic distribution and genetic differences.

== Identification ==
The Canterbury spotted skink is a large, eye-catching skink with a snout-vent length reaching up to 107mm. Individuals typically have an olive-green, brown or brown-grey dorsal (upper side) surface with light and dark coloured spots (ocelli) which extend almost to the tail tip. Some individuals have also been found to have light dorsolateral stripes stretching from above the eye to the beginning of the tail. The lateral (side) surface exhibits a dark brown or brown-black lateral band with specks and white edges notched, extending from the front of the eyes to the tail tip. A thin pale stripe runs beneath this, transitioning into intermittent patches of cream and dark brown on the lower side surface. The ventral (underside) surface of the skink is grey in uniform, flushed with orange or pink, with a pale chin and throat covered in dark spots. Individuals have dark brown eyes with an intact tail longer than the snout-vent length. The Canterbury spotted skink has cream or grey soles on its feet with 21–25 subdigital lamellae (scales underneath fingers or toes).

There are several skinks that closely resemble the Canterbury spotted skink which can make it more challenging to identify them. The Mackenzie skink and Marlborough spotted skink are similar species; however, this is differentiated by the Canterbury spotted skink usually having more than 24 subdigital lamellae and the ocelli markings on the dorsal surface running down the tail. The uniformly grey underside, the greater ratio of snout-vent length to head-width and the different geographic locations differentiate the Canterbury spotted skink from the Northern spotted skink. Members of the Oligosoma chloronoton species complex (green skinks) also appear similar to the Canterbury spotted skink; however, the Canterbury spotted skink usually has more than 22 subdigital lamellae compared to the green skinks and features fewer anterior subocular scales (below the eyes) of similar sizes.

== Geographic distribution and habitat ==
The Canterbury spotted skink is an endemic species of skink only found in the Canterbury region of New Zealand. This distribution spreads from Mount Grey in the north, Banks Peninsula in the east, and the Rangitata River in the south. This species may also be seen further south in Canterbury. O. lineoocellatum can be found in various environments including lowland, coastal, montane/subalpine and alpine. These also vary in altitude from sea level up to 1400m. In these environments, the Canterbury spotted skink has been found in a wide range of habitats. These are grasslands, rock piles, boulder and cobble beaches, dune shrubland, flaxland, edges of forest scree slopes, fellfields, stony coasts and riverbeds, herbfields, and vinelands.

== Life cycle and phenology ==
The Canterbury spotted skink is diurnal meaning it is active during the day. It is also heliothermic (gains heat from the sun) so spends a lot of time basking in the sun. Mating occurs at the beginning of autumn and females are viviparous (live bearing). Breeding occurs once per year with pregnancies lasting 4–5 months ending between February and March. The average clutch size (number of offspring produced) of 3.82 (+/-0.18). The mating system of the Canterbury spotted skink is widely unknown. Research has been done on Oligosoma grande where observations suggested mating was polygynous (one male with multiple females) However, genetic studies of this species found that over one breeding season, both males and females had more than one partner using a promiscuous mating system.

Population modelling has been done on a population of the McCann’s skink Oligosoma maccanni, at Kaitorete Spit in Canterbury. This study categorised the different life stages of the skink based on their snout-vent-length (SVL). McCann’s skinks born within the same year have an SVL between 25-39mm, juveniles were between 40-48mm SVL, and adults had an SVL greater than 49mm, respectively. For O. lineoocellatum, it has been assumed the age of maturity is 4 years, with a life expectancy of 10 years. Monitored populations have shown an ongoing decline with a predicted decline of more than 70% over the next 10 years or three generations.

== Diet, prey and predators ==
Individuals of O. lineoocellatum display an active foraging behaviour meaning they are actively searching for prey instead of waiting for it to come to them. The Canterbury spotted skink is omnivorous feeding on both plant and animal material. A study found Oligochaeta (earthworms), Coleoptera (beetles), Hymenoptera (wasps and bees), Diplopoda (millipedes) and Lepidoptera (butterflies and moths) were the highest sources of prey for O. lineoocellatum. Seeds and fruit were also found in their diet, but were present in a lower percent of stomachs of the skinks surveyed. Other sources of food include nectar and smaller lizards including other Canterbury spotted skinks. Although O. lineoocellatum is diurnal, the findings from the study show their main prey species are nocturnal suggesting they may also forage at night.

In New Zealand, 50 species have been recorded predating on lizards with 51% of these being birds. Introduced mammals such as rats, hedgehogs and cats are also major predators of lizards.

Researchers have recorded multiple parasites on skinks within the spotted skink species complex. However, they have not yet determined exactly with which skink species each parasite is associated. These parasites recorded include trematodes: Dolichosaccus (Lecithopyge) leiolopismae, Paradisomum pacificus, cestodes: Oochoristica novaezealandicae, nematodes: Parathelandros sp.; Skrjabinodon trimorphi and protozoans: Haemogregarina sp.

== Other information ==
The Canterbury spotted skink is classified as “threatened- nationally critical” under the New Zealand Threat Classification system. Population estimates suggest there are between 1,000 – 5,000 mature individuals left and this is predicted to decline over three generations by 10-50%. The biggest threats to the Canterbury spotted skink are invasive mammalian predators and habitat loss due to land use change.

New Zealand lizards are important seed dispersers and can assist with dispersal in areas where fruigivorous (feeding on fruit) birds are not present. Studies have also found that lizards can be effective pollinators.
