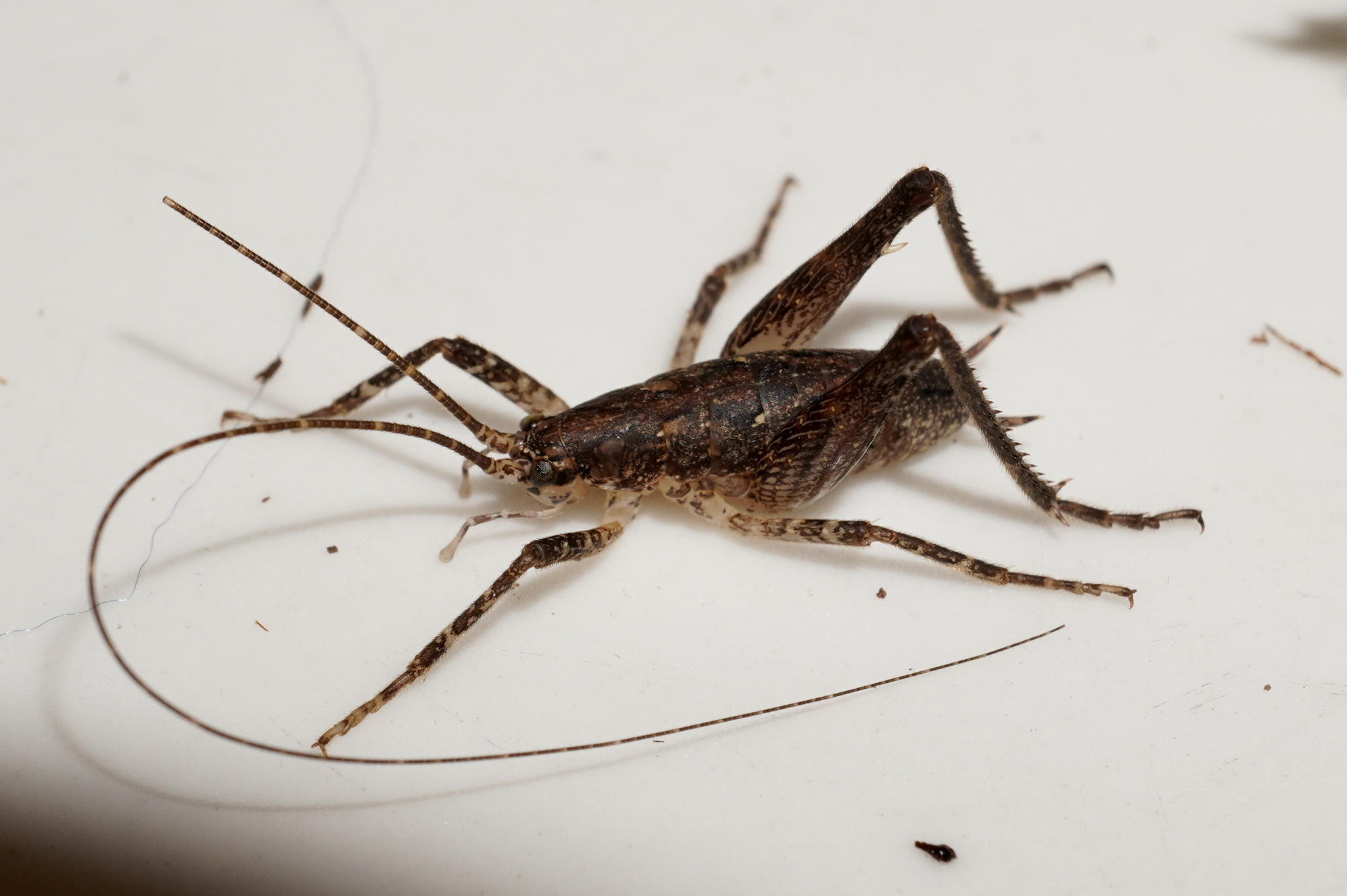
- Isoplectron armatum

Scientific classification
- Kingdom: Animalia
- Phylum: Arthropoda
- Clade: Pancrustacea
- Class: Insecta
- Order: Orthoptera
- Suborder: Ensifera
- Family: Rhaphidophoridae
- Subfamily: Macropathinae
- Genus: Isoplectron; Hutton 1896

Species
- See text.

Synonyms
- Petrotettix

= Isoplectron =

Genus of orthopteran insects

Isoplectron is a genus of cave wētā in the family Rhaphidophoridae with eight species recognised. The genus is endemic to New Zealand and distributed throughout most of the country but has not been recorded north of Taupo.

== Taxonomy and morphology ==
The genus Isoplectron was described by Hutton in 1896. All species in this genus are small in size (10-17mm body length) and are commonly misidentified. The fore femora of the Isoplectron does not contain apical spines, in addition, the hind tibiae models two pairs of apical spines. Adult females have a broad bilobed subgenital plate while males have a triangular shape. Five new species were described in 2024 and two species were moved from the genera Petrotettix and Setascutum.

=== Isoplectron armatum ===
Isoplectron armatum are the most commonly observed species of Isoplectron. They are found across New Zealand with the subspecies I. a. armatum in South Island and subspecies I. a. aciculatum in North Island. These Rhaphidophoridae are arboreal and during the day can be found in dry spaces under bark or in holes of various trees, especially Nothofagus cliffortioides and kanuka and in artificial refugia (wētā boxes). They are also caught in pitfall traps in southern North Island forests. Their morphology consists of a body length between 11-17mm, short dorsal and laterals in the hind tibial apical spurs, a very small ventral pair of hind tibial apical spurs and no spinules in the hind tarsal plantulae. This is consistent across males and females. All adult males have a conspicuous curved spine on the retrolateral inferior edge of their hind femur.

=== Isoplectron pallidum ===
Described by Aola Richards in 1972 from a single female specimen and moved from the genus Setascutum to Isoplectron in 2024. This is the smallest Isoplecton species. Isoplectron pallidum is found in sub alpine and alpine rock tors and in montane forest under bark in Otago.

== Species ==
- Isoplectron armatum armatum Hutton, 1897
- Isoplectron armatum aciculatum Karny, 1937
- Isoplectron bicolor Hegg, Morgan-Richards & Trewick, 2024
- Isoplectron ferratum Hegg, Morgan-Richards & Trewick, 2024
- Isoplectron maculatum Hegg, Morgan-Richards & Trewick, 2024
- Isoplectron parallelum Hegg, Morgan-Richards & Trewick, 2024
- Isoplectron pallidum (Richards, 1972)
- Isoplectron serratum (Richards, 1972)
- Isoplectron virgatum Hegg, Morgan-Richards & Trewick, 2024

== Predation ==
A study conducted by Bremner et al. (1989) compared insect response to disturbance (touch) between individuals living with mammalian predators and those on mammal-free islands. Wētā were observed to jump away or leap off tree branches when disturbed in environments with rodents, but were more likely to move away without haste in environments without rodents. The paper concluded that invertebrate populations, specifically the Isoplectron sp. population in Fiordland, altered their behaviour in environments that contained predators such as stoats (Mustela erminea) and ship rats (Rattus rattus) in comparison to predator free environments. Individuals within the genus Isoplectron are eaten by endemic reptiles such as the Tuatara (Sphenodon punctatus), spotted skink (Oligosoma kokowai) and Pacific geckos (Dactylocnemis pacificus) as well as avian species such as Rifleman (Acanthissitta chloris), Ruru (Ninox novaeseelandiae), Kākā (Nestor meridionalis) and Tīeke (Philesturnus).

== Conservation ==
All species within the genus Isoplectron are considered not threatened and are consequently of little conservation concern.
