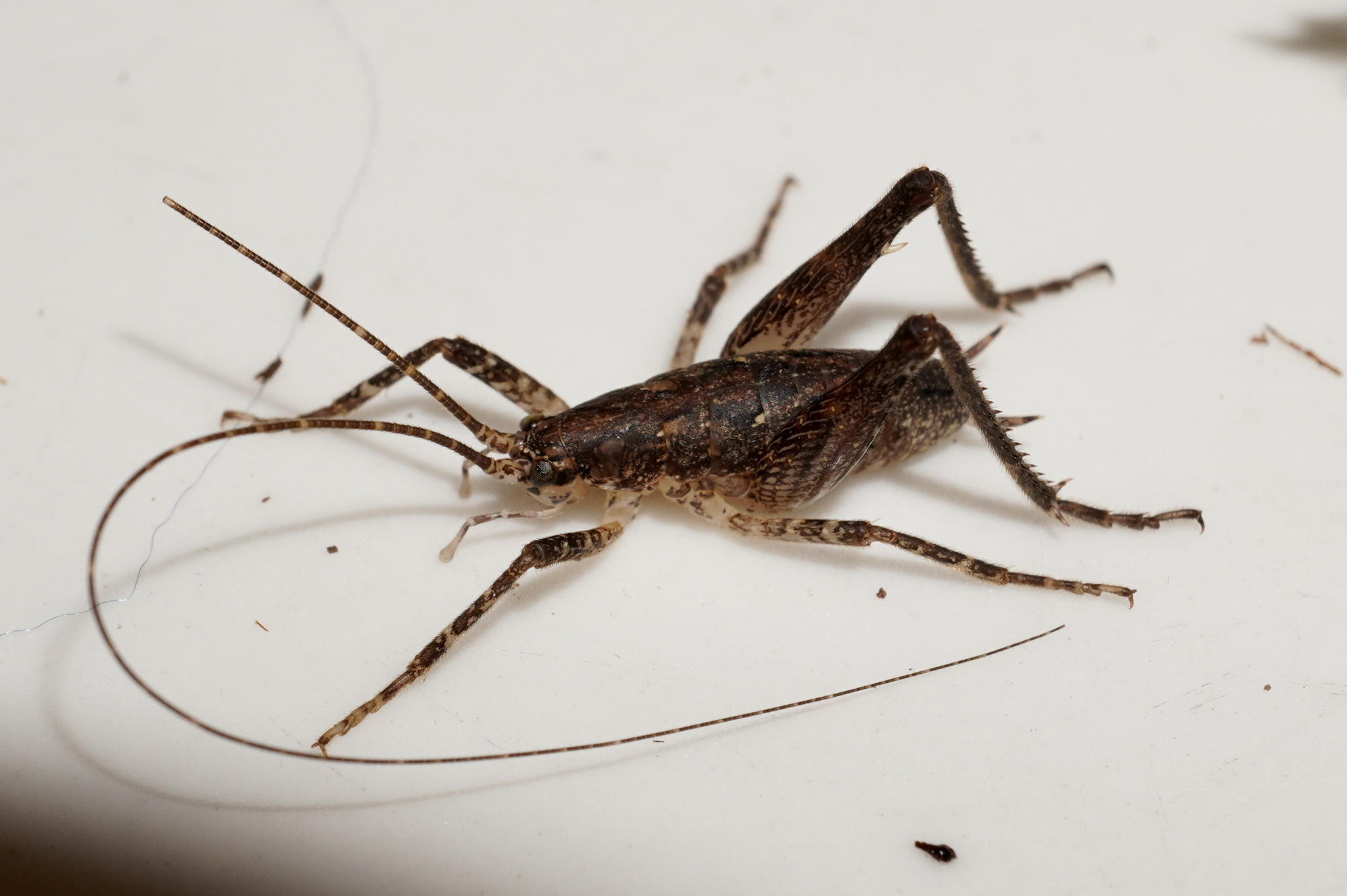

Conservation status
- Not Threatened (NZ TCS)

Scientific classification
- Kingdom: Animalia
- Phylum: Arthropoda
- Clade: Pancrustacea
- Class: Insecta
- Order: Orthoptera
- Suborder: Ensifera
- Family: Rhaphidophoridae
- Genus: Isoplectron
- Species: I. armatum

Binomial name
- Isoplectron armatum Hutton, 1897

= Isoplectron armatum =

Species of orthopteran insect

Isoplectron armatum is a species of tokoriro (cave wētā) that is endemic to New Zealand.

== Taxonomy ==
This species was described by Hutton in June 1897 from a single adult male specimen from Dunedin. The name "armatum" is from the latin 'armed' (equipped with weapons) and refers to the conspicuous spine under the hind femur of adult males.

In 1938 Heinrich Hugo Karny described Isoplectron aciculatum from a male specimen from North Island New Zealand. In 2024 three species were shown to be synonymous with Isoplectron armatum, which was divided into two sub-species.

== Description ==
The body is coloured light rusty brown, darkly marbled dorsally. The abdomen and thorax have dark markings and eyes are green. As adults their bodies are 8.5 - 16.8mm long.

== Distribution ==
This species is only known from New Zealand. Isoplectron armatum is the most common species in the genus and found south of Taupō in the North Island (sub-species I. a. aciculatum) and throughout South Island (sub-species I. a. armatum). During the day this species can be found hiding under tree bark or inside artificial refugia, often in groups of up to ten individuals.

== Conservation status ==
Under the New Zealand Threat Classification System, this species is listed as "Not Threatened"
