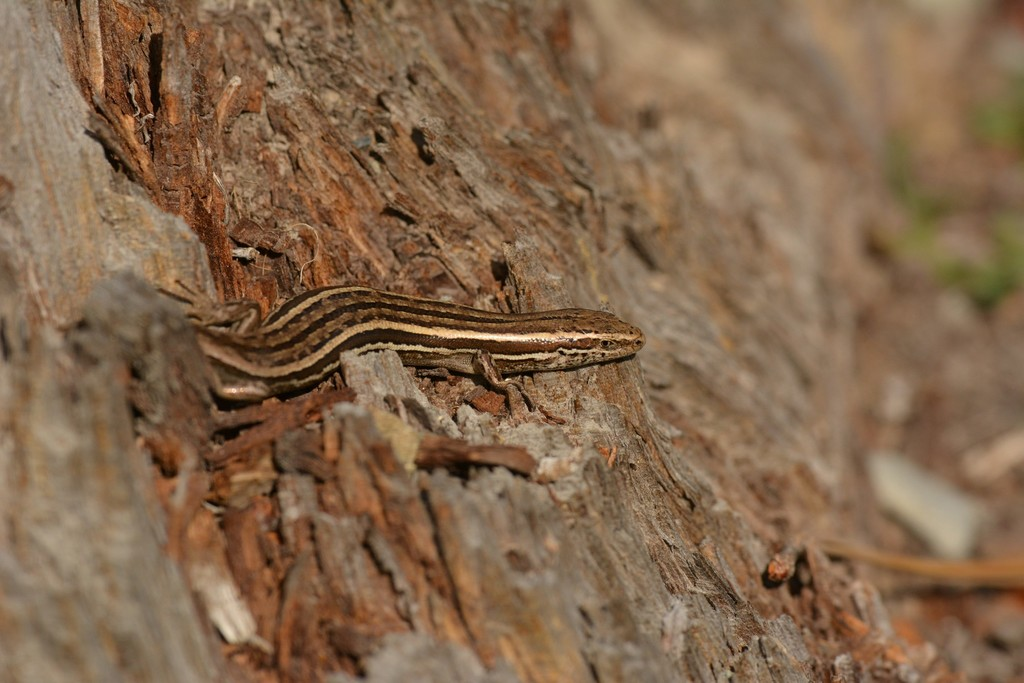

Scientific classification
- Kingdom: Animalia
- Phylum: Chordata
- Class: Reptilia
- Order: Squamata
- Family: Scincidae
- Genus: Oligosoma
- Species: O. maccanni

Binomial name
- Oligosoma maccanni (Hardy, 1977)
- Distribution of McCann's skink on a map of the South Island Known native range

= McCann's skink =

Species of lizard

The McCann's skink (Oligosoma maccanni) is a species of skink native to New Zealand.

== Identification ==
Oligosoma maccanni can be identified due to their physical features these include but are not limited to an oval shaped body (in cross section), a pointed head, a long tail which tapers downwards, and comparatively long limbs and toes.

McCann's skinks have shiny scales on their skin, they also have two pale and key dorsolateral lines. The O. maccanni 's dorsal stripe does not extend to the end of the tail. The only presence of speckling on the body is under the chin, the O. maccanni 's also have a well-defined pale dorsolateral strip.

McCann's skink have a slim and beautiful figure. In particular, the width of its neck is almost the same as that of the head. It has creamy-grey, yellow or brown soles of the feet and belly. The throat often has fine black speckling. It was discovered by Patterson and Daugherty (1995) that this species had a transparent palpebral disc which was composed of small and rectangular granules which cover its lower eyelid. The background colour of McCann's skink's body is grey-brown with smooth patterns of brown strips. Some of them have grey spots spread along the strips which make a herringbone pattern.

Additionally, there is a morphological variation in McCann's skinks. It was found that McCann's skinks have stripes in Canterbury, but have speckles in Otago. There is also a piece of evidence about the dorsal patterning as it may decrease the risk of being caught by avian predators because most of them mainly rely on vision to prey.

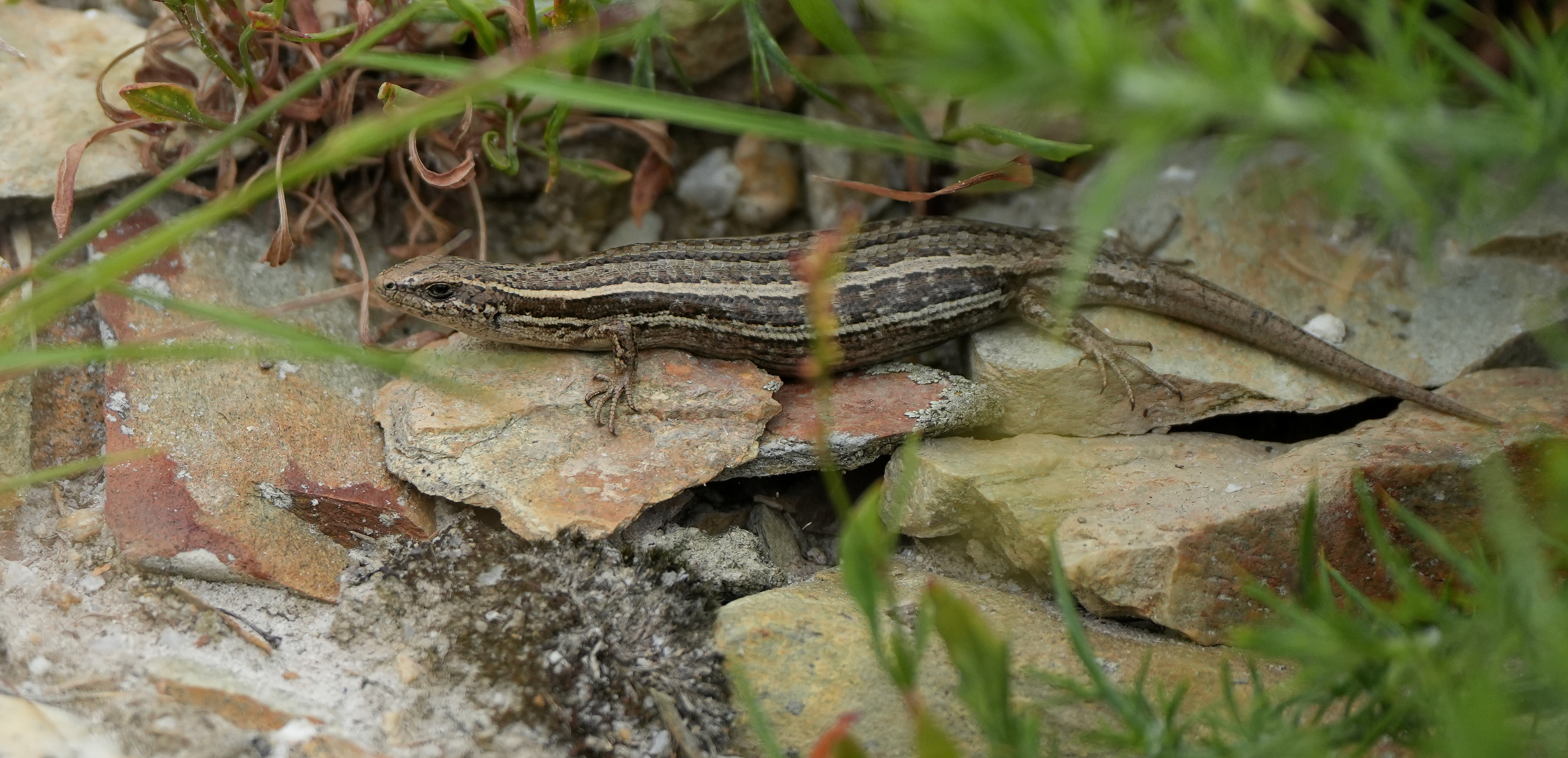
McCann's Skink at St Bathans, Central Otago. This one is likely gravid, and shows the speckled markings characteristic of this species in Otago.

== Geographic distribution and habitat ==
=== Natural global range ===
Oligosoma maccanni are endemic to New Zealand which means they only exist in one geographic region.

=== New Zealand range ===
Within New Zealand Oligosoma maccanni are located in the South Island. Predominantly in the south eastern section of the island. These being in the regions of Marlborough, Canterbury, Otago, and Southland. It was also reported by Patterson and Daugherty (1990) that McCann's skinks were widespread in Canterbury and Otago where significant land use change, habitat destruction and fragmentation have. Besides, they are spread mostly inland but also live coastal Otago and Bank Peninsula areas.

=== Habitat ===
Oligosoma maccanni prefer habitat which is coastal, and or consists of rocky ground as the McCann's skink finds refuge in small cracks between rocks. The McCann's skink hides itself and its young in between and under rocks for protection from predators, and to achieve solar gain by absorbing heat through the rocks during the day time. However, if there are few rocks available, McCann's skinks would shelter inside vegetation with low soil development like herbs and shrubs. For example, they choose to shelter inside Aciphylla spp., as there are long spiny leaves which could provide the perfect protection to O. maccanni . Besides, some skinks in coastal Canterbury areas prefer staying and using marram grass because they could make the habitat in Kaikorete spit get connected with dune vegetation, like Pingao.

Oligosoma maccanni have a preference to open habitat areas, these include areas of native and introduced grass and shrubland including divaricating shrubs such as Discaria toumatoua, Coprosma propinqua, and Muehlenbeckia astonii. Thus, their broad habitat preferences are likely to reduce the vulnerable rates of their population.

== Life cycle/ phenology ==
=== Mating and breeding stage ===
McCann's skinks are viviparous and this reproductive process is understood to be an adaptation of Lizards that are endemic to cool climatic regions of the world like New Zealand. New Zealand lizards are typically known to have a long duration of life, with delayed process to reach maturity and a low rate of reproductive success. In particular, the development of embryos have a slow-growth stage during the first three months when compared with later stages during the reproductive process. Additionally, females are annual spring-summer breeders with a 4–5 months' incubation period. During the period of pregnancy, their clutch size may decrease due to a lack of fertilization. It was reported that during the mating period of vitellogenesis which means McCann's skinks mate in autumn season and discharge ovules in spring, male McCann's skinks’ sperms must be stored inside female's reproductive tract for several months to have reproductive success.

=== Juvenile McCann's skinks ===
It was demonstrated by Patterson and Daugherty (1990) that young McCann's skinks were usually born in late January and the end of February in Central Otago. However, according to the study from Kaitorete Spit, it was found that O. maccanni was born from the first week in December through to February and in the present study, the majority of new-born McCann's skinks were born during mid-December and late January. Because of their relatively large home ranges which are around 8 m^{2} in area, these juvenile skinks are highly likely to have aggressive behaviors within or towards other lizard species, defending their particular sites.

=== Activity pattern ===
As active diurnal predators, they keep a high body temperature during daytime by being heated from solar rays. Therefore, the O. maccanni 's activity peaks early in the morning, foraging a variety of invertebrates and fruits.

== Diet/ prey/ predators ==
=== Diet and foraging ===
Oligosoma maccanni are dietary generalists which means they can live in a wide variety of environmental conditions by using different resources as their food sources. McCann's skinks prefer consuming Hemipteran (true bugs) and Araneae (spiders), and due to their diurnal activity pattern, insects become important food. The O. maccanni which live in Central Otago are mainly insectivorous which means insects are the most significant food in their life followed by spiders and some fruits. Besides, this they have been recorded to eat other skinks and carrion but they will avoid preying on ants as a food source. Additionally, some fleshy fruit from divaricating shrubs are also a staple in their diet these include Discaria toumatoua, Coprosma propinqua, and Muehlenbeckia astonii fruit.

=== Predators, parasites and diseases ===
==== Predators- introduced mammals ====
Introduced mammalian predators are a threat to the population of New Zealand endemic skinks. If mammalian predators were controlled well, it might increase the population of small terrestrial lizards, including McCann's skinks. Avian predators, like swamp harriers (Circus approximans), Australian magpies (Gymnorhina tibicen), little owls (Athene noctua) and blackbirds (Turdus merula) are common lizard predators. According to the analysis of hedgehog diet, 12.5 per cent of hedgehog's scats relates to McCann's skinks. Even the result data is relatively few, the influence of hedgehogs is still high for McCann's skinks because hedgehogs have larger population density than cats and mustelids. Specifically, it was demonstrated that the juvenile population of McCann's skinks decreased with an increased number in the hedgehog community. In Central Otago within the contents of one feral cats guts 49 skinks were found, other research showed that stoats (Mustela erminea) would also prey on skinks from time to time. Additionally, during some autumn to early winter months, Oligosoma skinks are eaten by 20–25 per cent of mice.

==== Parasites- Odontacarus mites ====
Oligosoma maccanni are host to at least two species of parasitic mites, these being Odontacarus prostigmata and Odontacarus leeuwenhoekiidae. These mites become parasites to Oligosoma maccanni during the free-living adult part of their life cycle.

== Other information ==
=== Cultural significance ===
In New Zealand lizards/ ngarara hold cultural significance to the indigenous Maori people as they are identified as a treasure because of their association with death and the underworld.

=== Conservation status ===
As of 2012 the Department of Conservation (DOC) classified the McCann's Skink as a Non Threatened species which means this resident native taxa still have a large and stable population at present under the New Zealand Threat Classification System.

=== The background of its scientific name ===
The name of McCann's skinks refers to a vertebrate zoologist Charles McCann (1899–1980), and he is the first author of modifying New Zealand lizards.

McCann's skinks have a history of taxonomic reclassification. When Hardy identified the representative species of Leiolopisma nigriplantare maccanni, it was divided into five different species (inconspicuum, maccanni, microlepis, notosaurus) and subspecies of common skink (L. nigriplantare polychroma). In a study conducted by Patterson and Daugherty (1990), they reclassified McCann's skink's as Oligosoma maccanni.

=== A suitable lizard model ===
McCann's skinks are viviparous lizards meaning that they give birth to live young rather than eggs. During their gestation period the eggs hatch within the female Oligosoma maccanni’s oviduct. It is proposed that like the Oligosoma nigriplantare the Oligosoma maccanni grow a placenta and the hatched but not born embryos are nourished by this though development. They breed annually with similar length of vitellogenesis and pregnancy, therefore they are the suitable lizard model to develop assisted-breeding methods for other lizards that are classified as threatened.
