= Odotoncarus =

Scientific classification
- Domain: Eukaryota
- Kingdom: Animalia
- Phylum: Arthropoda
- Class: Insecta
- Order: Coleoptera
- Suborder: Adephaga
- Family: Carabidae
- Subfamily: Harpalinae
- Tribe: Harpalini
- Subtribe: Ditomina
- Genus: Odotoncarus; Solier, 1835

Synonyms
- Odontocarus Solier, 1835

Genus of beetles

Odotoncarus is a genus of ground beetles in the family Carabidae. There are seven described species in Odotoncarus.

== Species ==
These seven species belong to the genus Odotoncarus:

- Odotoncarus asiaticus (Chaudoir, 1852) (Mediterranean and the Middle East)
- Odotoncarus cephalotes (Dejean, 1826) (Morocco, Portugal, and Spain)
- Odotoncarus parilis (Dvorak, 1993) (Syria)
- Odotoncarus robustus (Dejean, 1830) (Albania and Greece)
- Odotoncarus samson (Reiche & Saulcy, 1855) (Middle East)
- Odotoncarus silvestrii (Gridelli, 1930) (Libya)
- Odotoncarus zarudnianus (Semenov & Znojko, 1929) (Iran)
