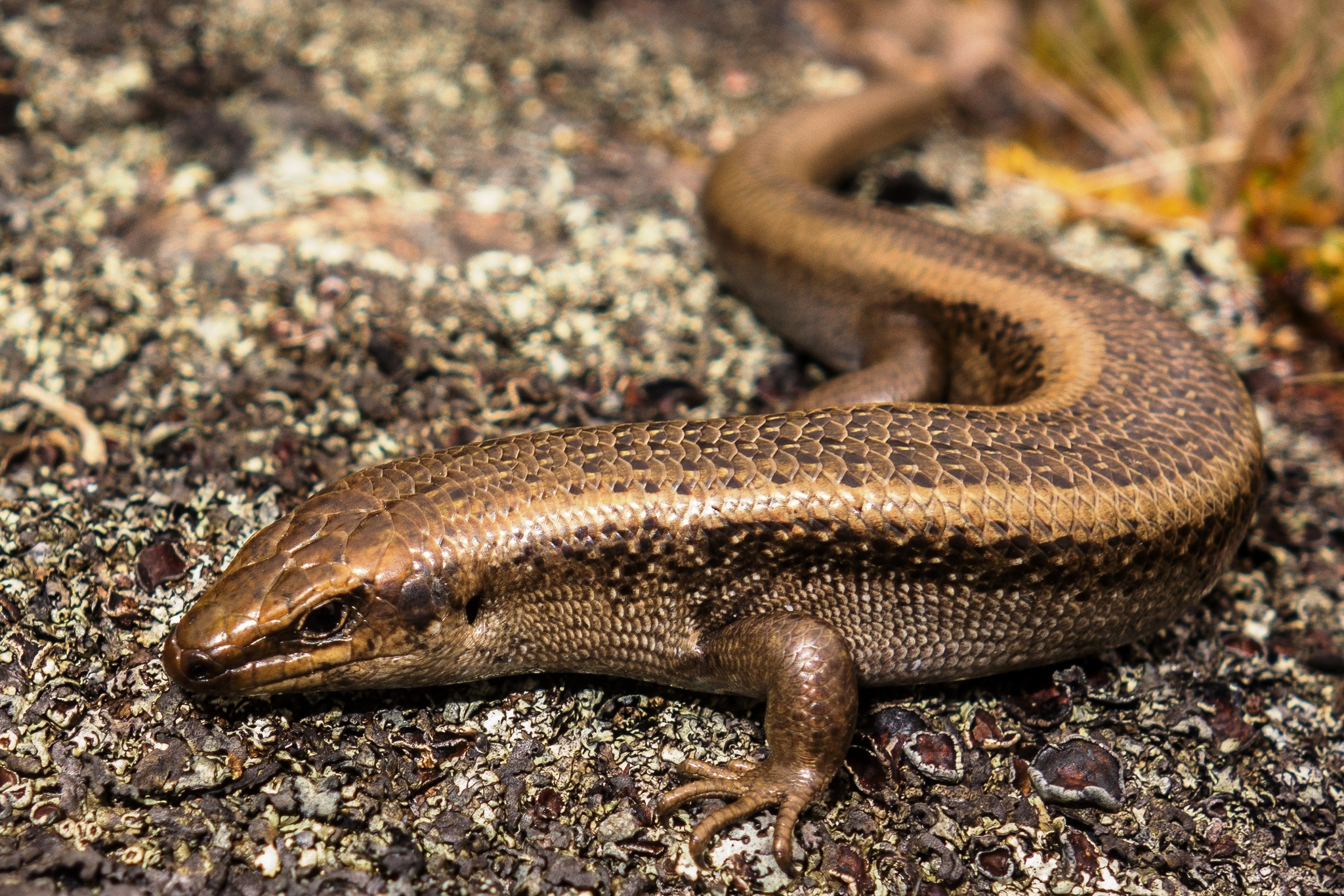
- Oligosoma prasinum seen in the Mackenzie District, New Zealand

Conservation status
- Endangered (IUCN 3.1)

Scientific classification
- Kingdom: Animalia
- Phylum: Chordata
- Class: Reptilia
- Order: Squamata
- Family: Scincidae
- Genus: Oligosoma
- Species: O. prasinum

Binomial name
- Oligosoma prasinum Melzer, Bell, & Patterson, 2017
- Distribution of Oligosoma prasinum on a map of the South Island Known native range

= Oligosoma prasinum =

Species of lizard

The Mackenzie skink (Oligosoma prasinum) is a species of skink found in New Zealand.
