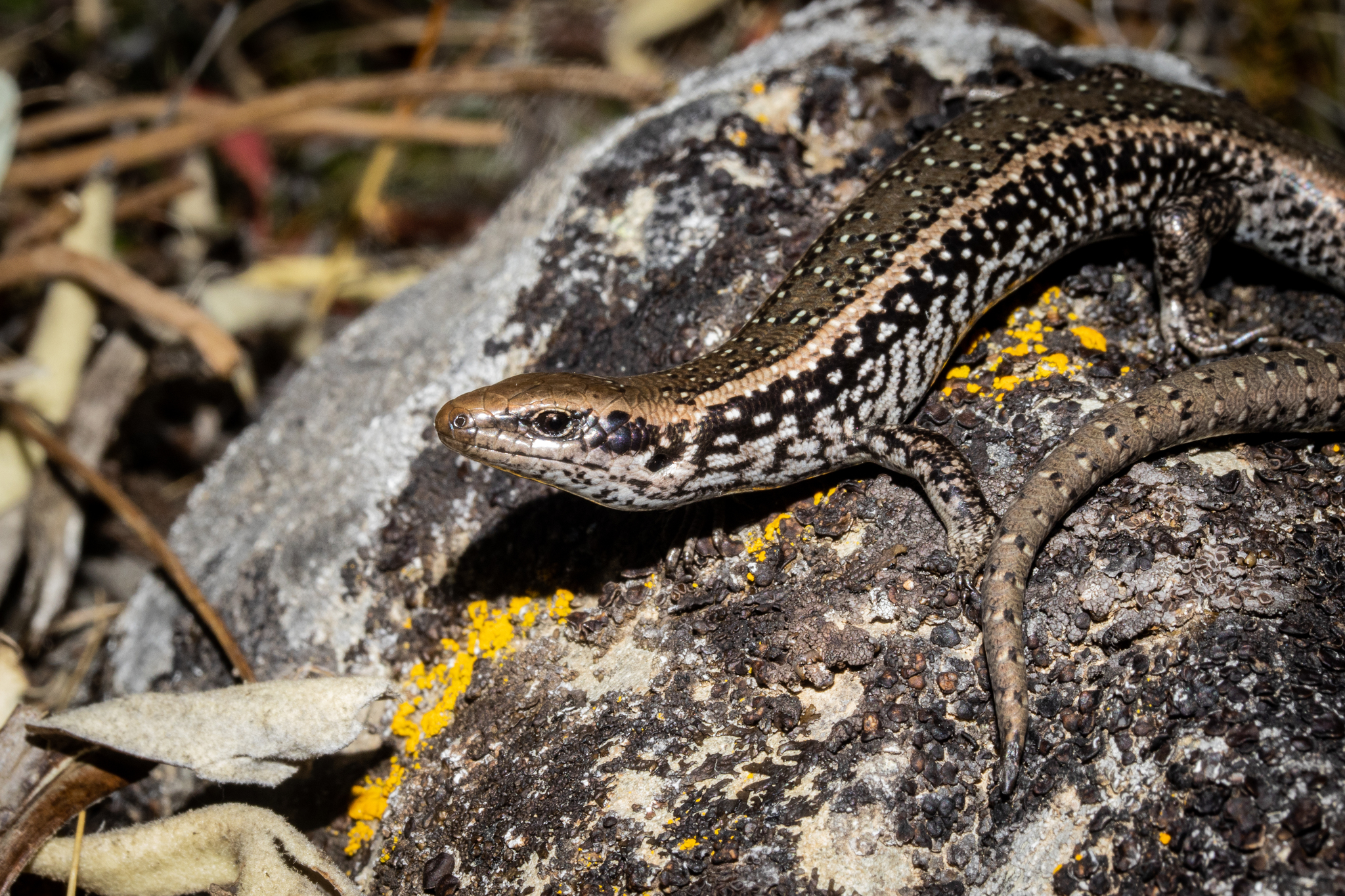
- Oligosoma elium seen in the Turk Ridge, Marlborough District, New Zealand

Conservation status
- Endangered (IUCN 3.1)

Scientific classification
- Kingdom: Animalia
- Phylum: Chordata
- Class: Reptilia
- Order: Squamata
- Family: Scincidae
- Genus: Oligosoma
- Species: O. elium

Binomial name
- Oligosoma elium Melzer, Bell, & Patterson, 2017
- Distribution of Oligosoma elium on a map of the South Island Known native range

= Oligosoma elium =

Species of lizard

Oligosoma elium, the Marlborough spotted skink, is a species of skink that is native to New Zealand.
