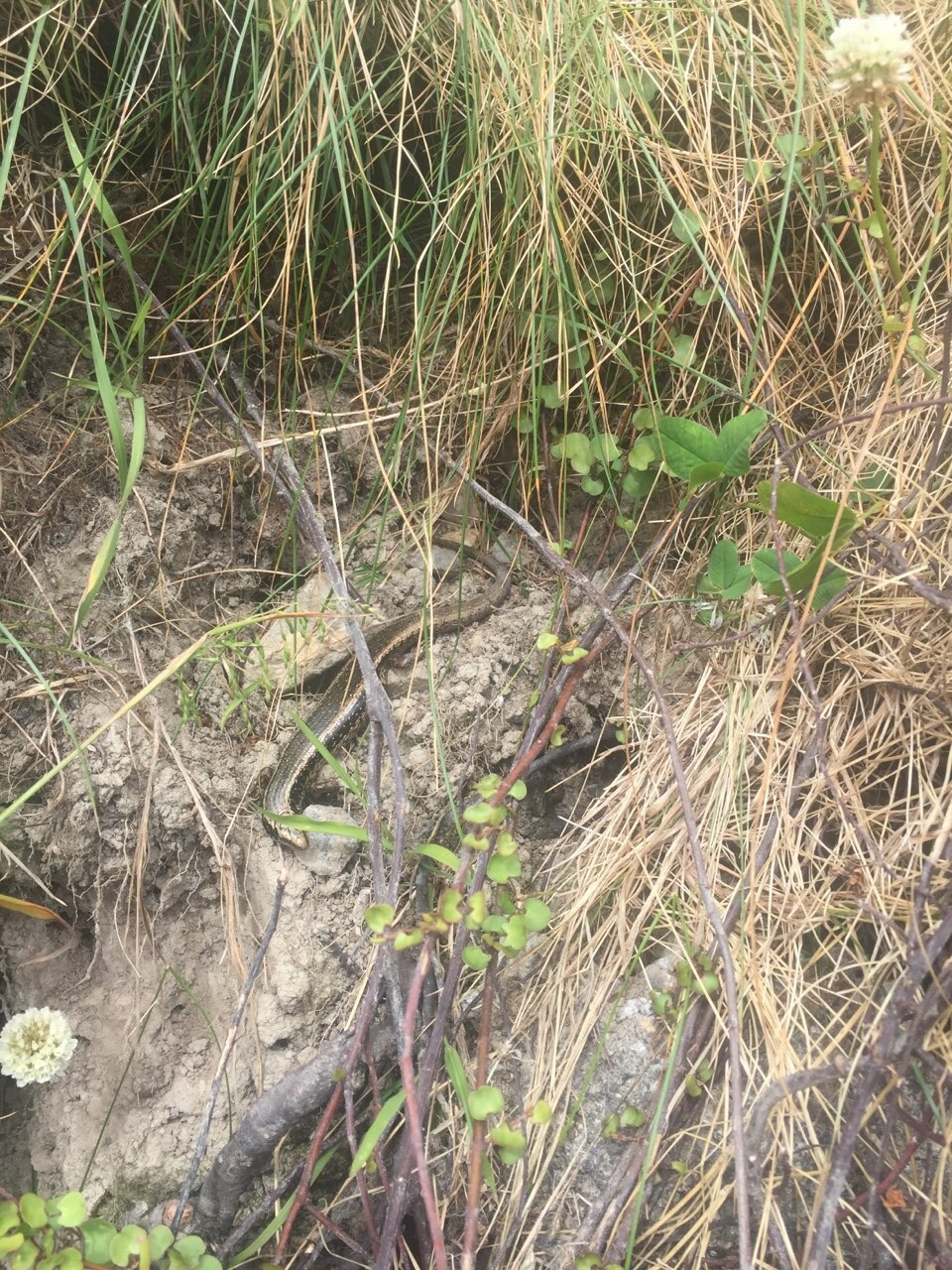
- An individual in the Wellington region

Scientific classification
- Kingdom: Animalia
- Phylum: Chordata
- Class: Reptilia
- Order: Squamata
- Family: Scincidae
- Genus: Oligosoma
- Species: O. kokowai

Binomial name
- Oligosoma kokowai Melzer, Bell, & Patterson, 2017
- Distribution of Oligosoma kokowai on a map of New Zealand Known native range

= Oligosoma kokowai =

Species of lizard

Oligosoma kokowai, the northern spotted skink, is a species of skink found in New Zealand.

It lives in the southern North Island and northern South Island, and those areas' offshore islands. A small, isolated population on the Napier coastline is the northern-most occurrence.
