= C7H12O =

The molecular formula C_{7}H_{12}O (molar mass 112.17 g/mol) may refer to:

- Cycloheptanone
- Methylcyclohexanone
- Norborneols
  - endo-Norborneol
  - exo-Norborneol
