= Norcamphor =

Names
- IUPAC name Bicyclo[2.2.1]heptan-2-one
- Other names 2-Norbornanone

Identifiers
CAS Number	497-38-1
3D model (JSmol)	Interactive image
ChEBI	CHEBI:232344
ChEMBL	ChEMBL361682
ChemSpider	9919
ECHA InfoCard	100.007.134
PubChem CID	10345
CompTox Dashboard (EPA)	DTXSID50883406
- InChI: InChI=1S/C7H10O/c8-7-4-5-1-2-6(7)3-5/h5-6H,1-4H2 Key: KPMKEVXVVHNIEY-UHFFFAOYSA-N; InChI=1/C7H10O/c8-7-4-5-1-2-6(7)3-5/h5-6H,1-4H2 Key: KPMKEVXVVHNIEY-UHFFFAOYAC
- SMILES: O=C1CC2CC1CC2

Properties
Chemical formula	C_{7}H_{10}O
Molar mass	110.156 g·mol^{−1}
Appearance	Colorless solid
Melting point	93 to 96 °C (199 to 205 °F; 366 to 369 K)
Boiling point	168 to 172 °C (334 to 342 °F; 441 to 445 K)
- Except where otherwise noted, data are given for materials in their standard state (at 25 °C [77 °F], 100 kPa). Infobox references

Norcamphor is an organic compound, classified as a bicyclic ketone. It is an analog of camphor, but without the three methyl groups. A colorless solid, it is used as a building block in organic synthesis.

== Synthesis and reactions ==
Norcamphor was prepared from a Diels-alder reaction of cyclopentadiene and vinyl acetate, followed by oxidation with chromic acid in acetic acid solution. A more recent synthesis produces norbornene via the 2-formate ester, oxidized with chromic acid in acetone. It is a precursor to norborneols. The enzymatically mediated Baeyer-Villiger oxidation of norcamphor gives the lactone.

== See also ==
- Norbornane
