= Vinyl norbornene =

Names
- IUPAC name 5-Ethenylbicyclo[2.2.1]hept-2-ene
- Other names 2-Ethylidene-5-norbornene; 5-Vinyl-2-norbornene

Identifiers
CAS Number	3048-64-4
3D model (JSmol)	Interactive image
ChEMBL	ChEMBL3186510
ChemSpider	17262
EC Number	221-259-8
PubChem CID	18273
UNII	O26JW4DH9I
CompTox Dashboard (EPA)	DTXSID6029250
- InChI: InChI=1S/C9H12/c1-2-8-5-7-3-4-9(8)6-7/h2-4,7-9H,1,5-6H2 Key: INYHZQLKOKTDAI-UHFFFAOYSA-N
- SMILES: C=CC1CC2CC1C=C2

Properties
Chemical formula	C_{9}H_{12}
Molar mass	120.195 g·mol^{−1}
Appearance	Colorless liquid
Boiling point	141 °C (286 °F; 414 K)
- Except where otherwise noted, data are given for materials in their standard state (at 25 °C [77 °F], 100 kPa). Infobox references

Vinyl norbornene (VNB) is an organic compound that consists of a vinyl group attached to norbornene. It is a colorless liquid. The compound exists as endo and exo isomers, but these are not typically separated. It is an intermediate in the production of the commercial polymer EPDM. It is prepared by the Diels–Alder reaction of butadiene and cyclopentadiene.

Vinyl norbornene is an intermediate in the production ethylidene norbornene.

== Safety ==
LD_{50} is 0.10–0.05 mg/kg (intravenous, female rabbit). It is also a neurotoxin.
