= Nadic anhydride =

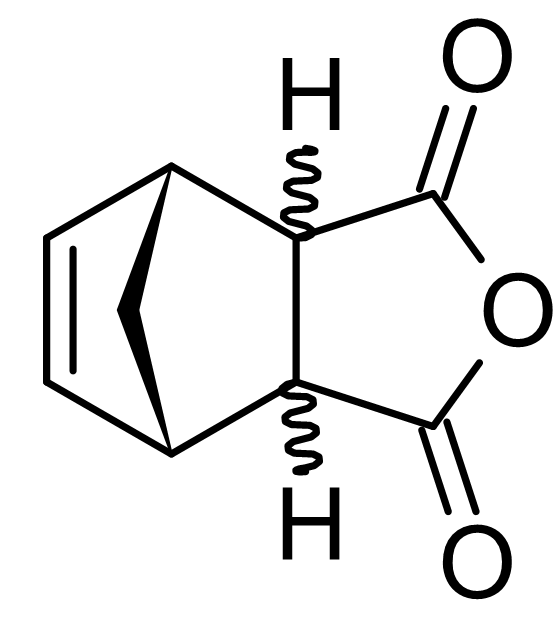
- Structural formula

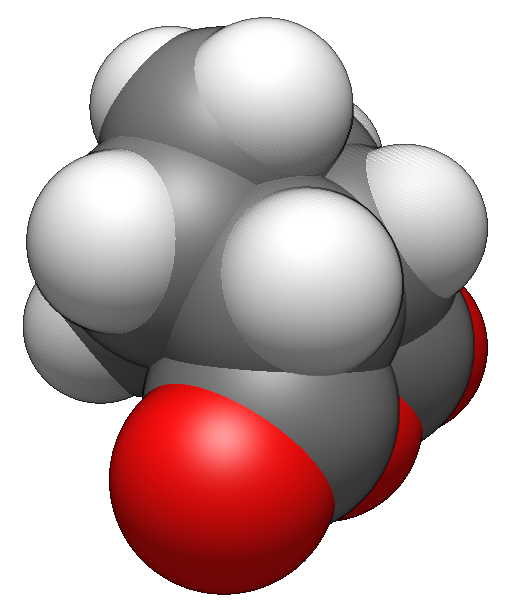
endo
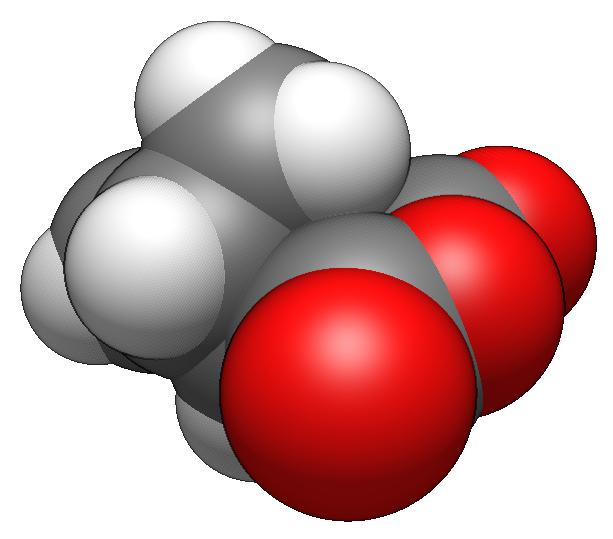
exo

Names
- Systematic IUPAC name 24-oxatricyclo[5.2.1.0^{2,6}]dec-8-ene-3,5-dione
- Other names 5-Norbornene-2,3-dicarboxylic anhydride Nadic acid anhydride Himic anhydride (exo); Carbic anhydride (endo)

Identifiers
CAS Number	826-62-0; 2746-19-2 (exo); 129-64-6 (endo)
3D model (JSmol)	Interactive image
ChemSpider	12668
ECHA InfoCard	100.011.416
EC Number	212-557-9
PubChem CID	13223
UNII	M4UGH0927Z
CompTox Dashboard (EPA)	DTXSID0047456
- InChI: InChI=1S/C9H8O3/c10-8-6-4-1-2-5(3-4)7(6)9(11)12-8/h1-2,4-7H,3H2 Key: KNDQHSIWLOJIGP-UHFFFAOYSA-N; InChI=1S/C9H8O3/c10-8-6-4-1-2-5(3-4)7(6)9(11)12-8/h1-2,4-7H,3H2 Key: KNDQHSIWLOJIGP-UHFFFAOYSA-N
- SMILES: C1C2C=CC1C3C2C(=O)OC3=O

Properties
Chemical formula	C_{9}H_{8}O_{3}
Molar mass	164.160 g·mol^{−1}
Appearance	white solid
- Except where otherwise noted, data are given for materials in their standard state (at 25 °C [77 °F], 100 kPa). Infobox references

Nadic anhydride, also known as 5-norbornene-2,3-dicarboxylic anhydride, is an organic acid anhydride derivative of norbornene.

== Stereochemistry ==
Nadic anhydride exhibits endo-exo isomerism. In the exo isomer, the acid anhydride group points in the same direction towards the bridging carbon of the norbornene, while in the endo isomer the acid anhydride group points in the opposite direction. These isomers are respectively named cis-5-norbornene-exo-2,3-dicarboxylic anhydride (also known as himic anhydride) and cis-5-norbornene-endo-2,3-dicarboxylic anhydride (also known as carbic anhydride). Commercially available nadic anhydride is mainly the endo isomer, as this is the isomer predominantly made in the Diels-Alder reaction in its synthesis.

endo	exo

== Preparation ==
In the patent for the Diels-Alder reaction, nadic anhydride was given as an example of the reaction, made by the addition of maleic anhydride to cyclopentadiene, which gives mostly the endo isomer. The endo isomer can be converted into the exo isomer by irradiation with UV light.

== Uses ==
Due to the reactivity of the norbornene moiety in the thiol-ene reaction, nadic anhydride is used in the synthesis of monomers for cross-linked polymer networks based on thiol-ene linkages.

Nadic anhydride has a known use in the synthesis of moxadolen (LU-253).
