= Alkylidene group =

Organic chemistry functional group

In organic chemistry, alkylidene is a general term for divalent functional groups of the form R_{2}C=, where each R is an alkane or hydrogen. They can be considered the functional group corresponding to mono- or disubstituted divalent carbenes (known as alkylidenes), or as the result of removing two hydrogen atoms from the same carbon atom in an alkane.

The simplest alkylidene group is the methylidene group, H_{2}C=. This is also known by the common name methylene, which can also refer to the methylene bridge group −CH_{2}− or the diradical carbene :CH_{2}.

In organometallic chemistry, divalent ligands are referred to as carbenes, with the term "alkylidene" referring specifically to the narrower class of Schrock carbenes.

== Nomenclature ==
In standard IUPAC nomenclature, alkylidene groups are named by replacing the -yl in the corresponding alkyl group with -ylidene. This practice is also often extended to common names. For example, the isopropyl group (IUPAC: prop-2-yl) −CH(CH_{3})_{2} corresponds to the isopropylidene group =C(CH_{3})_{2} (IUPAC: prop-2-ylidene).

The group is not typically used in common names of branched alkenes - e.g. 3-methylenepentane, the simplest compound that systematically includes an alkylidene group, (Note: Smaller organic compounds that contain a single double bond are strictly alkenes, as the double bond necessarily falls along one of the maximal carbon chains.) is commonly known as 2-ethyl-1-butene. Some authors define the primary chain of an alkene as the one containing the double bond(s), and thus alkylidene groups are only named in branched polyenes. The alkylidene substituent is always named explicitly in cyclic compounds, of which the simplest is methylenecyclopropane.

Conversely, common names of many classes of compounds use alkylidenes in their nomenclature, even though many of them do not formally contain the alkylidene group =CR_{2}, instead containing a substituted methylene bridge −CR_{2}−.

Examples include geminal disubstituted alkanes, such as 1,1-dichloroethane being known as ethylidene dichloride (compare 1,2-dichloroethane's common name of ethylene dichloride); and cyclic ketals such as solketal and Meldrum's acid, also known respectively as isopropylidene glycerol and isopropylidene malonate. The latter two are both examples of acetonides, collectively also known as isopropylidene ketals.

== Compounds ==
Ketenes are compounds of alkylidene and carbonyl. Alkylidene ketenes are, as the name suggests, further composition of alkylidenes and ketenes, containing multiple consecutive C=C bonds.

In organometallic chemistry, double bonded carbons are the defining characteristic of transition metal carbene complexes, where they are typically referred to as carbene ligands. In this context, "alkylidene" refers specifically to Schrock carbenes, in which both the metal and carbon atoms are in the triplet state and form a true double bond (contrast Fischer carbenes, in which the atoms are in the singlet state).

== Reactions ==
The distinction between alkylidenes and alkenes (or alkenyl groups) is semantic in organic chemistry. The compounds are isomeric, defined by the presence of a carbon-carbon double bond, and undergo similar reactions; thus, reactions involving alkylidene groups are typically described using the broader class of alkenes, even those which directly introduce a R_{2}C= substituent (e.g. the Wittig reaction).

Isomerization of alkylidenes yields alkenes and alkenyls, and vice versa, through relocation of the double bond. Isomerization of alkenyl compounds is one route to alkylidene compounds, such as the production of ethylidene norbornene from vinyl norbornene.

In organometallic chemistry, alkylidenes (as Schrock carbenes) possess nucleophilic carbon atoms. They thus form adducts with Lewis acids, and undergo a Wittig-like reaction with carbonyls to yield alkenes (the archetypal example being the alkylidene intermediate yielded by Tebbe's reagent).
