= Dysprosium acetylacetonate =

Names
- IUPAC name Tris(acetylacetonato)dysprosium(III)
- Systematic IUPAC name Tris[(Z)-4-oxopent-2-en-2-olato-κ^{2}O,O′]dysprosium(III)
- Other names Dysprosium(III) 2,4-pentanedionate

Identifiers
CAS Number	14637-88-8
3D model (JSmol)	Interactive image
ChemSpider	14982472
PubChem CID	14455608
- InChI: InChI=1S/3C5H7O2.Dy/c3*1-4(6)3-5(2)7;/h3*3H,1-2H3;/q3*-1;+3 Key: VABPDCUJKLETFM-UHFFFAOYSA-N
- SMILES: CC(=O)[CH-]C(=O)C.CC(=O)[CH-]C(=O)C.CC(=O)[CH-]C(=O)C.[Dy+3]

Properties
Chemical formula	C_{15}H_{21}DyO_{6}
Molar mass	459.827 g·mol^{−1}
Appearance	Yellow powder

Hazards
- GHS labelling
Pictograms	(GHS07: Exclamation mark)
Signal word	Warning
- Except where otherwise noted, data are given for materials in their standard state (at 25 °C [77 °F], 100 kPa). Infobox references

Dysprosium acetylacetonate is a chemical compound of dysprosium with formula Dy(C_{5}H_{7}O_{2})_{3}(H_{2}O)_{n}.

== Preparation and properties ==
Dysprosium acetylacetonate can be prepared by reacting dysprosium or dysprosium hydride with acetylacetone. Dy(acac)_{3}·EtOH·0.5Hacac (where Hacac represents acetylacetone) can be obtained by electrolysis of dysprosium cathode in ethanol solution of acetylacetone, which can be heated to generate Dy(acac)_{3} through Dy(acac)_{3}·EtOH. It is a colorless solid. Its anhydrous form is stable in dry atmosphere and it forms a hydrate in humid air. It can form Dy(acac)_{3}·2CH_{3}OH and Dy(acac)_{3}·CH_{3}OH·CH_{3}CN in a methanol solution of acetonitrile.

== Applications ==
Dysprosium acetylacetonate can be used to catalyze the addition reaction of norbornene and carbon tetrachloride. The dihydrate has been characterized by X-ray crystallography.
