= Molybdenum imido alkylidene complex =

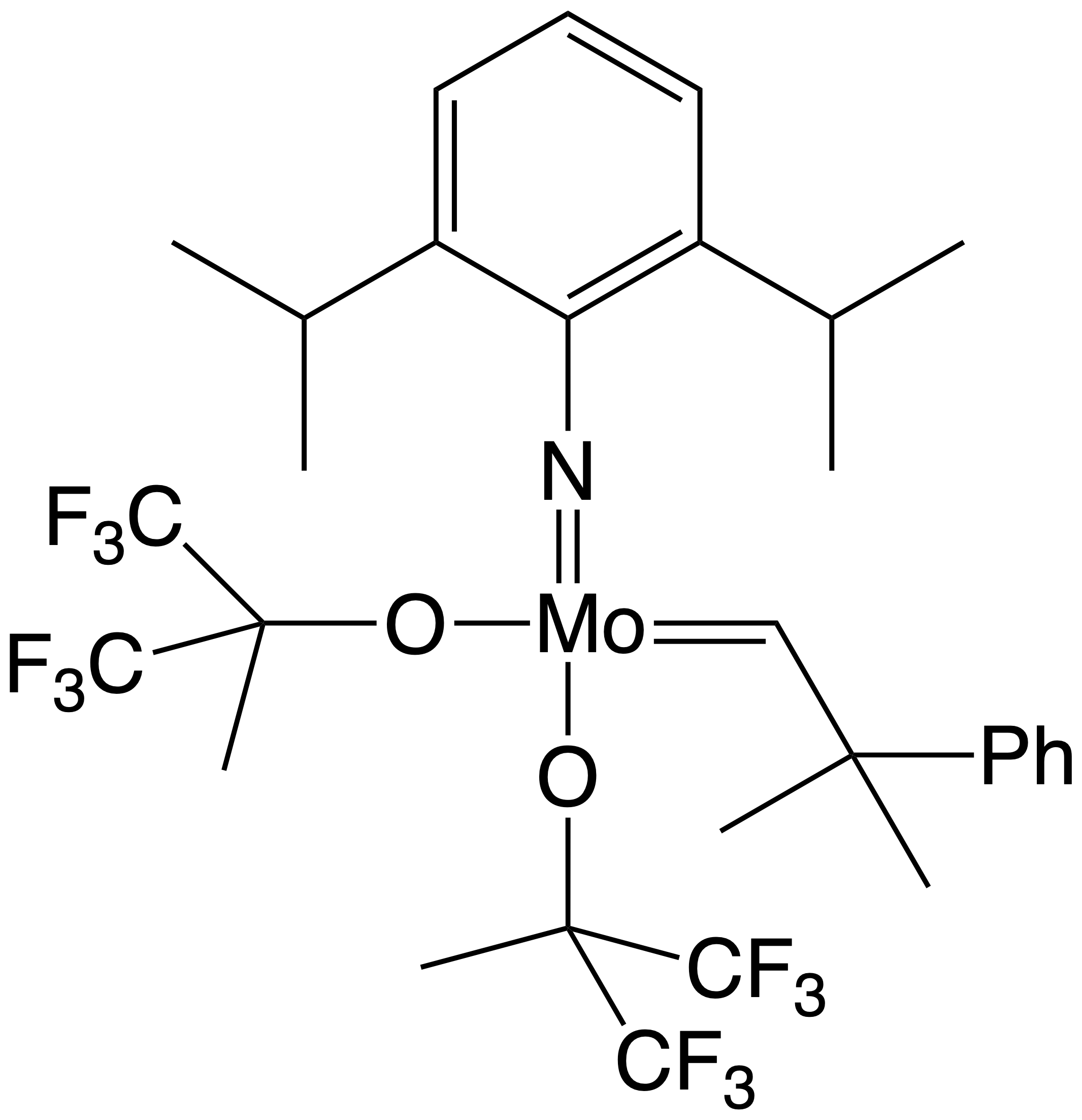

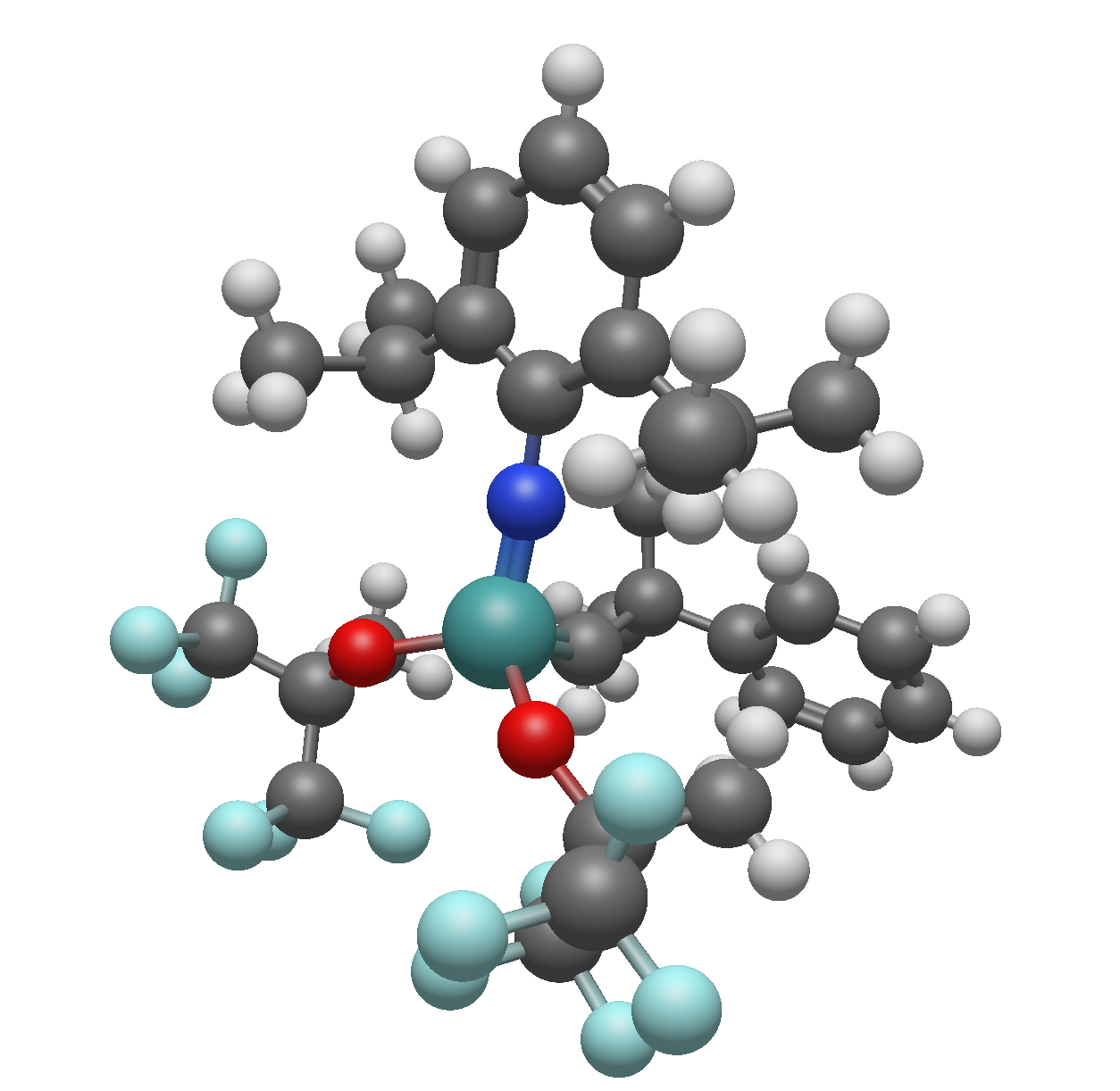

Names
- IUPAC name 2,6-Diisopropylphenylimidoneophylidene molybdenum(VI) bis(hexafluoro-t-butoxide)
- Other names: Mo-bisalkoxide Schrock alkylidene; Schrock catalyst

Identifiers
CAS Number	139220-25-0
3D model (JSmol)	Interactive image
PubChem CID	10996321
- InChI: InChI=1S/C12H17N.C10H12.2C4H4F6O.Mo/c1-8(2)10-6-5-7-11(9(3)4)12(10)13;1-10(2,3)9-7-5-4-6-8-9;2*1-2(11,3(5,6)7)4(8,9)10;/h5-9H,1-4H3;1,4-8H,2-3H3;2*11H,1H3; Key: SKVDWEMQFYIDCB-UHFFFAOYSA-N
- SMILES: CC(C)C1=C(C(=CC=C1)C(C)C)N=[Mo]=CC(C)(C)C2=CC=CC=C2.CC(C(F)(F)F)(C(F)(F)F)O.CC(C(F)(F)F)(C(F)(F)F)O

Properties
Chemical formula	C_{30}H_{35}F_{12}MoNO_{2}
Molar mass	765.55 g·mol^{−1}
- Except where otherwise noted, data are given for materials in their standard state (at 25 °C [77 °F], 100 kPa). Infobox references

Molybdenum imido alkylidene complexes are among the most successful and representative types of Schrock catalysts. They are pivotal organometallic compounds consisting of a molybdenum center bonded to both an imido and an alkylidene ligand. These complexes have garnered significant attention due to their role as catalysts in olefin metathesis reactions, which involves the redistribution of carbon-carbon double bonds in alkenes. Richard R. Schrock was awarded the Nobel Prize in Chemistry of 2005 along with Yves Chauvin and Robert H.Grubbs for their contributions to the field of olefin metathesis.

== Structure ==
Molybdenum(VI) imido alkylidenes have 14 valence electrons and d^{0} metal centers. The complexes are generally characterized by their high oxidation state, imido ligands, and bulky alkoxide ligands.

The Mo(VI) electron-deficient metal centers are electron-poor and electrophilic with vacant orbitals that strongly attract and bind olefin substrates via π-coordination, thus facilitating olefin coordination when catalyzing olefin metathesis. The imido ligands (M=NR, [NR]^{2-}) are dianionic and can be sterically protected by a large R group to avoid bimolecular decomposition reactions. They have moderate π-donation capability and are weaker electron donors compared to traditional carbenes, thus contributing to higher electrophilicity of the metal center. Finally, the bulky alkoxide ligands can also sterically hinder unwanted bimolecular decomposition pathways involving the intermediate [Mo(NAr)(CHR′)(OR)_{2}] species and stabilize reactive intermediates during catalysis; a highly electron-withdrawing group like OCMe(CF_{3})_{2} further contributes to the electrophilicity of the metal center and increasing its affinity for metathesis reactions.

Additionally, Mo(VI) imido alkylidene complexes can be categorized as Schrock carbenes, which have considerable π-backbonding and thus support a strong Mo=C double bond that is nucleophilic. The electron-withdrawing alkoxide ligands also enhances this metal-carbon double bond, contributing to the metal-center being oxyphilic. The carbene is thus polarized with Mo having partial positive and C having partial negative charge, ^{δ+}Mo=C^{δ-}.

Molybdenum imido alkylidene complexes exhibit a slightly distorted tetrahedral geometry around the metal center, with d orbital splitting resembling a tetrahedral transition metal complex as described by Crystal Field Theory. As the molybdenum(VI) center is highly oxidized and without any valence electrons in d orbitals, its LUMO is the lowest-energy d-orbital d_{z2}. d_{z2} is stabilized by σ-donation from the nitrogen lone pair (with sp-hybridized orbital) of the imido ligand as well as the sp^{2}-hybridized orbital from the carbon of the alkylidene ligand. The d_{xy}, d_{yz}, d_{xz} orbitals receive π-donation from the π-systems of the respective imido and alkylidene ligands to become more stabilized. Furthermore, the metal center donates electron density to the α-carbon of the alkylidene to allow for π-backbonding; The polarization of electron density in bonding orbitals towards the α-carbon (and the opposite for the corresponding anti-bonding orbitals) indicates the polarized bond between the ligand and the metal center. In addition, the entirely vacant d orbitals of the complex strongly encourage the binding of olefins to form metallacyclobutane during catalysis, further validating the potential for highly efficient and reactive catalysis during olefin metathesis.

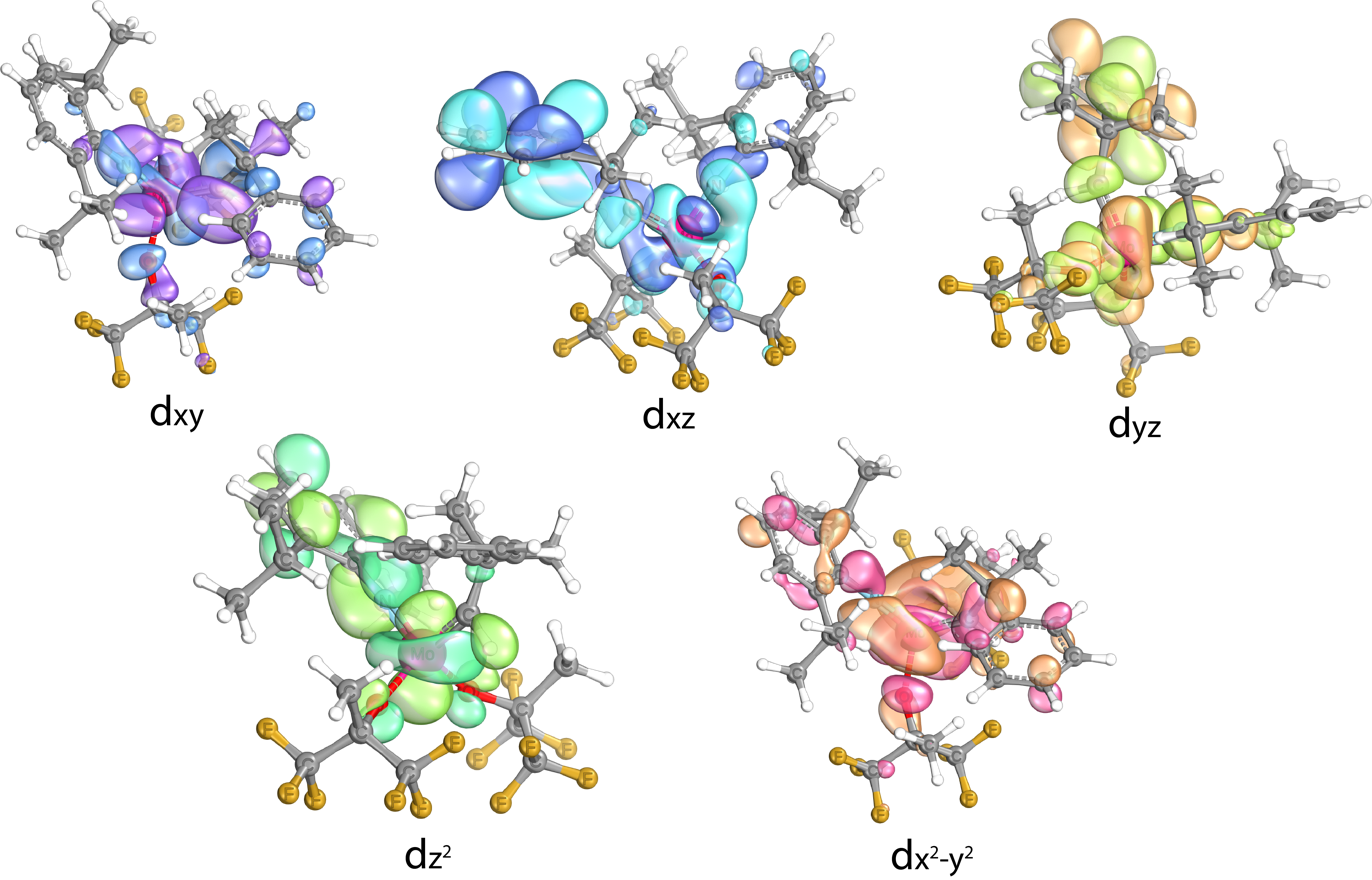
Intrinsic Bond Orbital (IBO) views of the d orbital of a Mo-bisalkoxide Schrock alkylidene, calculated with B3LYP method and def2-SVP basis set with ORCA

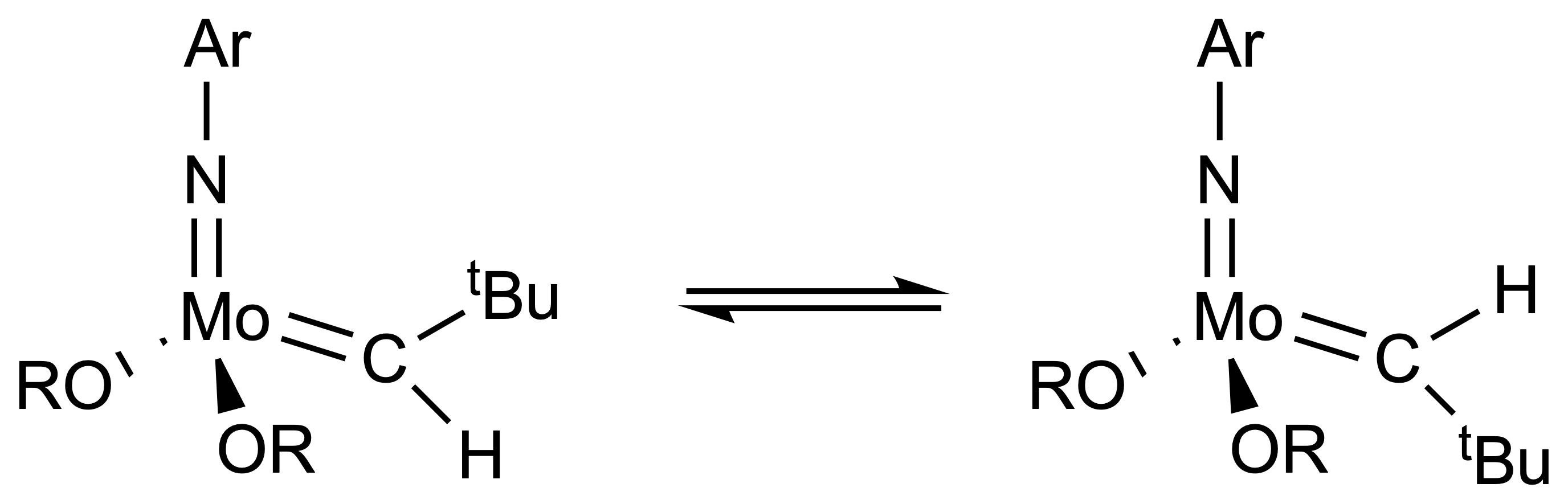
The general structure (syn on the left, anti on the right) of a Mo(VI) imido alkylidene complex (Schrock catalyst) with its rotamer

Two distinct rotamers—syn and anti—exist due to the orientation of the alkylidene ligand relative to the imido ligand plane and the limited number of accessible π orbitals that the highly oxidized metal center can use to form more than one metal-alkylidene π bond, especially when a strong π-bonding ligands like the imido ligand is present. These rotamers exhibit dramatically different reactivities as a result of variations in orbital overlap and steric interactions. The syn form typically shows stronger CH α-agostic interactions (interaction between metal center and adjacent C–H bonds), stabilizing reactive intermediates and influencing catalytic performance.

== History ==
=== Pioneering work in transition metal carbenes ===
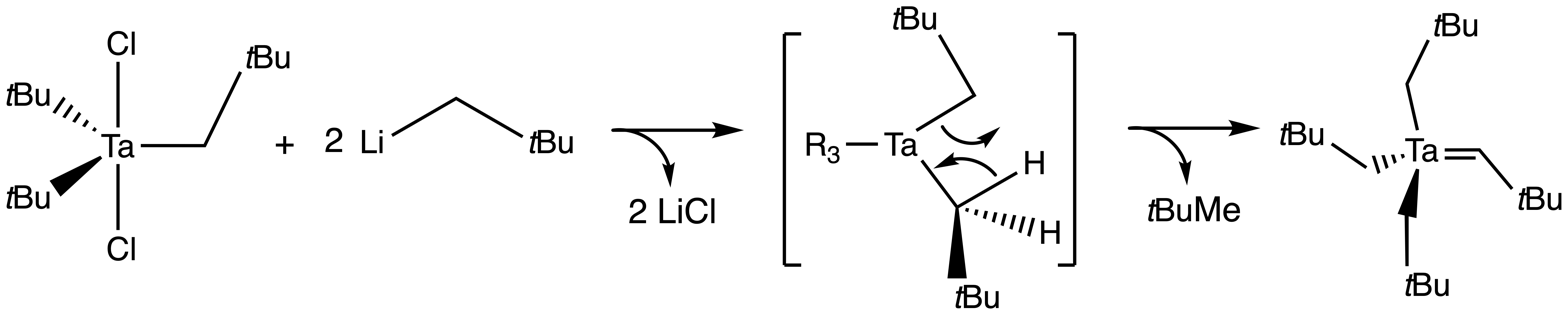
Formation of the first alkylidene complex [Ta(CH_{2}CMe_{3})_{3}(=CHCMe_{3})] with a high oxidation state by a-hydrogen abstraction

In the early 1970s, Schrock, then at DuPont, attempted to synthesize tantalum(V) complexes such as [Ta(CH_{2}CMe_{3})_{5}]. Instead, he isolated the first stable metal-alkylidene complex, [Ta(CH_{2}CMe_{3})_{3}(=CHCMe_{3})], characterized by a tantalum-carbon double bond. This accidental discovery marked the birth of well-defined metal-alkylidene chemistry. Unlike Fischer carbenes that were characterized previously, which relied on π-backbonding from low-valent metals, Schrock’s high-valent tantalum alkylidenes exhibited σ-bonding character, making them more reactive toward olefins. However, these early tantalum complexes failed to catalyze olefin metathesis.

Later, Schrock recognized that alkoxide ligands could modulate the electrophilicity of the metal center. By 1980, his group at MIT reported a tantalum-alkylidene complex, [Ta(=CHC(CH_{3})_{3})Cl(PMe_{3})(OC(CH_{3})_{3})_{2}], which successfully catalyzed the metathesis of cis-2-pentene. The alkoxide ligands stabilized the electrophilic metal center while allowing substrate binding—a critical design principle for future catalysts.

=== The shift to group 6 metals ===
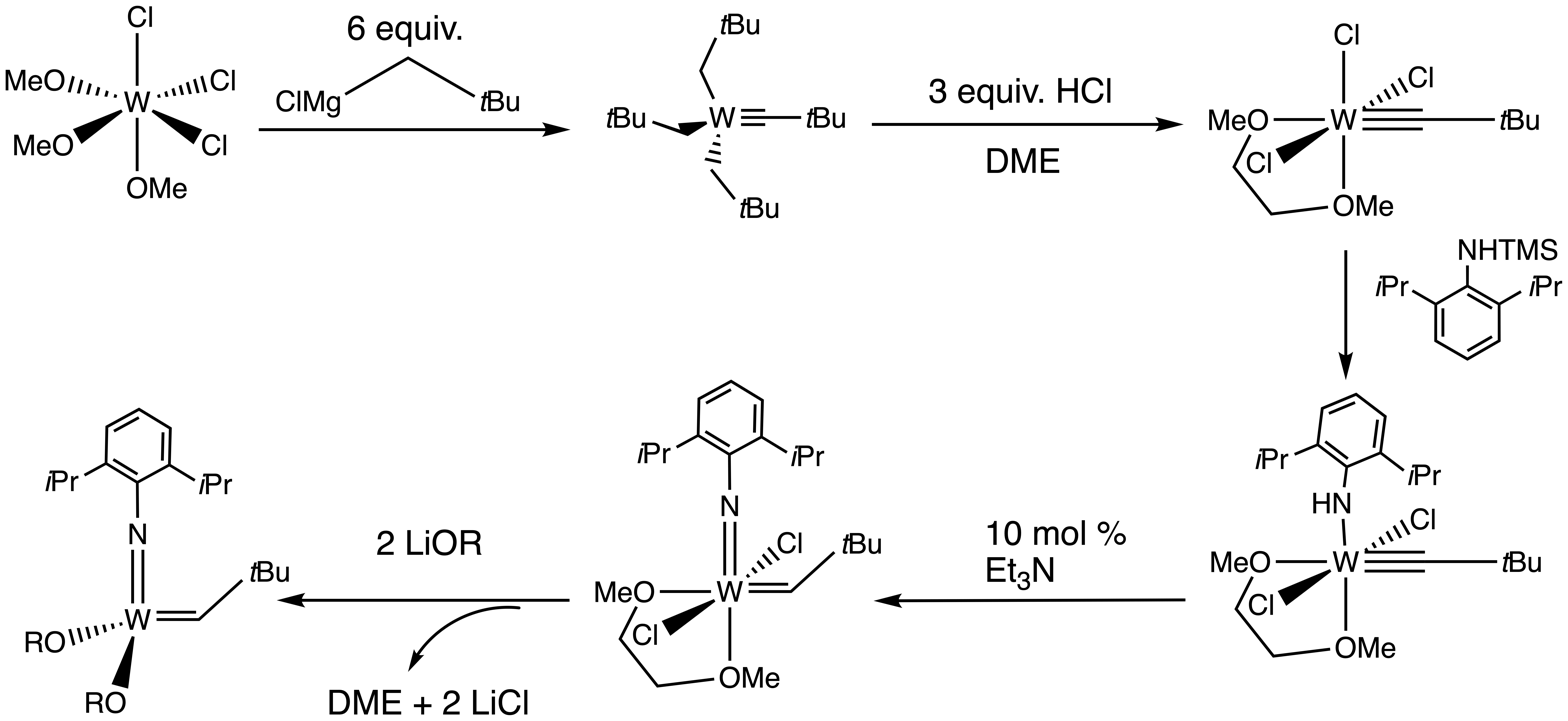
Synthesis of tungsten imido alkylidene complexes from alkylidyne

By the mid-1980s, Schrock turned to molybdenum and tungsten, recognizing their superior activity in traditional metathesis systems. But as bonds between molybdenum and ligands are generally weaker than those between tungsten and ligands, Schrock theorized that a molybdacyclobutane complex might lose an olefin more readily than a tungsten one. In 1986, his group synthesized the first well-defined molybdenum imido alkylidene complexes of the general formula [Mo(=CHR)(=N-Ar)(OR')_{2}], where Ar is an aryl group and R' is a bulky alkoxide (e.g., OCMe(CF_{3})_{2}). These 14-electron, d⁰ complexes exhibited remarkable activity, enabling living ring-opening metathesis polymerization (ROMP) of strained olefins like norbornene.

=== Subsequent commercialization ===
In the 1990s, molybdenum imido alkylidene complexes as Schrock catalysts was commercialized, especially the complex [Mo(N-2,6-iPr_{2}C_{6}H_{3})(CHCMe_{2}Ph)(OCMe(CF_{3})_{2})_{2}], which became a cornerstone for asymmetric metathesis. These catalysts outperformed contemporary systems in stereoselective reactions, enabling the synthesis of complex molecules like epothilones and prostaglandins. Their applications spanned many curical chemical processes, including the ROMP of norbornene derivatives yielding polymers with controlled molecular weights and narrow dispersities in polymer chemistry, ring-closing metathesis facilitating macrocyclization in alkaloids and polyketides in natural product synthesis, and the Shell Higher Olefin Process (SHOP) α-olefin production in indusctrial process.

== Synthesis ==
Schrock and his group first attempted to synthesize Mo(CH-t-Bu)(NAr)Cl_{2}(dme), the first Mo imido alkylidene complex devised, through reactions of a precursor Mo(C-t-Bu)(CH_{2}-t-Bu)_{3} that was theorized to be analogous of the known W(C-t-Bu)(CH_{2}-t-Bu)_{3}. However, Mo(C-t-Bu)(CH_{2}-t-Bu)_{3} turned out to be difficult to prepare, had only ~35% yield at most, and its reactions cannot be scaled up without decreasing in yield further.

The eventual successful synthesis of Mo(CH-t-Bu)(NAr)Cl_{2}(dme) used Mo(NAr)_{2}Cl_{2} as the starting material that gives rise to the desired imido alkylidene complex, using an imido ligand as a protecting group. Mo(NAr)_{2}Cl_{2} itself can be prepared from the commercially available MoO_{2}Cl_{2}:

MoO_{2}Cl_{2}(thf)_{2} + 2 ArNH(SiMe_{3}) + 2 2,^{−}_{6}lutidine + 4 Me_{3}SiCl → Mo(NAr)_{2}Cl_{2}(dme) + 2,^{−}_{6}lutidine • HCl

The resultant Mo(NAr)_{2}CI_{2}(DME) was found to react readily with the neophyl chloride Grignard reagent RCH_{2}MgCl, with R being t-Bu or PhMe_{2}C{Mo(NAr)2Cl2(dme)} + 2RCH2MgCl ->[dme] Mo(NAr)2(CH_{2}R)2.

Then, the crystalline Mo(NAr)_{2}(CH_{2}R)_{2} complexes undergo reaction with triflic acid, leading to multiple protonation and subsequent elimination of one of its imido ligands and the formation of the schrock catalyst precursor, the Mo imido alkylidene complex Mo(CHR)(NAr)(OTf)_{2}(dme), or specifically Mo(CH-t-Bu)(NAr)(OTf)_{2}(dme).

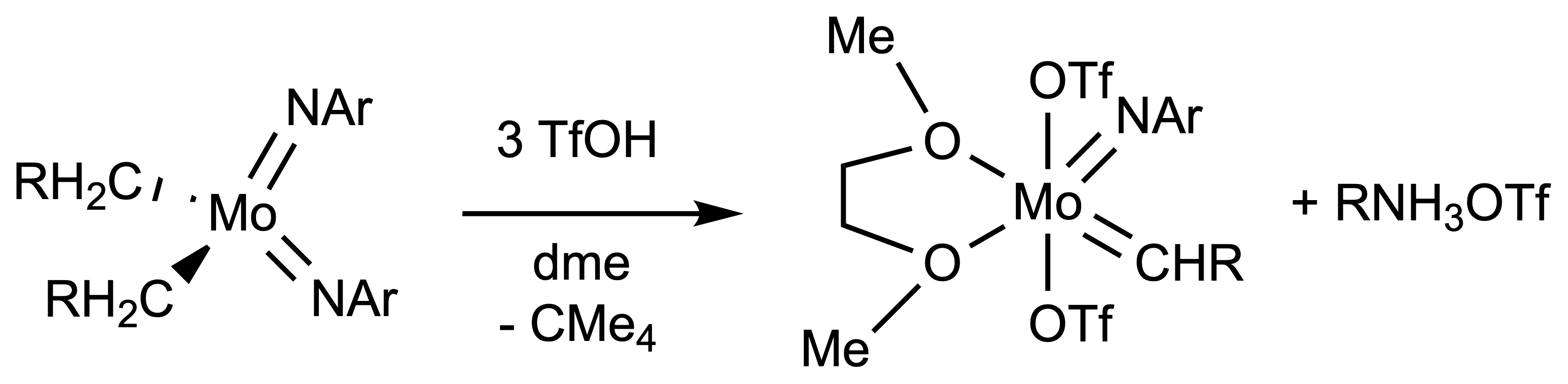
The reaction of Mo(NAr)_{2}(CH_{2}R)_{2} complex with triflic acid to form Schrock catalyst precursor

To arrive at the generic form Mo(CH-t-Bu)(NAr)(OR)_{2} of Schrock's catalyst, one final reaction of Mo(CH-t-Bu)(NAr)(OTf)_{2}(dme) with 2 equiv of LiOR (OR could now be OCMe(CF_{3})_{2}, OCMe_{2}(CF_{3}), O-t-Bu) in ether at -30 °C:

Mo(CHtBu)(NAr)(OTf)_{2}(dme) + 2LiOR → Mo(CHtBu)(NAr)(OR)_{2} in ether, at -30C

The resultant complex Mo(CH-t-Bu)(NAr)(OR)_{2} is yellow-orange, crystalline extremely soluble in pentane with yield of around 75%.

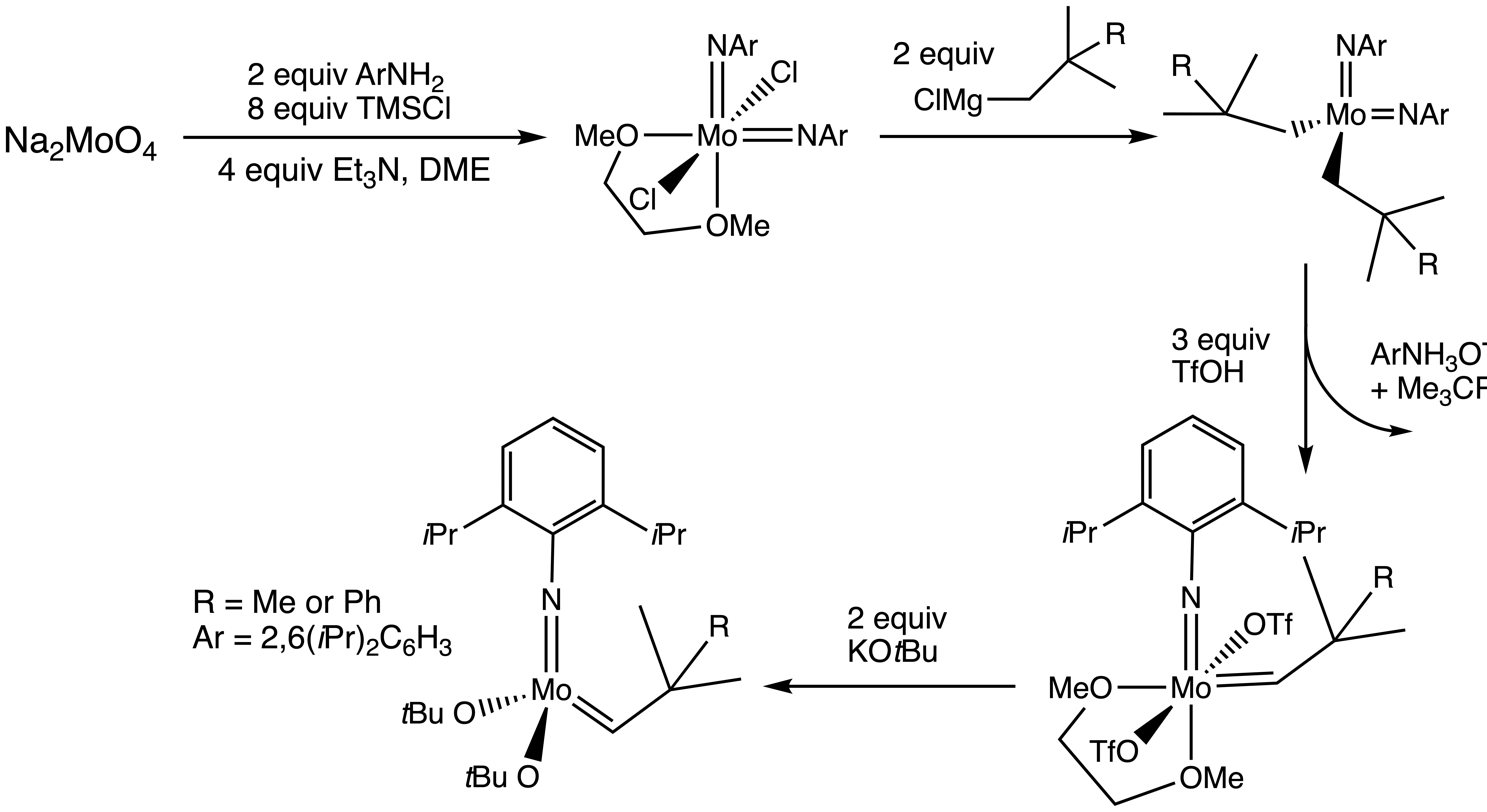
Synthesis scheme of molybdenum-based alkylidene complexes

== Reaction mechanism ==
The mechanism of olefin metathesis catalyzed by molybdenum imido alkylidene complexes is accurately described by the Chauvin mechanism, which involves a catalytic cycle centered around the formation and decomposition of a four-membered metallacyclobutane intermediate.

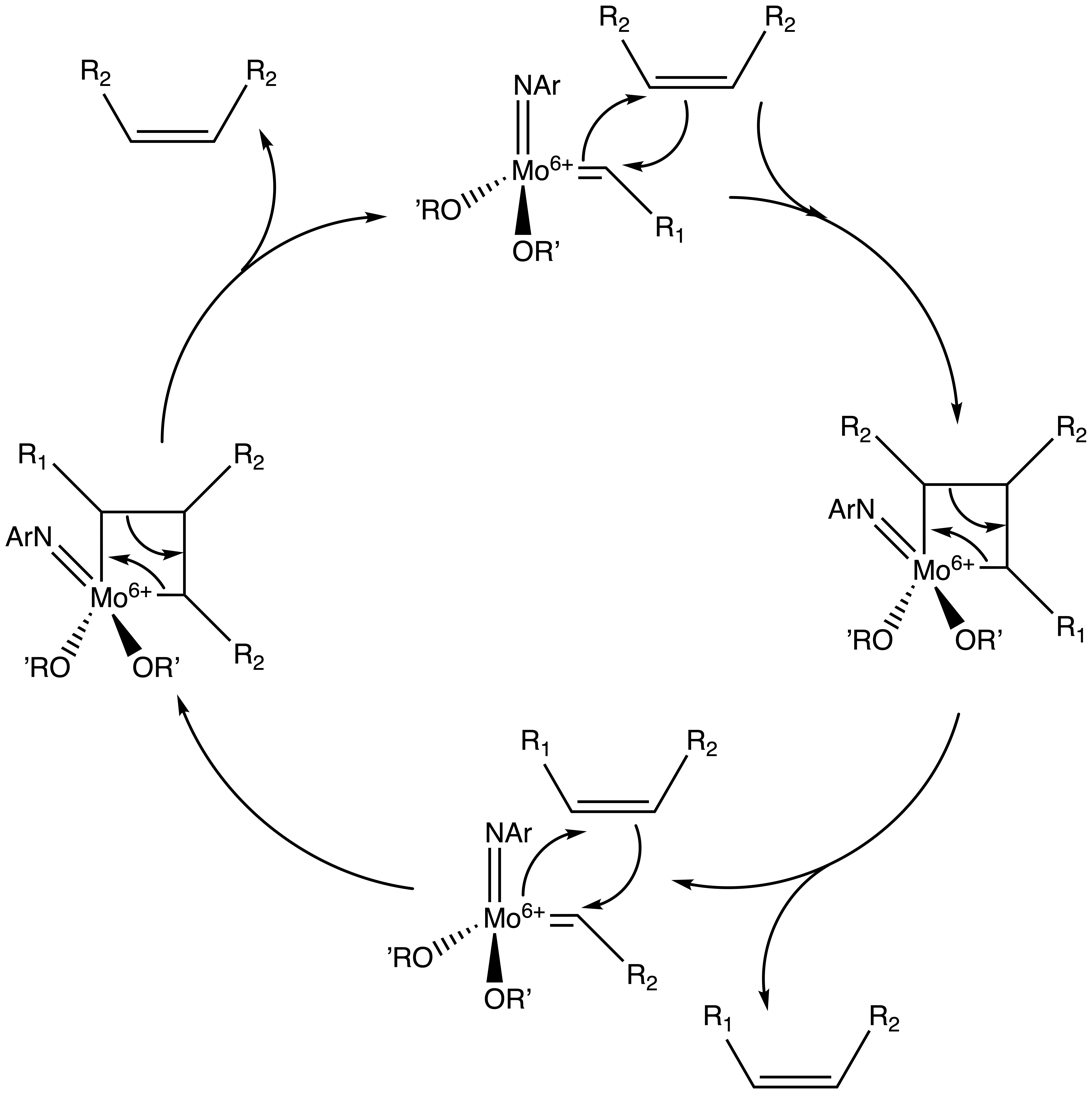
The Chauvin mechanism of olefin metathesis, catalyzed by molybdenum imido alkylidene complex

The catalytic cycle can be divided into the following stages:

1. Coordination of an incoming reactant alkene to the electrophilic metal center. Due to the electron-deficient character of Mo(VI), the olefin π-bond donates electron density into vacant d-orbitals on molybdenum, forming a loosely bound π-complex intermediate
2. The coordinated olefin undergoes a [2+2] cycloaddition with the metal alkylidene double bond. This step creates a four-membered metallacyclobutane ring intermediate, consisting of three carbon atoms and one molybdenum atom connected by single bonds. This metallacyclobutane intermediate is a key species in the Chauvin mechanism and has been experimentally observed and characterized in various studies.
3. The metallacyclobutane intermediate then undergoes a reverse reaction of cycloaddition. In this step, two single bonds within the metallacyclobutane ring break simultaneously. One bond cleavage releases a new olefin molecule, and the other bond cleavage regenerates a new metal alkylidene species. This newly formed metal alkylidene now contains an alkylidene fragment derived from the original olefin substrate, and olefin metathesis is complete.

The Chauvin mechanism clearly explains experimental observations such as isotope labeling experiments, product distributions, and stereochemical outcomes. Metallacyclobutane intermediates have been experimentally isolated or spectroscopically observed, strongly supporting this mechanism. And computational studies confirm low-energy pathways for cycloaddition and cycloreversion steps facilitated by orbital interactions between metal centers and coordinated olefins.

== Catalytic applications ==
Molybdenum imido alkylidene complexes are highly versatile tools in organic synthesis and industrial chemistry due to their exceptional reactivity and selectivity in olefin metathesis, which in itself includes a broad spectrum of reactions.

=== Cross metathesis ===
Molybdenum imido alkylidene complexes catalyzes the exchange of alkylidene groups between different olefins, providing a versatile method for carbon-carbon bond formation. This reaction enables modification of functionalized olefins for pharmaceutical intermediates and helps prepare α-olefins for industrial applications.

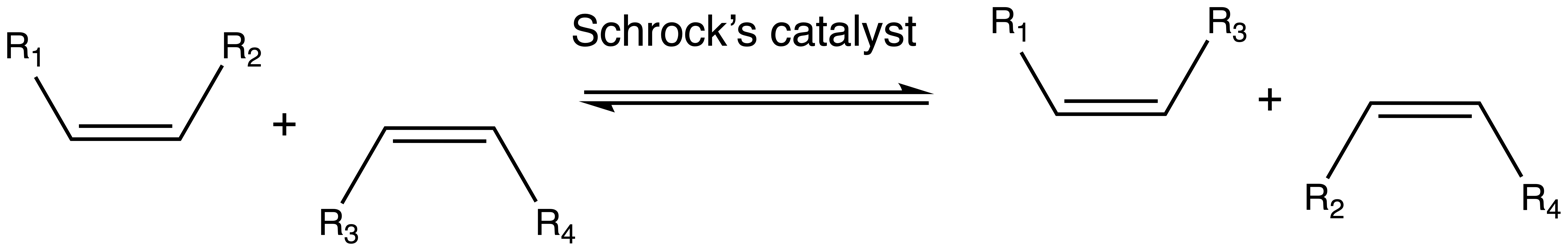
Cross Metathesis reaction catalyzed by Schrock's catalyst

=== Ring-closing metathesis ===
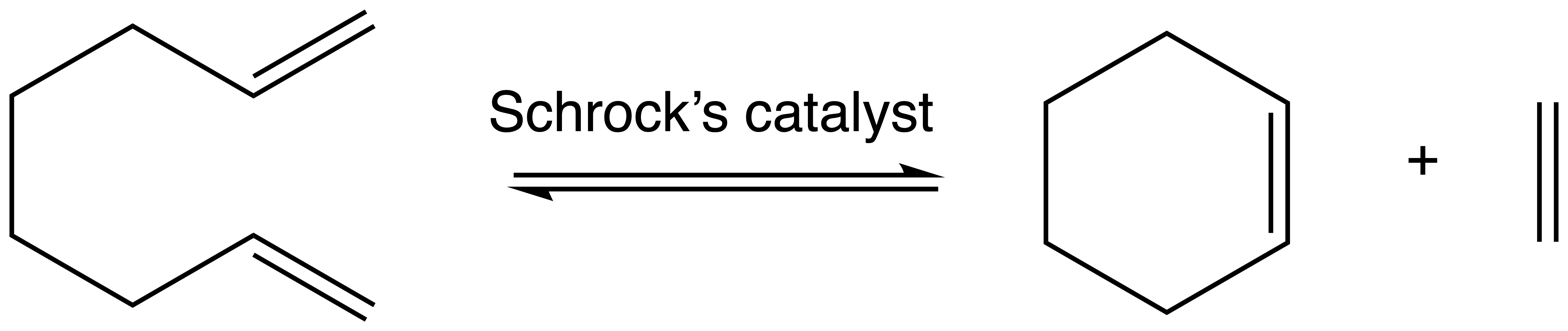
Model for ring-closing metathesis catalyzed by Schrock's catalyst

Similarly, Schrock catalysts are extensively used for ring-closing metathesis, a reaction that forms cyclic olefins from acyclic diene precursors. This application is particularly valuable in the synthesis of macrocycles, where molybdenum imido alkylidene compounds enable the efficient formation of large-ring compounds, such as cyclic peptides and macrolides, which are challenging to synthesize using traditional methods. Additionally, complex natural products like alkaloids, polyketides, and terpenes often require macrocyclization steps facilitated by RCM. For example, Schrock catalysts have been used in the comparative synthesis of biologically active compounds such as insect pheromones and antibiotics, including the anti-cancer agent epothilone C and the marine sponge alkaloid nakadomarin.

=== Ring-opening metathesis polymerization ===
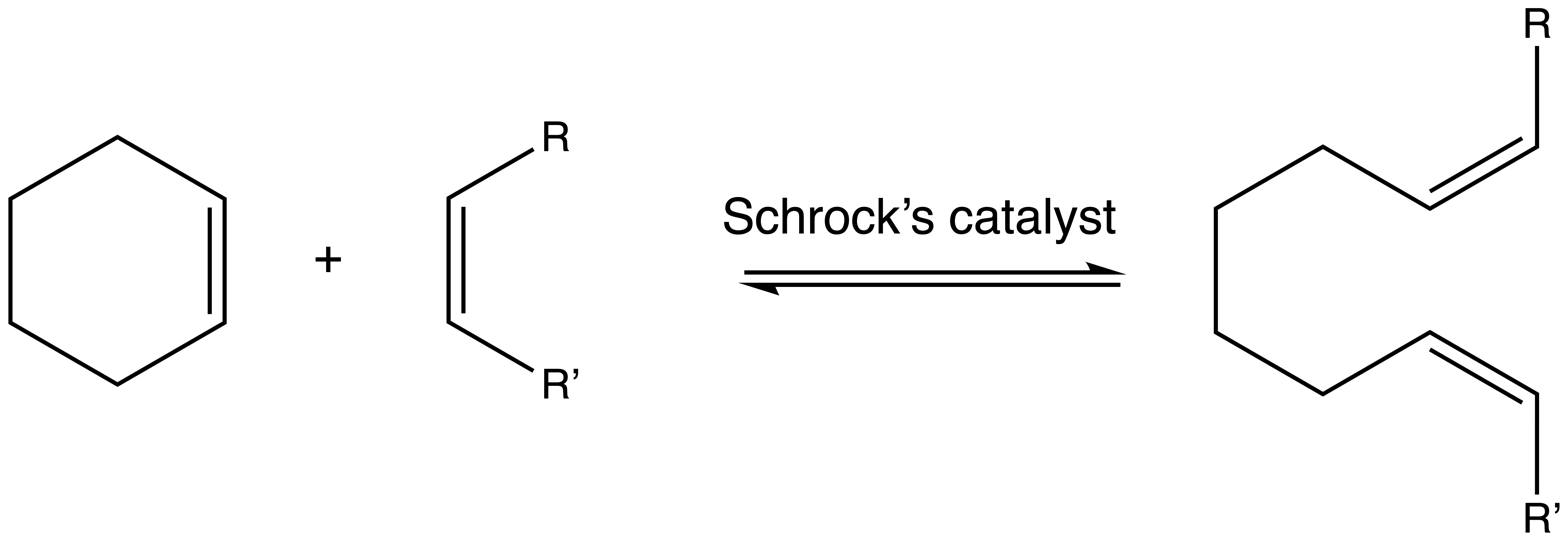
Model for ring-opening metathesis polymerization catalyzed by Schrock's catalyst

Schrock catalysts are also widely used in ROMP to polymerize strained cyclic olefins like norbornene and cyclooctene. This reaction method produces polymers with controlled molecular weights, narrow dispersities, and tunable properties for applications in materials science.

Furthermore, the complexes also play a role in synthesizing functionalized polymers. The ability of Schrock catalysts to tolerate a wide range functional groups allows the synthesis of polymers with hydroxyl, carboxyl, aldehyde, ether, or amine functionalities. These polymers are in turn applied widely in coatings, adhesives, and biomedical devices.

== Further modifications and advancements ==
=== Asymmetric metathesis ===
The first asymmetric Schrock catalyst, using a BINOL ligand

The first asymmetric molybdenum catalyst for enantioselective olefin metathesis reactions was developed in 1993 by McConville et al with Schrock's group by modifying the complex with a BINOL ligand. These catalysts are used to synthesize compounds with high enantiomeric purity, such as chiral heterocycles and pharmaceuticals, enabling enantioselective transformations in drug discovery.

=== Air-stable precatalysts ===
The development of air-stable precatalysts for Schrock catalysts, such as bipyridine adducts, is another a significant advancement in addressing the inherent air sensitivity of molybdenum imido alkylidene complexes given their high reactivity. These precatalysts can stabilize the reactive 14-electron molybdenum alkylidene species by forming 18-electron adducts with Lewis bases like bipyridine or phenanthroline. This protective Lewis base is removed from the coordination sphere by treating the adduct with a Lewis acid such as ZnCl_{2}·dioxane to liberate the active molybdenum alkylidene complex and carry out olefin metathesis accordingly.

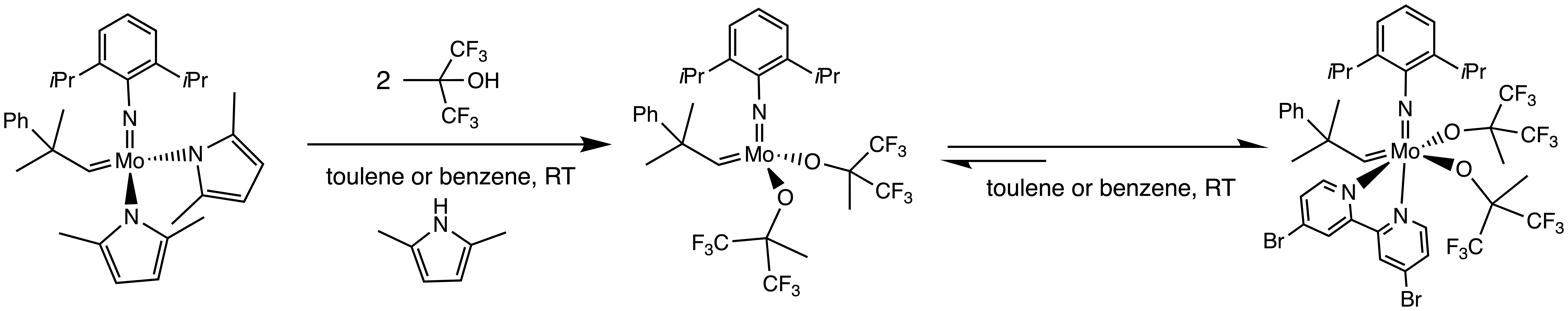
Isolation of the labile, air-stable 18-electron adducts in equilibrium with 14-electron molybdenum imido alkylidene complex
