= Endo–exo isomerism =

Stereoisomerism found in bridged-ring compounds

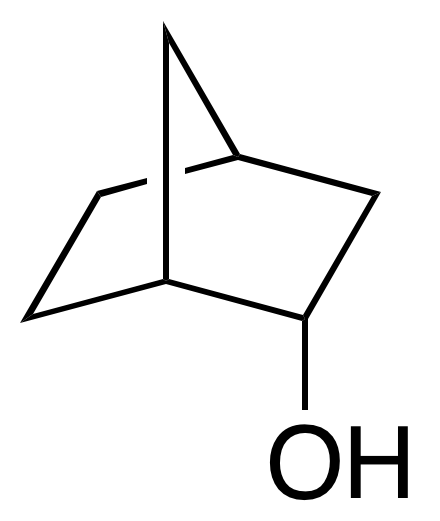
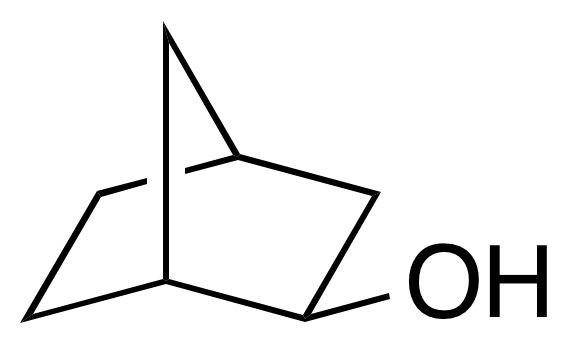
Comparison of endo-norborneol (left) and exo-norborneol (right)

In organic chemistry, endo–exo isomerism is a special type of stereoisomerism found in organic compounds with a substituent on a bridged ring system. The prefix endo is reserved for the isomer with the substituent located closest, or "syn", to the longest bridge. The prefix exo is reserved for the isomer with the substituent located furthest, or "anti", to the longest bridge. Here "longest" and "shortest" refer to the number of atoms that comprise the bridge. This type of molecular geometry is found in norbornane systems such as dicyclopentadiene.

The terms endo and exo are used in a similar sense in discussions of the stereoselectivity in Diels–Alder reactions.
