= EPDM rubber =

Type of synthetic rubber

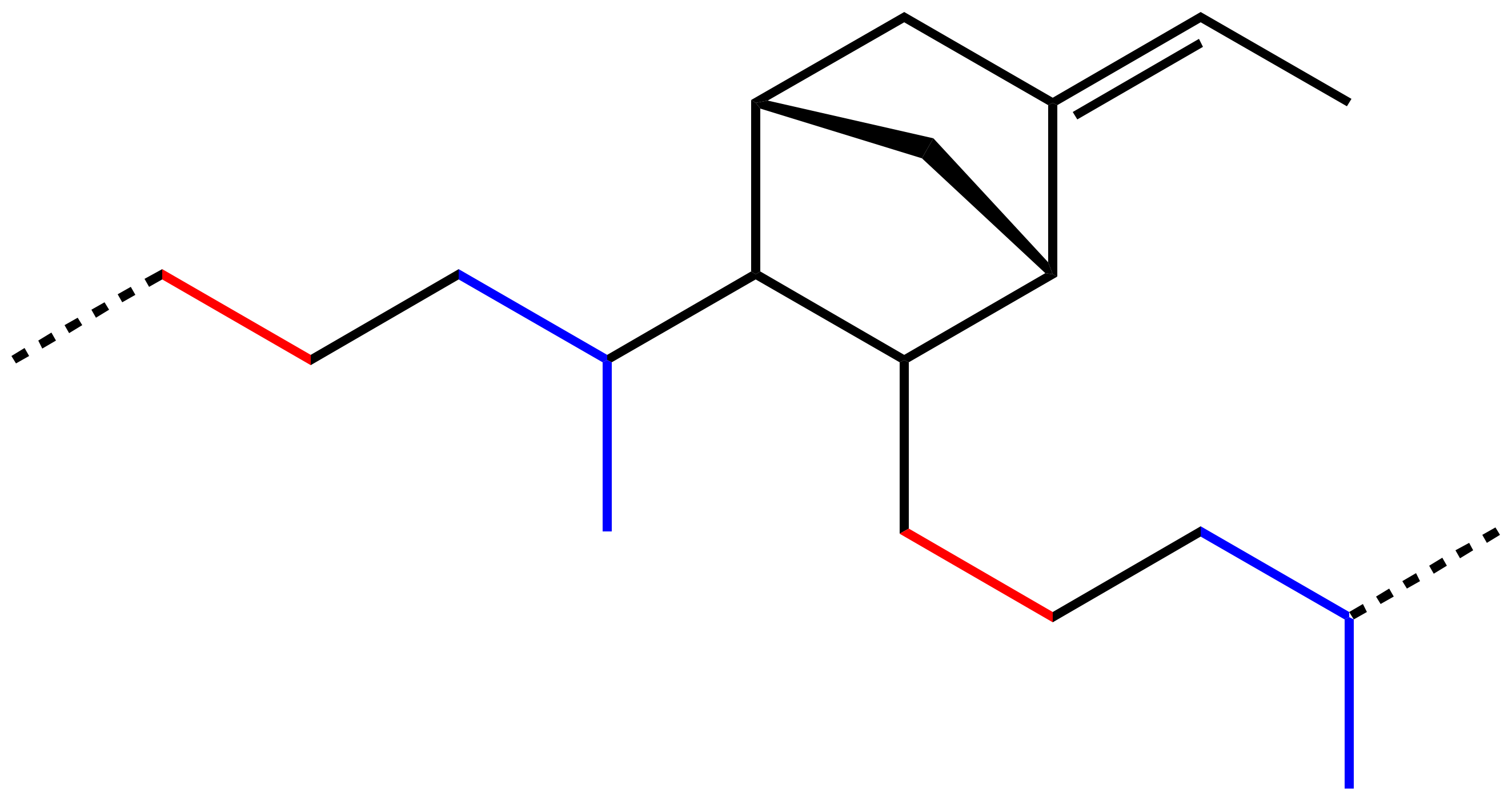
Idealized EPDM polymer, red = ethylene-derived; blue = propylene-derived; black = ethylidene norbornene-derived

EPDM rubber (ethylene propylene diene monomer rubber, sometimes called EDPM rubber) is a type of synthetic rubber that is used in many applications.

EPDM is an M-Class rubber under ASTM standard D-1418; the M class comprises elastomers with a saturated polyethylene chain (the M deriving from the more correct term polymethylene). EPDM is made from ethylene, propylene, and a diene comonomer that enables crosslinking via sulfur vulcanization. Typically used dienes in the manufacture of EPDM rubbers are ethylidene norbornene (ENB), dicyclopentadiene (DCPD), and vinyl norbornene (VNB). Varying diene contents are reported in commercial products, which are generally in the range from 2 to 12%.

The earlier relative of EPDM is EPR, ethylene propylene rubber (useful for high-voltage electrical cables), which is not derived from any diene precursors and can be crosslinked only using radical methods such as peroxides.

As with most rubbers, EPDM as used is always compounded with fillers such as carbon black and calcium carbonate, with plasticisers such as paraffinic oils, and has functional rubbery properties only when crosslinked. Crosslinking mainly occurs via vulcanisation with sulfur but is also accomplished with peroxides (for better heat resistance) or phenolic resins. High-energy radiation, such as from electron beams, is sometimes used to produce foams, wire, and cable.

== Properties ==
Typical properties of EPDM vulcanizates are given below. EPDM can be compounded to meet specific properties to a limit, depending first on the EPDM polymers available, then the processing and curing method(s) employed. EPDMs are available in various molecular weights (indicated in Mooney viscosity ML(1+4) at 125 °C), varying levels of ethylene, third monomer, and oil content.

Because of chemical interactions, EPDM degrades when in contact with bituminous material such as EPDM gaskets on asphalt shingles.

Mechanical properties of EPDM
Property	Value
Appearance	Non-transparent black color
Hardness, Shore A	30–90
Tensile failure stress, ultimate	17 MPa (500-2500 PSI)
Elongation after fracture in %	≥ 300%
Density	Can be compounded from 0.90 to >2.0 g/cm^{3}

Thermal properties of EPDM
Property	Value
Coefficient of thermal expansion, linear	160 μm/(m·K)
Maximum service temperature	150 °C
Minimum service temperature	−50 °C
Glass transition temperature	−54 °C

== Uses ==
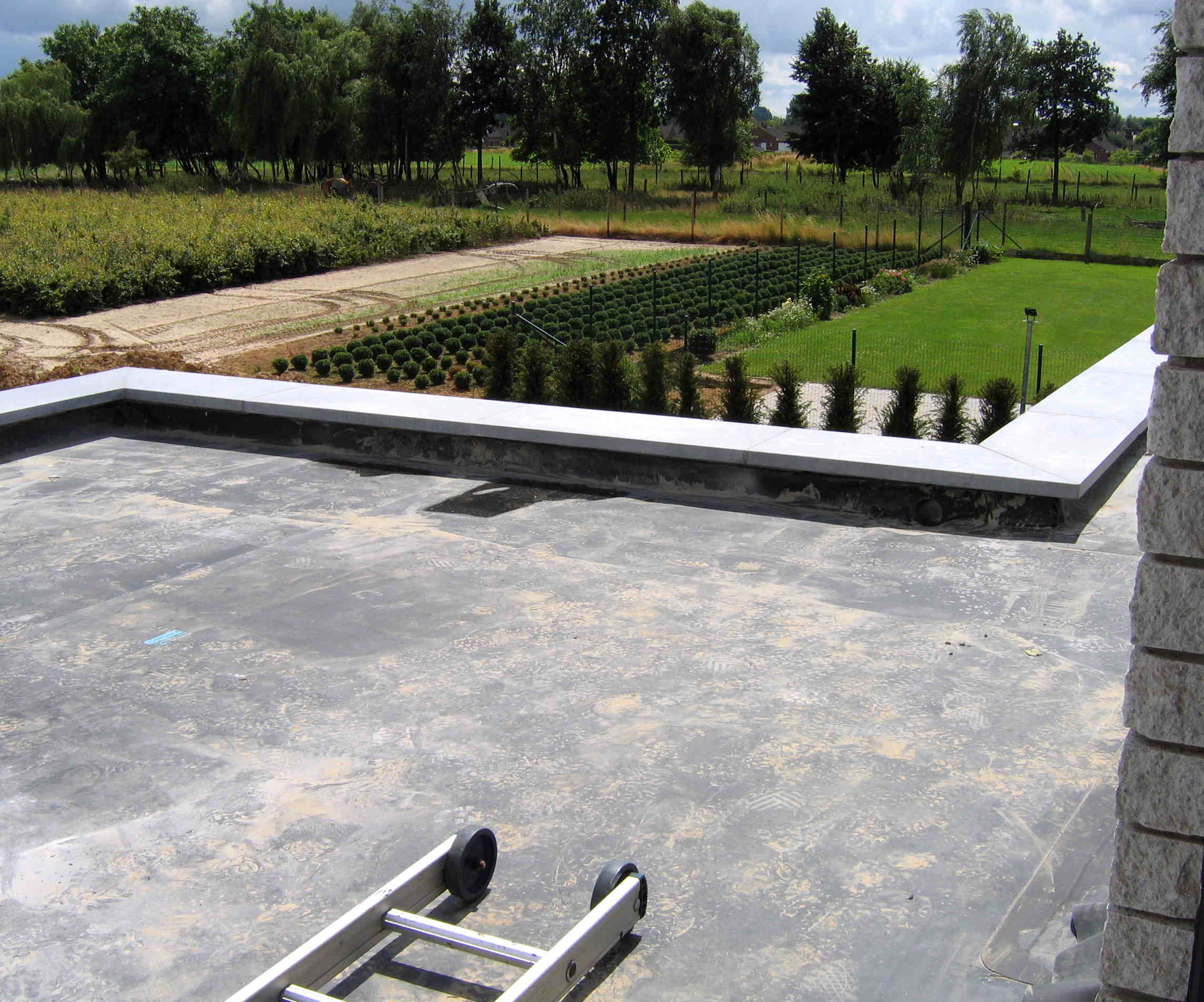
An EPDM rubber roof

Relative to rubbers with unsaturated backbones (natural rubber, SBR, neoprene), rubbers with saturated polymer backbones, such as EPDM, exhibit superior resistance to heat, light, and ozone exposure. For this reason they are useful in external harsh environments. EPDM in particular exhibits outstanding resistance to heat, ozone, steam, and weather. As such, EPDM can be formulated to be resistant to temperatures as high as 150 °C, and, properly formulated, can be used outdoors for many years or decades without degradation. EPDM has good low-temperature properties, with elastic properties to temperatures as low as −40 °C depending on the grade and the formulation.

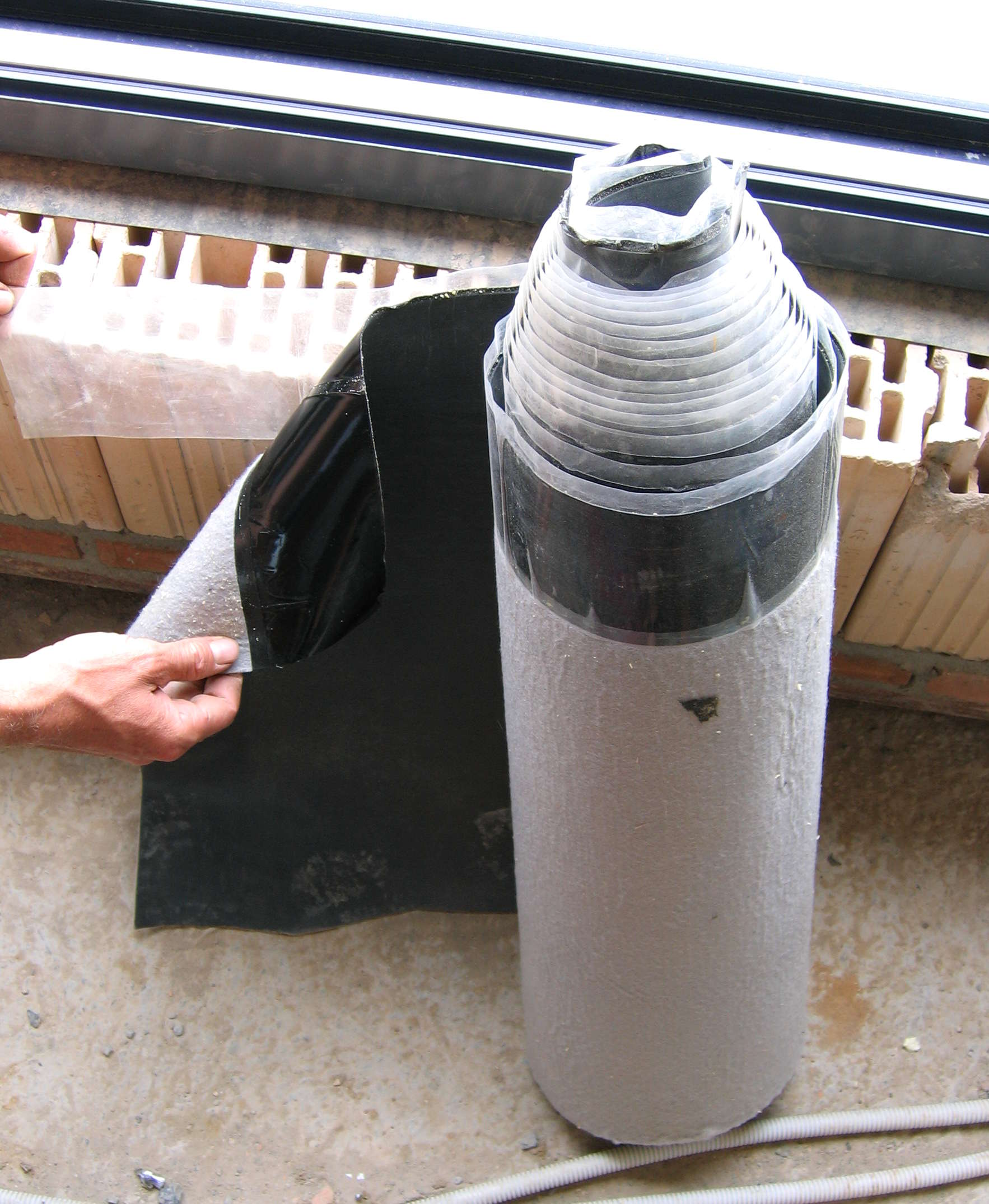
A roll of EPDM flashing with fleece on the back, used for waterproofing roofs

EPDM is stable towards fireproof hydraulic fluids, ketones, hot and cold water, and alkalis.

As a durable elastomer, EPDM is conformable, impermeable, and a good electrical insulator. Solid EPDM and expanded EPDM foam are often used for sealing and gasketing, as well as membranes and diaphragms. EPDM is often used when a component must prevent fluid flow while remaining flexible. It can also be used to provide cushioning or elasticity. While EPDM has decent tensile strength, its flexibility makes it inappropriate for rigid parts such as gears, shafts, and structural beams.

It is used to create weatherstripping, seals on doors for refrigerators and freezers (where it also acts as an insulator), face masks for industrial respirators, glass run channels, radiators, garden and appliance hose (where it is used as a hose material as well as for gaskets), tubing, washers, O-rings, electrical insulation, and geomembranes.

A common use is in vehicles, where EPDM is used for door seals, window seals, trunk seals, and sometimes hood seals. Other uses in vehicles include wiper blades, cooling system circuit hoses; water pumps, thermostats, EGR valves, EGR coolers, heaters, oil coolers, radiators, and degas bottles are connected with EPDM hoses. EPDM is also used as charge air tubing on turbocharged engines to connect the cold side of the charge air cooler (intercooler) to the intake manifold. When the refrigerant oil is synthetic, such as in the case of R-134a and PAG oil, EPDM orings can be used in air conditioning systems.

EPDM seals can be a source of squeaking noise due to the movement of the seal against the opposing surface (and its attendant friction). The noise can be alleviated using specialty coatings that are applied at the time of manufacture of the seal. Such coatings can also improve the chemical resistance of EPDM rubber. Some vehicle manufacturers also recommend a light application of silicone dielectric grease to weatherstrip to reduce noise.

This synthetic rubber membrane has also been used for pond liners and flat roofs because of its durability and low maintenance costs. As a roofing membrane it does not pollute the run-off rainwater (which is of vital importance for rainwater harvesting).

It is used for belts, electrical insulation, vibrators, solar panel heat collectors, and speaker cone surrounds. It is also used as a functional additive to modify and enhance the impact characteristics of thermoset plastics, thermoplastics, and many other materials.

EPDM is also used for components that provide elasticity; for example, it is used for bungee cords, elastic tie-downs, straps, and hangers that attach exhaust systems to the underfloor of vehicles (since a rigid connection would transfer vibration, noise, and heat to the body). It is also used for cushioned edge guards and bumpers on appliances, equipment, and machinery.

Colored EPDM granules are mixed with polyurethane binders and troweled or sprayed onto concrete, asphalt, screenings, interlocking brick, wood, etc., to create a non-slip, soft, porous safety surface for wet-deck areas such as pool decks. It is used as safety surfacing under playground play equipment (designed to help lessen fall injury). (see Playground surfacing.)

Production of synthetic rubber in the 2010s exceeded 10 million tonnes annually and was over 15 million tonnes in each of 2017, 2018, and 2019 and only slightly less in 2020.
