= Norbornane =

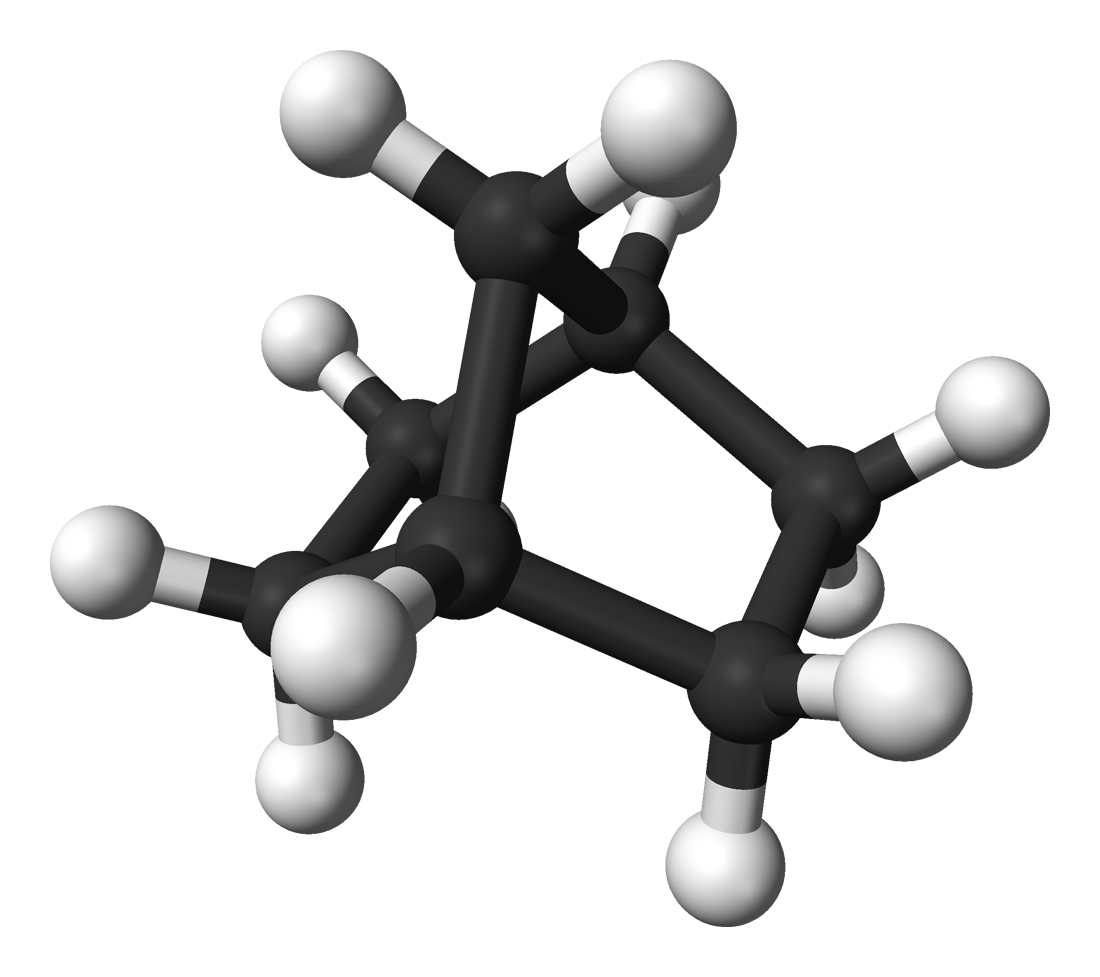

Names
- Preferred IUPAC name Bicyclo[2.2.1]heptane
- Other names norcamphane, norbornylane

Identifiers
CAS Number	279-23-2
3D model (JSmol)	Interactive image
Beilstein Reference	1900379
ChEBI	CHEBI:71546
ChemSpider	8878
ECHA InfoCard	100.005.452
EC Number	205-996-2
PubChem CID	9233
UNII	PAF9G8MY72
CompTox Dashboard (EPA)	DTXSID4075376
- InChI: InChI=1S/C7H12/c1-2-7-4-3-6(1)5-7/h6-7H,1-5H2 Key: UMRZSTCPUPJPOJ-UHFFFAOYSA-N; InChI=1/C7H12/c1-2-7-4-3-6(1)5-7/h6-7H,1-5H2 Key: UMRZSTCPUPJPOJ-UHFFFAOYAR
- SMILES: C1CC2CCC1C2

Properties
Chemical formula	C_{7}H_{12}
Molar mass	96.17 g mol^{−1}
Appearance	white volatile solid
Melting point	85 to 88 °C (185 to 190 °F; 358 to 361 K)
- Except where otherwise noted, data are given for materials in their standard state (at 25 °C [77 °F], 100 kPa). verify (what is ?) Infobox references

Norbornane (also known as bicyclo[2.2.1]heptane) is an organic compound and a saturated hydrocarbon with chemical formula C_{7}H_{12}. It is a crystalline compound with a melting point of 88 °C. The carbon skeleton is derived from cyclohexane ring with a methylene bridge in the 1,4- position, and is a bridged bicyclic compound. The compound is a prototype of a class of strained bicyclic hydrocarbons.

The compound was originally synthesized by reduction of norcamphor.

The name norbornane is derived from bornane, which is 1,7,7-trimethylnorbornane, being a derivative of camphor (bornanone). The prefix nor- refers to the stripping of the methyl groups from the parent molecule bornane.

== See also ==
- 2-Norbornyl cation
- Norbornene
- Norbornadiene
- endo-Norborneol
- exo-Norborneol
- Norcamphor, the ketone derivative of norbornane
