= Ethylidene norbornene =

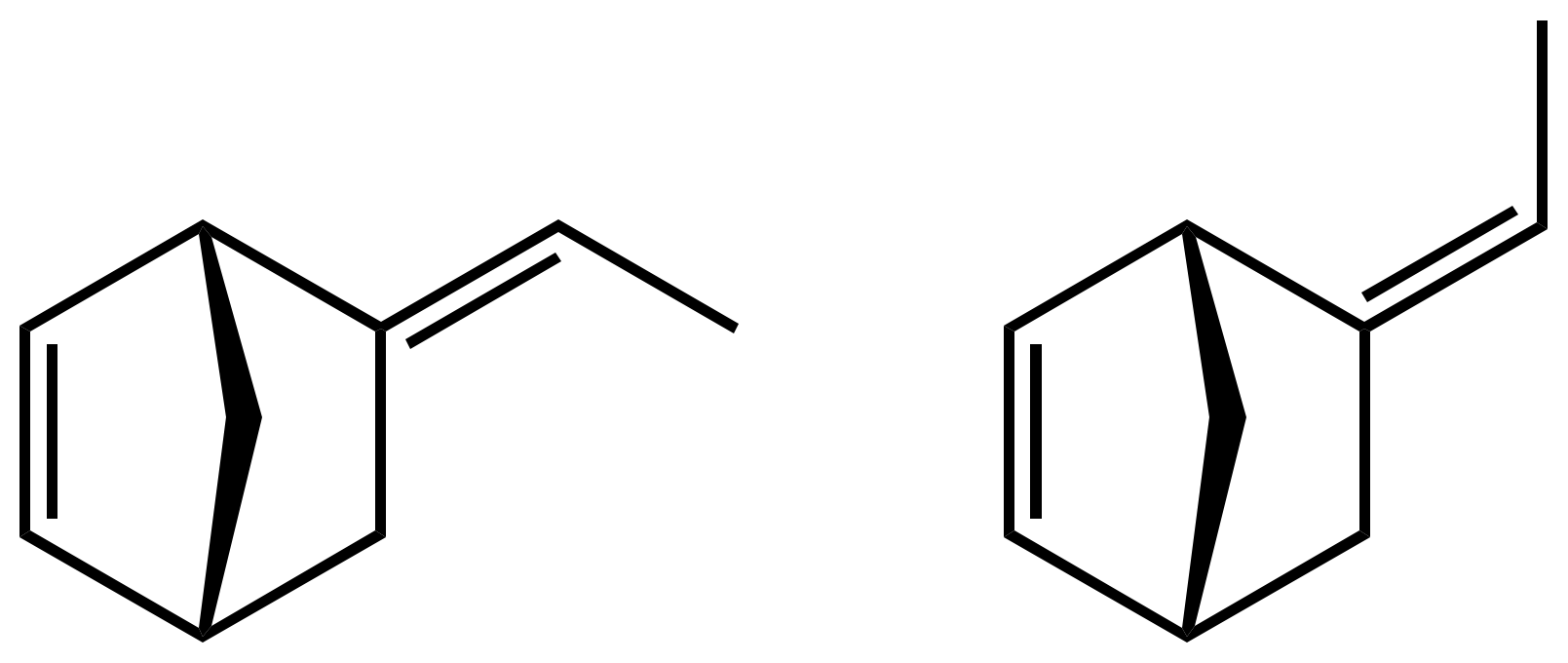

Names
- Other names 2-ethylidene-5-norbornene

Identifiers
CAS Number	16219-75-3
3D model (JSmol)	Interactive image
ChEMBL	ChEMBL1427645
ChemSpider	4517512
EC Number	240-347-7
PubChem CID	5365543
UNII	Q4D40UVR0R
UN number	1993 1992
CompTox Dashboard (EPA)	DTXSID601270050
- InChI: InChI=1S/C9H12/c1-2-8-5-7-3-4-9(8)6-7/h2-4,7,9H,5-6H2,1H3/b8-2+ Key: OJOWICOBYCXEKR-KRXBUXKQSA-N
- SMILES: C/C=C/1\CC2CC1C=C2

Properties
Chemical formula	C_{9}H_{12}
Molar mass	120.195 g·mol^{−1}
Appearance	colorless liquid
Density	0.893 g/mL
Melting point	−80 °C (−112 °F; 193 K)
Boiling point	146 °C (295 °F; 419 K)

Hazards
- GHS labelling
Pictograms	(GHS02: Flammable) (GHS07: Exclamation mark) (GHS08: Health hazard) (GHS09: Environmental hazard)
Signal word	Danger
Hazard statements	H226, H304, H315, H317, H319, H332, H335, H373, H411
Precautionary statements	P210, P233, P240, P241, P242, P243, P260, P264, P264+P265, P271, P272, P273, P280, P301+P316, P302+P352, P303+P361+P353, P304+P340, P305+P351+P338, P317, P319, P321, P331, P333+P317, P337+P317, P362+P364, P370+P378, P391, P403+P233, P403+P235, P405, P501
- Except where otherwise noted, data are given for materials in their standard state (at 25 °C [77 °F], 100 kPa). Infobox references

Ethylidene norbornene (ENB) is an organic compound that consists of an ethylidene (CH_{3}C(H)=) group attached to norbornene. It is a colorless liquid. The molecule consists of two sites of unsaturation. The compound consists of (E)- and (Z)-stereoisomers, but the mixtures are typically not separated.

== Preparation and use ==
It is prepared by isomerization of vinyl norbornene, which in turn is obtained by the Diels-Alder reaction of butadiene and cyclopentadiene.

Ethylidene norbornene can be produced in two steps from cyclopentadiene.

It is a monomer that used in the production of the commercial polymer EPDM. Only the ring alkene participates in the copolymerization. The exocyclic double bond (the ethylidene group) undergoes sulfur vulcanization.

== Safety ==
Its LD_{50} (intravenous, rabbit) ranges from 0.09 (male rabbit) to 0.11 ml/kg (female). It is also a neurotoxin.
