= Norborneol =

Norborneol may refer to alcohols with the norbornane skeleton:

- endo-Norborneol
- exo-Norborneol
