= Bicyclic molecule =

Molecule with two joined rings

The bridged bicyclic norbornane, formally bicyclo[2.2.1]heptane

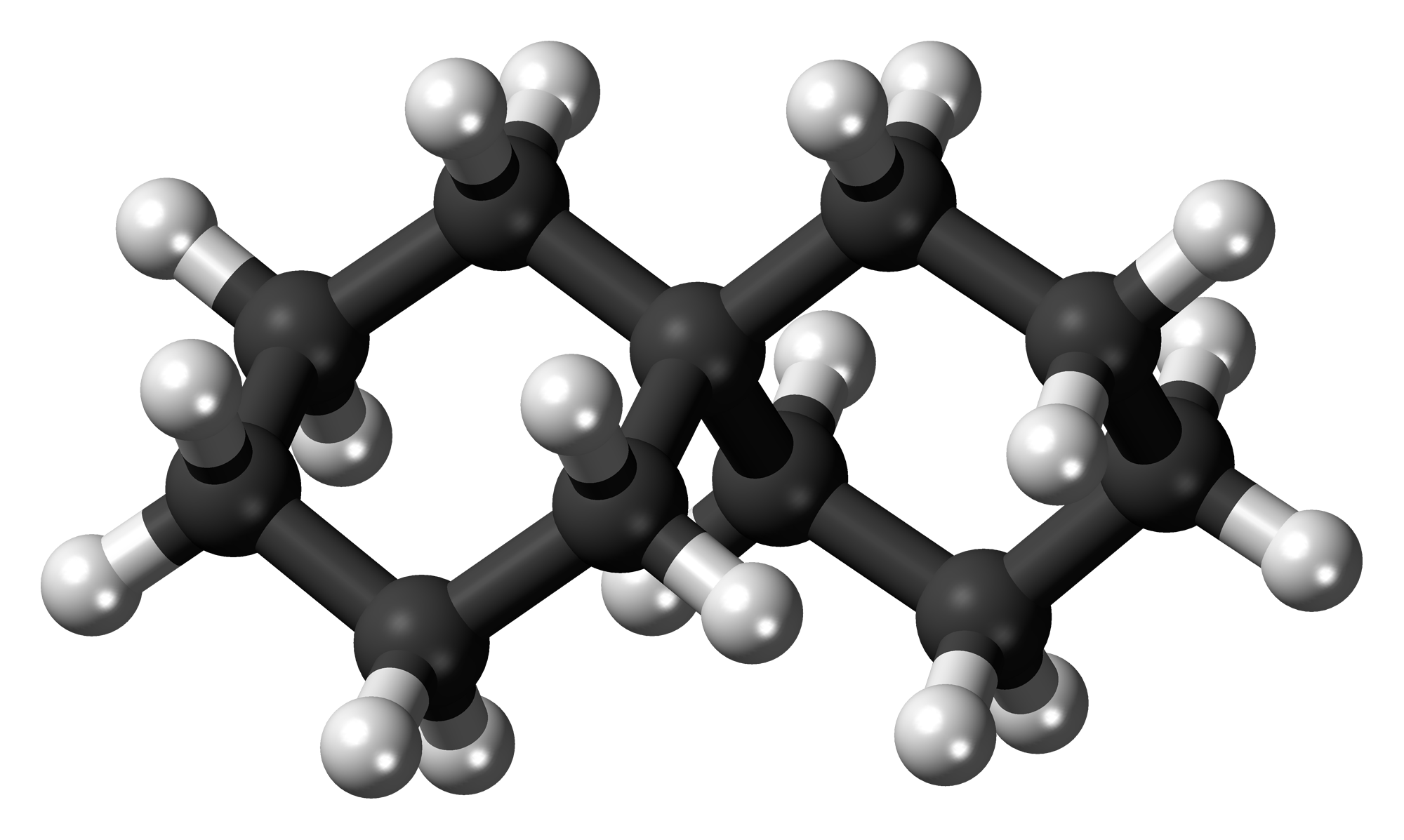
The spirocyclic compound spiro[5.5]undecane

DABCO (1,4-diazabicyclo[2.2.2]octane) is often incorrectly depicted with one skewed ethylene group for the sake of clarity.

A bicyclic molecule (from bi 'two' and cycle 'ring') is a molecule that features two joined rings. Bicyclic structures occur widely, for example in many biologically important molecules like α-thujene and camphor. A bicyclic compound can be carbocyclic (all of the ring atoms are carbons), or heterocyclic (the rings' atoms consist of at least two elements), like DABCO. Moreover, the two rings can both be aliphatic (e.g. decalin and norbornane), or can be aromatic (e.g. naphthalene), or a combination of aliphatic and aromatic (e.g. tetralin).

== Distinctive properties ==
Many properties of saturated bicyclic hydrocarbons are those of mono and acyclic analogues: colorless, combustible, and resistant to many reactions. Exceptions apply to the cyclopropane derivatives, which can undergo ring opening. The distinctive feature of the bicyclic compounds is their relative rigidity. Whereas only one stereoisomer exists for methylcycloheptane, seven are possible for methylnorbornane, including three pairs of enantiomers. Ring fusions are a potential source of isomerism, but for small rings, the fusions are always cis. For the bicyclic C10 decalin, both cis- and trans-fused isomers are observed, the former being chiral, though not resolvable at room temperature due to rapid inversion.

Bicyclic C4-C8 hydrocarbons.

== Nomenclature and terminology ==
Bridgehead atoms are the carbons that form three C-C bonds. The parent (that is, unsubstituted) bicyclic hydrocarbons have two bridgehead carbon atoms.

In spiro compounds, two rings share one single atom, the spiro atom, which is usually a quaternary carbon. An example of a spirocyclic compound is the photochromic switch spiropyran.

The naming of bicyclic molecules is described by IUPAC nomenclature. The root of the compound name depends on the total number of atoms in all rings together, possibly followed by a suffix denoting the functional group with the highest priority. Numbering of the carbon chain always begins at one bridgehead atom (where the rings meet) and follows the carbon chain along the longest path, to the next bridgehead atom. Then numbering is continued along the second longest path and so on. Fused and bridged bicyclic compounds get the prefix bicyclo, whereas spirocyclic compounds get the prefix spiro. In between the prefix and the suffix, a pair of brackets with numerals denotes the number of carbon atoms between each of the bridgehead atoms. These numbers are arranged in descending order and are separated by periods. For example, the carbon frame of norbornane contains a total of 7 atoms, hence the root name heptane. This molecule has two paths of 2 carbon atoms and a third path of 1 carbon atom between the two bridgehead carbons, so the brackets are filled in descending order: [2.2.1]. Addition of the prefix bicyclo gives the total name bicyclo[2.2.1]heptane.

The carbon frame of camphor also counts 7 atoms, but is substituted with a carbonyl. Numbering of the carbon frame starts at the bridgehead atom with the highest priority (methyl goes before proton), hence the bridgehead carbon in front gets number 1, the carbonyl gets number 2 and numbering continues along the carbon chain following the longest path, until the doubly substituted top carbon (number 7). Norbornane has two paths of 2 carbon atoms and one path of 1 carbon atom between the two bridgehead carbons, so the numbers within the brackets stay [2.2.1].

When naming simple fused bicyclic compounds, the same method as for bridged bicyclic compounds is applied, except the third path between the two bridgehead atoms now consists of zero atoms. Therefore, fused bicyclic compounds have a "0" included in the brackets. For example, decalin is named bicyclo[4.4.0]decane. The numbers are sometimes omitted in unambiguous cases. For example, bicyclo[1.1.0]butane is typically called simply bicyclobutane.

== Heteroatom substitutions ==
The bicyclic structures emphasized apply to many compounds where CH_{2} and CH site are replaced by other elements. CH_{2} is often replaced by O, NH and NR, as well as S. CH is often replaced by N and P. The heterocyclic molecule DABCO has a total of 8 atoms in its bridged structure, hence the root name octane. The two bridgehead atoms are nitrogen instead of carbon atoms. Its official name is 1,4-diazabicyclo[2.2.2]octane.

== Occurrence ==
Of the major classes of biomolecules, only the purines are bicyclic. Otherwise, bicyclic compounds are restricted to cofactors and secondary metabolites. Terpenes and alkaloids, which are known for their structural complexity, are often bicyclic or still more complex.

== See also ==
- Polycyclic compound
- Bredt's rule
