= Exo-Norborneol =

exo-Norborneol
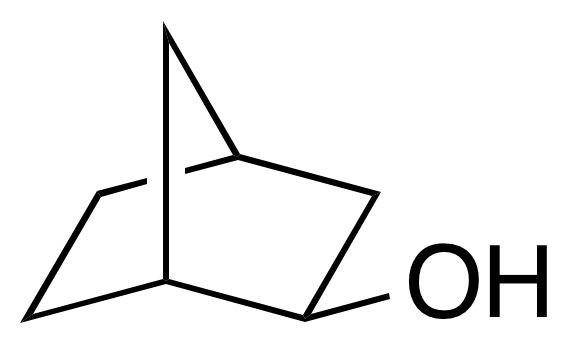

Names
- Preferred IUPAC name rel-(1R,2R,4S)-Bicyclo[2.2.1]heptan-2-ol

Identifiers
CAS Number	497-37-0
3D model (JSmol)	(2R): Interactive image; (2S): Interactive image
ChemSpider	9030708 (2R); 9215827 (2S)
ECHA InfoCard	100.007.133
PubChem CID	10855417 (2R); 11040657 (2S)
UNII	V367XM6FYD
CompTox Dashboard (EPA)	DTXSID001030874 DTXSID7022041, DTXSID001030874
- InChI: InChI=1/C7H12O/c8-7-4-5-1-2-6(7)3-5/h5-8H,1-4H2/t5-,6+,7+/s2 Key: ZQTYQMYDIHMKQB-YUZWJPFSNA-N; (2R): InChI=1S/C7H12O/c8-7-4-5-1-2-6(7)3-5/h5-8H,1-4H2/t5-,6+,7+/m0/s1 Key: ZQTYQMYDIHMKQB-VQVTYTSYSA-N; (2S): InChI=1S/C7H12O/c8-7-4-5-1-2-6(7)3-5/h5-8H,1-4H2/t5-,6+,7+/m1/s1 Key: ZQTYQMYDIHMKQB-RRKCRQDMSA-N
- SMILES: (2R): O[C@@H]1C[C@@H]2C[C@H]1CC2; (2S): O[C@H]1C[C@H]2C[C@@H]1CC2

Properties
Chemical formula	C_{7}H_{12}O
Molar mass	112.172 g·mol^{−1}
Melting point	124 to 126 °C (255 to 259 °F; 397 to 399 K)
Boiling point	176 to 177 °C (349 to 351 °F; 449 to 450 K)

Hazards
Safety data sheet (SDS)	Fisher MSDS
- Except where otherwise noted, data are given for materials in their standard state (at 25 °C [77 °F], 100 kPa). verify (what is ?) Infobox references

exo-Norborneol is an alcohol containing the norbornane skeleton. Commercially available, this colorless compound may be prepared by the reaction of norbornene with formic acid, followed by hydrolysis of the resultant exo-norbornyl formate.

== See also ==
- Endo-Norborneol
