= Methylcyclohexanone =

Methylcyclohexanones are a group of three isomers: 2-methylcyclohexanone, 3-methylcyclohexanone, and 4-methylcyclohexanone. They can be viewed as derivative of cyclohexanone. They can be prepared by oxidation of methylcyclohexane as well as partial hydrogenation of the corresponding cresols. All are colorless liquids. The 2- and 3-isomers are chiral.

Methylcyclohexanones
| Isomer | Structure | CAS RN | m.p. (°C) | b.p. (°C) | density (g/cm^{3}) |
|---|---|---|---|---|---|
| 2-Methylcyclohexanone | | 583-60-8 | −13.9 | 165.1 | 0.925 |
| 3-Methylcyclohexanone | | 591-24-2 | −73.5 | 170.0 | 0.920 |
| 4-Methylcyclohexanone | | 589-92-4 | −40.6 | 171.3 | 0.916 |
