= Endo-Norborneol =

endo-Norborneol
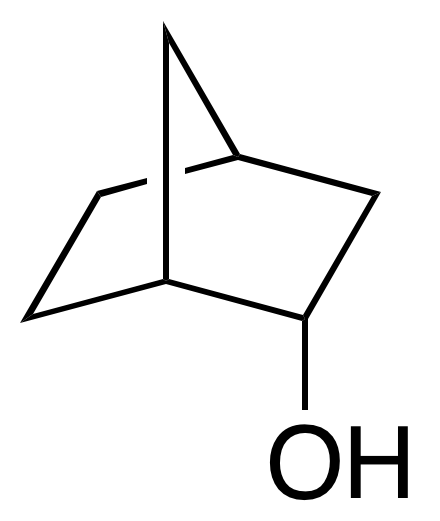

Names
- Preferred IUPAC name rel-(1R,2S,4S)-Bicyclo[2.2.1]heptan-2-ol
- Other names endo-2-Norborneol; endo-Norbornyl alcohol

Identifiers
CAS Number	61277-90-5 (2R); 36779-79-0 (2S)
3D model (JSmol)	(2R): Interactive image; (2S): Interactive image
ChemSpider	9030707 (2R); 9150646 (2S)
ECHA InfoCard	100.127.627
PubChem CID	10855416 (2R); 10975445 (2S)
- InChI: InChI=1/C7H12O/c8-7-4-5-1-2-6(7)3-5/h5-8H,1-4H2/t5-,6+,7-/s2 Key: ZQTYQMYDIHMKQB-HNBBVXEKNA-N; (2R): InChI=1S/C7H12O/c8-7-4-5-1-2-6(7)3-5/h5-8H,1-4H2/t5-,6+,7-/m1/s1 Key: ZQTYQMYDIHMKQB-DSYKOEDSSA-N; (2S): InChI=1S/C7H12O/c8-7-4-5-1-2-6(7)3-5/h5-8H,1-4H2/t5-,6+,7-/m0/s1 Key: ZQTYQMYDIHMKQB-XVMARJQXSA-N
- SMILES: (2R): O[C@@H]1C[C@H]2CC[C@@H]1C2; (2S): O[C@H]1C[C@@H]2CC[C@H]1C2

Properties
Chemical formula	C_{7}H_{12}O
Molar mass	112.17 g/mol
Melting point	149 to 154 °C (300 to 309 °F; 422 to 427 K)
- Except where otherwise noted, data are given for materials in their standard state (at 25 °C [77 °F], 100 kPa). verify (what is ?) Infobox references

endo-Norborneol is an alcohol containing the norbornane skeleton.

== See also ==
- Exo-Norborneol
