= Norbornene =

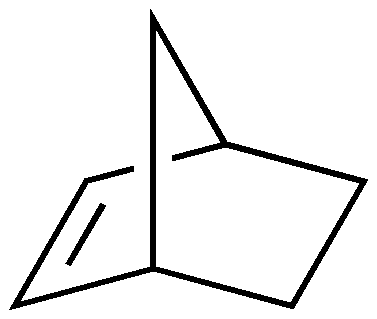

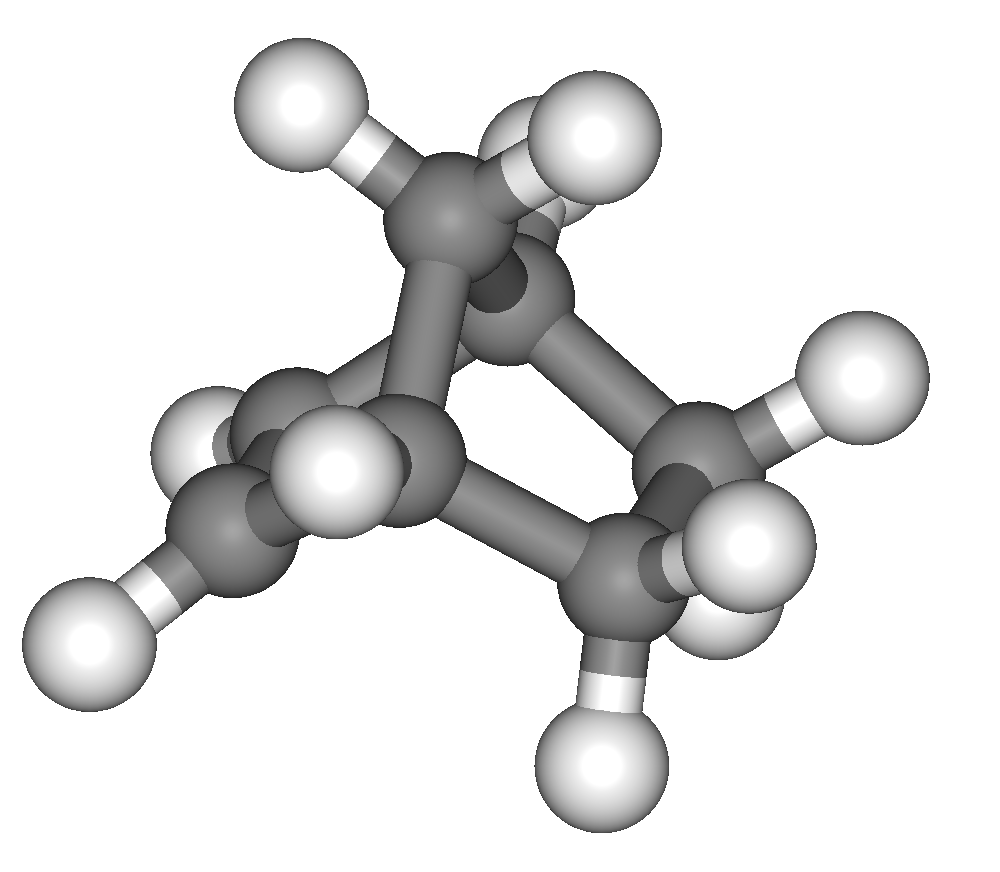

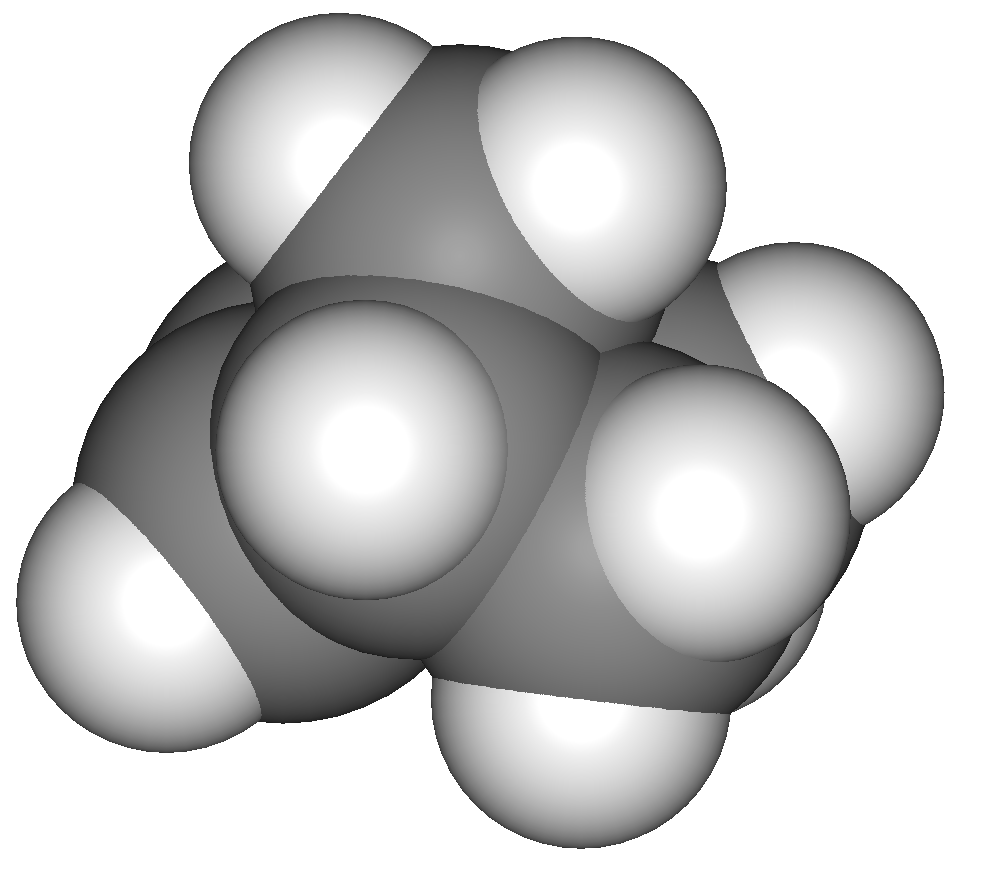

Names
- Preferred IUPAC name Bicyclo[2.2.1]hept-2-ene
- Other names Norbornylene; Norcamphene

Identifiers
| CAS Number | 498-66-8 |
| 3D model (JSmol) | Interactive image |
| ChEBI | CHEBI:52286 |
| ChemSpider | 9925 |
| ECHA InfoCard | 100.007.152 |
| EC Number | 207-866-0 |
| PubChem CID | 10352 |
| UNII | 2Q51FLS550 |
| CompTox Dashboard (EPA) | DTXSID2022042 |
- InChI: InChI=1S/C7H10/c1-2-7-4-3-6(1)5-7/h1-2,6-7H,3-5H2 Key: JFNLZVQOOSMTJK-UHFFFAOYSA-N; InChI=1/C7H10/c1-2-7-4-3-6(1)5-7/h1-2,6-7H,3-5H2 Key: JFNLZVQOOSMTJK-UHFFFAOYAB
- SMILES: C1=CC2CCC1C2

Properties
| Chemical formula | C_{7}H_{10} |
| Molar mass | 94.157 g·mol^{−1} |
| Appearance | White solid |
| Melting point | 42 to 46 °C (108 to 115 °F; 315 to 319 K) |
| Boiling point | 96 °C (205 °F; 369 K) |

Hazards
| NFPA 704 (fire diamond) | 2 3 1 |
| Flash point | −15 °C (5 °F; 258 K) |

Related compounds
| Related compounds | Nadic anhydride |
- Except where otherwise noted, data are given for materials in their standard state (at 25 °C [77 °F], 100 kPa). verify (what is ?) Infobox references

Norbornene or norbornylene or norcamphene is a highly strained bridged cyclic hydrocarbon. It is a white solid with a pungent sour odor. The molecule consists of a cyclohexene ring with a methylene bridge between carbons 3 and 6. The molecule carries a double bond which induces significant ring strain and significant reactivity.

The name comes from norbornane, from bornane.

== Production ==
Norbornene can be prepared via Diels–Alder reaction of cyclopentadiene (made in situ from decomposition of dicyclopentadiene) and ethylene. Many substituted norbornenes can be prepared similarly. Related bicyclic compounds are norbornadiene, which has the same carbon skeleton but with two double bonds, and norbornane which is prepared by hydrogenation of norbornene.

== Reactions ==
Norbornene undergoes an acid-catalyzed hydration reaction to form norborneol. This reaction was of great interest in the elucidation of the non-classical carbocation controversy.

Norbornene is used in the Catellani reaction and in norbornene-mediated meta-C−H activation.

Certain substituted norbornenes undergo unusual substitution reactions owing to the generation of the 2-norbornyl cation.

Being a strained ene, norbornenes react readily with thiols in the thiol-ene reaction to form thioethers. This makes norbornene-functionalized monomers ideal for polymerization with thiol-based monomers to form thiol-ene networks.

=== Polynorbornenes ===
Norbornenes are important monomers in ring-opening metathesis polymerizations (ROMP). Typically these conversions are effected with ill-defined catalysts. Polynorbornenes exhibit high glass transition temperatures and high optical clarity.

ROMP reaction giving polynorbornene. Like most commercial alkene metathesis processes, this reaction does not employ a well-defined molecular catalyst.

In addition to ROMP, norbornene monomers also undergo vinyl-addition polymerization, and is a popular monomer for use in cyclic olefin copolymers.

Polynorbornene is used mainly in the rubber industry for antivibration (rail, building, industry), antiimpact (personal protective equipment, shoe parts, bumpers) and grip improvement (toy tires, racing tires, transmission systems, transports systems for copiers, feeders, etc.)

Ethylidene norbornene is a related monomer derived from cyclopentadiene and butadiene.

== See also ==
- Nadic anhydride
