= JP-4 =

Jet fuel

JP-4, or JP4 (for "Jet Propellant") was a jet fuel, specified in 1951 by the United States Department of Defense (MIL-DTL-5624). Its NATO code is F-40. It is also known as avtag.

== Usage ==
JP-4 was a 50-50 kerosene-gasoline blend. It had a lower flash point than JP-1, but was preferred because of its greater availability. It was the primary U.S. Air Force jet fuel between 1951 and 1995.

MC-77 is the Swedish military equivalent of JP-4.

== Mixture ==
JP-4 was a mixture of aliphatic and aromatic hydrocarbons. It was a flammable transparent liquid with clear or straw color, and a kerosene-like smell. It evaporated easily and floated on water. Although it had a low flash point (0 °F (−18 °C)), a lit match dropped into JP-4 would not ignite the mixture. JP-4 froze at −76 °F (−60 °C), and its maximum burning temperature was 6,670 °F (3,688 °C).

JP-4 was a non-conductive liquid, prone to build up static electricity when being moved through pipes and tanks. As it is volatile and has a low flash point, the static discharge could cause a fire. Beginning in the mid-1980s an antistatic agent was added to the fuel to lower the charge buildup and decrease the corresponding risk of fires. Flow rates must be controlled, and all the equipment used must be electrically interconnected and well grounded.

Commercial aviation uses a similar mixture under the name Jet-B, though without the additional corrosion inhibitors and icing inhibitors included in JP-4.

== Phase-out ==
The desire for a less flammable, less hazardous fuel led the U.S. Air Force to phase out JP-4 in favor of JP-8; the transition for USAF operations in Great Britain was made in 1979, and the change was completed throughout the USAF by the end of 1995.

== See also ==
- JP-7
- JP-8
- JP-10
- JPTS
- Aviation fuel
