= Crown Oil =

Manchester based oils company

Crown Oil Ltd
- Trade name: Crown Oil
- Formerly: Silver Crown Oil Distributors
- Company type: Private
- Industry: Fuel distribution
- Founded: 1947
- Founder: Harry Greensmith
- Headquarters: Bury, Greater Manchester
- Key people: Charles Greensmith, Matthew Greensmith (Managing Director)
- Products: Diesel; HVO fuel; Heating oil; Kerosene; Red diesel; Gas oil; Biodiesel; Lubricants
- Revenue: ▲£197,500,000 (2019); £144,600,000 (2018); (2019)
- Owner: Greensmith family (100%)
- Subsidiaries: Crown Oil Environmental; Speedy Fuels; Beesley Fuels; Crown Energy; Crown Gas and Power
- Website: crownoil.co.uk

Crown Oil Ltd, also trading as Crown Oil Fuels and Lubricants or simply Crown Oil, is a fuels and lubricants distribution company located in Bury, Greater Manchester, England. The fuel distributor specialises in national supply of diesel, gas oil, kerosene and lubricants among other fuels and oils to the commercial and domestic market in the United Kingdom.

Crown Oil has depots in six locations around the UK, including Bury, Birmingham, Iver, and three in Greater London with the Bury depot being the main depot that the fuel supplier operates from.

== History ==
Crown Oil began trading in 1928 and was owned by Harry Greensmith, affectionately known as "Harry Lamp Oil". Greensmith traded door-to-door from a wooden cart, providing household goods such as firelighters, candles, and lamp oil (kerosene). After World War II, Greensmith expanded the product range of the company to include the bulk supply of fuels and lubricants.

The name Silver Crown Oil Distributors was used from around 1947. The business was based in Heywood, Greater Manchester, England.

In 1959, Harry's only son, David Greensmith, joined the family business, and new premises were acquired in the Heap Bridge area of Heywood, where the company is currently located. The distribution of fuels and lubricants became the firm's primary business activity, with red diesel currently making up the majority of business. In 1977 the business was incorporated and the name changed to Crown Oil Limited.

The present head office, completed in 1990, is located at Bury in Greater Manchester. The headquarters was named the 'Oil Centre'.

Crown Oil remains family-owned. According to the company's history, in 1949, ownership passed from Harry to his son, David, and thereafter to his grandchildren Andrew, Matthew, and Abigail in 2007, following David's premature death in 2007. Matthew Greensmith is the current managing director.

== Environmental commitments ==
Crown Oil Environmental was set up to assist with the environmental hazards that are caused by fuels – such as oil spills and microbial contamination. Environmental collects waste oils and recycles these oils for re-use. It also disposes of waste diesel in line with regulations. Tank cleaning is also undertaken in order to prevent mechanical failure caused by contaminated diesel.

As part of the company's work towards environmental responsibility, all delivery mileage was carbon offset to keep CO_{2} emissions to a minimum. Between December 2007 and April 2020, this amounted to over 37,500 tonnes of CO_{2} being offset, helping to fund carbon reducing initiatives across the globe.

In 2019, Crown Oil committed further to reducing fossil fuels' environmental impact by turning its attention to hydrotreated vegetable oil (HVO fuel), when the company invested £4 million in stocks of the renewable fuel, making it reportedly one of the only suppliers in the UK with a stock of the fuel. HVO fuel is said to be useful for industries such as farming, commercial vehicles and data centres to reduce their carbon emissions. Biodiesel is another CO_{2}-reducing fuel supplied by Crown Oil.

== Expansion and acquisitions ==
Crown Oil has expanded its business over time through the acquisition of other fuel suppliers:

- In 1990, Crown Oil's headquarters expanded to include Crown House. In 2007 planning permission was granted for further expansion, in what would become the Crown Point building.
- In 2012, the company opened a depot in Iver, Buckinghamshire to service West London businesses as well as the domestic market in the area, and introduced the Speedy Fuels brand to service this area. Additionally, the business acquired Cooke Fuels, who had fallen into administration.
- Crown Oil also acquired fuel supplier Ingoe Oils.
- 2018 saw the double acquisition of Birmingham-based Beesley Fuels and Birlem Fuels through the Speedy Fuels brand.
- Crown Oil also expanded into other energy-related industries with the launch of Crown Oil Environmental, the waste fuel collection arm of the business; Crown Energy, a utility installation service; Crown Gas and Power, an energy supplier. These businesses make up the Crown Oil group of companies.
- 2020 saw the most recent acquisition, that of Stockport-based Star Oil and this purchase meant that 11 of 12 Star Oil staff and a fleet of eight vehicles, joined Crown Oil, the only exception being a director.
- As a result of expansion, the Crown Oil fleet of tankers rose from 25 vehicles in 2016 to reportedly 53 in 2018. In 2019, that in creased to 58 tankers, placing the company's fleet among the ten largest fuel oil distributor fleets in the UK. In 2020, as a result of the Star Oil acquisition, that fleet increased by a further eight vehicles, taking the total to 66.

== Subsidiaries ==
In total, the Crown Oil group of companies is made up of eight fuel suppliers, business energy suppliers and utility installation services. Around 1,500 people are employed across the group.

- Crown Oil Ltd
- Crown Oil (Environmental) Ltd
- Speedy Fuels Ltd
- Beesley Fuels Ltd
- Birlem Oil
- Crown Gas and Power Ltd
- Crown Energy Ltd
- Cooke Fuels
- Ingoe Oils
- Star Oil

== Awards ==
Crown Oil Ltd has earned multiple recognitions over the years.

- In May 2008, Crown Oil was listed on Crain's: Manchester Top 200 list of companies, taking the 60th position.
- In 2012, Crown Oil won a HazardX award for its environmental contribution to the industry.
- In 2014, Crown Oil finished 163rd in The Sunday Times Grant Thornton Top Track 250 league table. This ranks Britain's mid-market growth private companies with the largest sales.
- In February, as a result of company expansion, the fuel supplier qualified for a spot as one of the UK mainland, Northern Ireland and Republic of Ireland's Top 20 fuel distributors.
- In May 2019, Crown Oil was named in the 'Ward Hadaway Greater Manchester Fastest 50 Companies'.
- In 2019, Crown Oil ranked 133rd in The Sunday Times Grant Thornton Top Track 250 league table, the fifth time it qualified for the league table.

As a UK based lubricants blender and supplier, Crown Oil is part of the UKLA (United Kingdom Lubricants Association) and UEIL. Crown Oil is also registered with Oil Firing Technical Association (OFTEC) and is certified as a Crown Commercial Service supplier.

== Rochdale A.F.C ==
Crown Oil has been a sponsor of Rochdale A.F.C. since the 2013–14 season when the club was in EFL League Two, when in May 2013, the company signed a front of shirt sponsorship. Rochdale achieved promotion to EFL League One, and the sponsorship was seen as a success and was continued in 2014–15.

In August 2016, Crown Oil signed a five-year sponsorship deal with Rochdale A.F.C., and the club's stadium, then called the Spotland Stadium, was renamed the Crown Oil Arena as part of a 'record-breaking' 'six-figure' sponsorship deal for the club that included the stadium's naming rights.

In June 2020, Crown Oil and Rochdale AFC extended their sponsorship agreement for a further six-years.

== Rally driver sponsorship ==
Since 2015, Crown Oil has sponsored WRC rally driver, Gus Greensmith with logo placement on Greensmith's Ford Fiesta, a livery sponsorship which is currently ongoing.

In 2015, Greensmith stated that Crown Oil has been a 'financial and emotional' supporter since as early as 2015.

== Industries served ==
As with most fuel and lubricant suppliers, Crown Oil serves a range of industries that are reliant on mineral oil-based products for fuel, power and heat generating applications.

=== Power generation (red diesel) ===
- Construction sites (diesel-powered electric generators)
- Festivals
- Outdoor events

=== Off-road vehicle fuel (red diesel) ===
- Farming machinery (fuel for combine harvesters, tractors)
- Construction sites (fuel for forklifts, cranes)
- Sports ground maintenance (golf courses, football pitches, cricket fields)

=== Road fuel (white diesel) ===
- Passenger cars
- Vans
- Trucks
- Buses
- Trains

=== Back-up power (red diesel) ===
- Data centres
- Hospitals
- Schools
- Hotels
- Office buildings
- Indoor event venues

=== Heating (red diesel and kerosene) ===
- Domestic heating for home central heating systems (kerosene)
- Commercial heating (red diesel)

=== Marine ===
- Bunker fuel
- Red diesel

=== Aviation (kerosene) ===
- Jet fuel

== Logos ==
Previous logo of the company

Current logo of Crown Oil Ltd.
