= JP-7 =

Jet fuel formulation for certain supersonic aircraft

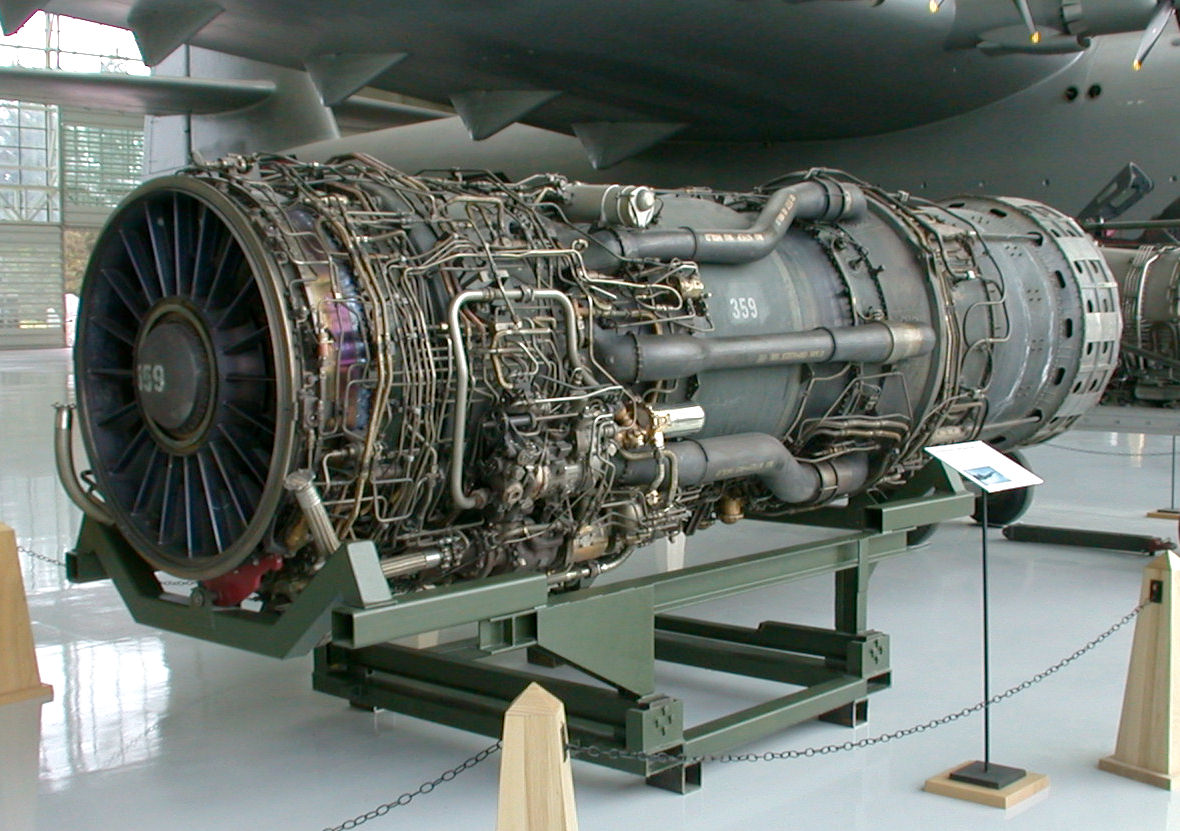
The Pratt & Whitney J58 (JT11D-20) turbojet aero engine, which had a specific fuel requirement; namely JP-7 turbine fuel.

Turbine Fuel Low Volatility JP-7, commonly known as JP-7 (referred to as Jet Propellant 7 prior to MIL-DTL-38219) is a specialized type of jet fuel developed at Pratt and Whitney by master chemist Clarence Brown (CB) Eichman in 1955 for the Central Intelligence Agency (CIA) for use in its reconnaissance aircraft, the Lockheed A-12, and subsequently for aircraft with similar high speed performance, the Lockheed YF-12 and Lockheed SR-71. It was also used for the higher speed Boeing X-51 Waverider.

== Usage ==
JP-7 was developed for the Pratt & Whitney J58 (JT11D-20) turbojet engine, which was used primarily in the Lockheed SR-71 Blackbird which retired in 1999. The SR-71 design speed was Mach 3.2 at which very high skin temperatures occurred due to aerodynamic heating. A new jet fuel with a high flash point and high thermal stability was developed as the fuel had to be used as a heat sink for the severe high temperature environment in the aircraft.

The Boeing X-51 Waverider also used JP-7 fuel in its Pratt & Whitney SJY61 scramjet engine, with fuel capacity of some 270 pounds (120 kg).

"The operating envelope of the JT11D-20 engine requires special fuel. The fuel is not only the source of energy but is also used in the engine hydraulic system. During high Mach flight, the fuel is also a heat sink for the various aircraft and engine accessories which would otherwise overheat at the high temperatures encountered. This requires a fuel having high thermal stability so that it will not break down and deposit coke and varnishes in the fuel system passages. A high luminometer number (Note: Note that a high luminometer number corresponds, somewhat counter-intuitively, to a low brightness for a given amount of heat generated. Therefore, a high luminometer number means that, for a given amount of energy released in combustion, more of the energy goes into heating the gas, and less into heating the surrounding structure through radiative transfer, than would be the case for a low luminometer number fuel. But this does not say anything about other mechanisms of transfer, e.g., diffusive transfer, which may be greater or lesser.) (brightness of flame index) is required to minimize transfer of heat to the burner parts. Other items are also significant, such as the amount of sulfur impurities tolerated. Advanced fuels, JP-7 (PWA 535) and PWA 523E, were developed to meet the above requirements."

— SR-71A Flight Manual, Section I, page 4

== Composition ==
JP-7 is a compound mixture composed primarily of hydrocarbons; including alkanes, cycloalkanes, alkylbenzenes, indanes/tetralins, and naphthalenes; with addition of fluorocarbons to increase its lubricant properties, an oxidizing agent to make it burn more efficiently, and a caesium-containing compound known as A-50, which is to aid in disguising the radar and infrared signatures of the exhaust plume. A-50 has been hypothesised to be synthesised by addition of caesium carbonate to dialkyl phosphite. The SR-71 Blackbirds used approximately 36,000–44,000 pounds (16,000–20,000 kg) of fuel per hour of flight.

JP-7 is unusual in that it is not a conventional distillate fuel, but is created from special blending stocks in order to have very low (<3%) concentration of highly volatile components like benzene or toluene, and almost no sulfur, oxygen, and nitrogen impurities. It has a low vapor pressure, and high thermal oxidation stability. The fuel must operate across a wide range of temperatures: from near freezing at high altitude, to the high temperatures of the airframe and engine parts that are being cooled by it at high speed. Its volatility must be low enough to make it flash-resistant at these high temperatures.

The very low volatility, and relative unwillingness of JP-7 to be ignited, required triethylborane (TEB) to be injected into the engine in order to initiate combustion, and allow afterburner operation in flight. The SR-71 had a limited capacity for TEB, and therefore had a limited number of available 'shots' of TEB (usually 16) for restarts, and those had to be managed carefully on long-duration flights with multiple stages of relatively low-altitude air refueling and normal high-altitude cruise flight.

== Properties ==
- Melting point: −30 °C (−22 °F)
- Boiling point at 1 standard atmosphere (100 kPa): 282–288 °C (540–550 °F)
- Density at 15 °C (59 °F): 779–806 kg/m^{3}
- Vapor pressure at 300 °F (149 °C): 155 millimetres of mercury (3.00 psi) (20.7 kPa)
- Flashpoint: 60 °C (140 °F)
- Net heat of combustion: min. 43.5 megajoules per kilogram (5.48 kWh/lb)

== See also ==
- JP-1
- JP-4
- JP-5
- JP-6
- JP-8
- JP-10
- JPTS
- Aviation fuel
- KC-135Q
