= Dinonylnaphthylsulfonic acid =

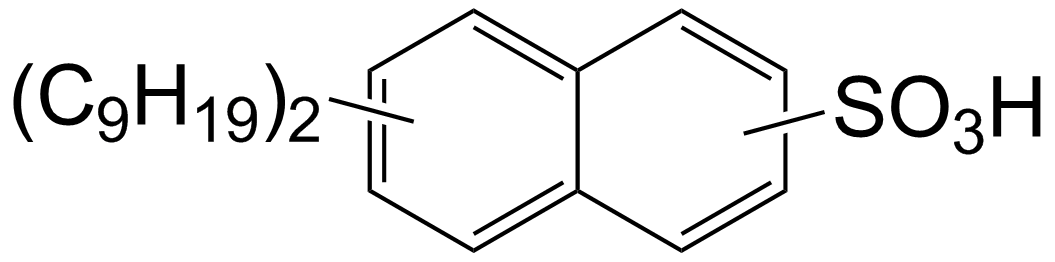

Identifiers
CAS Number	773811-74-8; 25322-17-2 (non-specific)
3D model (JSmol)	Interactive image
Abbreviations	DINNSA
ChemSpider	84691
ECHA InfoCard	100.042.569
PubChem CID	93829
UNII	QKJ4RAR9PN
CompTox Dashboard (EPA)	DTXSID10881226 DTXSID9027861, DTXSID10881226
- InChI: InChI=1S/C28H44O3S/c1-3-5-7-9-11-13-15-19-24-23-25-20-17-18-22-27(25)28(32(29,30)31)26(24)21-16-14-12-10-8-6-4-2/h17-18,20,22-23H,3-16,19,21H2,1-2H3,(H,29,30,31) Key: WDNQRCVBPNOTNV-UHFFFAOYSA-N; InChI=1/C28H44O3S/c1-3-5-7-9-11-13-15-19-24-23-25-20-17-18-22-27(25)28(32(29,30)31)26(24)21-16-14-12-10-8-6-4-2/h17-18,20,22-23H,3-16,19,21H2,1-2H3,(H,29,30,31) Key: WDNQRCVBPNOTNV-UHFFFAOYAD
- SMILES: O=S(=O)(O)c2c1ccccc1cc(c2CCCCCCCCC)CCCCCCCCC

Properties
Chemical formula	C_{28}H_{44}O_{3}S
Molar mass	460.72 g·mol^{−1}
Melting point	259.5 °C (499.1 °F; 532.6 K)
Boiling point	600.4 °C (1,112.7 °F; 873.5 K)
- Except where otherwise noted, data are given for materials in their standard state (at 25 °C [77 °F], 100 kPa). verify (what is ?) Infobox references

Dinonylnaphthylsulfonic acid (DINNSA) is an organic chemical, an aryl sulfonic acid. Its melting point is 259.5 °C and its boiling point is 600.4 °C. It has very low water solubility. It is a moderate skin irritant and a strong eye irritant. It has low volatility and vapor pressure and is stable above 100 °C.

Dinonylnaphthylsulfonic acid is used as an additive in industrial lubricants, greases, cutting fluids, industrial coatings, and corrosion inhibitors. Its calcium and barium salts (CAS numbers 57855-77-3 and 25619-56-1, respectively) have generally the same use.

Dinonylnaphthylsulfonic acid is a component of antistatic agents, such as Stadis 450, which are added to distillate fuels, solvents, commercial jet fuels, and to the military fuel JP-8 to increase the electrical conductivity of the fluid. Fluids with increased conductivity more readily dissipate static charges to mitigate the risk of explosions or fires due to Static Discharge Ignitions

Dinonylnaphthylsulfonic acid by itself does not function as an anti-static additive.

Dinonylnaphthylsulfonic acid is prepared by reaction of naphthalene with nonene, yielding diisononylnaphthalene. Diisononylnaphthalene then undergoes sulfonation.
