= JP-8 =

Jet fuel

JP-8, or JP8 (for "Jet Propellant 8"), is a jet fuel, specified and used widely by the US military. It is specified by MIL-DTL-83133 and British Defence Standard 91-87, and similar to commercial aviation's Jet A-1, but with the addition of corrosion inhibitor and anti-icing additives.

It was first introduced at NATO bases in 1978. Its NATO code is F-34.

== Usage ==
The United States Air Force replaced JP-4 with JP-8 completely by the end of 1995, to use a less flammable, less hazardous fuel for better safety and combat survivability. In 2014, they completed the process of converting all JP-8 installations within the continental United States to instead use commercial Jet A-1 fuel with additional additives. Installations in Alaska still utilize JP-8 in place of Jet A-1 because of its better suitability in cold weather environments.

JP-8 is formulated with an icing inhibitor, corrosion inhibitor–lubricants, and antistatic agents, and contains less benzene (a carcinogen) and n-hexane (a neurotoxin) than JP-4. However, it also smells stronger than JP-4. JP-8 has an oily feel to the touch, while JP-4 feels more like a solvent.

The United States Navy uses a similar formula, JP-5. JP-5 has an even higher flash point of > 140 °F (60 °C), but also a higher cost. The U.S. Navy Seabees use JP-8 in construction and tactical equipment.

=== Single-fuel concept ===
JP-8 was specified in 1990 by the U.S. government as a replacement for government diesel fueled vehicles. This is in the wider context of the 1986 NATO Single-Fuel Concept agreement, in which F-34 (JP-8) is to replace F-54 (diesel fuel) in land vehicles and F-40 (JP-4) in land-based turbine aircraft to simplify logistics. It is also used as coolant in engines and some other aircraft components.

Beyond use in vehicles from trucks to tanks to planes, JP-8 is used in U.S. Army heaters and stoves.

== Problems ==
=== Diesel problems ===
When used in highly turbocharged diesel engines with the corresponding lower compression ratio (e.g. 14:1 or lower), JP-8 causes troubles during cold start and idling due to lower compression temperatures and the subsequent ignition delay because the cetane index is not specified in MIL-DTL-83133G to 40 or higher. Because lubricity by the BOCLE method is not specified in MIL-DTL-83133G, modern common-rail diesel engines can experience wear problems in high-pressure fuel pumps and injectors.

Another problem in diesel engines can be increased wear to exhaust valve seats in the cylinder heads, because a maximum sulfur content is not specified in MIL-DTL-83133G. Sulfur in fuel normally contributes to a build-up of soot layers on these valve seats. According to the notes of this standard, it is intended to include a cetane index value in one of the next releases. MIL-DTL-83133J sets the maximum sulfur content at 0.30%. It however only requires a cetane number of 40 after addition of FT-SPK (synthetic jet fuel).

The use of jet fuel in diesel engines has caused some minor issues, none of which were discovered in the Fort Bliss test with JP-8. During Desert Shield and Desert Storm, commercial Jet A1 was used as the only fuel and failed in engines with Stanadyne fuel-injection pumps missing an elastomer insert retrofit. Other than that, JP-8 slightly reduces torque and fuel economy due to its lower density and viscosity compared to diesel fuel. Engine modification can offset this issue.

=== Health concerns ===
Workers have complained of smelling and tasting JP-8 for hours after exposure. As JP-8 is less volatile than standard diesel fuel, it remains on the contaminated surfaces for a longer time, increasing the risk of exposure.

In 2001, Texas Tech University's Institute of Environmental and Human Health and the United States Air Force conducted an 18-month study of the health effects of JP-8 on 339 active duty personnel at six US Air Force installations. The study found that Air Force workers who were exposed to JP-8 were no more likely to seek medical attention than workers who were not exposed to JP-8 on the job.

== Variants ==
JP-8+100 (F-37) is a variant of JP-8 augmented with the additive Spec-Aid 8Q462, also known as Aeroshell Performance Additive 101, created by BetzDearborn (now GE Betz). The additive increases the thermal stability of JP-8 by 100°F (56°C), hence the designation "+100". Spec-Aid 8Q462 was introduced in 1994 to reduce choking and fouling in engine fuel systems and is a combination of a surfactant, metal deactivator, and an antioxidant. It is added to JP-8 at a ratio of 256 ppm to create JP-8+100, at an added cost of $5 per 1000 gallons of fuel. Commercially, this additive is used in police helicopters in Tampa, Florida. JP-8+100 is also used for Canadian Forces CP-140 Aurora, CC-130 Hercules, CF-18 Hornet and the CC-115 Buffalo.

F-35 is a variant without icing inhibitor. The only required additive is a static dissipater.

JP-8+100LT is a variant of JP-8+100, with additives to facilitate low-temperature performance. It is considered as a logistically friendly low-cost replacement of the JPTS fuel for the Lockheed U-2 airplane.

F-24 is commercial Jet A fuel (ASTM D1655) with the additive package required for JP-8 (SDA, CI/LI, FSII) added by the military. The intention is to lower costs by using commercially available fuel. The resulting fuel has identical properties to JP-8, save for a higher freezing-point specification. The U.S. military switched to F-24 in domestic (excluding Alaska) sites in 2012. In 2018, it was found that the F-24 mixture could deteriorate during transport causing much reduced thermal stability, but addition of the +100 (8Q462) additive was enough to salvage degraded fuel.

F-27 is F-24 with the +100 additive package.

JP-8+225 is a planned variant of JP-8 that increases thermal stability by 225 °F (125 °C). Such a fuel would match the thermal stability of JP-7 and become a lower-cost replacement should it exist.

== See also ==
- Aviation fuel
- JP-6
- JP-7
- JP-10
- JPTS
