= Laurylamine dipropylenediamine =

Names
- IUPAC name N'-(3-aminopropyl)-N'-dodecylpropane-1,3-diamine
- Other names: Bis(aminopropyl)laurylamine; Bis(3-aminopropyl)(dodecyl)amine; Dodecyl Dipropylenetriamine

Identifiers
CAS Number	2372-82-9
3D model (JSmol)	Interactive image
ChemSpider	67940
ECHA InfoCard	100.017.406
EC Number	219-145-8
PubChem CID	75407
UNII	PCJ6308JUE
CompTox Dashboard (EPA)	DTXSID3041243
- InChI: Key: NYNKJVPRTLBJNQ-UHFFFAOYSA-N; InChI=1S/C18H41N3/c1-2-3-4-5-6-7-8-9-10-11-16-21(17-12-14-19)18-13-15-20/h2-20H2,1H3
- SMILES: CCCCCCCCCCCCN(CCCN)CCCN

Properties
Chemical formula	C_{18}H_{41}N_{3}
Molar mass	299.5
Density	0.865 g/mL
Melting point	9 °C (48 °F; 282 K)
Boiling point	182–184 °C (360–363 °F; 455–457 K)

Hazards
- GHS labelling
Pictograms	(GHS05: Corrosive) (GHS06: Toxic) (GHS07: Exclamation mark) (GHS09: Environmental hazard)
Signal word	Danger
Hazard statements	H301, H314, H373, H410
Precautionary statements	P260, P264, P264+P265, P270, P273, P280, P301+P316, P301+P330+P331, P302+P361+P354, P304+P340, P305+P354+P338, P316, P317, P319, P321, P330, P363, P391, P405, P501
- Except where otherwise noted, data are given for materials in their standard state (at 25 °C [77 °F], 100 kPa). Infobox references

Laurylamine Dipropylenediamine (DPTA) is an organic compound in the class of dodecylamines. It is a colourless liquid although commercial samples can appear yellow and exhibit an amine-like odour.

DPTA is a widely applied ingredient in many products, such as in surfactants, antimicrobials, preservatives, emulsifiers, corrosion inhibitors, chilling liquids, antistatics (e.g., in hair products), and dispersing agents.

In 2022, the EU decided upon not approving DPTA as an existing active substance for use in biocidal products of product-type 8, wood preservatives, due to the unacceptable risks for human health, and not having suitable risk mitigation measures.
