= Polydicyclopentadiene =

- Linear form

Names
- Other names Poly(dicyclopentadiene); PDCPD

Identifiers
CAS Number	1393670-91-1

Properties
Chemical formula	(C_{10}H_{12})_{n}
Molar mass	Variable
Density	0.980-1.20 g/cm^{3}
- Except where otherwise noted, data are given for materials in their standard state (at 25 °C [77 °F], 100 kPa). Infobox references

Polydicyclopentadiene (PDCPD) is a polymer material which is formed through ring-opening metathesis polymerization (ROMP) of dicyclopentadiene (DCPD). PDCPD exhibits high crosslinking, which grants its properties, such as high impact resistance, good chemical corrosion resistance, and high heat deflection temperature. PDCPD is frequently used in the automotive industry to make body panels, bumpers, and other components for trucks, buses, tractors, and construction equipment. PDCPD is being investigated for the creation of porous materials for tissue engineering or gas storage applications, as well as for self-healing polymers.

Polymerization can be achieved through the use of different transition metal catalysts as ruthenium, molybdenum, tungsten, and titanium, as well as under metal-free conditions through photoredox catalysis. The exact structure of the PDCPD polymer depends upon the reaction conditions used for the polymerization. While the crosslinked polymer may arise from the metathesis of both alkenes in the parent monomer, it has been suggested that much polymerization conditions result in only the strained norbornene ring in the monomer undergoing olefin metathesis while subsequent crosslinking steps result from thermal condensation of the remaining olefins in the linear polymer. Several new catalytic systems for the synthesis of linear PDCPD have been run successfully using tungsten hexachloride, tungsten(VI) oxytetrachloride, and organosilicon compounds.

== Chemical process ==
The reacting system is formulated to maximize the speed of the reaction, and in this system, two components must be mixed in a ration of equal volume. Both components contain mainly DCPD with some additional additives. The catalyst system is divided into two parts, each part going into a separate component. When both components are mixed, the complete catalyst system is recombined and becomes active. This is an important difference from other reaction injection molding (RIM) systems, such as polyurethane, since the reaction is not stoichiometric. The 1:1 volume ratio for DCPD molding is not critical since this is not a combination of two different chemical elements to form a specific matrix. However, significant changes in ratio will slow down the system's reactivity because fewer active reaction nuclei are being formed.

== Equipment ==
DCPD resins are transformed using high pressure RIM equipment as used in the polyurethane industry, with some small changes to be considered. The most important change is that the resin can never be in contact with air or moisture, which requires a nitrogen blanket in the tanks. The tools or molds are closed tools and are being clamped using a hydraulic press. Because the resins shrink approximately 6% in volume during reaction, these presses (also called clamping units) do not have to handle high pressures, such as for sheet molding compound (SMC) or expanding polyurethane.

== Tooling ==
Most tooling for PDCPD is made from aluminium. Flat parts can be made from machined aluminum while deeper 3D-shaped parts are often made as cast aluminium tools. It is important to take volumetric shrinkage into account, and gaskets must be used around all cavities.

== Process considerations ==
The liquid resin has a relative density of 0.97 and reacts into a solid with a relative density of 1.03, which makes up a volumetric shrinkage of 6%. Since most parts are panels, most of the shrinkage will happen on the Z-axis — causing a change in thickness. This makes the parts self-demolding as they do not have a good contact with the core side (which is the back side) of the tool.

A reacting system is always governed by temperature - in any form. This means that the temperature of the liquid components has a strong influence on the reactivity. To ensure that one side has the required surface finish, the temperature on that side needs to be higher than on the core side. Both tool-halves are therefore tempered at a different temperature with typical values of 60 °C and 80 °C.

Typical cycle times for molding parts range between 4 and 6 minutes.

== Properties ==
PDCPD has several useful properties:

- high impact resistance
- high chemical corrosion resistance
- high heat deflection temperature (HDT)

PDCPD does not contain any fiber reinforcement, although a fiber reinforced version has been in development. PDCPD allows the thickness to vary throughout a part, to incorporate ribs, and to overmold inserts for an uncomplicated assembly of the parts. PDCPD cannot be painted in mass and needs to be painted after molding.

== Applications ==
Since PDCPD is still a new material, the number of applications is quite limited. The major applications is in body panels, mainly for tractors, construction equipment, trucks and buses. In the industrial applications, the main usage is components for chlor-alkali production (e.g. cell covers for electrolyzers). It is used in other applications where impact resistance in combination with rigidity, 3D design and/or corrosion resistance are required.

== Recycling ==
PDCPD is not recyclable. In July 2020, researchers reported the development of a technique to produce a degradable version of this tough thermoset plastic, which may also apply to other plastics, that are not included among the 75% of plastics that are recyclable.
