= Amorphothecaceae =

Scientific classification
- Kingdom: Fungi
- Division: Ascomycota
- Class: incertae sedis
- Order: incertae sedis
- Family: Amorphothecaceae; Parbery (1969)

Type genus
- Amorphotheca Parbery (1969)

Family of fungi

The Amorphothecaceae are a family of fungi in the division Ascomycota. This family can not yet be taxonomically classified in any of the ascomycetous classes and orders with any degree of certainty (incertae sedis). It contains the single genus Amorphotheca.

In nature, Amorphothecaceae exist under Taxus trees. The only known species within this family, Amorphotheca resinae (also known as Hormoconis resinae or Cladosporium resinae), can live in tanks of diesel or jet fuel, consuming alkanes and traces of water, which can cause problems for airliners and boats.

== See also ==
- List of Ascomycota families incertae sedis
