= JPTS =

Jet Propellant Thermally Stable (JPTS) is a jet fuel originally developed in 1956 for the Lockheed U-2 reconnaissance aircraft.

== History ==
Because of tight security restrictions enforced during the U-2's development, batches of fuel that were delivered to the aircraft's engine manufacturer were initially labeled LF-1.

In 1956, a year after the U-2's first flight, a USAF Captain assigned to the Fuels Branch was instructed to buy a tank car load of LF-1 and have it shipped to an engine manufacturer. Not knowing what LF-1 was, he obtained a sample, had it analyzed, and determined that it was paraffinic kerosene, a fluid commonly known as charcoal lighter fluid (hence LF-1).

Specification MIL-T-25524 was later written to include an additive for improving JPTS' thermal oxidative stability.

== Properties ==
JPTS has a flash point of 43 °C (110 °F), a freezing point of -53 °C (-64 °F) and flammability limits of 1 and 6 %. It has an appearance of a water-white clear liquid with specific gravity of 0.816. It is insoluble in water. It is composed of a complex mixture of petroleum hydrocarbons.

JPTS has a lower freeze point, lower viscosity, and higher thermal stability than standard aviation fuels. The fuel's low viscosity is needed to overcome the risk of it freezing in the low temperatures encountered during flight at high altitudes. JPTS also serves as coolant of engines and aerodynamically heated surfaces.

As the fuel flow to the U-2's engines at cruise altitudes is about sixteen times lower than at sea level, the dwell time over hot surfaces is longer and increases the chances of thermal breakdown; JPTS's high thermal stability is therefore desired to avoid coking and deposition of varnishes in the piping.

JPTS is a specialty fuel and is produced by only two oil refineries in the United States. As such, it has limited worldwide availability and costs over three times the per-gallon price of the Air Force's primary jet fuel, JP-8. Research is under way to find a cheaper and easier alternative involving additives to generally used jet fuels. A JP-8 based alternative, JP-8+100LT, is being considered. JP-8+100 has increased thermal stability by 100 degrees F more than stock JP8, and is only 0.5 cents per gallon more expensive; low temperature additives can be blended to this stock to add the desired cold performance.

== See also ==
- JP-4
- JP-6
- JP-7
- JP-8
- Aviation fuel
