= Dicyclopentadiene =

- Stereo wireframe model of dicyclopentadiene. endo‑Dicyclopentadiene (left) exo‑Dicyclopentadiene (right)

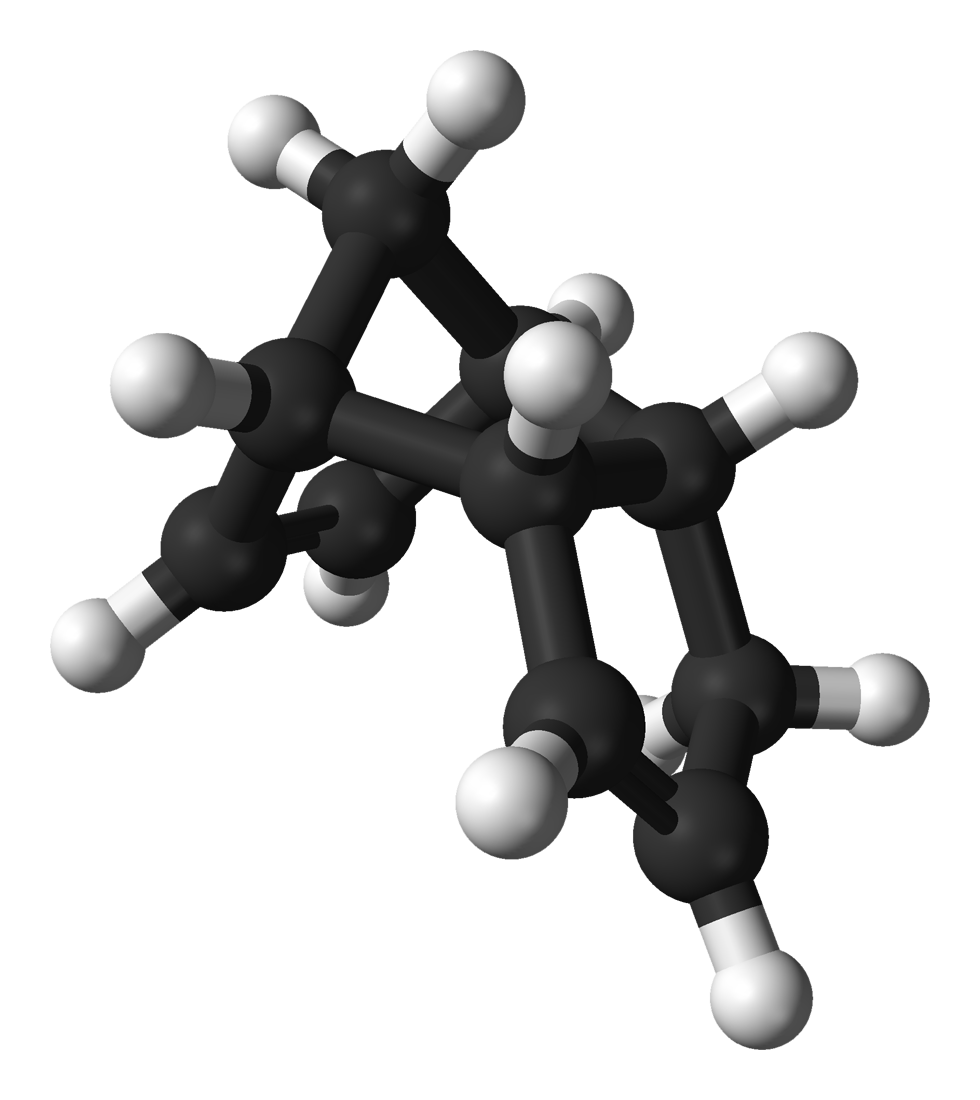
- Ball and stick model of dicyclopentadiene Ball-and-stick model of endo‑Dicyclopentadiene

Names
- IUPAC name Tricyclo[5.2.1.0^{2,6}]deca-3,8-diene
- Other names 1,3-Dicyclopentadiene, Bicyclopentadiene, 3a,4,7,7a-Tetrahydro-1H-4,7-methanoindene: endo isomer: (3aR*,4S*,7R*,7aS*)-; exo isomer: (3aS*,4S*,7R*,7aR*)-

Identifiers
CAS Number	1755-01-7 (endo- form); 77-73-6 (non-specific); 933-60-8 (exo- form)
3D model (JSmol)	Interactive image
Abbreviations	DCPD
Beilstein Reference	1904092
ChemSpider	6247; 24532442 (^{2}H_{12}); 4933978 (6R); 8572323 (1S,7R)
ECHA InfoCard	100.000.958
EC Number	201-052-9
KEGG	C14411
MeSH	Dicyclopentadiene
PubChem CID	6492; 6428576 (6R); 10396885 (1S,7R)
RTECS number	PC1050000
UNII	88Z4HUV8LI
UN number	UN 2048
CompTox Dashboard (EPA)	DTXSID5025023
- InChI: InChI=1S/C10H12/c1-2-9-7-4-5-8(6-7)10(9)3-1/h1-2,4-5,7-10H,3,6H2 Key: HECLRDQVFMWTQS-UHFFFAOYSA-N; InChI=1/C10H12/c1-2-9-7-4-5-8(6-7)10(9)3-1/h1-2,4-5,7-10H,3,6H2 Key: HECLRDQVFMWTQS-UHFFFAOYAO
- SMILES: C1C=CC2C1C3CC2C=C3

Properties
Chemical formula	C_{10}H_{12}
Molar mass	132.20 g/mol
Appearance	Colorless, crystalline solid
Odor	camphor-like
Density	0.978 g/cm^{3}
Melting point	32.5 °C (90.5 °F; 305.6 K)
Boiling point	170 °C (338 °F; 443 K)
Solubility in water	0.02%
Solubility	very soluble in ethyl ether, ethanol soluble in acetone, dichloromethane, ethyl acetate, n-hexane, toluene
log P	2.78
Vapor pressure	180 Pa (20 °C)

Hazards
NFPA 704 (fire diamond)	1 3 1
Flash point	32 °C (90 °F; 305 K)
Autoignition temperature	503 °C (937 °F; 776 K)
Explosive limits	0.8–6.3%
- NIOSH (US health exposure limits)
PEL (Permissible)	none
REL (Recommended)	TWA 5 ppm (30 mg/m^{3})
IDLH (Immediate danger)	N.D.
- Except where otherwise noted, data are given for materials in their standard state (at 25 °C [77 °F], 100 kPa). verify (what is ?) Infobox references

Dicyclopentadiene, abbreviated DCPD, is a chemical compound with formula C_{10}H_{12}. At room temperature, it is a white brittle wax, although lower purity samples can be straw coloured liquids. The pure material smells somewhat of soy wax or camphor, with less pure samples possessing a stronger acrid odor. Its energy density is 10,975 Wh/l. Dicyclopentadiene is a co-produced in large quantities in the steam cracking of naphtha and gas oils to ethylene. The major use is in resins, particularly, unsaturated polyester resins. It is also used in inks, adhesives, and paints.

The top seven suppliers worldwide together had an annual capacity in 2001 of 179 kilotonnes (395 million pounds).

== History and structure ==
DCPD was discovered in 1885 as a C_{10}H_{12} hydrocarbon among the products of pyrolysis of phenol by Henry Roscoe. Roscoe accurately assumed that it was a dimer of some C_{5}H_{6} hydrocarbon; the monomer was identified in the next decade.

For many years the structure of dicyclopentadiene was thought to feature a cyclobutane ring as the fusion between the two subunits. Through the efforts of Alder and coworker, the structure was deduced in 1931.

The spontaneous dimerization of neat cyclopentadiene at room temperature to form dicyclopentadiene proceeds to around 50% conversion over 24 hours and yields the endo isomer in better than 99:1 ratio as the kinetically favored product (about 150:1 endo:exo at 80 °C). However, prolonged heating results in isomerization to the exo isomer. The pure exo isomer was first prepared by base-mediated elimination of hydroiodo-exo-dicyclopentadiene. Thermodynamically, the exo isomer is about 0.7 kcal/mol more stable than the endo isomer. The exo isomer also has a lower reported melting point of 19°C. Both isomers are chiral.

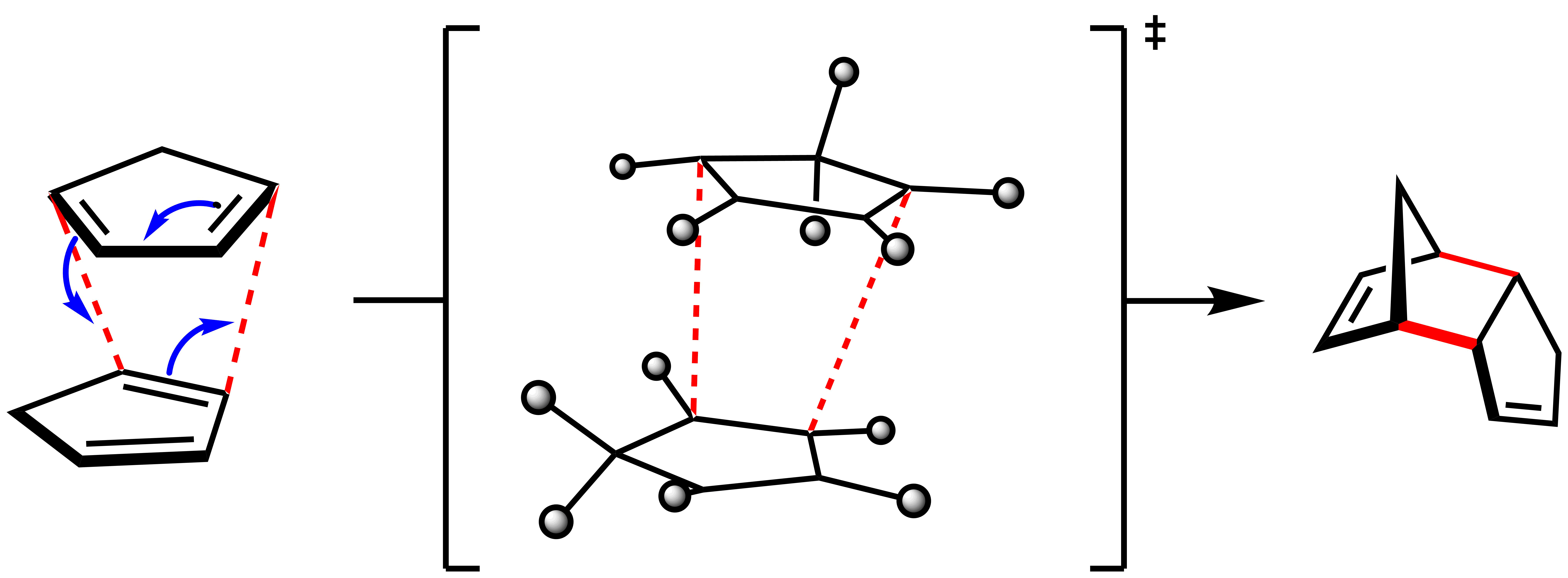

== Reactions ==
Above 150 °C, dicyclopentadiene undergoes a retro-Diels–Alder reaction at an appreciable rate to yield cyclopentadiene. The reaction is reversible and at room temperature cyclopentadiene dimerizes over the course of hours to re-form dicyclopentadiene. Cyclopentadiene is a useful diene in Diels–Alder reactions as well as a precursor to metallocenes in organometallic chemistry. It is not available commercially as the monomer, due to the rapid formation of dicyclopentadiene; hence, it must be prepared by "cracking" the dicyclopentadiene (heating the dimer and isolating the monomer by distillation) shortly before it is needed.

The thermodynamic parameters of this process have been measured. At temperatures above about 125 °C in the vapor phase, dissociation to cyclopentadiene monomer starts to become thermodynamically favored (the dissociation constant K_{d} = [cyclopentadiene]^{2} / [dicyclopentadiene] > 1). For instance, the values of K_{d} at 149 °C and 195 °C were found to be 277 and 2200, respectively. By extrapolation, K_{d} is on the order of 10^{–4} at 25 °C, and dissociation is disfavored. In accord with the negative values of ΔH° and ΔS° for the Diels–Alder reaction, dissociation of dicyclopentadiene is more thermodynamically favorable at high temperatures. Equilibrium constant measurements imply that ΔH° = –18 kcal/mol and ΔS° = –40 eu for cyclopentadiene dimerization.

Dicyclopentadiene polymerizes. Copolymers are formed with ethylene or styrene. The "norbornene double bond" participates. Using ring-opening metathesis polymerization a homopolymer polydicyclopentadiene is formed.

Hydroformylation of DCP gives the dialdehyde called TCD dialdehyde (TCD = tricyclodecane). This dialdehyde can be oxidized to the dicarboxylic acid and to a diol. All of these derivatives have some use in polymer science.

Hydrogenation of dicyclopentadiene gives tetrahydrodicyclopentadiene (C_{10}H_{16}), which is a component of jet fuel JP-10, and rearranges to adamantane with aluminium chloride or acid at elevated temperature.

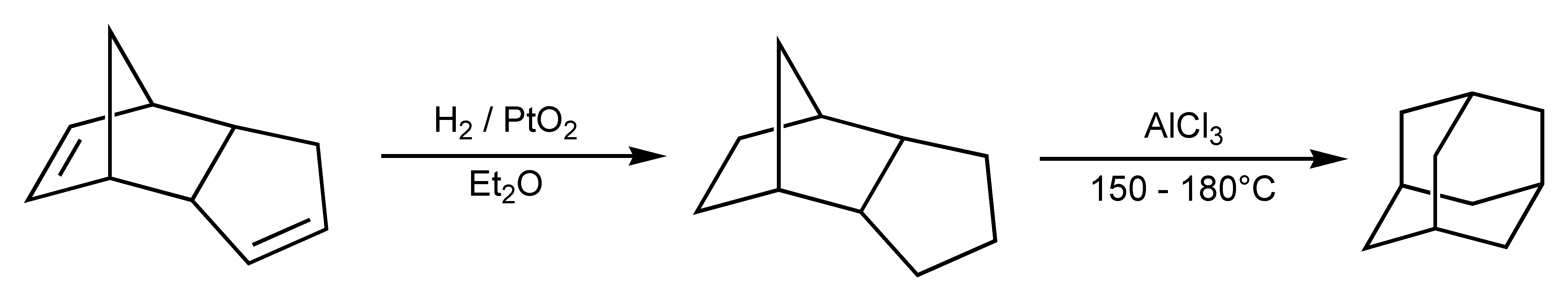
