= Amorphotheca resinae =

Scientific classification
- Kingdom: Fungi
- Division: Ascomycota
- Class: incertae sedis
- Order: incertae sedis
- Family: Amorphothecaceae
- Genus: Amorphotheca
- Species: A. resinae

Binomial name
- Amorphotheca resinae (Lindau) Parbery

Synonyms
- Cladosporium resinae (Lindau) G.A. de Vries; Hormoconis resinae (Lindau) Arx & G.A. de Vries

Species of fungus

Amorphotheca resinae is an ascomycete fungus of the family Amorphothecaceae which is known to thrive in environments containing alkanes (and water), like aviation fuel, from which it derives its trivial name 'kerosene fungus'. As such it belongs to the heterogenous group of microbial contaminants of diesel fuel.

== See also ==
- Ascomycota#Metabolism
- Fuel polishing
- Yamadazyma keroseneae
