= Fuel polishing =

Cleaning process of stored oil and hydrocarbon fuel

Fuel polishing is the technical cleaning process used to remove or filter microbial contamination from oil and hydrocarbon fuel in storage. It is essentially a recirculation of fuel involving the removal of water, sediment and microbial contamination from such fuels as gasoline, diesel, red diesel and biodiesel. This fuel contamination, also known as 'fuel bugs', or 'diesel bugs', or 'so-called algae' build up over time in stored fuels if they aren't tested and treated on a regular basis. To comply with fuel standards, a fine filter of 4 micron absolute or finer should be used. To ensure bacteria contamination is dealt with, mechanical separation of sludge and water is essential. Indeed ideally both free and emulsified water should be extracted from the fuel flow. A fuel polishing system should be self pumping, and self monitoring, with automatic switch off on any alarm state to avoid contaminated fuel being passed back to the tank.

Fuel analysis should be undertaken before fuel polishing is commenced so that the exact contamination problem can be rectified with a targeted solution. A second fuel test should be performed after the fuel polishing has been completed to confirm the problem has been fixed.

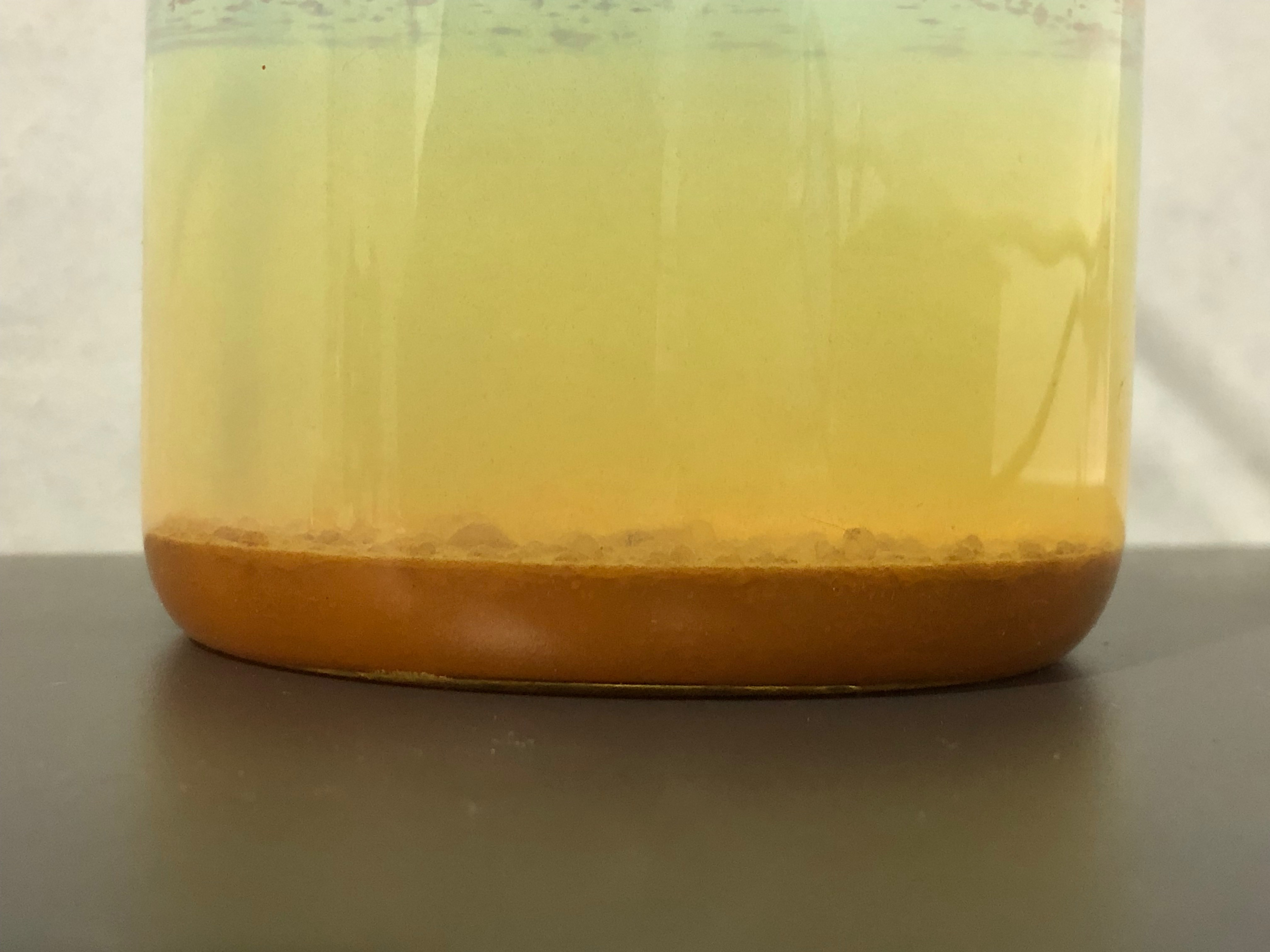

== Sources of contamination ==
- Water
  - Dissolved Water
  - Emulsified Water
  - Free Water
- Microbial Growth (AKA Diesel Bug)
  - Bacteria
  - Yeast
  - Mold
  - Bio-films
- Solid Particle Contamination
  - Rust
  - Dirt
  - Gums
  - Wax
  - Soot
  - Organic Compounds

Any and all of these contaminants will eventually lead to break downs or engine failure.

These types of contamination can be introduced from many different sources throughout the supply chain of the diesel fuel as well as within the storage tank itself. Any one of these contaminants can cause complete engine failure.

In April 2010, Cathay Pacific Flight 780, an aircraft carrying over 300 passengers, had a close call when fuel contaminated with spherical particles damaged the aircraft's engines, resulting in 57 passenger injuries as the pilots had to land the aircraft at twice the normal landing speed.

== Symptoms of 'diesel bugs' ==
The symptoms of diesel bugs are easy to find. Important things to check over and look out for are:

- Blocked Filters
- Fuel System Failure
- Worn Fuel Injectors
- Corroded Tanks
- Engine Failure

Microbial contamination is significantly accelerated when higher biodiesel content occurs along with lower sulphur content.

== Water in oil ==
Almost everything on Earth contains elements of water; oil and fuel are no exceptions. While very small amounts exist in fuels to start with, stored fuel will become a breeding ground for the microbial bacteria and over time, the levels of damage change from dissolved to emulsified and finally free.

- Dissolved - Dissolved water in oil is the presence of water but, unnoticeable to the eye. The water continues to develop until saturation point where water visibility begins.
- Emulsified - At the point of saturation, a cloudy appearance will be the tell-tale sign that the water/oil mixture has become emulsified.
- Free - The most developed stage of fuel contamination is when free-flowing puddles of water appear within stored oil. At this point, bacterial contamination and growth is boosted.

== Microbial contamination ==
The contaminants found in fuel can be made up of a number of organisms, predominantly Hormoconis resinae, which is typically the main contaminant when microbial contamination is present, along with bacteria Pseudomonas aeruginosa, and fungi such as yeasts and moulds like Yarrowia tropicalis.

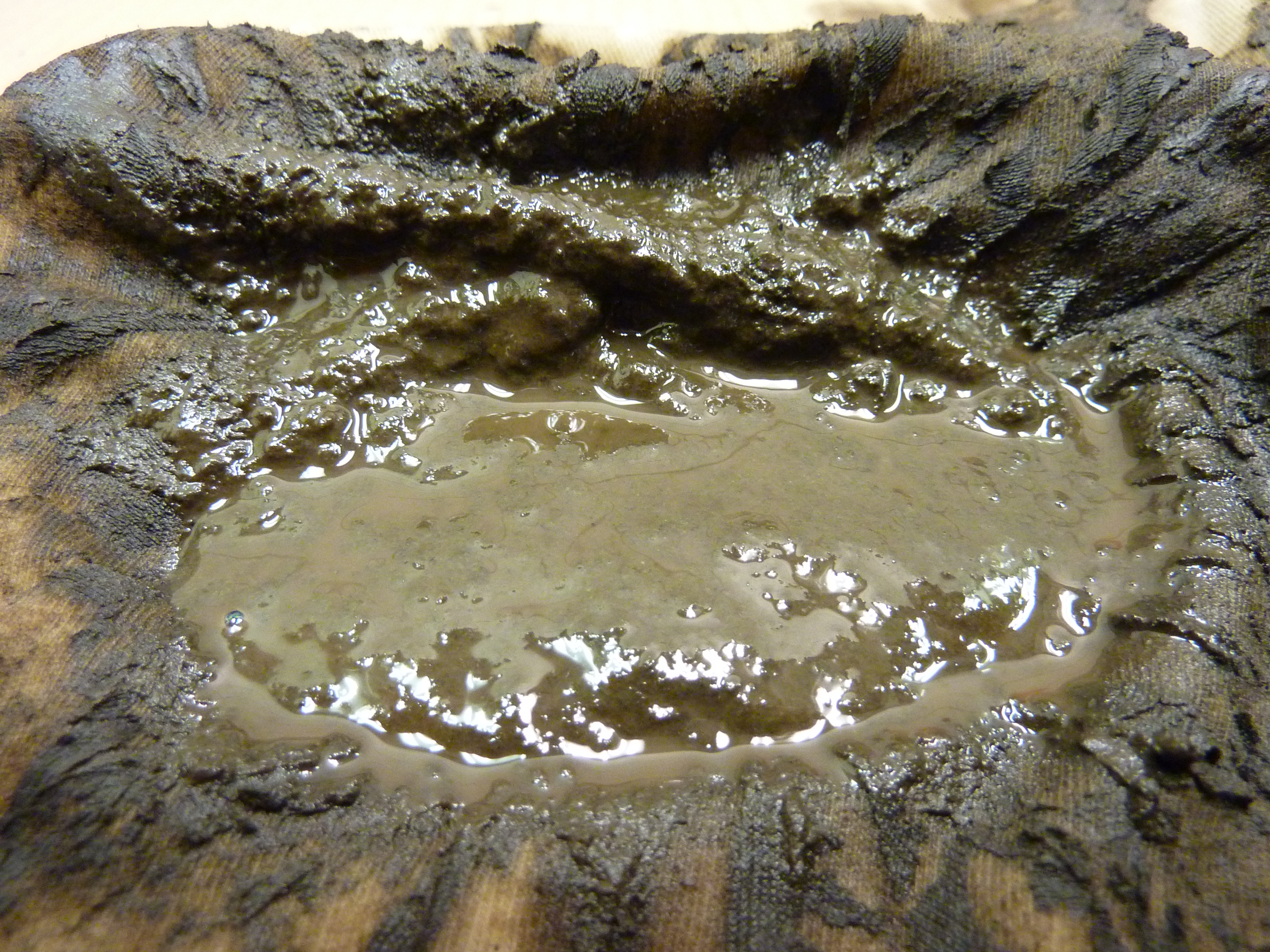
Diesel bug (microbial infections) can and often has the appearance of sludge. To the layman this could simply be dirt and sand, but is in fact a living organism. This sample was incubated over three months in a 1-litre jar of clean diesel.

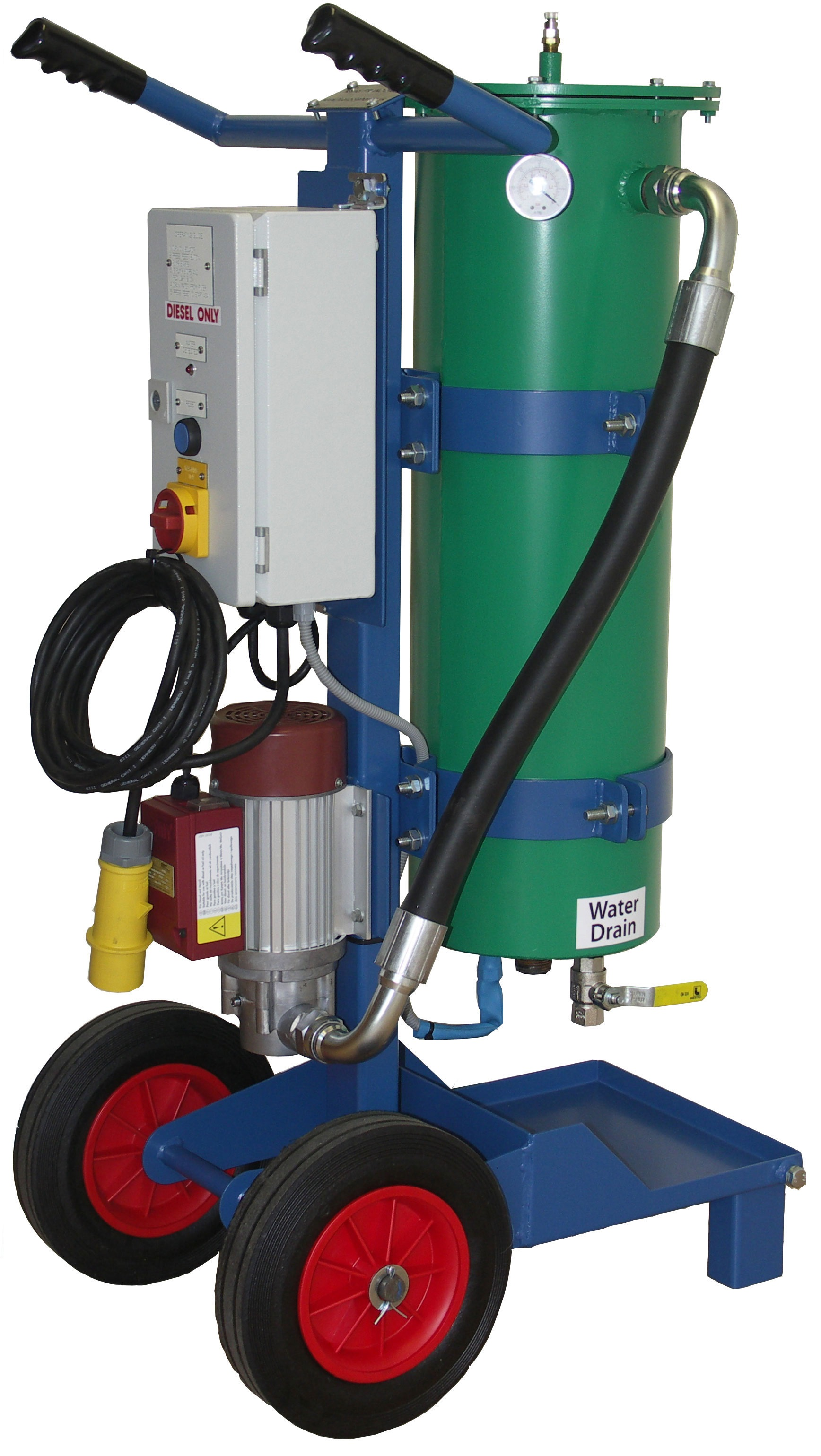
Mobile Fuel Polisher 50 litres per minute & 5 micron filtration

== See also ==
- Particle counter
