= Fuel system icing inhibitor =

Additive to aviation fuels

Fuel system icing inhibitor (FSII) is an additive to aviation fuels that prevents the formation of ice in fuel lines. FSII is sometimes referred to by the registered, genericized trademark Prist. Jet fuel can contain a small amount of dissolved water that does not appear in droplet form. As an aircraft gains altitude, the temperature drops and the fuel's capacity to hold water is diminished. Dissolved water can separate out and could become a serious problem if it freezes in fuel lines or filters, blocking the flow of fuel and shutting down an engine.

== Chemical composition ==
Chemically, FSII is an almost pure (99.9%) ethylene glycol monomethyl ether (EGMME, 2-methoxy ethanol, APISOLVE 76, CAS number 109-86-4); or since 1994, diethylene glycol monomethyl ether (DEGMME, 2-(2-methoxy ethoxy) ethanol, APITOL 120, methyl carbitol, CAS number 111-77-3).

Prior to 1994, Prist was regulated under the MIL-I-27686E standard, which specified use of EGMME, but subsequently came under the MIL-DTL-85470B, with use of less hazardous DEGMME with higher flash point.

FSII was thought to retard the growth of microorganisms eventually present in the fuel, mostly Cladosporium resinae fungi and Pseudomonas aeruginosa bacteria, known as "hydrocarbon utilizing microorganisms" or "HUM bugs", which live in the water-fuel interface of the water droplets, form dark, gel-like mats, and cause microbial corrosion to plastic and rubber parts, but this has since been removed from labelling.

EGMME had been certified as a pesticide by the EPA, but as the requirement changes raised the certification costs, DEGMME has no official pesticide certification. DEGMME is a potent solvent, and at high concentrations can damage fuel bladders and filters. Long-term storage of FSII-fuel mixtures is therefore not recommended.

Anhydrous isopropyl alcohol is sometimes used as an alternative.

== Purpose ==
FSII is an agent that is mixed with jet fuel as it is pumped into the aircraft. The mixture of FSII must be between 0.10% and 0.15% by volume for the additive to work correctly, and the FSII must be distributed evenly throughout the fuel. Simply adding FSII after the fuel has been pumped is therefore not sufficient. As aircraft climbs after takeoff, the temperature drops, and any dissolved water will separate out from the fuel. FSII dissolves itself in water preferentially over the jet fuel, where it then serves to depress the freezing point of water to -43 °C. Since the freezing point of jet fuel itself is usually in this region, the formation of ice is now a minimal concern.

Large aircraft do not require FSII as they are usually equipped with electric fuel line heaters or fuel/oil intercoolers that keep the fuel at an appropriate temperature to prevent icing. However, if the fuel heaters are inoperable, the aircraft may be still be declared fit to fly, if FSII is added to the fuel.

== Storage and dispensing ==
It is extremely important to store FSII properly. Drums containing FSII must be kept clean and dry, since the additive is hygroscopic and can absorb water directly from moisture in the air. Since some brands of FSII are highly toxic, a crew member must wear gloves when handling it undiluted. Many FBOs allow FSII injection to be turned on or off so that one fuel truck can service planes that do require FSII as well as planes that don't. Line crew, however, must be able to deliver FSII when it is needed.
