= Yamadazyma =

Scientific classification
- Kingdom: Fungi
- Division: Ascomycota
- Class: Saccharomycetes
- Order: Saccharomycetales
- Family: Debaryomycetaceae
- Genus: Yamadazyma; Billon-Grand

Type species
- Yamadazyma philogaea (Van der Walt & Johannsen) Billon-Grand

Genus of fungi

Yamadazyma is a genus of fungi within the family Debaryomycetaceae of the order Saccharomycetales.

== Species ==
- Yamadazyma acaciae
- Yamadazyma castillae
- Yamadazyma farinosum
- Yamadazyma guilliermondii
- Yamadazyma haplophilum
- Yamadazyma inositovora
- Yamadazyma medium
- Yamadazyma mexicanum
- Yamadazyma nakazawae
- Yamadazyma philogaea
- Yamadazyma scolyti
- Yamadazyma segobiense
- Yamadazyma spartinae
- Yamadazyma stipite
- Yamadazyma keroseneae
