= Alkyl phosphate =

Group of chemical compounds

Alkyl phosphates belong to a group of organic compounds called organophosphates. They are esters of phosphoric acid H_{3}PO_{4} and corresponding alcohol. For example, the formula of methyl phosphate is CH_{3}-H_{2}PO_{4}, dimethyl phosphate – (CH_{3})_{2}HPO_{4} and trimethyl phosphate – (CH_{3})_{3}PO_{4}.

Alkyl phosphates are widely distributed in nature, and form the basis of most biological processes. For example, high energy metabolites such as ATP and PEP are alkyl phosphates, as are nucleic acids such as DNA and RNA. Alkyl phosphates are also important medicinally, for example the HIV drug AZT is inactive until it becomes an alkyl phosphate in vivo.

== Dialkyl phosphate ==
In dialkyl phosphates, two of the hydrogens in phosphoric acid are replaced by alkyl groups, e.g. dimethyl phosphate – (CH_{3})_{2}HPO_{4}

=== Agricultural use ===
Dialkyl phosphates or dialkyl phosphate esters are used in many agricultural chemicals. Levels in the urine have been used as a method of trying to determine levels of exposure to organophosphates; however, it is unclear how well they do this.

=== Health effects ===
Exposure to dialkyl phosphate during pregnancy appears to increase the risk of ADHD.

== Trialkyl phosphate ==
In trialkyl phosphates, all three hydrogens in phosphoric acid are replaced by alkyl groups, e.g. trimethyl phosphate – (CH_{3})_{3}PO_{4}.
