= JP-10 (fuel) =

Jet fuel

JP-10 (Jet Propellant 10) is a synthetic jet fuel, specified and used mainly as fuel in missiles. Being designed for military purposes, it is not a kerosene based fuel.

Developed to be a gas turbine fuel for cruise missiles, it contains mainly exo-tetrahydrodicyclopentadiene (exo-THDCPD) with some endo-isomer impurity. About 100 ppm of alkylphenol-based antioxidant is added to prevent gumming. Optionally, 0.10–0.15% of fuel system icing inhibitor may be added. Exo-THDCPD is produced by catalytic hydrogenation of dicyclopentadiene and then isomerization.

It superseded JP-9, which is a mixture of norbornadiene-based RJ-5 fuel, tetrahydrodicyclopentadiene and methylcyclohexane, because of a lower temperature service limit and about four times lower price. Since the lack of volatile methylcyclohexane makes its ignition difficult, a separate priming fluid PF-1 with about 10-12% of this additive is required for the engine start-up. Its main use is in the Tomahawk missiles.

The Russian equivalent is called detsilin.

== Chemical properties of JP-10 fuel ==
- Chemical formula: C_{10}H_{16}
- H/C (Hydrogen/Carbon) ratio (mole): 1.6
- Average molecular weight (g/mol): 136.2
- LHV (lower heating value) (MJ/kg): 43.0

== Uses ==
JP-10 has a relatively high density of 940 kg/m^{3}. It has a low freezing point of less than −110 °C (−166 °F) and the flash point is 130 °F (54 °C). The high energy density of 39.6 MJ/L makes it ideal for military aerospace applications - its primary use. The ignition and burn chemistry has been extensively studied. The exo isomer also has a low freezing point. Its other properties have also been studied extensively.

Even though its uses are mainly for the military, the relatively high cost has meant research has been undertaken to find lower costs routes including the use of cellulosic materials.

== Scientific research ==
Current and past areas of research focus on:

- The pyrolysis and kinetics of the fuel.
- Catalytic addition of nanoparticles such as those based on cerium(IV) oxide.
- Catalysis for the endo to exo isomerisation.
- Use of additives in JP-10 for various enhancements.
