= Tricyclodecane =

endo
exo

Names
- IUPAC name tricyclo[5.2.1.0^{2,6}]decane
- Other names Tetrahydrodicyclopentadiene

Identifiers
CAS Number	6004-38-2
3D model (JSmol)	Interactive image
ChemSpider	16815
EC Number	227-851-2
PubChem CID	17795
CompTox Dashboard (EPA)	DTXSID60859773
- InChI: InChI=1S/C10H16/c1-2-9-7-4-5-8(6-7)10(9)3-1/h7-10H,1-6H2 Key: LPSXSORODABQKT-UHFFFAOYSA-N
- SMILES: C1CC2C3CCC(C3)C2C1

Properties
Chemical formula	C_{10}H_{16}
Molar mass	136.238 g·mol^{−1}

Hazards
- GHS labelling
Pictograms	(GHS02: Flammable) (GHS07: Exclamation mark) (GHS08: Health hazard)
Signal word	Danger
Hazard statements	H226, H302, H304, H315, H319, H335
Precautionary statements	P210, P233, P240, P241, P242, P243, P261, P264, P264+P265, P270, P271, P280, P301+P316, P301+P317, P302+P352, P303+P361+P353, P304+P340, P305+P351+P338, P319, P321, P330, P331, P332+P317, P337+P317, P362+P364, P370+P378, P403+P233, P403+P235, P405, P501

Related compounds
Related compounds	Twistane
- Except where otherwise noted, data are given for materials in their standard state (at 25 °C [77 °F], 100 kPa). Infobox references

Tricyclodecane (TCD) is an organic compound with the formula C_{10}H_{16}. It is classed as a hydrocarbon. It has two main stereoisomers–the endo and exo forms. Its primary use in the exo form is as a component of jet fuel. It is used here primarily because of its high energy density. The exo isomer also has a low freezing point. Because of this, its properties have been studied extensively. It is often called tetrahydrodicyclopentadiene.

== Reactions ==
Its reactions with other materials have been studied, as have various production methods. The two isomers can interconvert in the presence of aluminum chloride as catalyst absorbed on substrates such as silicon dioxide or zeolites, with preference for forming the exo as the major product.
