= Antistatic agent =

Compound used to reduce or eliminate buildup of static electricity

An antistatic agent is a compound used for treatment of materials or their surfaces in order to reduce or eliminate buildup of static electricity. Static charge may be generated by the triboelectric effect or by a non-contact process using a high voltage power source. Static charge may be introduced on a surface as part of an in-mold label printing process.

The role of an antistatic agent is to make the surface or the material itself slightly conductive, either by being conductive itself, or by absorbing moisture from the air; therefore, some humectants can be used. The molecules of an antistatic agent often have both hydrophilic and hydrophobic areas, similar to those of a surfactant; the hydrophobic side interacts with the surface of the material, while the hydrophilic side interacts with the air moisture and binds the water molecules.

Internal antistatic agents are designed to be mixed directly into the material, external antistatic agents are applied to the surface.

Common antistatic agents are based on long-chain aliphatic amines (optionally ethoxylated) and amides, quaternary ammonium salts (e.g., behentrimonium chloride or cocamidopropyl betaine), esters of phosphoric acid, polyethylene glycol esters, or polyols. Traditional migrating antistatic agents include long-chain alkyl phenols, ethoxylated amines, and glycerol esters, such as glycerol monostearate. Migrating antistatic agents offer cost-effective protection for short-term applications, but other applications need longer-term protection or the lower resistivity required to prevent sparks and protect electronics from electrostatic dissipation. These applications utilize permanent antistatic agents or conductive additives such as carbon black, conductive fibers, and nanomaterials. An antistatic agent for the treatment for coatings may also involve an ionic liquid or a solution of a salt in an ionic liquid. Indium tin oxide can be used as transparent antistatic coating of windows. It is also possible to use conductive polymers, like PEDOT:PSS and conducting polymer nanofibers, particularly polyaniline nanofibers. In general these systems are not very durable for coating, especially antimony tin oxide is used for durable systems, often in its nano form, it is then formulated to a final coating.

== Spinning and fibers ==
Fibers are often treated with dilute solutions of antistatic agents together with lubricants. Typical antistate agents are alkyl phosphates and phosphonates, various soaps, and ammonium salts.

== Fuels ==
Antistatic agents are also added to some military jet fuels, and to nonpolar organic solvents, to impart electrical conductivity, thus avoid buildup of static charge that could lead to sparks igniting fuel vapors. The static dissipator additive Stadis 450 is the agent added to some distillate fuels, commercial jet fuels, and to the military JP-8. "Stadis" is a trademarked brand, and Stadis 450 primarily consists of toluene, naphtha, dinonylnaphthylsulfonic acid, and propanol. Stadis 425 and Dorf Ketal's SR 1795 are similar compounds, for use in distillate fuels. Statsafe products are used in non-fuel applications. Antis DF3, similar to Stadis 425, is an amber-colored liquid composed of polyamine and polysulfone. Oil-soluble sulfonic acids, e.g. dodecylbenzenesulfonic acid, can be also used as part of some antistatic additives.

Antistatic agents can be added to nonpolar solvents to increase their conductivity to allow electrostatic spray painting. (Oxygenated solvents have too high conductivity to be used here.)

The polysulfones can be prepared by reacting olefins, notably alpha-olefins, with sulfur dioxide. The polyamines can be prepared by reacting epichlorohydrin with aliphatic monoamines.

== See also ==
- Antistatic device
