= Microbial contamination of diesel fuel =

Fuel problem

Water can get into diesel fuel as a result of condensation, rainwater penetration or adsorption from the air — biodiesel is especially hygroscopic. The presence of water then encourages microbial growth which either occurs at the interface between the oil and water or on the tank walls, depending on whether the microbes need oxygen.

Fuel companies state that untreated fuel will remain usable for only one year, after which fuel contamination ("the diesel bug") begins to appear. Most industrial engine manufacturers now recommend regular addition of additives to ensure the reliability of fuel.

Organisms which may grow in fuel include:

- Clostridium
- Desulfotomaculum
- Desulfovibrio
- Flavobacterium
- Acidovorax
- Pseudomonas
- Sarcina
- Aspergillus
- Yamadazyma
- Fusarium
- Amorphotheca
