= Jet fuel =

Type of aviation fuel

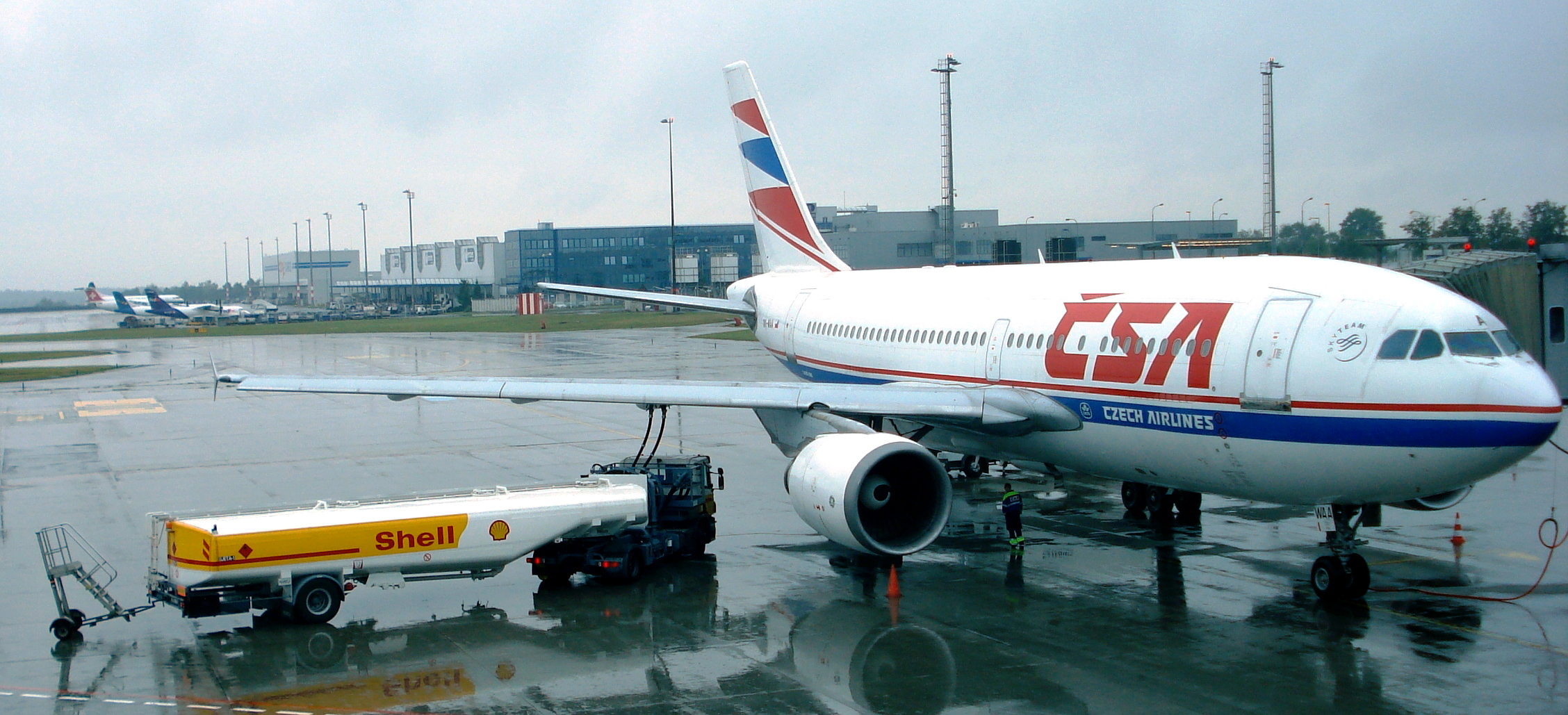
- An Airbus A310-300 of Czech Airlines being fueled at Prague Václav Havel Airport

Identifiers
CAS Number	8008-20-6 (kerosene, also called fuel oil no. 1); 64742-47-8 (Aviation Kerosene)
ChemSpider	None
UNII	1C89KKC04E
CompTox Dashboard (EPA)	DTXSID80109005

Properties
Appearance	Straw-colored liquid
Density	775-840 g/L
Melting point	−47 °C (−53 °F; 226 K)
Boiling point	176 °C (349 °F; 449 K)

Hazards
NFPA 704 (fire diamond)	2 2 0
Flash point	38 °C (100 °F; 311 K)
Autoignition temperature	210 °C (410 °F; 483 K)
- Safety data sheet (SDS)
- Except where otherwise noted, data are given for materials in their standard state (at 25 °C [77 °F], 100 kPa). verify (what is ?) Infobox references

Jet fuel or aviation turbine fuel (ATF, also abbreviated avtur) is a type of aviation fuel designed for use in aircraft powered by gas-turbine engines. It is colorless to straw-colored in appearance. The most commonly used fuels for commercial aviation are Jet A and Jet A-1, which are produced to a standardized international specification. The only other jet fuel commonly used in civilian turbine-engine powered aviation is Jet B, which is used for its enhanced cold-weather performance.

Jet fuel is a mixture of a variety of hydrocarbons. Because the exact composition of jet fuel varies widely based on petroleum source, it is impossible to define jet fuel as a ratio of specific hydrocarbons. Jet fuel is therefore defined as a performance specification rather than a chemical compound. Furthermore, the range of molecular mass between hydrocarbons (or different carbon numbers) is defined by the requirements for the product, such as the freezing point or smoke point. Kerosene-type jet fuel (including Jet A and Jet A-1, JP-5, and JP-8) has a carbon number distribution between about 8 and 16 (carbon atoms per molecule); wide-cut or naphtha-type jet fuel (including Jet B and JP-4), between about 5 and 15.

== History ==
Fuel for piston-engine powered aircraft (usually a high-octane gasoline known as avgas) has a high volatility to improve its carburetion characteristics and high autoignition temperature to prevent preignition in high compression aircraft engines. Turbine engines (as with diesel engines) can operate with a wide range of fuels because fuel is injected into the hot combustion chamber. Jet and gas turbine (turboprop, helicopter) aircraft engines typically use lower cost fuels with higher flash points, which are less flammable and therefore safer to transport and handle.

The first axial compressor jet engine in widespread production and combat service, the Junkers Jumo 004 used on the Messerschmitt Me 262A fighter and the Arado Ar 234B jet recon-bomber, burned either a special synthetic "J2" fuel or diesel fuel. Gasoline was a third option but unattractive due to high fuel consumption. Other fuels used were kerosene or kerosene and gasoline mixtures.

Pressure to move from Jet fuel to sustainable aviation fuel, i.e. Aviation biofuel or Electrofuel, has existed since before the 2016 Paris Agreement.

== Standards ==
Most jet fuels in use since the end of World War II are kerosene-based. Both British and American standards for jet fuels were first established at the end of World War II. British standards derived from standards for kerosene use for lamps—known as paraffin in the UK—whereas American standards derived from aviation gasoline practices. Over the subsequent years, details of specifications were adjusted, such as minimum freezing point, to balance performance requirements and availability of fuels. Very low temperature freezing points reduce the availability of fuel. Higher flash point products required for use on aircraft carriers are more expensive to produce. In the United States, ASTM International produces standards for civilian fuel types, and the U.S. Department of Defense produces standards for military use. The British Ministry of Defence establishes standards for both civil and military jet fuels. For reasons of inter-operational ability, British and United States military standards are harmonized to a degree. In Russia and the CIS members, grades of jet fuels are covered by the State Standard (GOST) number, or a Technical Condition number, with the principal grade available being TS-1.

== Types ==
=== Jet A/A-1 ===
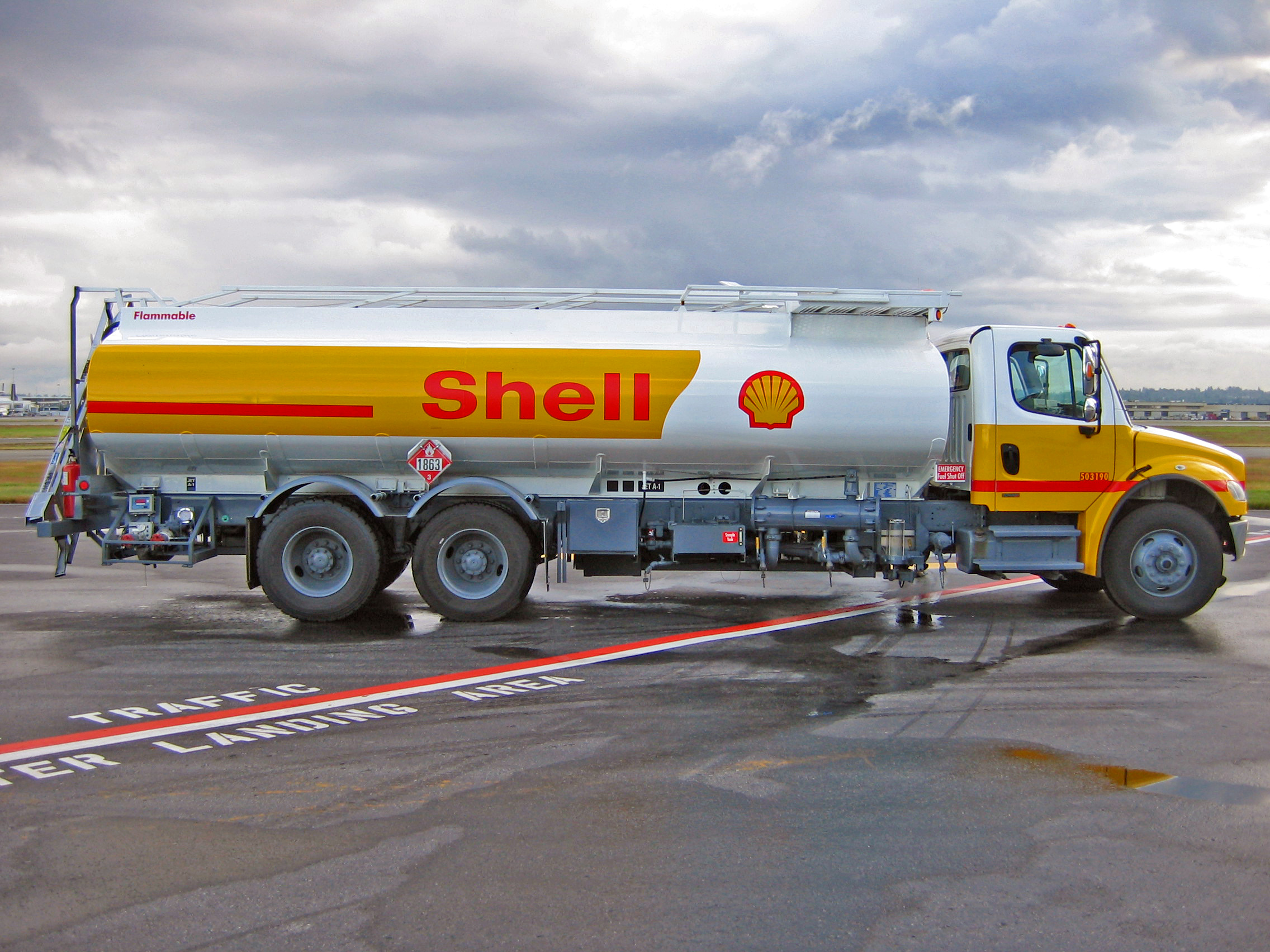
Shell Jet A-1 refueller truck on the ramp at Vancouver International Airport. Note the signs indicating UN1863 hazardous material and JET A-1.

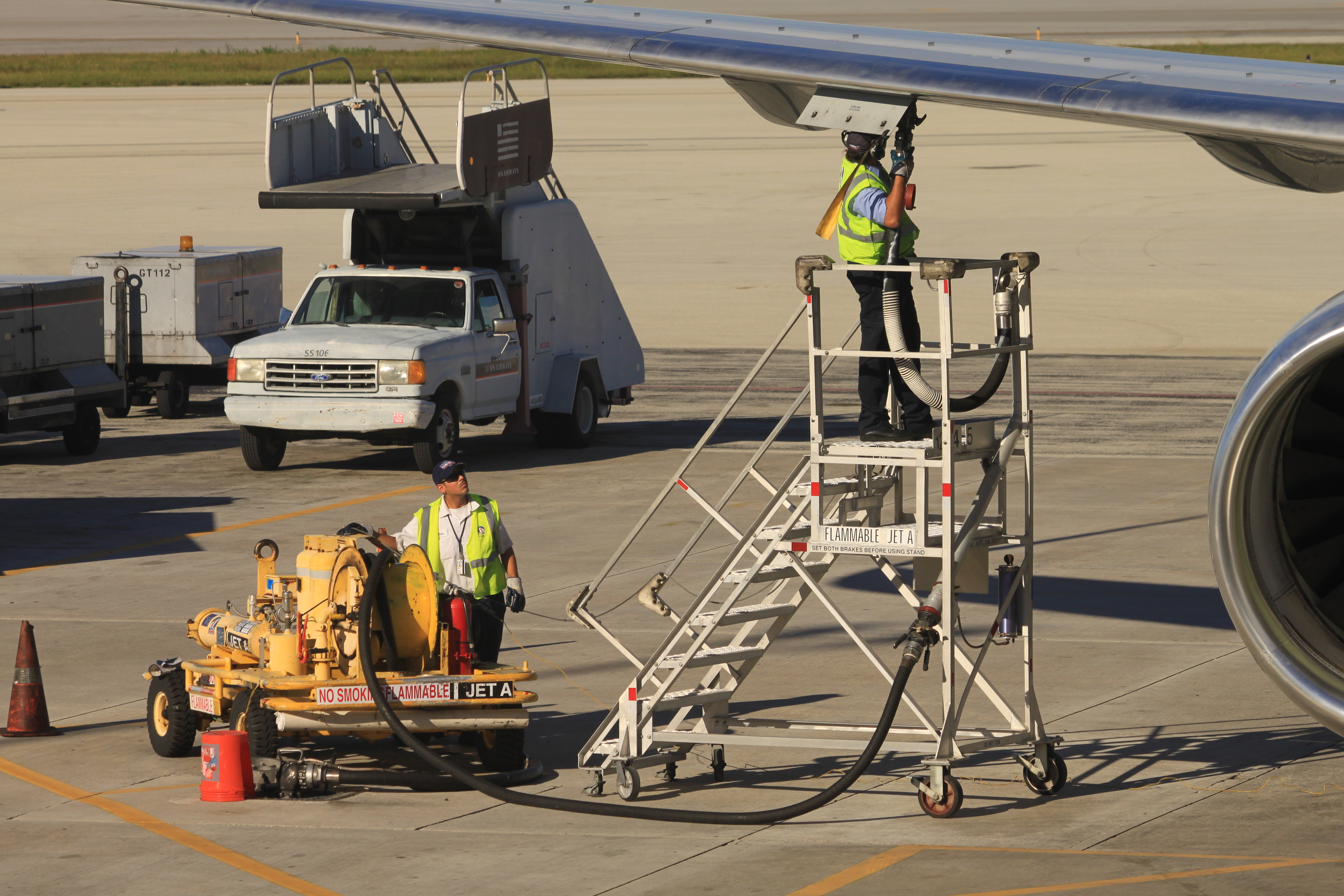
A US Airways Boeing 757 being fueled at Fort Lauderdale–Hollywood International Airport

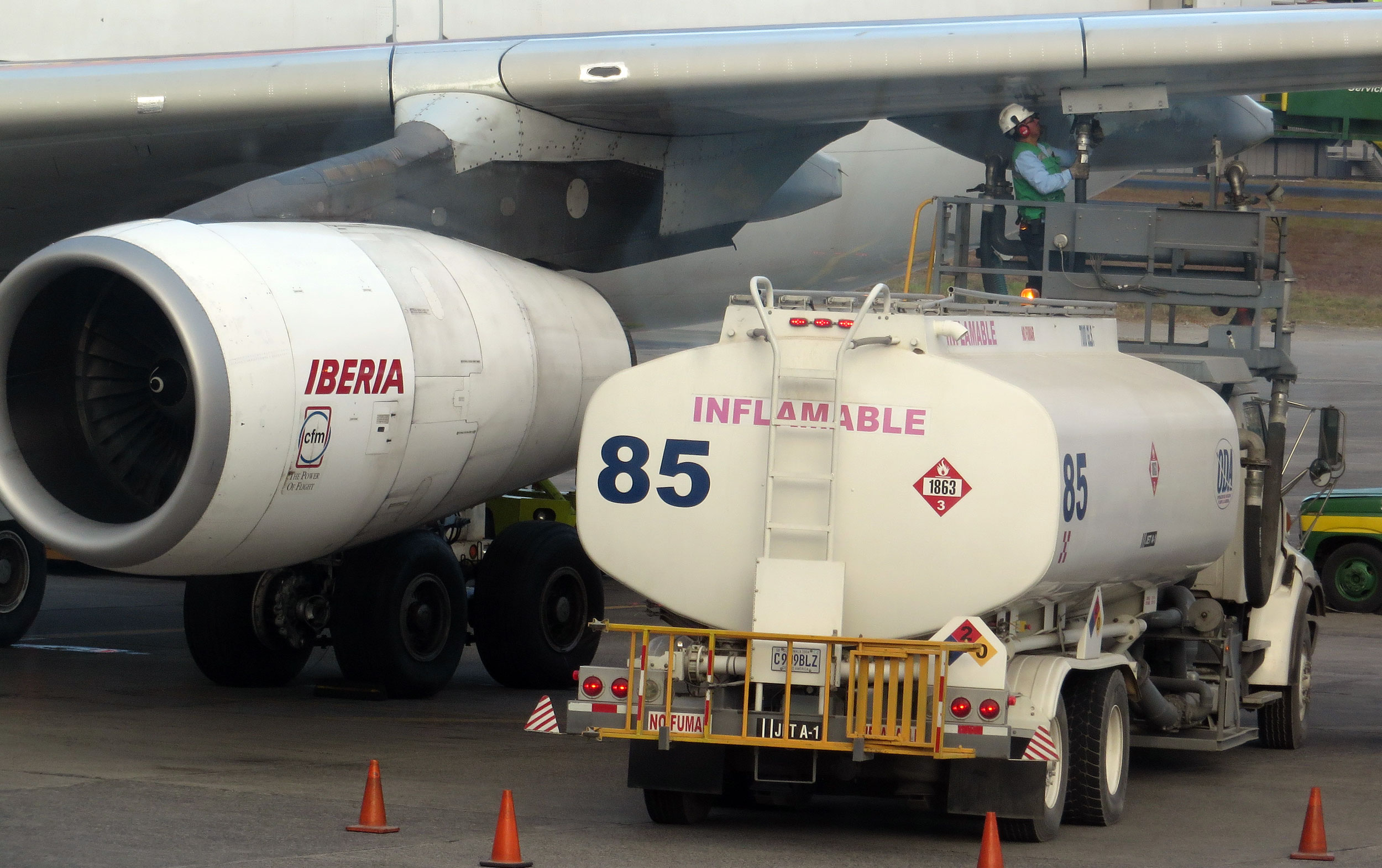
An Iberia Airbus A340 being fueled at La Aurora International Airport

Jet A specification fuel has been used in the United States since the 1950s and is usually not available outside the United States and a few Canadian airports such as Toronto, Montreal, and Vancouver, whereas Jet A-1 is the standard specification fuel used in most of the rest of the world, (Note: The Chinese RP-3 jet fuel standard is very similar to Jet A-1 fuel.) the main exceptions being Russia and the CIS members, where TS-1 fuel type is the most common standard. Both Jet A and Jet A-1 have a flash point higher than 38 °C (100 °F), with an autoignition temperature of 210 °C (410 °F). Jet A-1 is also known as AVTUR (aviation turbine) fuel.

Vehicles, pipelines, and storage tanks containing Jet A or Jet A-1 should be marked with black bands, and for vehicles and tanks should also be marked with "Jet A" or "Jet A-1" in white text on a black background.

=== Differences between Jet A and Jet A-1 ===
The differences between Jet A and Jet A-1 are twofold. The primary difference is the lower freezing point of Jet A-1 fuel:

- Jet A's is −40 °C (−40 °F)
- Jet A-1's is −47 °C (−53 °F)

The other difference is the mandatory addition of an antistatic additive to Jet A-1 fuel.

=== Typical physical properties for Jet A and Jet A-1 ===
Jet A-1 fuel must meet:

- DEF STAN 91-91 (Jet A-1),
- ASTM specification D1655 (Jet A-1), and
- IATA Guidance Material (Kerosene Type), NATO Code F-35.

Jet A fuel must reach ASTM specification D1655 (Jet A).

Typical physical properties for Jet A / Jet A-1
	Jet A-1	Jet A
Flash point	38 °C (100 °F)	
Autoignition temperature	210 °C (410 °F)	
Freezing point	−47 °C (−53 °F)	−40 °C (−40 °F)
Max adiabatic burn temperature	2,230 °C (4,050 °F) open air burn temperature: 1,030 °C (1,890 °F)	
Density at 15 °C (59 °F)	0.804 kg/L (6.71 lb/US gal)	0.820 kg/L (6.84 lb/US gal)
Specific energy	43.15 MJ/kg (11.99 kWh/kg)	43.02 MJ/kg (11.95 kWh/kg)
Energy density	34.7 MJ/L (9.6 kWh/L)	35.3 MJ/L (9.8 kWh/L)

=== Jet B ===
Jet B is a naphtha-kerosene fuel that is used for its enhanced cold-weather performance. However, Jet B's lighter composition makes it more dangerous to handle. For this reason, it is rarely used, except in very cold climates. A blend of approximately 30% kerosene and 70% gasoline, it is known as wide-cut fuel. It has a very low freezing point of −60 °C (−76 °F), and a low flash point as well. It is primarily used in northern Canada and Alaska, where the extreme cold makes its low freezing point necessary, and which helps mitigate the danger of its lower flash point. Jet B is also known as AVTAG (aviation turbine gasoline).

=== GOST standards ===
The GOST standard 10227 specifies civilian fuels, among which are TS-1, T-1, T-1S, T2 and RT. Military fuels such as T-1pp, T-8V (aka T-8B) and T-6 are specified by GOST 12308. Icing inhibitors are specified by GOST 8313. Some researchers refer to T-6 as "ram rocket fuel"; others have patented a method used to produce T-1pp from a mixture of T-6 and RT, the latter of which has been characterized as "unified Russian fuel for sub- and supersonic aircraft".

==== TS-1 ====
TS-1 is a jet fuel made to Russian standard GOST 10227 for enhanced cold-weather performance. It has somewhat higher volatility than Jet A-1 (flash point is 28 °C (82 °F) minimum). It has a very low freezing point, below −50 °C (−58 °F).

== Additives ==
The DEF STAN 91-091 (UK) and ASTM D1655 (international) specifications allow for certain additives to be added to jet fuel, including:

- Antioxidants to prevent gumming, usually based on alkylated phenols, e.g., AO-30, AO-31, or AO-37;
- Antistatic agents, to dissipate static electricity and prevent sparking; Stadis 450, with dinonylnaphthylsulfonic acid (DINNSA) as a component, is an example
- Corrosion inhibitors, e.g., DCI-4A used for civilian and military fuels, and DCI-6A used for military fuels;
- Fuel system icing inhibitor (FSII) agents, e.g., 2-(2-Methoxyethoxy)ethanol (Di-EGME); FSII is often mixed at the point-of-sale so that users with heated fuel lines do not have to pay the extra expense.
- Biocides are to remediate microbial (i.e., bacterial and fungal) growth present in aircraft fuel systems. Two biocides were previously approved for use by most aircraft and turbine engine original equipment manufacturers (OEMs); Kathon FP1.5 Microbiocide and Biobor JF. Biobor JF is currently the only biocide available for aviation use. Kathon was discontinued by the manufacturer due to several airworthiness incidents. Kathon is now banned from use in aviation fuel.
- Metal deactivator can be added to reduce the negative effects of trace metals on the thermal stability of the fuel. The one allowable additive is the chelating agent salpn (N,N′-bis(salicylidene)-1,2-propanediamine).

As the aviation industry's jet kerosene demands have increased to more than 5% of all refined products derived from crude, it has been necessary for the refiner to optimize the yield of jet kerosene, a high-value product, by varying process techniques.

New processes have allowed flexibility in the choice of crudes, the use of coal tar sands as a source of molecules and the manufacture of synthetic blend stocks. Due to the number and severity of the processes used, it is often necessary and sometimes mandatory to use additives. These additives may, for example, prevent the formation of harmful chemical species or improve a property of a fuel to prevent further engine wear.

== Water in jet fuel ==
It is very important that jet fuel be free from water contamination. During flight, the temperature of the fuel in the tanks decreases, due to the low temperatures in the upper atmosphere. This causes precipitation of the dissolved water from the fuel. The separated water then drops to the bottom of the tank because it is denser than the fuel. Since the water is no longer in solution, it can form droplets which can supercool to below 0 °C (32 °F). If these supercooled droplets collide with a surface they can freeze and may result in blocked fuel inlet pipes. This was the cause of the British Airways Flight 38 accident. Removing all water from fuel is impractical; therefore, fuel heaters are usually used on commercial aircraft to prevent water in fuel from freezing.

There are several methods for detecting water in jet fuel. A visual check may detect high concentrations of suspended water, as this causes the fuel to become hazy in appearance. An industry standard chemical test for the detection of free water in jet fuel uses a water-sensitive filter pad that turns green if the fuel exceeds the specification limit of 30 ppm (parts per million) free water.

== Military jet fuels ==
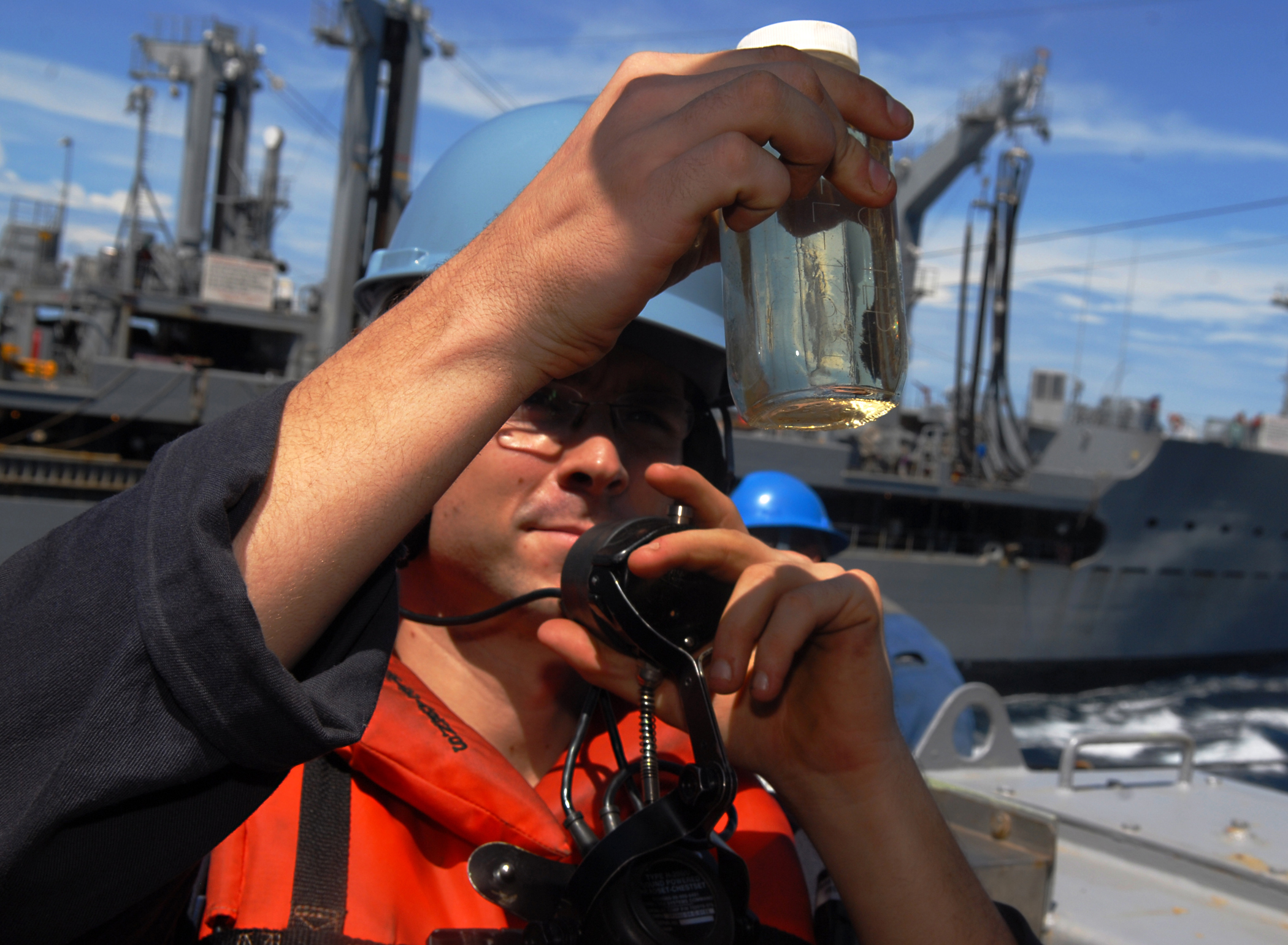
A sailor inspects a sample of JP-5 jet fuel aboard an amphibious transport dock ship

Military organizations around the world use a different classification system of JP (for "Jet Propellant") numbers. Some are almost identical to their civilian counterparts and differ only by the amounts of a few additives; Jet A-1 is similar to JP-8, Jet B is similar to JP-4. Other military fuels are highly specialized products and are developed for very specific applications.

JP-1
was an early jet fuel specified in 1944 by the United States government (AN-F-32). It was a pure kerosene fuel with high flash point (relative to aviation gasoline) and a freezing point of −60 °C (−76 °F). The low freezing point requirement limited availability of the fuel and it was soon superseded by other "wide cut" jet fuels which were kerosene-naphtha or kerosene-gasoline blends. It was also known as avtur.

JP-2
an obsolete type developed during World War II. JP-2 was intended to be easier to produce than JP-1 since it had a higher freezing point, but was never widely used.

JP-3
was an attempt to improve availability of the fuel compared to JP-1 by widening the cut and loosening tolerances on impurities to ensure ready supply. In his book Ignition! An Informal History of Liquid Rocket Propellants, John D. Clark described the specification as, "remarkably liberal, with a wide cut (range of distillation temperatures) and with such permissive limits on olefins and aromatics that any refinery above the level of a Kentucky moonshiner's pot still could convert at least half of any crude to jet fuel". It was even more volatile than JP-2 and had high evaporation loss in service.

JP-4
was a 50-50 kerosene-gasoline blend. It had lower flash point than JP-1, but was preferred because of its greater availability. It was the primary United States Air Force jet fuel between 1951 and 1995. Its NATO code is F-40. JP-4 is also known as AVTAG/FSII (aviation turbine gasoline/fuel systems icing inhibitor) fuel.

JP-5
is a yellow kerosene-based jet fuel developed in 1952 for use in aircraft stationed aboard aircraft carriers, where the risk from fire is particularly great. JP-5 is a complex mixture of hydrocarbons, containing alkanes, naphthenes, and aromatic hydrocarbons that weighs 6.8 pounds per U.S. gallon (0.81 kg/L) and has a high flash point (min. 60 °C or 140 °F). Because some US naval air stations, Marine Corps air stations and Coast Guard air stations host both sea and land based naval aircraft, these installations will also typically fuel their shore-based aircraft with JP-5, thus precluding the need to maintain separate fuel facilities for JP-5 and non-JP-5 fuel. Similarly, China named their navy fuel RP-5. Its freezing point is −46 °C (−51 °F), and it does not contain antistatic agents. JP-5 is also known as NCI-C54784. JP-5's NATO code is F-44. It is also called AVCAT (aviation carrier turbine) fuel.

The JP-4 and JP-5 fuels, covered by the MIL-DTL-5624 and meeting the British Specification DEF STAN 91-86 AVCAT/FSII (formerly DERD 2452), are intended for use in aircraft turbine engines. These fuels require unique additives that are necessary for military aircraft and engine fuel systems.

JP-6
was developed for the General Electric YJ93 afterburning turbojet engines used in the North American XB-70 Valkyrie for sustained flight at Mach 3. It was similar to JP-5 but with a lower freezing point and improved thermal oxidative stability. When the XB-70 program was cancelled, the JP-6 specification, MIL-J-25656, was also cancelled.

JP-7
was developed for the Pratt & Whitney J58 afterburning turbojet engines used in the Lockheed SR-71 Blackbird for sustained flight at Mach 3+. It had a high flash point required to prevent boiloff caused by aerodynamic heating. Its thermal stability was high enough to prevent coke and varnish deposits when used as a heat sink medium for aircraft air conditioning and hydraulic systems and engine accessories.

JP-8
is a jet fuel, specified and used widely by the U.S. military. It is specified by MIL-DTL-83133 and British Defence Standard 91-87. JP-8 is a kerosene-based fuel. The United States military uses JP-8 as a "universal fuel" in both turbine-powered aircraft and diesel-powered ground vehicles. It was first introduced at NATO bases in 1978. Its NATO code is F-34. It is also known as AVTUR/FSII (aviation turbine/fuel systems icing inhibitor) fuel.

JP-9
is a gas turbine fuel for missiles, specifically the Tomahawk cruise missile, containing the TH-dimer (tetrahydrodimethyldicyclopentadiene) produced by catalytic hydrogenation of methylpentadiene dimer.

JP-10
is a gas turbine fuel for missiles, specifically the AGM-86 ALCM cruise missile. It contains a mixture of (in decreasing order) endo-tetrahydrodicyclopentadiene, exo-tetrahydrodicyclopentadiene (a synthetic fuel), and adamantane. It is produced by catalytic hydrogenation of dicyclopentadiene. It superseded JP-9 fuel, achieving a lower low-temperature service limit of −65 °F (−54 °C). It is also used by the Tomahawk jet-powered subsonic cruise missile.

JPTS
was a combination of LF-1 charcoal lighter fluid and an additive to improve thermal oxidative stability officially known as "Thermally Stable Jet Fuel". It was developed in 1956 for the Pratt & Whitney J57 engine which powered the Lockheed U-2 spy plane.

Zip fuel
designates a series of experimental boron-containing "high energy fuels" intended for long range aircraft. The toxicity and undesirable residues of the fuel made it difficult to use. The development of the ballistic missile removed the principal application of zip fuel.

== Piston engine use ==
Jet fuel is very similar to diesel fuel, and in some cases, may be used in diesel engines. The possibility of environmental legislation banning the use of leaded avgas (fuel in spark-ignited internal combustion engine, which usually contains tetraethyllead (TEL), a toxic substance added to prevent engine knocking), and the lack of a replacement fuel with similar performance, has left aircraft designers and pilot organizations searching for alternative engines for use in small aircraft. As a result, only a few aircraft engine manufacturers, most notably Thielert and Austro Engine, have begun offering aircraft diesel engines which run on jet fuel, which may simplify airport logistics by reducing the number of fuel types required. Jet fuel is available in most places in the world, whereas avgas is only widely available in a few countries which have a large number of general aviation aircraft. A diesel engine may be more fuel-efficient than an avgas engine. However, very few diesel aircraft engines have been certified by aviation authorities. Diesel aircraft engines are uncommon today, even though opposed-piston aviation diesel powerplants such as the Junkers Jumo 205 family had been used during the Second World War.

Jet fuel is often used in diesel-powered ground-support vehicles at airports. However, jet fuel tends to have poor lubricating ability in comparison to diesel, which increases wear in fuel injection equipment. An additive may be required to restore its lubricity. Jet fuel is more expensive than diesel fuel but the logistical advantages of using one fuel can offset the extra expense of its use in certain circumstances.

Jet fuel contains more sulfur, up to 1,000 ppm, which therefore means it has better lubricity and does not currently require a lubricity additive as all pipeline diesel fuels require. The introduction of Ultra Low Sulfur Diesel or ULSD brought with it the need for lubricity modifiers. Pipeline diesels before ULSD were able to contain up to 500 ppm of sulfur and were called Low Sulfur Diesel or LSD. In the United States LSD is now only available to the off-road construction, locomotive and marine markets. As more EPA regulations are introduced, more refineries are hydrotreating their jet fuel production, thus limiting the lubricating abilities of jet fuel, as determined by ASTM Standard D445.

JP-8, which is similar to Jet A-1, is used in NATO diesel vehicles as part of the single-fuel policy.

== Synthetic jet fuel ==
Fischer–Tropsch (FT) Synthesized Paraffinic Kerosene (SPK) synthetic fuels are certified for use in United States and international aviation fleets at up to 50% in a blend with conventional jet fuel. As of the end of 2017, four other pathways to SPK are certified, with their designations and maximum blend percentage in brackets: Hydroprocessed Esters and Fatty Acids (HEFA SPK, 50%); synthesized iso-paraffins from hydroprocessed fermented sugars (SIP, 10%); synthesized paraffinic kerosene plus aromatics (SPK/A, 50%); alcohol-to-jet SPK (ATJ-SPK, 30%). Both FT and HEFA based SPKs blended with JP-8 are specified in MIL-DTL-83133H.

Some synthetic jet fuels show a reduction in pollutants such as SOx, NOx, particulate matter, and sometimes carbon emissions. It is envisaged that usage of synthetic jet fuels will increase air quality around airports which will be particularly advantageous at inner city airports.

Qatar Airways became the first airline to operate a commercial flight on a 50:50 blend of synthetic Gas to Liquid (GTL) jet fuel and conventional jet fuel. The natural gas derived synthetic kerosene for the six-hour flight from London to Doha came from Shell's GTL plant in Bintulu, Malaysia. The world's first passenger aircraft flight to use only synthetic jet fuel was from Lanseria International Airport to Cape Town International Airport on September 22, 2010. The fuel was developed by Sasol.

Chemist Heather Willauer is leading a team of researchers at the U.S. Naval Research Laboratory who are developing a process to make jet fuel from seawater. The technology requires an input of electrical energy to separate Oxygen (O_{2}) and Hydrogen (H_{2}) gas from seawater using an iron-based catalyst, followed by an oligomerization step wherein carbon monoxide (CO) and hydrogen are recombined into long-chain hydrocarbons, using zeolite as the catalyst. The technology is expected to be deployed in the 2020s by U.S. Navy warships, especially nuclear-powered aircraft carriers.

On February 8, 2021, the world's first scheduled passenger flight flew with some synthetic kerosene from a non-fossil fuel source. 500 liters of synthetic kerosene was mixed with regular jet fuel. Synthetic kerosene was produced by Shell and the flight was operated by KLM.

=== USAF synthetic fuel trials ===
On August 8, 2007, Air Force Secretary Michael Wynne certified the B-52H as fully approved to use the FT blend, marking the formal conclusion of the test program. This program is part of the Department of Defense Assured Fuel Initiative, an effort to develop secure domestic sources for the military energy needs. The Pentagon hopes to reduce its use of crude oil from foreign producers and obtain about half of its aviation fuel from alternative sources by 2016. With the B-52 now approved to use the FT blend, the USAF will use the test protocols developed during the program to certify the Boeing C-17 Globemaster III and then the Rockwell B-1B Lancer to use the fuel. To test these two aircraft, the USAF has ordered 281,000 US gal (1,060,000 L) of FT fuel. The USAF intends to test and certify every airframe in its inventory to use the fuel by 2011. They will also supply over 9,000 US gal (34,000 L; 7,500 imp gal) to NASA for testing in various aircraft and engines.

The USAF has certified the B-1B, B-52H, C-17, Lockheed Martin C-130J Super Hercules, McDonnell Douglas F-4 Phantom (as QF-4 target drones), McDonnell Douglas F-15 Eagle, Lockheed Martin F-22 Raptor, and Northrop T-38 Talon to use the synthetic fuel blend.

The U.S. Air Force's C-17 Globemaster III, F-16 and F-15 are certified for use of hydrotreated renewable jet fuels. The USAF plans to certify over 40 models for fuels derived from waste oils and plants by 2013. The U.S. Army is considered one of the few customers of biofuels large enough to potentially bring biofuels up to the volume production needed to reduce costs. The U.S. Navy has also flown a Boeing F/A-18E/F Super Hornet dubbed the "Green Hornet" at 1.7 times the speed of sound using a biofuel blend. The Defense Advanced Research Projects Agency (DARPA) funded a $6.7 million project with Honeywell UOP to develop technologies to create jet fuels from biofeedstocks for use by the United States and NATO militaries.

In April 2011, four USAF F-15E Strike Eagles flew over the Philadelphia Phillies opening ceremony using a blend of traditional jet fuel and synthetic biofuels. This flyover made history as it was the first flyover to use biofuels in the Department of Defense.

=== Jet biofuels ===
The air transport industry is responsible for 2–3 percent of man-made carbon dioxide emitted. Boeing estimates that biofuels could reduce flight-related greenhouse-gas emissions by 60 to 80 percent. One possible solution which has received more media coverage than others would be blending synthetic fuel derived from algae with existing jet fuel:

- Green Flight International became the first airline to fly jet aircraft on 100% biofuel. The flight from Reno Stead Airport in Stead, Nevada was in an Aero L-29 Delfín piloted by Carol Sugars and Douglas Rodante.
- Boeing and Air New Zealand are collaborating with Tecbio Aquaflow Bionomic and other jet biofuel developers around the world.
- Virgin Atlantic successfully tested a biofuel blend consisting of 20 percent babassu nuts and coconut and 80 percent conventional jet fuel, which was fed to a single engine on a 747 flight from London Heathrow to Amsterdam Schiphol.
- A consortium consisting of Boeing, NASA's Glenn Research Center, MTU Aero Engines (Germany), and the U.S. Air Force Research Laboratory is working on development of jet fuel blends containing a substantial percentage of biofuel.
- British Airways and Velocys have entered into a partnership in the UK to design a series of plants that convert household waste into jet fuel.
- 24 commercial and military biofuel flights have taken place using Honeywell "Green Jet Fuel," including a Navy F/A-18 Hornet.
- In 2011, United Continental Holdings was the first United States airline to fly passengers on a commercial flight using a blend of sustainable, advanced biofuels and traditional petroleum-derived jet fuel. Solazyme developed the algae oil, which was refined utilizing Honeywell's UOP process technology, into jet fuel to power the commercial flight.

Solazyme produced the world's first 100 percent algae-derived jet fuel, Solajet, for both commercial and military applications.

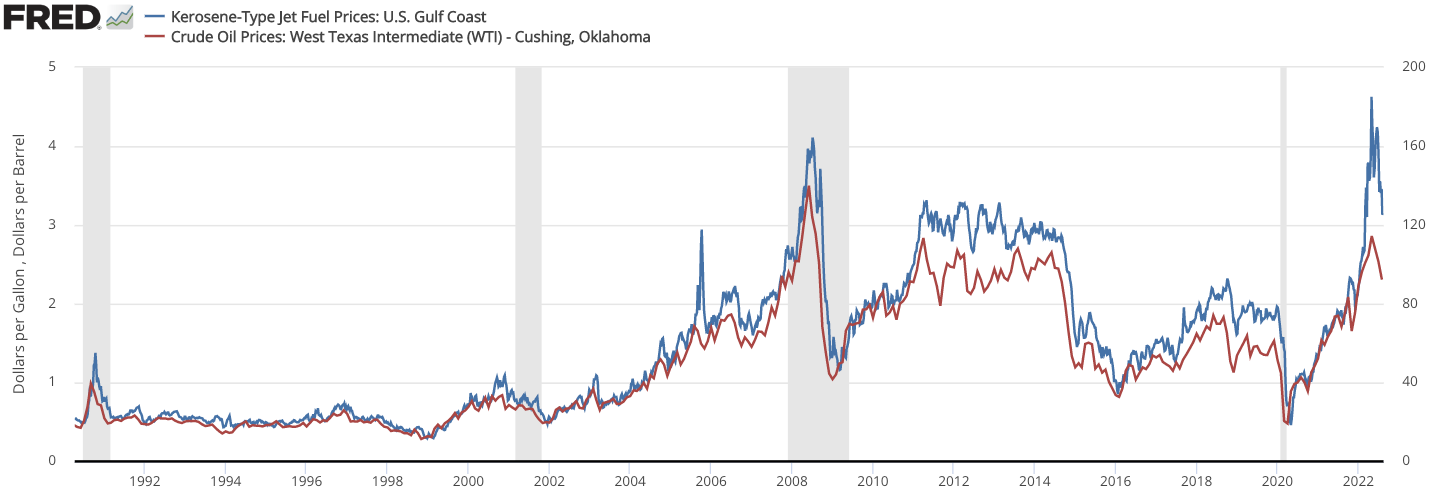
Jet fuel vs oil prices

Oil prices increased about fivefold from 2003 to 2008, raising fears that world petroleum production is becoming unable to keep up with demand. The fact that there are few alternatives to petroleum for aviation fuel adds urgency to the search for alternatives. Twenty-five airlines were bankrupted or stopped operations in the first six months of 2008, largely due to fuel costs.

In 2015 ASTM approved a modification to Specification D1655 Standard Specification for Aviation Turbine Fuels to permit up to 50 ppm (50 mg/kg) of FAME (fatty acid methyl ester) in jet fuel to allow higher cross-contamination from biofuel production.

== Worldwide consumption of jet fuel ==
Worldwide demand of jet fuel has been steadily increasing since 1980. Consumption more than tripled in 30 years from 1,837,000 barrels/day in 1980, to 5,220,000 in 2010. Around 30% of the worldwide consumption of jet fuel is in the US (1,398,130 barrels/day in 2012).

== Taxation ==
Article 24 of the Chicago Convention on International Civil Aviation of 7 December 1944 stipulates that when flying from one contracting state to another, the fuel that is already on board aircraft may not be taxed by the state where the aircraft lands, nor by a state through whose airspace the aircraft has flown. This is to prevent double taxation. It is sometimes suggested that the Chicago Convention precludes the taxation of aviation fuel. However, this is not correct. The Chicago Convention does not preclude a fuel tax on domestic flights or on refuelling before international flights.

Article 15 of the Chicago Convention is also sometimes said to ban fuel taxes. Article 15 states: "No fees, dues or other charges shall be imposed by any contracting State in respect solely of the right of transit over or entry into or exit from its territory of any aircraft of a contracting State or persons or property thereon." However, ICAO distinguishes between charges and taxes, and Article 15 does not prohibit the levying of taxes without a service provided.

In the European Union, commercial aviation fuel is exempt from taxation, according to the 2003 Energy Taxation Directive. EU member states may tax jet fuel via bilateral agreements, however no such agreements exist.

In the United States, most states tax jet fuel.

== Health effects ==
General health hazards associated with exposure to jet fuel vary according to its components, exposure duration (acute vs. long-term), route of administration (dermal vs. respiratory vs. oral), and exposure phase (vapor vs. aerosol vs. raw fuel). Kerosene-based hydrocarbon fuels are complex mixtures which may contain up to 260+ aliphatic and aromatic hydrocarbon compounds including toxicants such as benzene, n-hexane, toluene, xylenes, trimethylpentane, methoxyethanol, naphthalenes. While time-weighted average hydrocarbon fuel exposures can often be below recommended exposure limits, peak exposure can occur, and the health impact of occupational exposures is not fully understood. Evidence of the health effects of jet fuels comes from reports on both temporary or persisting biological from acute, subchronic, or chronic exposure of humans or animals to kerosene-based hydrocarbon fuels, or the constituent chemicals of these fuels, or to fuel combustion products. The effects studied include: cancer, skin conditions, respiratory disorders, immune and hematological disorders, neurological effects, visual and hearing disorders, renal and hepatic diseases, cardiovascular conditions, gastrointestinal disorders, genotoxic and metabolic effects.

== See also ==
- Index of aviation articles
