= L-rhamnono-1,4-lactonase =

Identifiers
- EC no.: 3.1.1.65

Databases
- BRENDA: enzyme data
- ExPASy: NiceZyme view
- KEGG: enzyme entry
- MetaCyc: metabolic pathway
- Rhea: reactions
- PDB structures: RCSB PDB PDBe PDBsum
- Gene Ontology: AmiGO / QuickGO
Search
- PMC: articles
- PubMed: articles
- NCBI: proteins

The enzyme L-rhamnono-1,4-lactonase (EC 3.1.1.65) catalyzes the reaction

L-rhamnono-1,4-lactone
H_{2}O
H_{2}O
L-rhamnonic acid

The enzyme characterised from Pullularia pullulans, Pichia stipitis and Debaryomyces polymorphus hydrolyses L-rhamnono-1,4-lactone to L-rhamnonic acid. The enzyme belongs to the amidohydrolase superfamily and is a member of Cluster of Orthologous Groups (COG) 3618.

== Nomenclature ==
This enzyme is a hydrolase, specifically one acting on carboxylic ester bonds. The systematic name is L-rhamnono-1,4-lactone lactonohydrolase. Other names in common use include Lrhamno-γ-lactonase, L-rhamnono-γ-lactonase, and L-rhamnonate dehydratase.
