= D-arabinitol dehydrogenase (NADP+) =

D-arabinitol dehydrogenase (NADP^{+})

Identifiers
- EC no.: 1.1.1.287

Databases
- IntEnz: IntEnz view
- BRENDA: BRENDA entry
- ExPASy: NiceZyme view
- KEGG: KEGG entry
- MetaCyc: metabolic pathway
- PRIAM: profile
- PDB structures: RCSB PDB PDBe PDBsum
Search
- PMC: articles
- PubMed: articles
- NCBI: proteins

D-arabinitol dehydrogenase (NADP^{+}) (EC 1.1.1.287, NADP^{+}-dependent D-arabitol dehydrogenase, ARD1p, D-arabitol dehydrogenase 1) is an enzyme with systematic name D-arabinitol:NADP^{+} oxidoreductase. This enzyme catalyses the following chemical reactions:

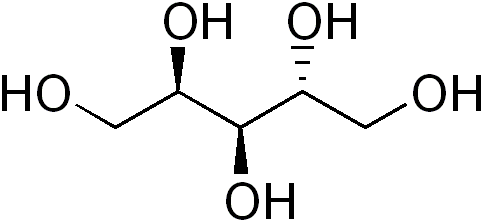
D-arabitinol
+ NADP^{+}
H^{+}
H^{+}
D-xylulose
+ NADPH
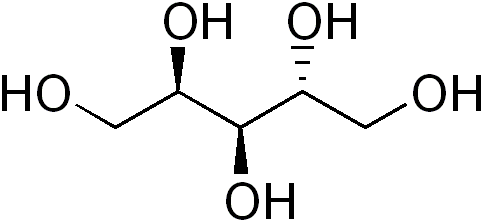
D-arabitinol
+ NADP^{+}
H^{+}
H^{+}
D-ribulose
+ NADPH

The enzyme present in the fungus Uromyces fabae can make use D-arabinitol and D-mannitol in the forward direction, and D-xylulose, D-ribulose and D-fructose in the reverse direction.
