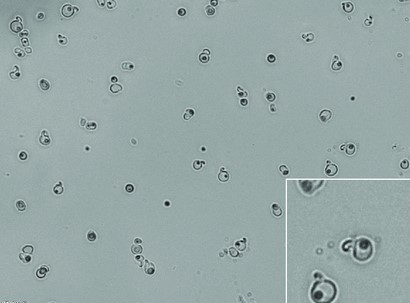

Scientific classification
- Kingdom: Fungi
- Division: Ascomycota
- Class: Pichiomycetes
- Order: Serinales
- Family: Debaryomycetaceae
- Genus: Debaryomyces
- Species: D. hansenii

Binomial name
- Debaryomyces hansenii (Zopf) Lodder & Kreger-van Rij (1984)

Synonyms
- Saccharomyces hansenii Zopf (1889)

= Debaryomyces hansenii =

Species of fungus

Debaryomyces hansenii, also known as Candida famata, is a species of yeast in the family Saccharomycetaceae.

== Pathogenicity ==
Debaryomyces hansenii accounts for up to 2% of invasive candidiasis cases. It has been found in Crohn's disease ulcerations in humans and is being investigated as the environmental trigger of Crohn's disease. Certain strains of Debaryomyces hansenii have been researched for potential use as probiotics and may have health benefits.

== Ecology ==
Debaryomyces hansenii is an osmo-, halo- and xerotolerant yeast that produces toxins, including mycocins, to destroy competitive yeast species. It is a common species in all types of cheese, including soft cheeses and the brines of semi-hard and hard cheeses, and the most common yeast among 383 isolates from samples of unsulfited or sulfited sausages, skinless sausages and minced beef. It contributes to the fermentation of barrel-aged beers such as Le Coq Imperial Stout from Harveys Brewery in southern England. Harvey's head brewer speculates that it is either airborne in the brewery or a slow-growing component of their house yeast blend. D. hansenii is also found in hyper-saline waters such as the salterns on the Atlantic coast of Namibia or in the Great Salt Lake of Utah.

== Nutritional requirements ==
The species can be cultivated in media with up to 25% NaCl or 18% glycerol. Growth rate increases in solutions with ≥ 1M NaCl or KCl, with sodium and potassium ions playing a very important role in the mechanisms involved in maintaining osmobalance. The species can survive a pH range between 3 and 10. Furthermore, D. hansenii has been described as the species with the highest perchlorate tolerance reported to date, which might have consequences for the microbial habitability of Mars, where perchlorate salts are widely distributed.

== Reproduction ==
Most strains are haploid, mating very rarely and diploidize transiently by somatogamous autogamy (i.e. fusion of two cells but excluding their nuclei). Sexual reproduction proceeds via heterogamous conjugation (i.e. the conjugation of two cells of different form or size) leading to short diplophase followed by meiosis and ascospore formation. Haploid yeasts reproduce vegetatively by multilateral budding.

== Genetics ==
This species has seven chromosomes, labeled A-G. This species uses an alternative genetic code for the codon CUG, coding for the amino acid serine instead of the usual leucine.

== Differentiation ==
The ability of this species to grow at 10% NaCl or 5% glucose is used to discriminate D. hansenii from other ascomycetous yeasts. The species comprises two varieties: D. hansenii var. hansenii and var. fabryii. These two groups can be differentiated via rRNA, the electrophoretic mobility of their glucose-6-phosphate dehydrogenase, or by their maximum grow temperatures (35 °C for var. hansenii and 39 °C for var. fabryii).

== Biotechnology ==
The species has been demonstrated to synthesize useful quantities of D-arabinitol, riboflavin, xylitol, and pyruvic acid under thiamine limitation. The species has also been used to decarboxylate ferulic acid to 2-Methoxy-4-vinylphenol via biotransformation (a 95.07% yield, 1470.8 mg/L, within 10 hours).
