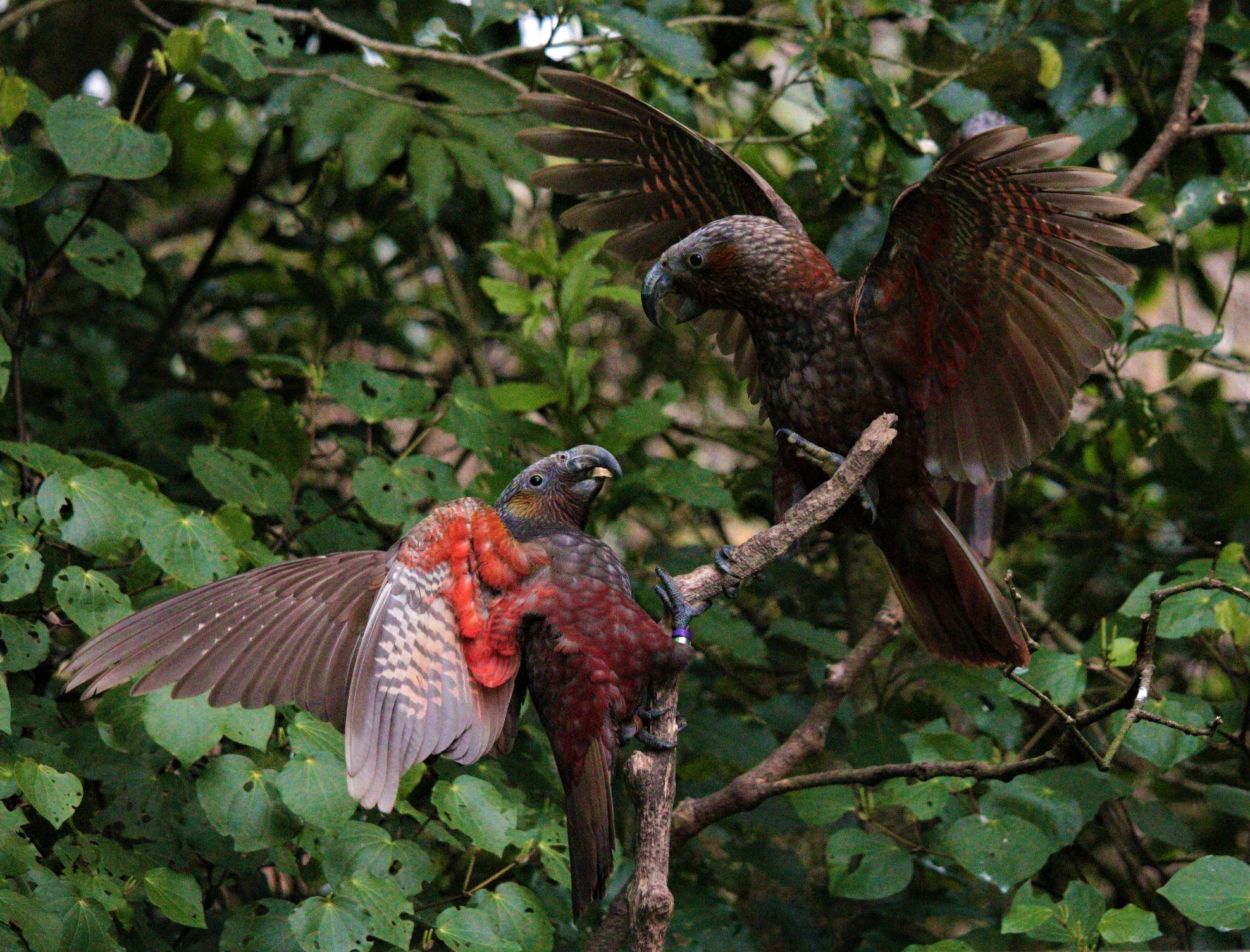
- A pair of North Island kākā in Zealandia, Wellington, New Zealand

Conservation status
- Vulnerable (IUCN 3.1)
- CITES Appendix II

Scientific classification
- Kingdom: Animalia
- Phylum: Chordata
- Class: Aves
- Order: Psittaciformes
- Family: Strigopidae
- Genus: Nestor
- Species: N. meridionalis

Binomial name
- Nestor meridionalis (Gmelin, JF, 1788)
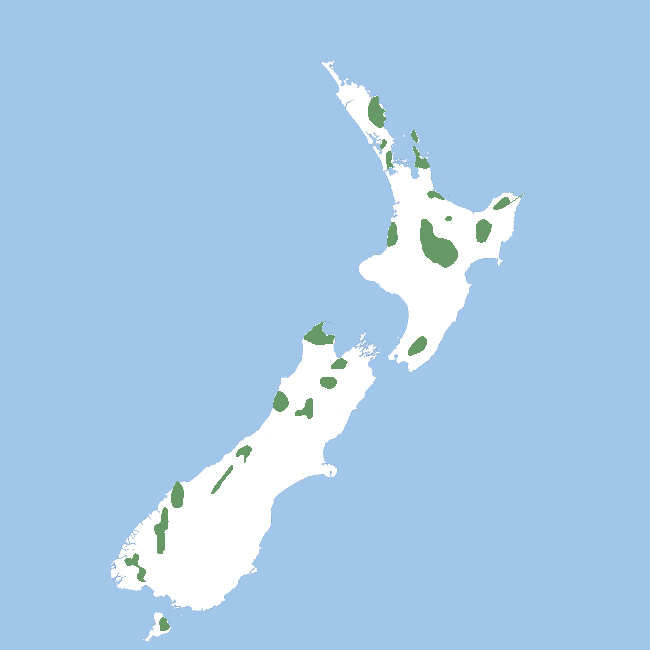
- Range in green

= Kākā =

New Zealand kākā

Species of bird

The New Zealand kākā (Nestor meridionalis) is a large species of parrot of the family Strigopidae found in native forests of New Zealand. The species is often known by the abbreviated name kākā, although it shares this name with the Norfolk kākā and Chatham kākā, both recently extinct. Two subspecies of New Zealand kākā are recognised. It is endangered and has disappeared from much of its former range, though the re-introduction of North Island kākā at Zealandia in Wellington has led to an increasing population of the birds across the city.

== Taxonomy ==
The New Zealand kākā was formally described in 1788 by the German naturalist Johann Friedrich Gmelin in his revised and expanded edition of Carl Linnaeus's Systema Naturae. He placed it with the parrots in the genus Psittacus and coined the binomial name Psittacus meridionalis. The specific epithet meridionalis is Latin meaning "southern". Gmelin based his description on the "Southern brown parrot" from New Zealand that had been described in 1781 by the English ornithologist John Latham in his book A General Synopsis of Birds. Latham had examined a preserved specimen in the Leverian Museum in London. The New Zealand kākā is now placed in the genus Nestor that was introduced in 1830 by René Lesson.

There are two subspecies: the North Island kākā (Nestor meridionalis septentrionalis) and the South Island kākā (N. m. meridionalis), although more recent research has ruled out allopatric subspeciation. The Māori language name kākā means "parrot", possibly related to kā, 'to screech'.

The genus Nestor contains four species, two of which are extinct: the New Zealand kākā (Nestor meridionalis), the kea (N. notabilis), the extinct Norfolk kākā (N. productus), and the extinct Chatham kākā (N. chathamensis). All four are thought to stem from a "proto-kākā", dwelling in the forests of New Zealand five million years ago. The closest living relative to the genus Nestor is the kākāpō or owl-parrot (Strigops habroptilus). Together, they form the parrot superfamily Strigopoidea, an ancient group that split off from all other Psittaciformes before their radiation.

The New Zealand kākā's closest living relative is the kea; the kea and the New Zealand kākā became separate species 1.72 million years ago due to ecological divergence. This likely occurred due to changes in the climate during the Pleistocene that drove the New Zealand kākā to specialise in more forested environments and the kea to specialise in alpine and other habitats. This is why New Zealand kākā are found in more forested areas with complex canopies compared to the kea. There is also more genetic diversity within the New Zealand kākā when compared to both the kea and the kākāpō.

== Description ==
The New Zealand kākā is a medium-sized parrot, measuring 45 cm (18 in) in length and weighing from 390 to 560 g (14 to 20 oz), with an average of 452 g (0.996 lb). It is closely related to the kea, but has darker plumage and is more arboreal. The forehead and crown are greyish-white and the nape is greyish brown. The neck and abdomen are more reddish, while the wings are more brownish. Both sub-species have a strongly patterned brown/green/grey plumage with orange and scarlet flashes under the wings; colour variants that show red to yellow colouration especially on the breast are sometimes found.

North-island-kaka

South-island-kaka

The calls include a harsh ka-aa and a whistling u-wiia.

Kākā beak morphology also differs slightly from its closest relatives, the kea and kākāpō. The rhinotheca (upper part of the beak) of the kākā is narrower than the kākāpō and slightly longer. However, it is not as long and sharp as the rhinotheca seen in kea. Therefore, the kākā's bill is between the kea and kākāpō in length, sharpness, and width.

There is some evidence of sexual dimorphism in the North Island kākā, with males tending to have larger bills than females. Male culmen lengths tended to be, on average, 13.6% and 12.4% larger than female culmen lengths. This is suggested to have evolved in male kākā due to the high proportion of provisioning the male kākā have to do for female kākā and hatchlings during the breeding season. Therefore, a larger culmen is needed to access food sources such as wood-boring larvae which only males tend to seek out.

== Distribution and habitat ==
The New Zealand kākā lives in lowland and mid-altitude native forest. They tend to inhabit mature native forests with a more complex canopy. The kākā was once widespread throughout most of New Zealand; however, due to habitat modification, predation and resource competition from introduced animals, its distribution has now significantly decreased. Its strongholds are currently the offshore reserves of Kapiti Island, Codfish Island / Whenua Hou and Little Barrier Island. As of 2021, less than 50% of the kākā population was found on the mainland. It is breeding rapidly in the mainland island sanctuary at Zealandia with over 800 birds banded since their reintroduction in 2002. From their reintroduction in 2002, North Island kākā continue to recolonise Wellington and a 2015 report showed a significant increase in their numbers over the preceding 12 years.

=== South Island kākā ===
South Island kākā with greener plumage and more white on top of its head

New Zealand kākā are still considered common and easy to find in certain large forested areas of the South Island. Kākā can be found in Rotoiti Nature Recovery Project, along the Milford Track and in the Eglinton Valley in Fiordland National Park. The South Island kākā, N. m. meridionalis, can be distinguished from the North Island kākā by slight differences in its plumage. The South Island kākā has more white plumage on the top of its head compared to the North Island kākā and has brighter green plumage, with the North Island kākā having more olive-brown plumage. The South Island males also tend to weigh approximately 100g more than the North Island males. However, there is no evidence showing any significant genetic differences between the North Island and South Island subspecies.

New Zealand kākā can also be found around Stewart Island / Rakiura and the offshore Islands of Codfish Island / Whenua Hou and Ulva Island.

Female kākā were reintroduced into Abel Tasman National Park in 2015; by the final release in 2019, 35 captive-raised kākā had been released into the park.

== Behaviour ==
New Zealand kākā are mainly arboreal and occupy mid-to-high canopy. They are often seen flying across valleys or calling from the top of emergent trees. They are very gregarious and move in large flocks that often include kea, where they are present. They are not obligate social animals and go between living in groups and being solitary, where they vocalise less. Their behaviour in group environments shows their high cognition by demonstrating their complex interactions through social play and communication. They are partially nocturnal, and are highly active at dawn and dusk and can sometimes be heard calling loudly. Kākā usually can be seen in groups of 3-5 and often forage alone but can form large groups around food sources like flowering or fruiting trees.

=== Breeding ===
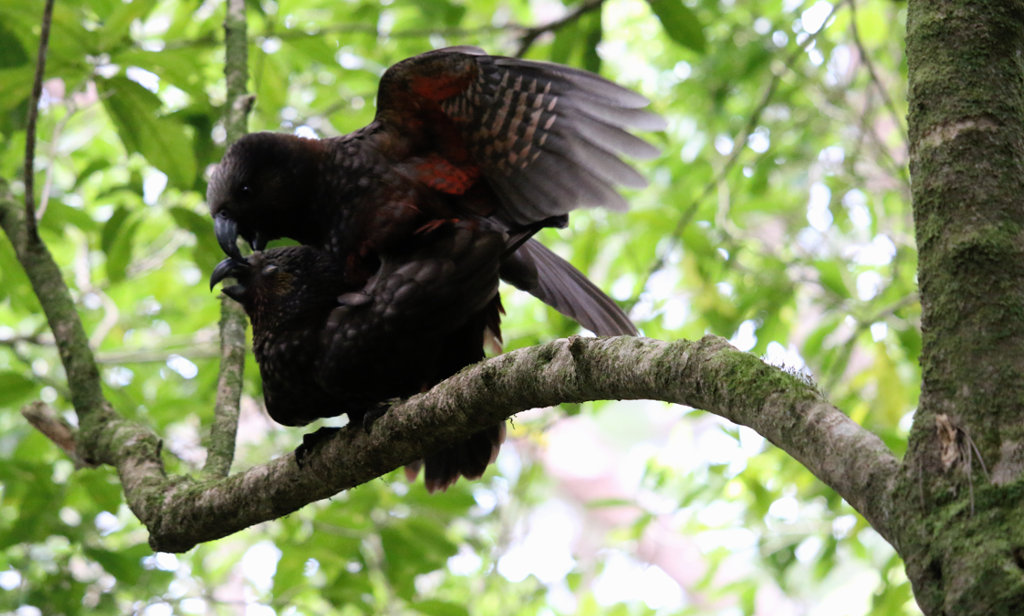
New Zealand kākā pairs mating

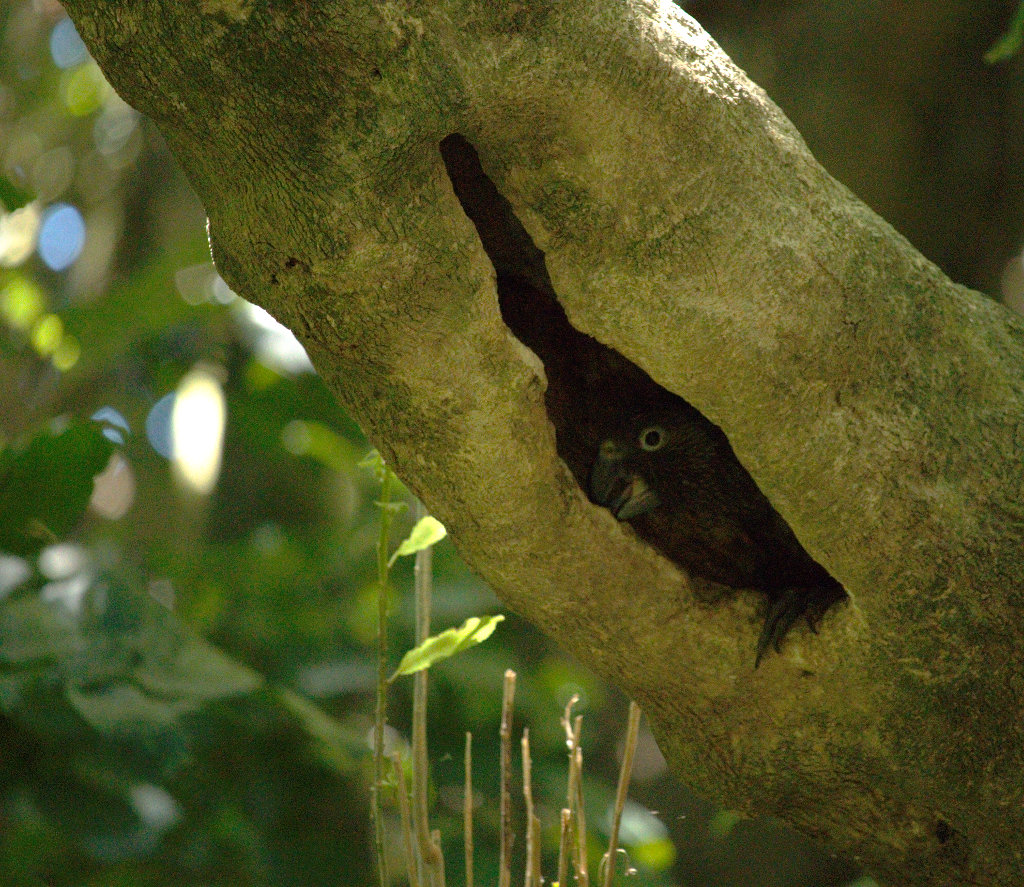
A kākā nest in a tree cavity. This is one of two fledglings in this nest, ready to go exploring though it cannot yet fly.

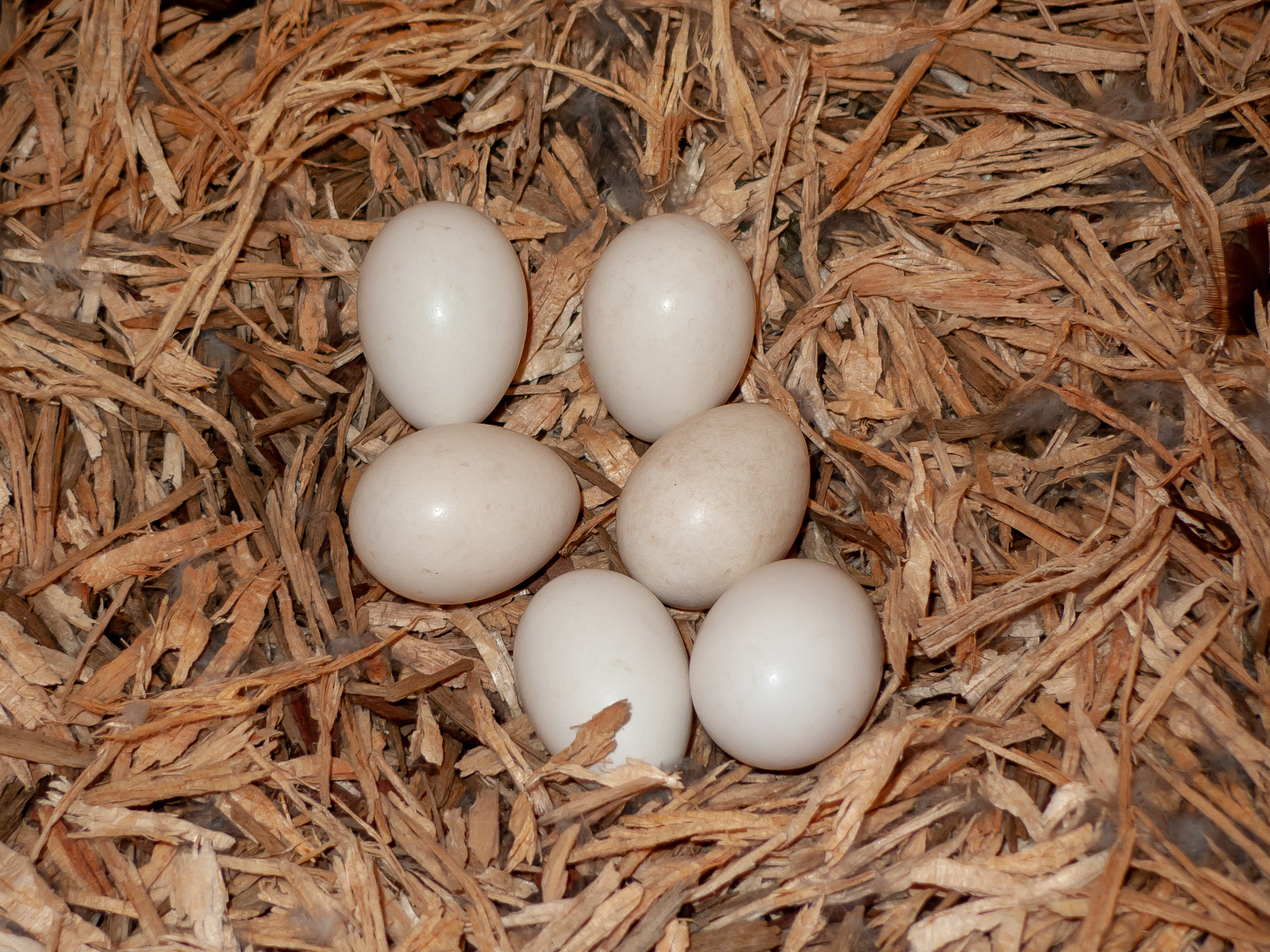
Eggs laid by a North Island kākā in a wooden nestbox at Zealandia wildlife sanctuary, Wellington

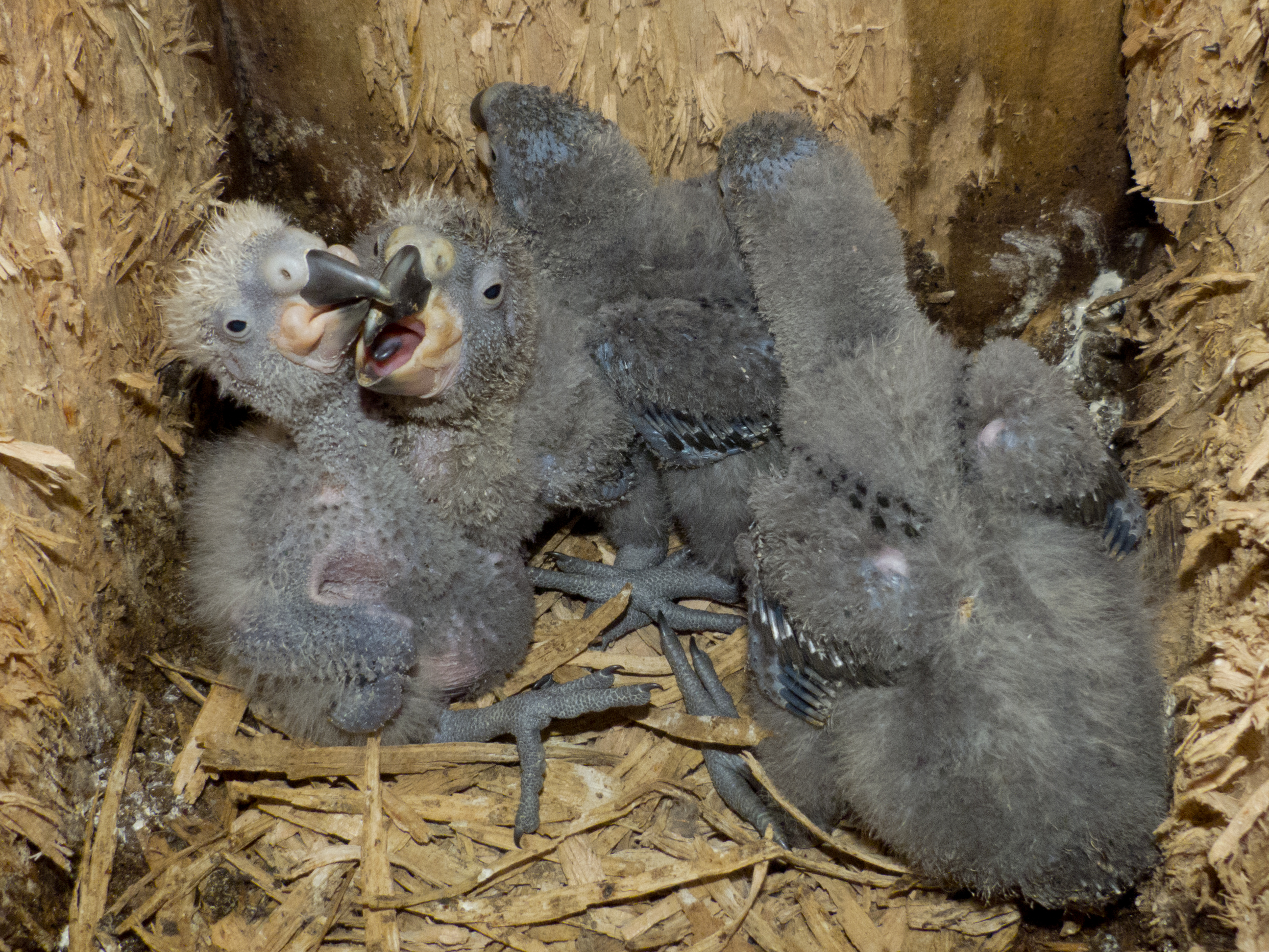
Four North Island kaka chicks, approximately 3 weeks old, in a nest box at Zealandia

The New Zealand kākā nests in cavities in hollow trees. These trees are often mataī, rimu, tōtara, miro, hīnau and sometimes dead trees. The entrance hole is often three to six metres above the ground, but can be as low as ground level on predator-free offshore islands. The nest floor is lined with small wood chips and powder. This is intentionally created by the mother stripping wood and chewing wood chips from the cavity walls. Large wood chips on the cavity floor can be further chewed and broken down to create a consistent base for the nestlings. They lay eggs any time between September (late winter) and March (summer). Occasionally, in a good fruiting year, a pair can double clutch, often utilising the same nest hole for the second clutch and extending breeding into winter. They typically lay four eggs, though it can be up to eight, with two chicks fledging. Kākā eggs are white, slightly oval and have a rough surface. Only the female incubates the eggs, for about 24 days, and cares for the nestlings, but she is regularly fed by the male throughout breeding. Males feed the incubating female 8-12 times a day. Kākā nestlings leave the nest when approximately 70 days old, with nestlings as old as 11–20 days being left unattended for 20–70% of the night and 50–85% of the day. Both parents feed the chicks after they have fledged.

=== Breeding behaviour ===
The kākā is a monogamous species that tends to breed in pairs; however, extra-pair copulations, while not common, do occur in kākā. Monogamous pairs often return to breed with each other year after year. Kākā courtship involves the male approaching a female, often on a branch in the canopy. Before mating, the male kākā gently pushes the female with his foot, forehead and beak, then moves away. If the female remains in the same position after this and lowers her head, the male will mount the female and mate. However, if the female leaves after the male's courtship display, mating will likely not occur. Kākā tend to form groups for feeding and mating. In these groups, during the breeding season, males can be protective of their mates and have been observed driving away other species of birds and other kākā from their mates. However, outside of this, kākā are not highly territorial, with nests sometimes being as close as 30m apart during the breeding season.

=== Social play behaviour ===
Social play is a behaviour that has been observed in fledgling and juvenile kākā. Kākā social play can be defined as two individuals interacting and responding to each other and exchanging information. Social play in kākā often occurs when two individuals repeat behaviours demonstrated by one another until one is distracted by other stimuli. Play behaviour within parrots demonstrates complex cognition and an evolutionary history of living in social groups. Social play in kākā evolved early on in their evolutionary history. It likely evolved to help cognitive development and social bonding, with social play helping kākā develop problem-solving skills and learn social cues, which is important for kākā when in groups. Social play and other social interactions make up a significant portion of juvenile kākā's activities. Common social play behaviours observed in kākā are play chasing, play invitations, play fighting, and sometimes social object play. Social object play is rare in kākā but still occasionally occurs, with kākā sometimes grasping tree fronds or branches with their bill while playing.

A play behaviour seen in juvenile kākā is play invitations. Play invitations are defined as the behaviour that initiates play between two kākā. This behaviour in kākā can be recognised as a distinctive hopping approach to a potential play partner as well as head cocking. A head cock occurs when a kākā turns its head to one side while approaching another kākā. These are both common signals juvenile kākā perform to initiate play with conspecifics. This behaviour is often followed by play chasing or play fighting. Play chasing often occurs when one kākā chases another on the ground or during flight; the roles often reverse between the individuals.

Playfighting often does not cause injury, and aggressiveness is limited. Kākā frequently engage in play fights, often resulting in one kākā rolling onto its back and the other jumping onto its stomach with non-aggressive bite attempts and foot pushes. With this behaviour, there is often no attempt to cause injury to the partner during the play fight. After this interaction, they reverse positions and repeat the play fight, ending similarly. Behaviours that show play fighting can be foot pushing when a kākā stands on or nudges another kākā with its feet. Other behaviours are bill locking which does not occur as often in kākā play and is more prevalent in kea social play.

=== Feeding ===
New Zealand kākā pair feeding each other via regurgitation

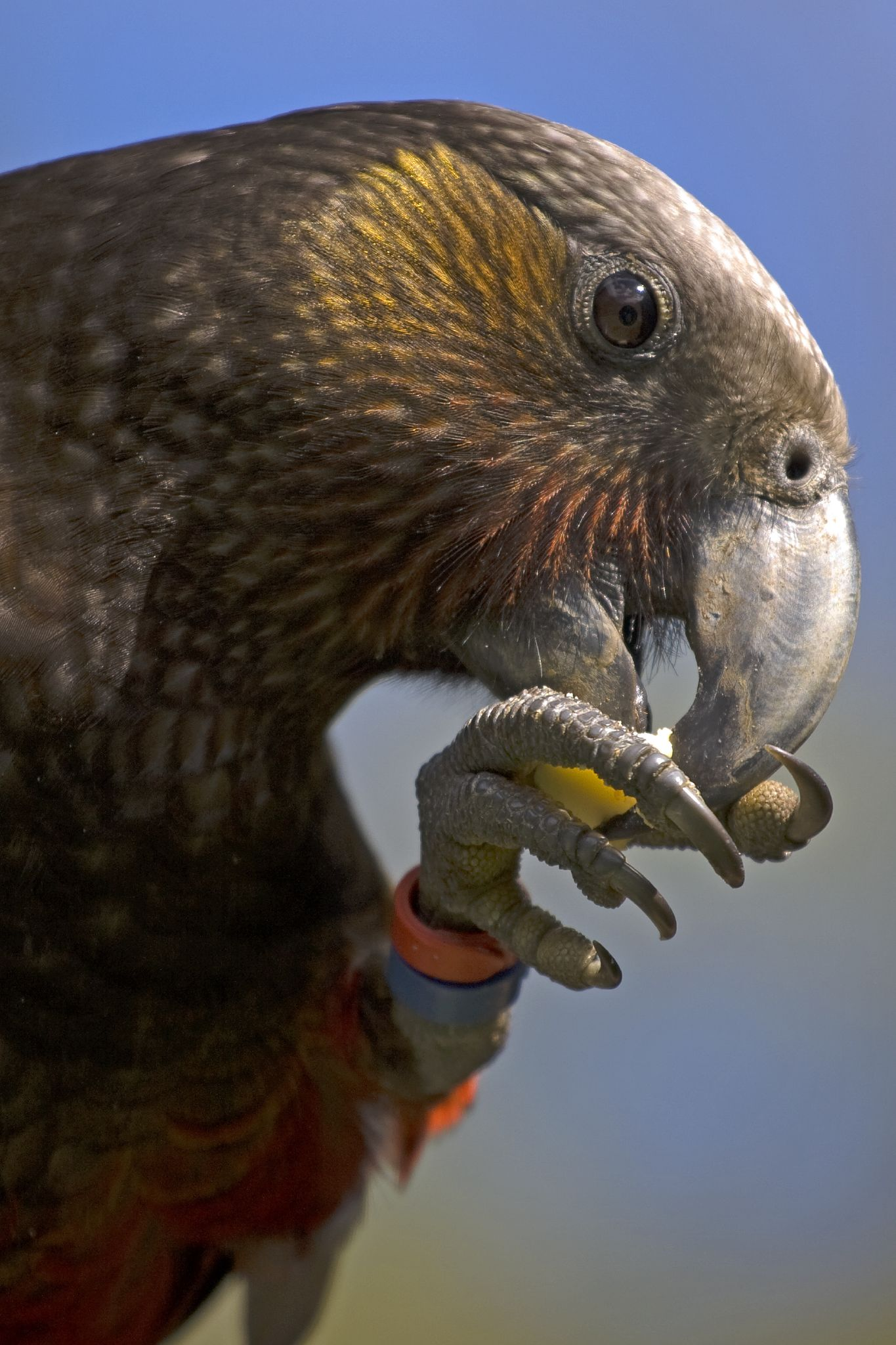
The kākā, like many parrots, uses its feet to hold its food

New Zealand kākā typically feed on varieties of fruits, berries, seeds, flowers, buds, nectar, sap, plants and invertebrates. They use their strong beaks to shred cones of kauri trees to obtain the seeds. It has a brush tongue with which it uses to feeds on nectar, and it uses its strong beak to dig out the grubs of the huhu beetle and to remove bark to feed on sap. They consume nectar from plant species such as kōwhai, flax, rātā, and pōhutukawa. Kākā, while feeding, often stand on one foot and use the other foot to manipulate food, like stripping the husk off of a fruit. This is a behaviour demonstrated in many other parrot species. Kākā feeding behaviour often varies depending on the season, with kākā switching to different resources based on seasonal availability. Kākā tend to consume more seeds, berries, and fruit when nectar and honeydew are low in winter, with their diet varying throughout the year and shifting focus during different seasons.

==== Sap feeding ====
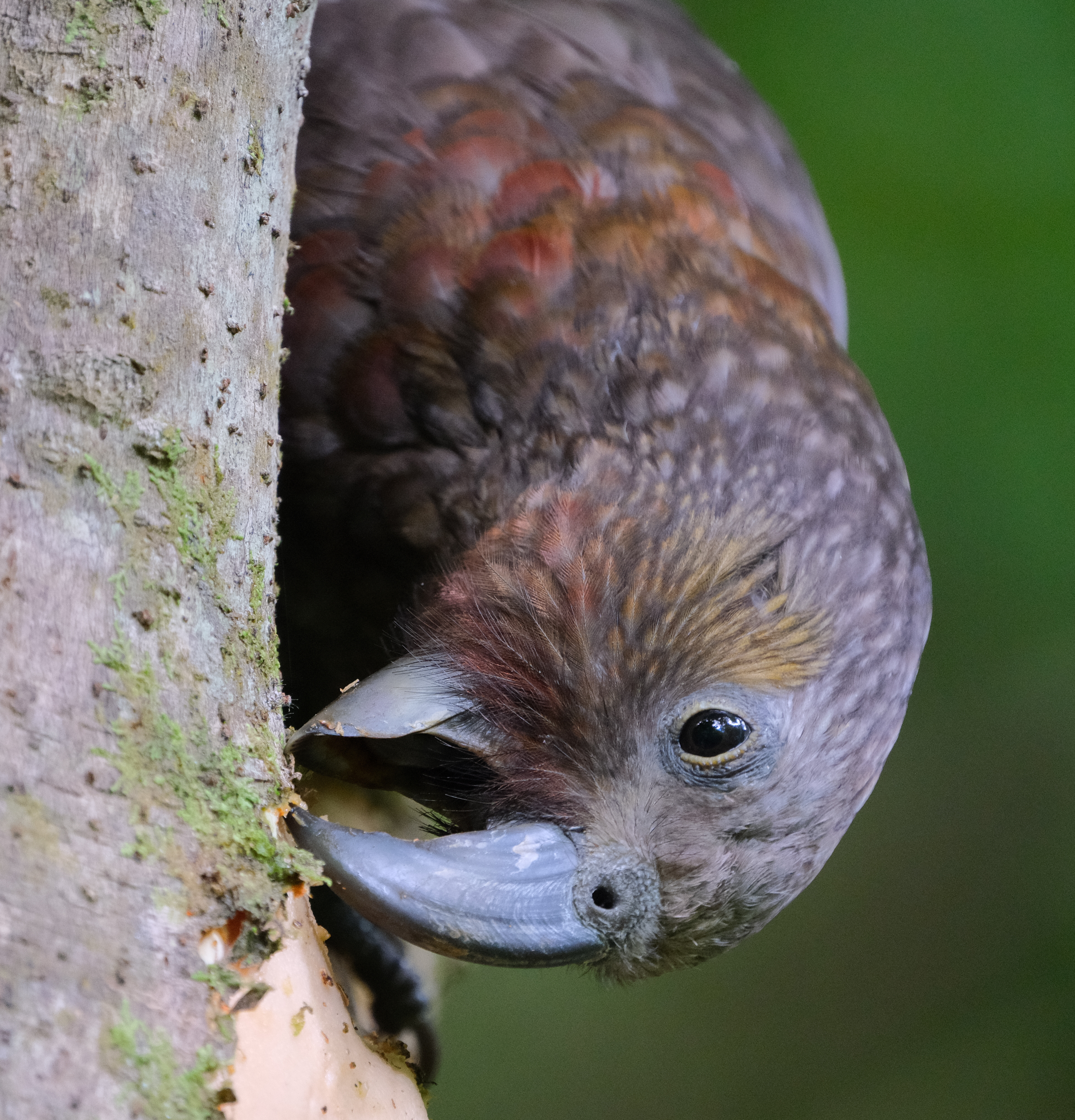
A kākā, using its beak to strip the bark from a tree

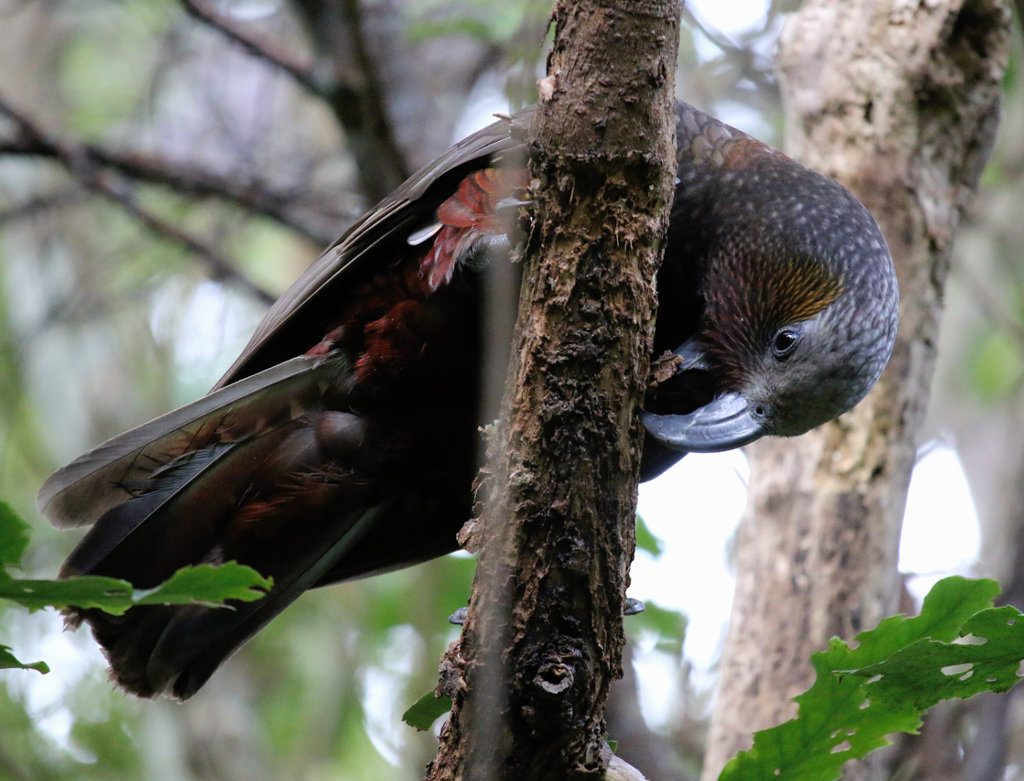
A kākā drilling into a branch to extract sap or an insect

A common feeding behaviour frequently observed in kākā is sap feeding behaviour. Sap feeding behaviour occurs most in mid to late winter and spring when there is a scarcity of flowers and other food sources which are prevalent during the summer months. This behaviour is evident by the removal of bark from trees in areas populated by kākā. There are two types of bark removal strategies used by kākā. Firstly, there are transverse gouges made by the kākā's beak and are intended to break through the bark layer in a deep gouge, allowing the kākā to access the tree sap by lapping at the cut in the tree. These often appear on trees as small, long linear gouges wrapping around the branch or trunk of the tree. The second strategy is the removal of bark patches by scraping away layers of bark rather than gouging at it to reach the sap. This is evident on trees with larger damage and flatter, more broad bark removal compared to the sharp linear cuts of transverse gouges. Kākā have also been observed pulling bark from invasive pine trees (Pinus radiata) and native tree species like kauri. Sap feeding behaviour appears to be an important resource for kākā in many regions across New Zealand and for all individuals in kākā populations. It is likely a supplementary food for females before breeding but is also an important supplement to male kākā and kākā of all ages. Tree sap is a high-energy food source that can help kākā meet their energy requirements. Feeding observations were recorded in six kākā in a study of North Island kākā in pine tree (Pinus radiata) plantations, where it was found that 24% of their diet was made up of tree sap. This is an example of a specific North Island population that relied more on tree sap than other kākā populations. However, with reintroduced populations of kākā in Wellington, tree damage from kākā accessing tree sap has become more commonplace throughout the city. The behaviour also shows the kākā's high intelligence as often kākā, before sap feeding, test various points of a tree, looking for ideal locations like weak spots to begin removing bark.

==== Honeydew and nectar-feeding ====
Like tree sap, kākā feed on honeydew and nectar to access high-energy food sources to meet their energy requirements. Kākā have evolved a narrow and fimbriated tongue to lap up sap, honeydew and nectar. This adaptation of having a tongue covered in small hair-like structures help kākā utilise sap, honeydew and nectar; it is most pronounced in kākā compared to kea and kākāpō. Flower nectar makes up a large proportion of kākā's diet during the summer months when more flowers are in bloom. They use their bristle tongues to access the nectar within flowers and often use their foot to pull the flower closer or pull it off to access the nectar. Kākā also frequently utilise honeydew. This is another high-energy resource created by scale insects that kākā utilise in a similar way to sap and nectar, using their bristle tongues to lap up the honeydew.

==== Insect larvae foraging ====
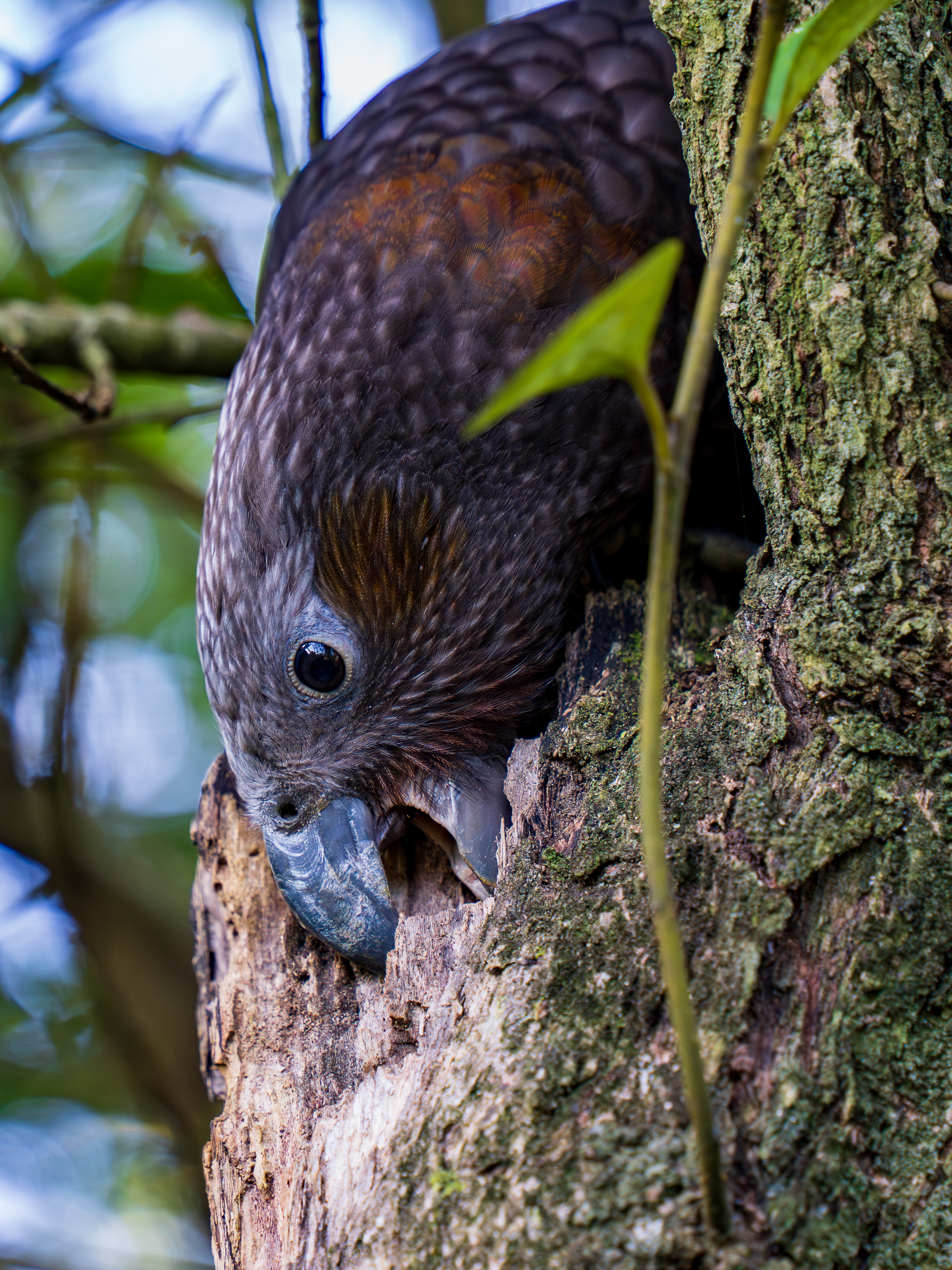
A kākā boring into a tree

A proportion of the kākā diet is made up of invertebrates, particularly wood-boring beetles. A significant part of the behaviour and diet of some populations of kākā is boring into trees to dig insect larvae out like huhu beetle and kanuka longhorn beetle (Ochrocydus huttoni) larvae. North Island kākā tend to forage for the huhu beetle larvae, and the South Island kākā tend to feed on the kanuka longhorn beetle larvae as well as huhu beetle larvae. They have been observed for up to two hours in the same location, trying to remove one larva. Kākā often locate where larvae are in trees by seeing the damage on the side of the tree caused by the boring insect. However, it has been shown that often, kākā can expend more energy trying to access the invertebrate larvae in the tree cavity than what they gain from consuming the larvae. This behaviour is suggested as a substitute feeding method when other resources are less available, such as fruit, berries, and nectar. The behaviour also tends to occur more often in males, potentially due to their larger beak size compared to females.

== Conservation status ==
New Zealand kākā are considered vulnerable, having greatly declined across their traditional range as a result of habitat loss, predation by introduced predators such as cats, rats, possums and stoats, and competition from wasps and bees for the honeydew excreted by scale insects. A closely related species, Nestor productus, the Norfolk kākā, became extinct in 1851 for similar reasons. New Zealand kākā are absolutely protected under New Zealand's Wildlife Act 1953. The species is also listed under Appendix II of the Convention on International Trade in Endangered Species of Wild Fauna and Flora (CITES) meaning international export/import (including parts and derivatives) is regulated. Under the New Zealand Threat Classification System (NZTCS), the North Island kaka is considered to be "At Risk", but with an increasing population, while the South Island kaka is considered "Threatened" and "Nationally Vulnerable".

=== Predation ===
As cavity nesters with a long incubation period that requires the mother to stay on the nest for at least 90 days, New Zealand kākā are particularly vulnerable to predation. Stoats were the main cause of death of nesting adult females, nestlings and fledglings, but possums were also important predators of adult females, eggs and nestlings. There is strong evidence that predation of chicks and females has led to a serious age and sex imbalance, even amongst ostensibly healthy populations.

In parts of the country, the Department of Conservation and local conservation groups have attempted to control predators of New Zealand kākā through the use of traps, ground baiting and the aerial deployment of sodium fluoroacetate (1080). Where pest control has been carried out, there has been a significant recovery of New Zealand kākā populations. For example, in Pureora Forest Park 20 kākā were radio-tracked in an area to be treated with aerial 1080 in 2001. In nearby Waimanoa Forest, which was not to be treated with 1080, nine kākā were radio-tracked. In the area where 1080 was used, all 20 birds survived that season. Of the nine birds tagged in the untreated area, five were killed by predators that same season.

=== Competition ===
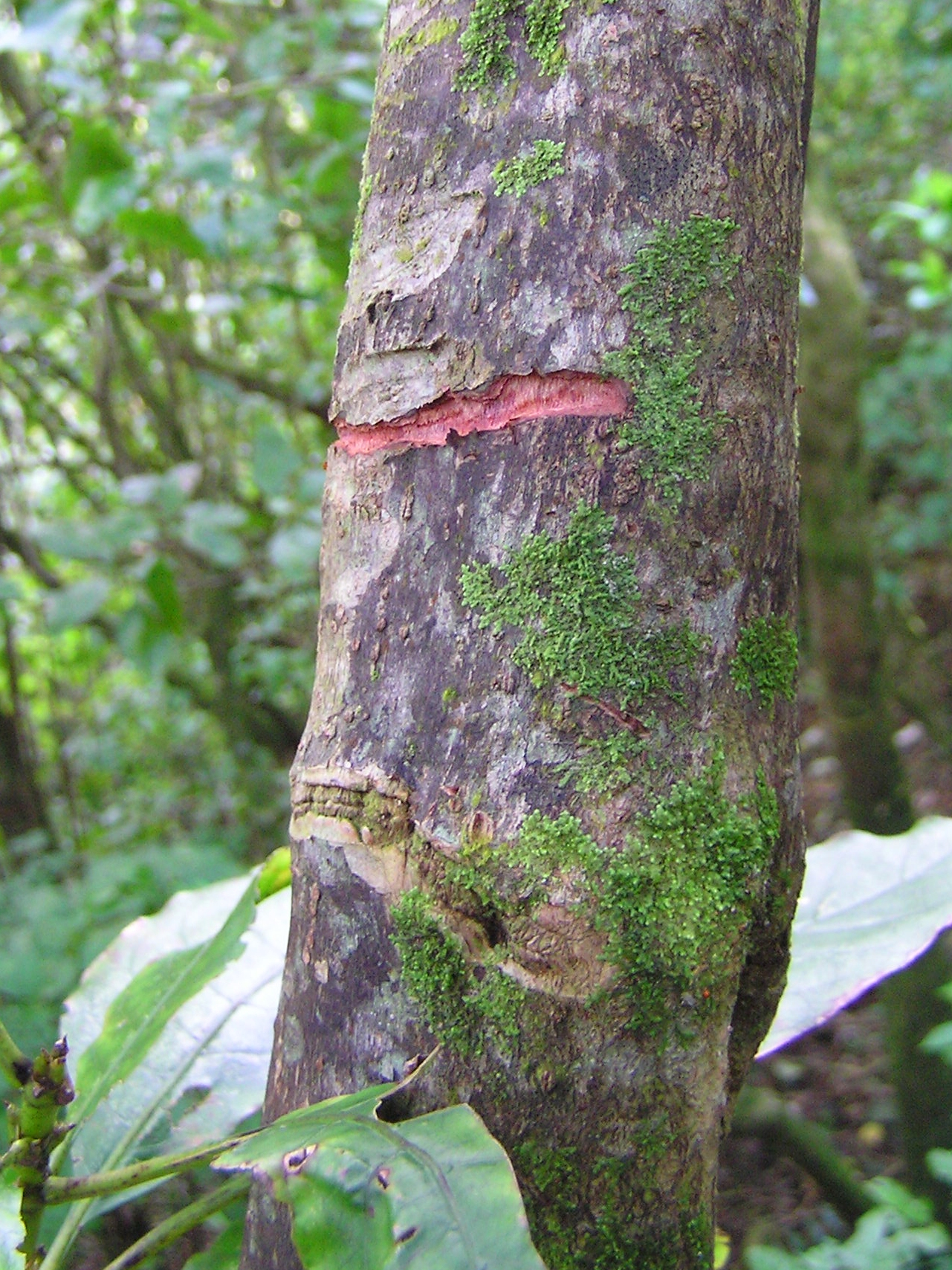
Scars on a tree, where kākā have created a gouge to feed on sap

Research has shown that honeydew is very important for breeding New Zealand kākā, especially for those breeding in southern beech forests. The difficult nature of controlling wasps makes the future of the New Zealand kākā very uncertain.

Competition has also been observed over gouges in trees created by kākā to access tree sap. This occurs when another kākā approaches a sap-feeding kākā and displaces it from the tree wound it was sap-feeding at. On occasion, tūī can compete with kākā over tree wounds, with kākā sometimes chasing tūī away from particular tree wounds where they are accessing tree sap. Kākā also sometimes show aggressive behaviour to other kākā, particularly during the breeding season. This includes threat displays such as raising the wings and facing the other bird while performing a loud call.

== Māori culture ==
The kākā is a taonga species recognised as a species of high cultural significance in New Zealand. The kākā plays a significant part in Māori mythology, with it often being seen as a symbol of power, authority, and prestige. The kākā also has a personified parent named Tū Mātāika with a Māori proverb about the kākā describing the great number of descendants of Tū Mātāika. This refers to the once great abundance of kākā across New Zealand. Kākā pōria, which are small rings made from bone, pounamu, and other stones, were used to keep kākā as mōkai (captives or pets). They were usually captured as nestlings and grew tame as they progressed into adulthood.

== Human interaction ==
Re-introduction of North Island kākā at Zealandia in Wellington, combined with conservation efforts, has led to a large increase in the population of the birds in the city. Many kākā visit residential gardens and reserves, and this in turn has led to more interactions with people. People have been feeding the birds unsuitable food such as nuts, various grains and cheese. Feeding kākā has resulted in metabolic bone disease in kākā chicks. In 2016 80% of the kākā chicks being monitored by the Wellington City Council died from this disease. There have also been instances of kākā nesting in the roofs of houses. This interaction in Wellington has caused minor damage to outdoor furniture, buildings and trees. Property damage also occurred in areas closer to kākā sanctuaries like Zealandia, creating negative attitudes and divided opinions on feeding wild kākā in residential areas, especially between neighbours who do and do not feed kākā. However, most people report positive attitudes to the reintroduction of kākā in Wellington.
