= Kodamaea kakaduensis =

Scientific classification
- Kingdom: Fungi
- Division: Ascomycota
- Class: Pichiomycetes
- Order: Serinales
- Family: Debaryomycetaceae
- Genus: Kodamaea
- Species: K. kakaduensis

Binomial name
- Kodamaea kakaduensis Lachance et al. 1999

Species of fungus

Kodamaea kakaduensis is an ascomycetous yeast species first isolated from Australian Hibiscus flowers. It is heterothallic, haploid, similar to other Kodamaea species and to Candida restingae. Its buds are often produced on short protuberances, and a true mycelium is formed. It differs from other species by the assimilation of trehalose, melezitose, and xylitol, and is reproductively isolated. Its type strain is UWO (PS) 98–119.2.
