= D-arabitol-phosphate dehydrogenase =

Identifiers
- EC no.: 1.1.1.301

Databases
- IntEnz: IntEnz view
- BRENDA: BRENDA entry
- ExPASy: NiceZyme view
- KEGG: KEGG entry
- MetaCyc: metabolic pathway
- PRIAM: profile
- PDB structures: RCSB PDB PDBe PDBsum
Search
- PMC: articles
- PubMed: articles
- NCBI: proteins

D-arabitol-phosphate dehydrogenase (EC 1.1.1.301, APDH, D-arabitol 1-phosphate dehydrogenase, D-arabitol 5-phosphate dehydrogenase) is an enzyme with systematic name D-arabitol-phosphate:NAD^{+} oxidoreductase. This enzyme catalyses the following chemical reaction:

D-arabinitol 1-phosphate
+ NAD^{+}
H^{+}
H^{+}
(D-xylulose-5-phosphoric acid
+ NADH

This enzyme participates in arabitol catabolism. The enzyme also converts D-arabitol 5-phosphate to D-ribulose 5-phosphate at a lower rate.
