= Scheffersomyces stipitis =

Scientific classification
- Kingdom: Fungi
- Division: Ascomycota
- Class: Pichiomycetes
- Order: Serinales
- Family: Debaryomycetaceae
- Genus: Scheffersomyces
- Species: S. stipitis

Binomial name
- Scheffersomyces stipitis (Pignal) Kurtzman & M. Suzuki (2010)

Synonyms
- Pichia stipitis Pignal (1967); Yamadazyma stipitis (Pignal) Billon-Grand (1989)

Species of fungus

Scheffersomyces stipitis (formerly Pichia stipitis) is a species of yeast, belonging to the "CUG Clade" of ascomycetous yeasts. This is a group of fungi that substitute serine for leucine when the CUG codon is encountered. S. stipitis is distantly related to brewer's yeast, Saccharomyces cerevisiae, which uses the conventional codon system. Found, among other places, in the guts of passalid beetles, S. stipitis is capable of both aerobic and oxygen limited fermentation, and has the highest known natural ability of any yeast to directly ferment xylose, converting it to ethanol, a potentially economically valuable trait. Xylose is a hemicellulosic sugar found in all angiosperm plants. As such xylose constitutes the second most abundant carbohydrate moiety in nature. Xylose can be produced from wood or agricultural residues through auto- or acid hydrolysis. Ethanol production from such lignocellulosic residues does not compete with food production through the consumption of grain.

Given the abundance of xylose and its potential for the bioconversion of lignocellulosic materials to renewable fuels, Scheffersomyces stipitis has been extensively studied. The complete sequencing of its genome was announced in 2007. Native strains of S. stipitis have been shown to produce ≈50 g/L ethanol in 48 h from pure xylose in defined minimal medium using urea as a nitrogen source. S. stipitis is a predominantly haploid yeast but strains can be induced to mate with themselves or with other strains of S. stipitis by cultivating cells on minimal medium containing limiting amounts of carbon sources and nitrogen. An extensive genetic toolbox has been developed for S. stipitis that includes synthetic drug resistance markers for nourseothricin acetyltransferase gene (nat1), hygromycin (hph) and a synthetic form of Cre that enables excision of the markers. Engineered strains of S. stipitis will produce 57 g/L ethanol from pure xylose in under 48 h and adapted strains will produce significant amounts of ethanol from acid hydrolysates of lignocellulose.

This natural ability of S. stipitis to ferment xylose to ethanol, has inspired efforts to engineer this trait into Saccharomyces cerevisiae. S. cerevisiae is preferred for ethanol production from grain and sugar cane, because it ferments hexose sugars very rapidly and is very robust. However, it does not natively metabolize xylose. This limits the usefulness of S. cerevisiae in the production of fuels and chemicals from plant cell walls, which contain a large amount of xylose. In response, S. cerevisiae has been engineered to ferment xylose through the addition of the S. stiptis genes, XYL1 and XYL2, coding for xylose reductase and xylitol dehydrogenase, respectively. The concerted action of these enzymes converts xylose to xylulose, which is naturally fermented by S. cerevisiae. Additional modifications are necessary for rapid fermentation of xylose, however.
