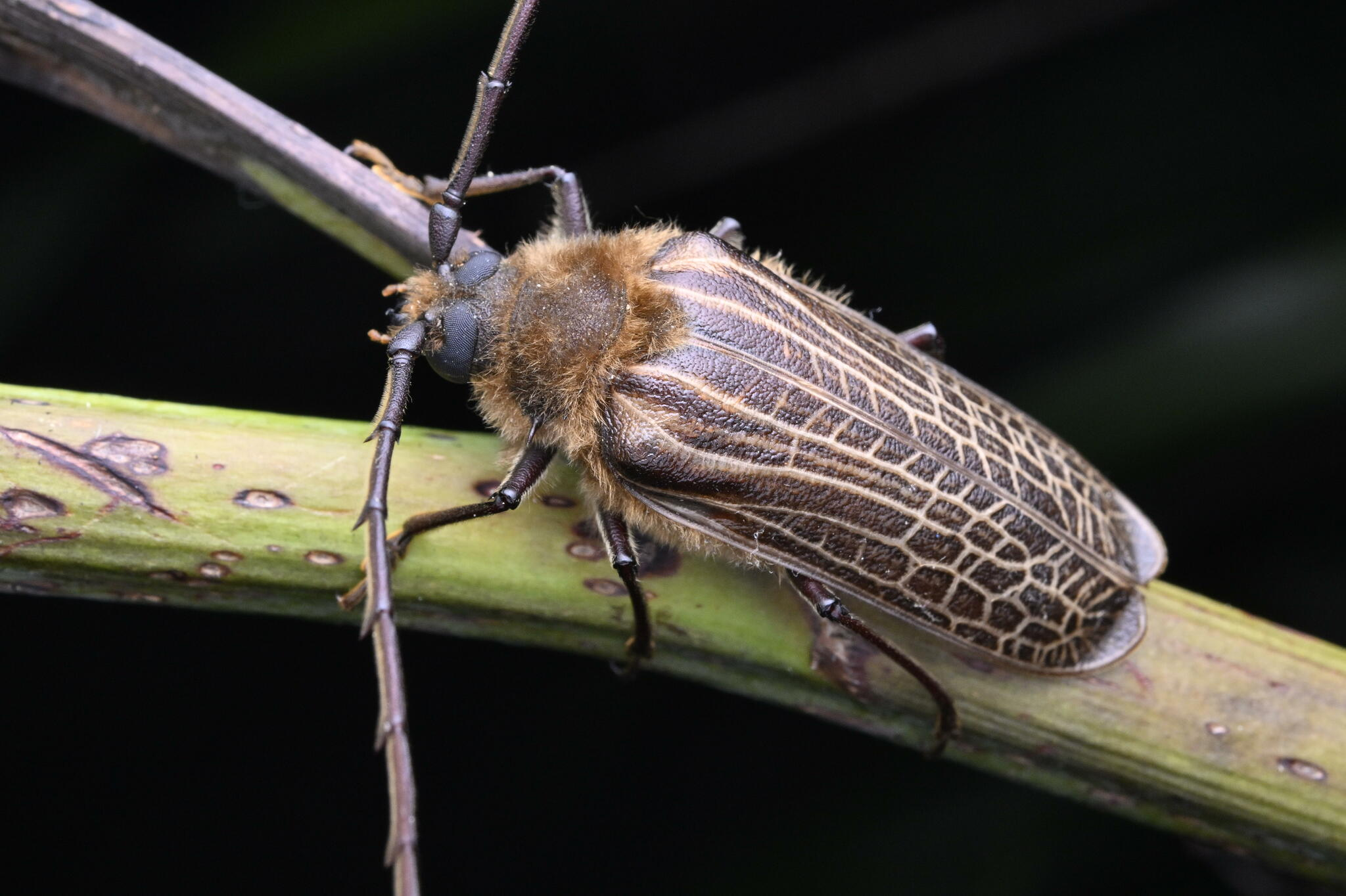
- A huhu beetle in Titirangi, Auckland

Scientific classification
- Kingdom: Animalia
- Phylum: Arthropoda
- Clade: Pancrustacea
- Class: Insecta
- Order: Coleoptera
- Suborder: Polyphaga
- Infraorder: Cucujiformia
- Family: Cerambycidae
- Subfamily: Prioninae
- Tribe: Rhipidocerini
- Genus: Prionoplus; White, 1843
- Species: P. reticularis

Binomial name
- Prionoplus reticularis White, 1843

= Huhu beetle =

Species of beetle

The huhu beetle (Prionoplus reticularis) is a longhorn beetle endemic to New Zealand. It is a large, visually distinctive species whose adults reach up to five cm (2 in) in length. It is widespread throughout New Zealand, occurring up to 1,400 m (4,600 ft) at altitude. Although the adult is unable to eat, the larva feeds and burrows in the dead wood of trees, almost entirely feeding on gymnosperms such as rimu and Monterey pine. As a larva, it can grow to sizes of 50–70 mm (2.0–2.8 in) and has a cylindrical appearance with a creamy colour. During this stage, in which the insect is high in protein and fat, it is edible and has been described as tasting similar to peanut butter. It has a history of consumption by the Māori, with the larva being consumed either raw or traditionally cooked in a hāngī.

The adult lives for roughly two weeks. It is nocturnal and is strongly attracted to light, such as that produced by human habitation. The female appears to produce olfactory cues to attract the male. During its larval stage, the beetle can potentially take one to two years to reach maturity, although this has been achieved more quickly in laboratory conditions. The intestinal tract of the larva hosts a diverse range of microorganisms that may assist in digestion of wood. Because the larva burrows into logs, New Zealand has to treat logs before exporting them to prevent the beetle spreading to other countries. This is done by fumigating or heating the logs, which is done by government-approved third parties. Many predators such as native birds and introduced mammals are known to prey upon the beetle. Prionaphes depressus, a species of fairy wasp exclusively parasitises the beetle's eggs. The beetle was first described in taxonomic literature in 1843 by Scottish zoologist Adam White from a specimen collected in the Bay of Islands.

== Taxonomy ==
The first specimen of huhu beetle to be used for taxonomic purposes was collected by British botanist Andrew Sinclair during a voyage in which he visited the Bay of Islands and went on expeditions alongside British botanists William Colenso and Joseph Dalton Hooker. The specimens he collected from this trip were donated to the British Museum (now Natural History Museum of London). From the material Sinclair collected, Scottish zoologist Adam White formally described the species in 1843. The type specimen (the specimen on which the species description is based) is stored in the Natural History Museum of London. The huhu beetle larva and pupa, the juvenile and pre-adult life stages, were later described by New Zealand entomologist Thomas Broun in 1880 and a brief description of their typical habits were given from samples collected from Parua Bay near Whangārei. Broun then produced a revised description of the species in his landmark Manual of the New Zealand Coleoptera publication in the same year.

=== Phylogeny ===
Rhipidocerini phylogeny

- - - - - Enneaphyllus rossi
        - Rhipidocerus australasiae
    - Enneaphyllus aeneipennis
  - Eboraphyllus middletoni
- Prionoplus reticularis

A 2023 study examined the phylogeny (evolutionary history) of Australian Rhipidocerini using genomic data produced by shotgun sequencing. The study placed Prionoplus in the Rhipidocerini, a tribe within the longhorn beetles, and positioned it as basal to all other Rhipidocerini species that were sequenced (all of which were Australian species), meaning it split off earlier than the other species that were studied.

== Etymology ==
The Māori name huhu is ultimately Austronesian in origin from the root form *bukbuk. Cognates, words in different languages derived from a common ancestor, in the more closely related Malayo-Polynesian languages (like Tagalog bukbok) refer to weevils that infest wood and rice across tropical Southeast Asia. In Māori, huhu has semantically evolved to also refer to its larval form (also tunga haere, tunga rākau). As the larva reaches maturity, it ceases to bore in wood and sheds its skin. This stage is known in Māori as tātaka. It then develops wings and legs, and while it is still white, it is known as pepe or pepe te muimui. Finally, it emerges and flies off to reproduce in its adult stage and is known as tunga rere.

== Description ==
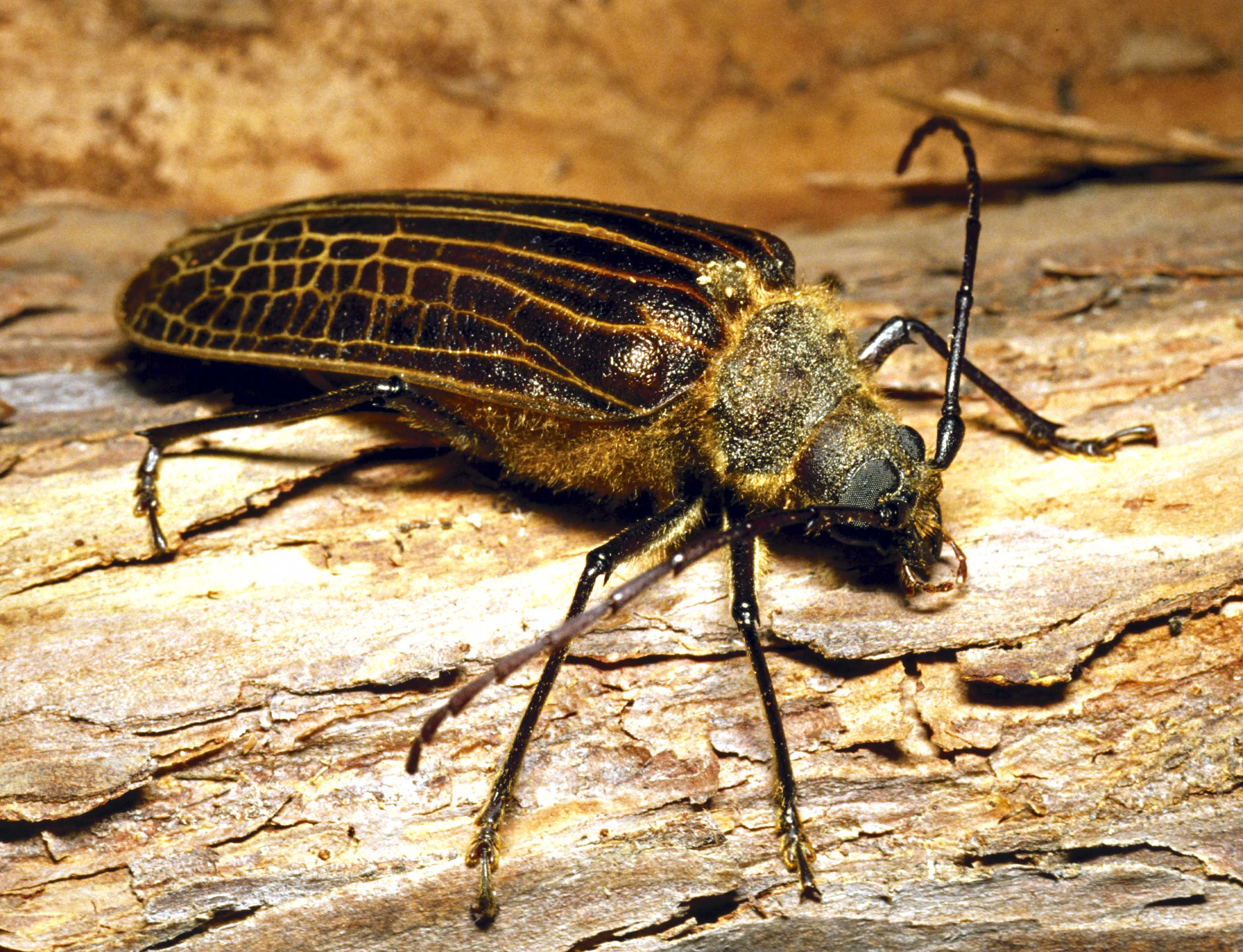
Adult

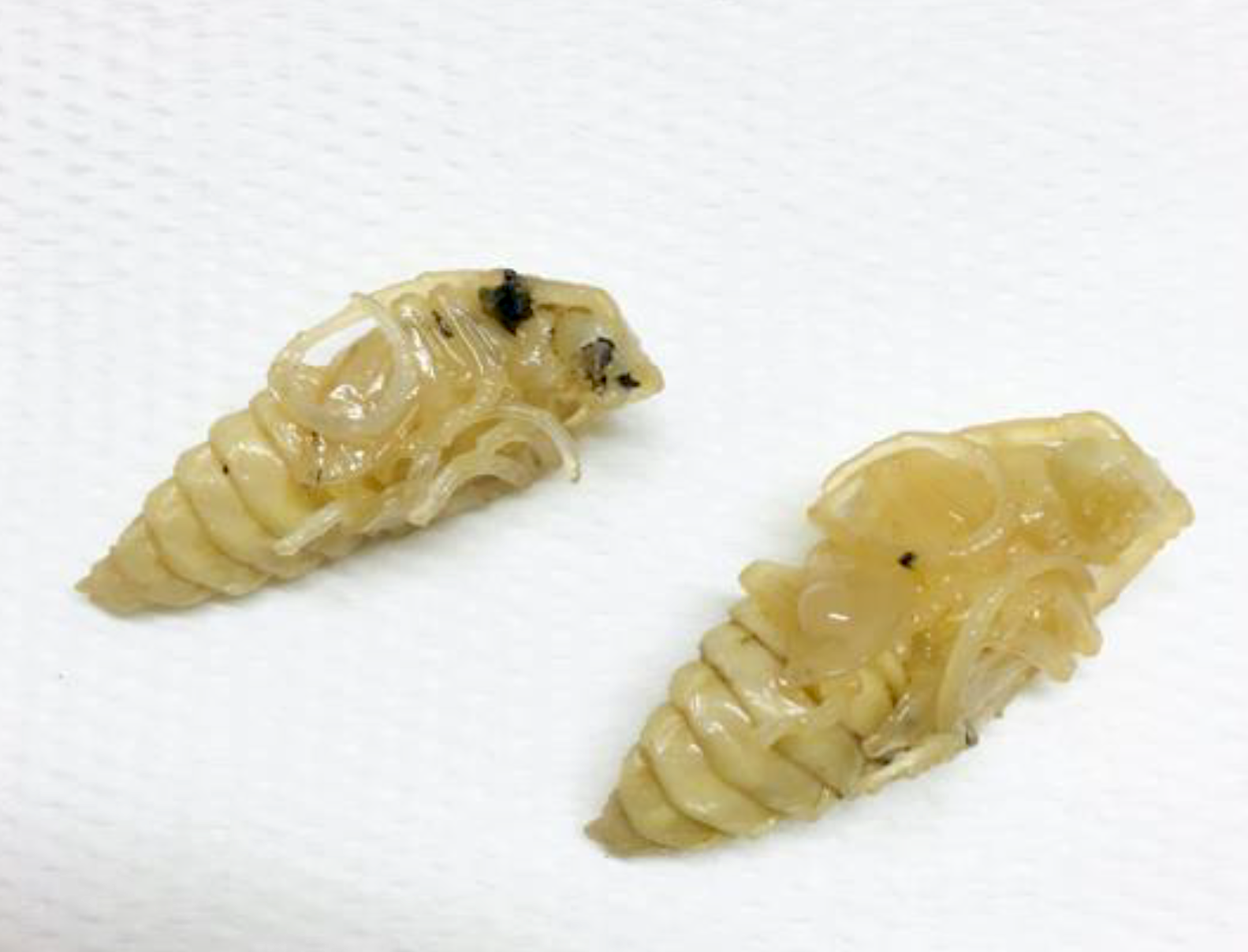
Pupae

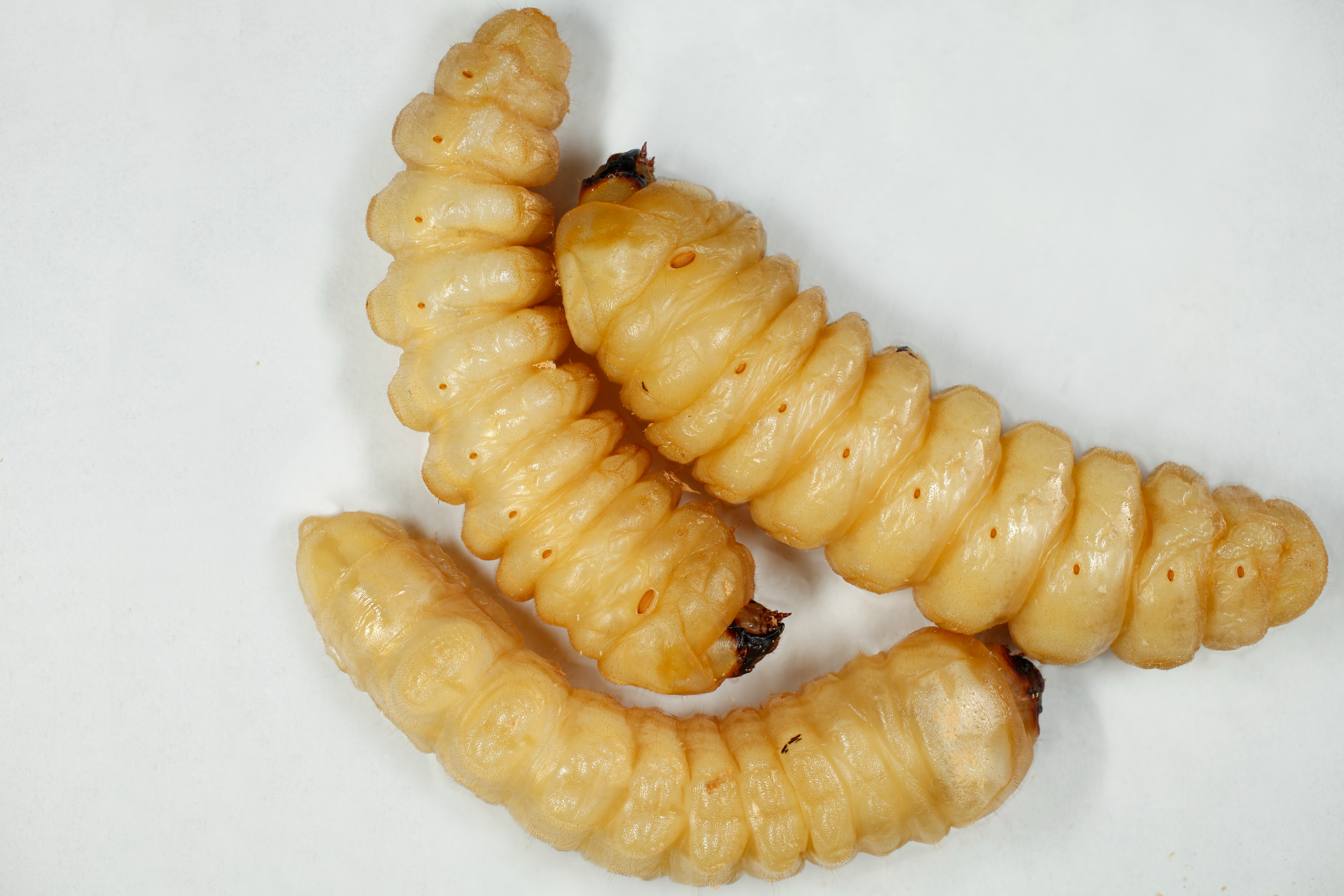
Larvae

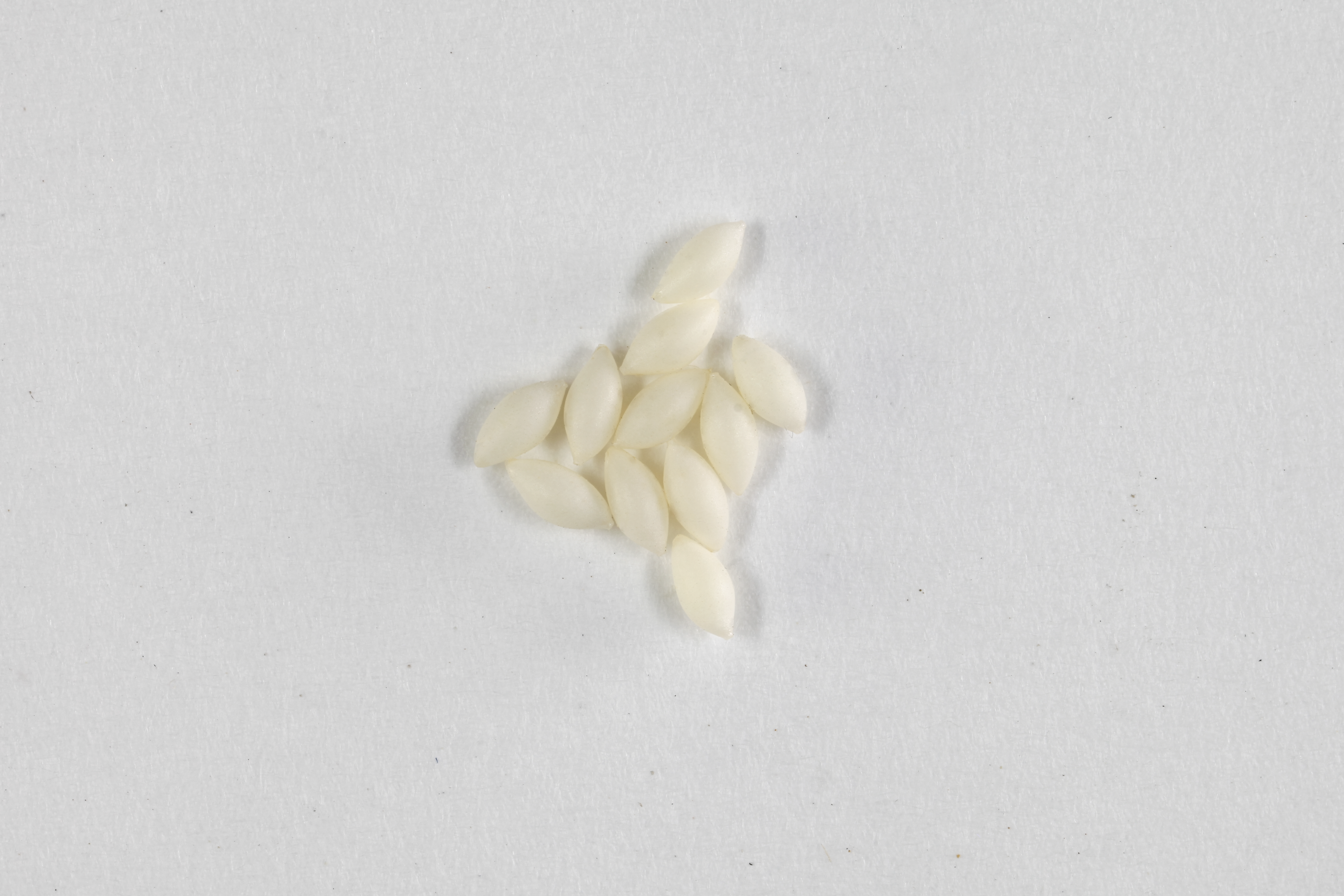
Eggs

=== Adult ===
The adult huhu beetle is unmistakable and easily identified by its large size (reaching around five cm [2 in] in length) and distinctive appearance. Overall, the whole body of the adult is a dark brown colour. The head and thorax have a thick layer of brown hair-like setae giving it a fuzzy appearance. As is typical of longhorn beetles, the antennae are long, extending around three quarters of the beetle's length. The mandibles are large and curved with a sharp end. Spines are present on the femur and tibia, the third and fourth segments of the legs. The elytra (hardened plates that cover the abdomen) are brown and have three pale yellow veins running down the length of the elytra with numerous cross veins forming a reticulated pattern. The male antennae are longer than the female's and also possess some sensilla (microscopic sensory organs) that are not present in female antennae. There is a single record of a female developing an extra pair of ovaries.

=== Pupa ===
The pupa is 35–40 mm (1.4–1.6 in) in length. The head and the pronotum (the main segment of the thorax), are covered in scattered setae, with the pronotum also having a small protuberance at its sides. The mesonotum and metanotum, the second and third segments of the thorax respectively, both have protuberances too, with the former having them in the middle of the segment's end, and the latter having them at the beginning of the segment. The first to eighth segments of the abdomen are covered in short hairs on the upper surface that gradually become more sparse in each consecutive segment. At the end of the abdomen there are two cone-shaped horns that are darkened at their tips.

=== Larva ===
The larva is very large, reaching up to 50–70 mm (2.0–2.8 in) in length before maturation. The mature larva is creamy white and has a robust cylinder shape. The larvae have a well-developed head capsule without any ocelli (simple light detecting organs) and with visible mandibles which are black and shiny. Attached to the head are the antennae, which have three joints. Each segment of the thorax and abdomen is covered in short setae, with the first to sixth abdominal segments having pleural discs (ray-like disc structures that are common in longhorn beetles). The spiracles, openings in the body used for respiration, of the abdomen are also large and easily visible. The first stage larva is identical to the mature larva except for the absence of triangular projections on a few spots of the head.

=== Egg ===
The egg is around three mm (0.12 in) in length and 1.2 mm (0.047 in) wide. It is white and is oval-shaped. The surface is smooth. It is covered in a clear secretion that sticks it to other eggs and substrate before hardening.

== Life cycle ==
The huhu beetle deposits clutches of 10–50 eggs (sometimes up to 100) in cracks and crevices in or under bark. One study has reported that it can lay 250–300 eggs. From eggs collected in the wild, 94–98% will hatch. In laboratory conditions of roughly 20 °C (68 °F) with a humidity of 75%, eggs hatched in 23 ± 2 days. Before hatching, the larva can be seen moving inside the egg and will break free from the egg using its mandibles to pierce the chorion of the egg and then enlarge the opening by chewing, although the chorion itself is not ingested. Setae that are found on the first to sixth abdominal segments assist in providing support as the larva leaves the egg and excavates the initial gallery (tunnel).

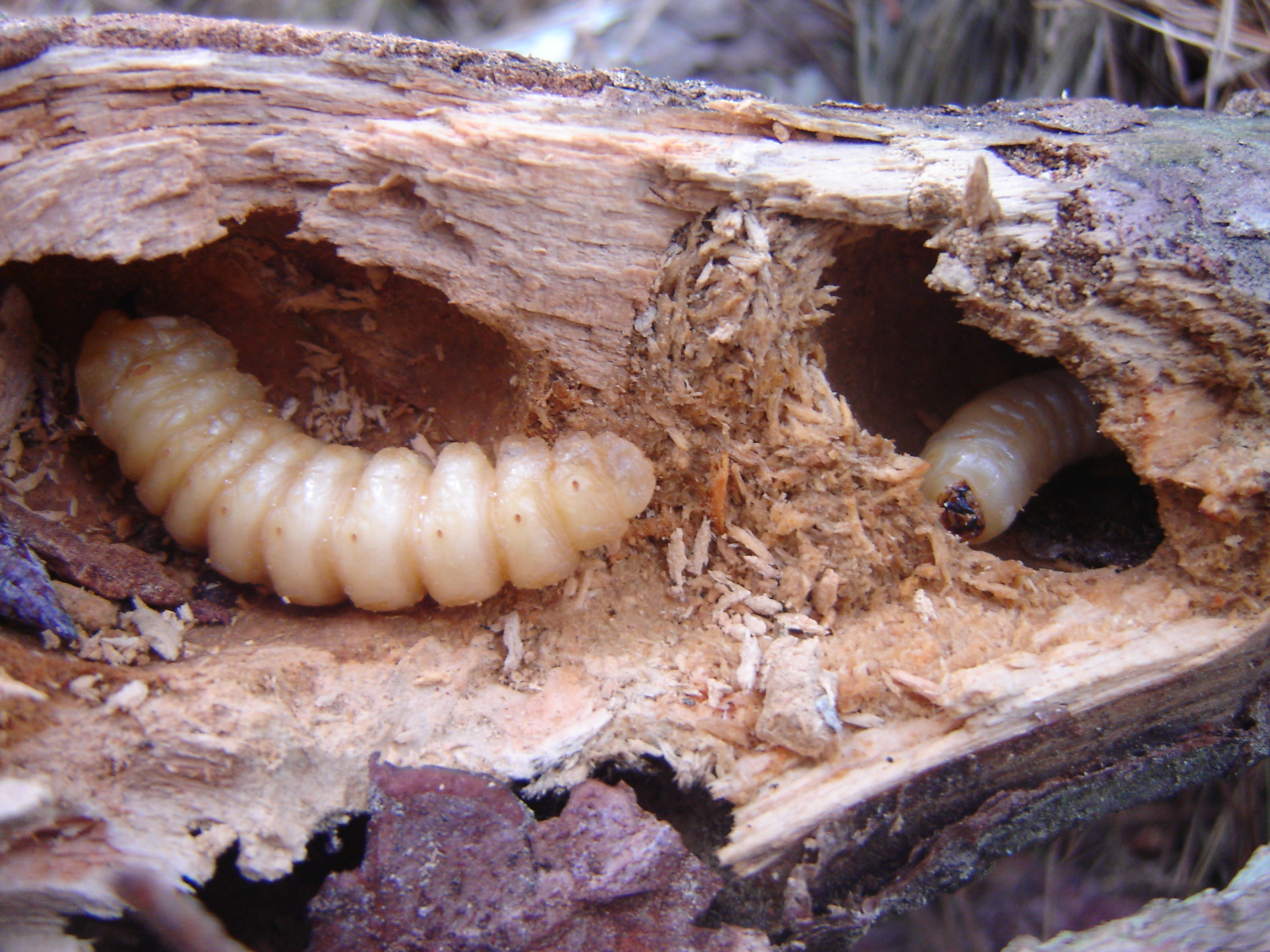
Huhu beetle larvae feeding on rotting wood

During the first instar (developmental stage), the larva burrows into logs and digs longitudinally along the wood's grain, where it makes a small chamber for its first moult. The larva, at various life stages, burrows into the logs, forming a series of galleries that vary in structure depending on the size and age of the log. In more freshly fallen logs, the galleries formed are fairly straight and do not go very deep. However, as the log rots and more larvae feed on the log, the galleries become deeper and more complex in nature, with the tunnels beginning to intersect with those of other larvae.

The larval stages last one to two years in the wild. Under laboratory conditions, the duration of this stage has been reduced to 250 days using an artificial diet and maintaining a temperature of 20 °C (68 °F).

In its final instar the larva moves to within 7.5–10 cm (3.0–3.9 in) of the surface of the wood before constructing a chamber for the pupal stage by enlarging the diameter of the normal gallery over a period of one to three days. This process creates fragments of wood similar to wood shavings about three by one centimetre (1.18 in × 0.39 in) in size which are then packed into the larval gallery to form a plug. Once the plug is completed the larva lines the walls of the chamber with the last frass (excretions) voided from its gut. The larva then undergoes a resting period of around ten to fifteen days when the abdominal segments contract and the body darkens slightly whereupon it moults into a pupa. The pupal phase lasts around 25 days.

Eclosion (when the adult emerges from its pupal stage) occurs with a series of ruptures along the head and thorax. The head, legs and wings are freed during arching movements of the body through the ruptured cuticle. The emerged adult may then enter an inactive period of three to five days prior to creating an exit tunnel out of the pupal cavity. The adults are incapable of feeding and live for roughly two weeks. As adults, the species has a roughly equal sex ratio.

== Hosts ==
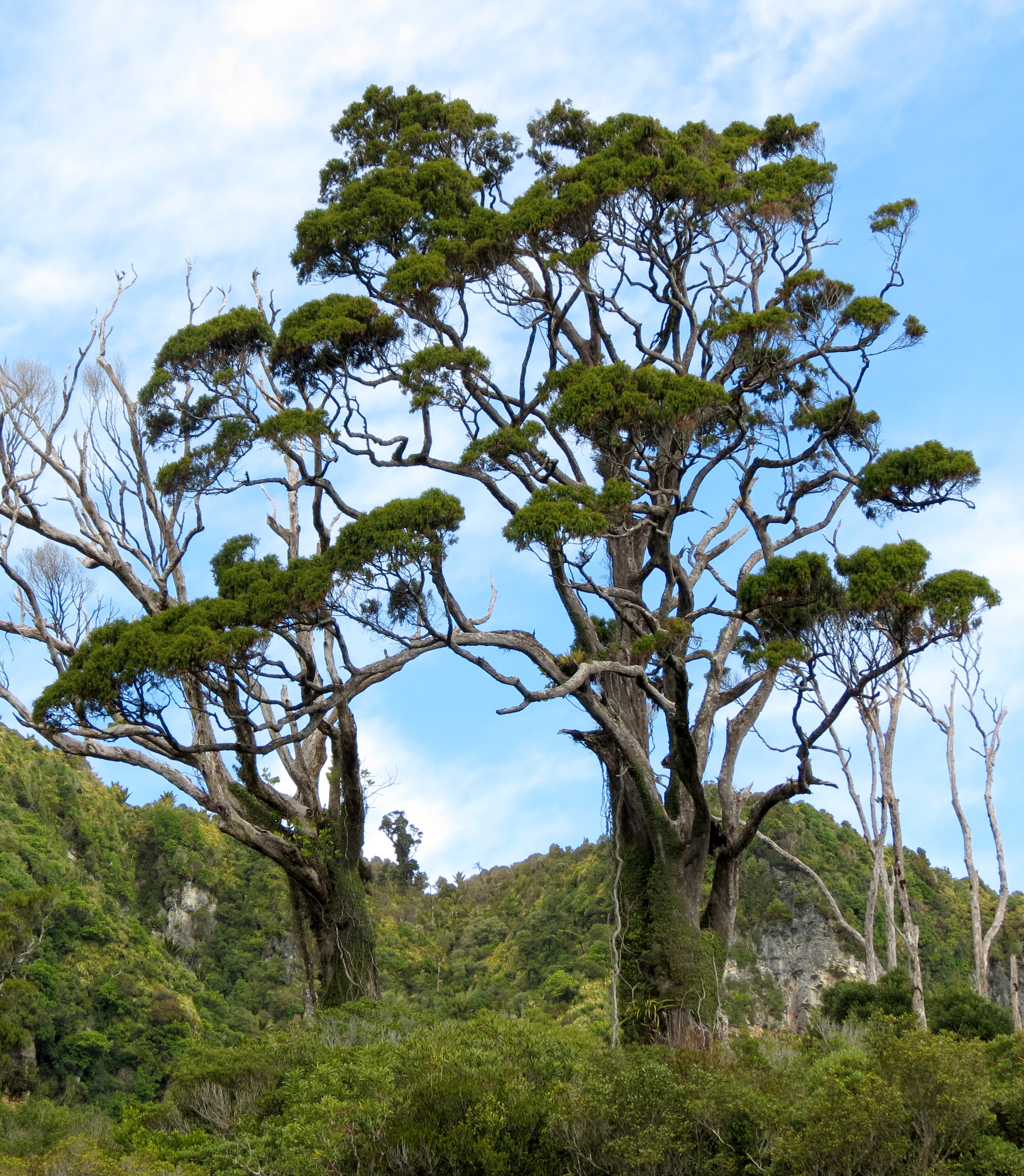
Rimu, one of the hosts of the huhu beetle larva

The larva lives and feeds on the dead wood of gymnosperms. There are fourteen gymnosperm species that are known to act as hosts of the larva. Additionally, there are also two host records of the larva living in tawa and oak, which are angiosperms. However, the latter record is likely a misidentification.

Known gymnosperm hosts of huhu beetle larvae:

- Kauri
- Miro
- Mataī
- Kahikatea
- Rimu
- Yellow silver pine
- Larch (exotic to New Zealand)
- Oregon pine (exotic to New Zealand)
- Monterey cypress (exotic to New Zealand)
- Pinus spp (exotic to New Zealand), including

- Monterey pine
- Loblolly pine
- Black pine
- Maritime pine

== Distribution and habitat ==
The huhu beetle is endemic to New Zealand where it is widespread throughout the main islands, occurring from sea level up to altitudes of 1,400 m (4,600 ft). There is a single record of a huhu beetle caught in the Kermadecs on Raoul Island. Visiting researchers have searched rotting wood for signs of huhu beetle larvae, but none were found, indicating that it has not established on the island. Because of this, it has been assumed that the specimen was from untreated wood brought to the island and used for construction. Before Europeans settled in New Zealand, the beetle was mainly associated with podocarp (trees from the Podocarpaceae group) and kauri tree forests, but has subsequently spread more widely due to the introduction of exotic conifers.

== Behaviour ==
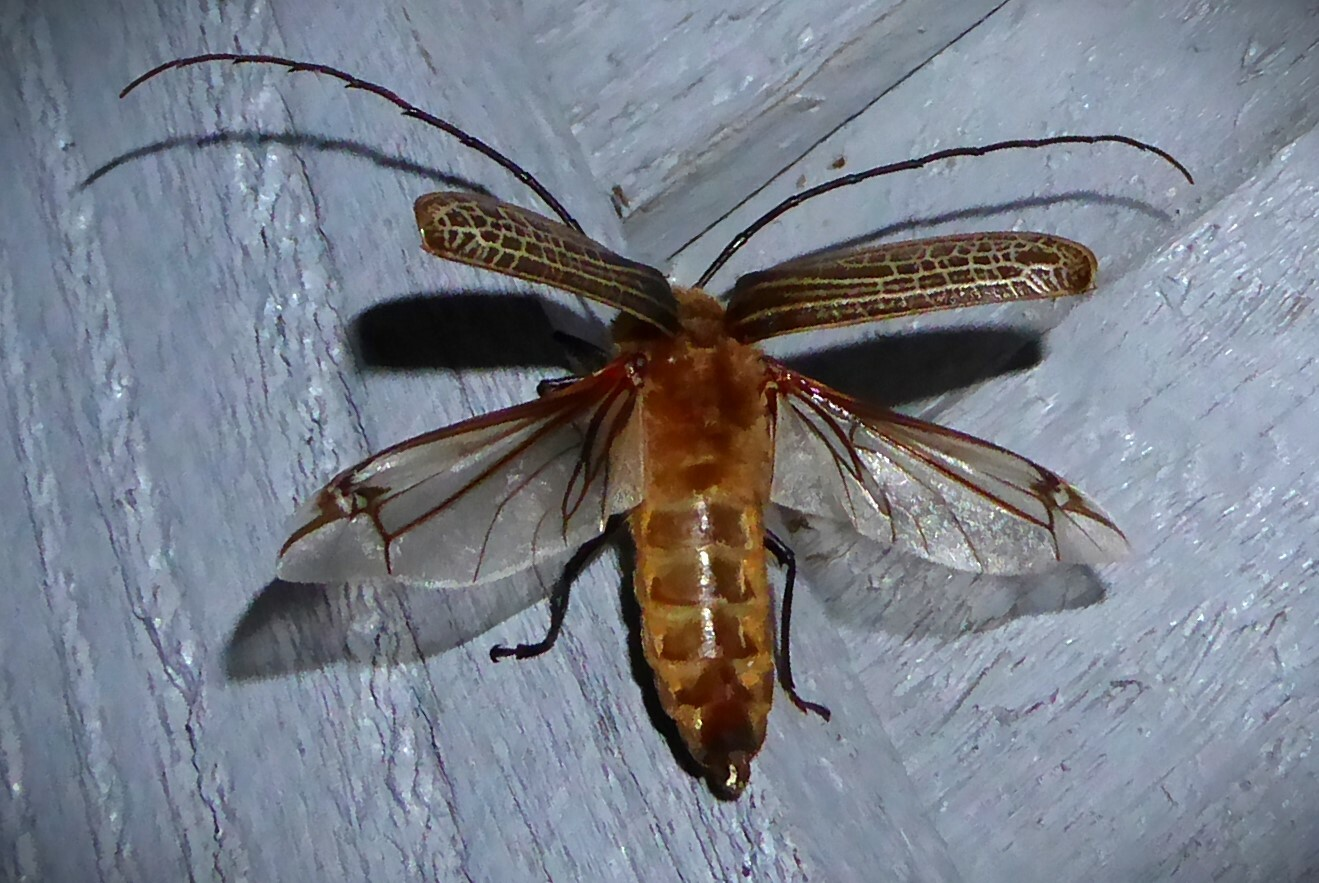
Huhu beetle with elytra and wings stretched out, about to take flight

The beetle is nocturnal and is strongly attracted to light, such as that from human dwellings. During daytime, the beetle hides in crevices or under debris, only becoming active after dusk. The female becomes active earlier than the male, but tends not to travel around as much. After coming out, the beetle will raise its elytra and begin wing movements to "warm up" its flight muscles before beginning to fly. One study recorded flight activity being abundant throughout the night until 2 am before ceasing between 4–5 am.

The adult female apparently produces an olfactory cue which attracts the male, with the male seemingly flying more frequently to detect the female. The adult of both sexes will exhibit a display behaviour if disturbed with the head jutting forward, mandibles opening to their full extent, antennae flailing and the head being raised and lowered. When anything touches the mandibles, it can deliver a bite and will latch onto the object. The beetles escalate conflicts with each other into combat by grappling with their forelegs, typically throwing one opponent onto its back. Any object coming into contact with the mandibles is seized frequently resulting in the loss of appendages. Usually, the male copulates with the female between 10 pm and 1 am. This begins when the male approaches the female from behind and mounts it while gripping its thorax with the middle and rear legs. If successful, both beetles become somewhat inactive, with both sexes' antennae twitching and with the male mandibles stimulating the female's upper surface, a process which may last up to fifteen minutes. The pair then begin to copulate, which may take up to twelve minutes.

== Gut microbiome ==
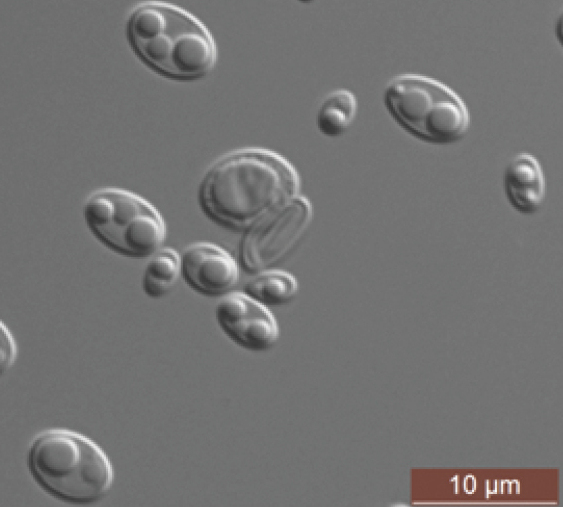
Scheffersomyces are found in the gut of huhu beetles.

In one study, the digestive tract of the huhu beetle was found to harbour a diverse range of microorganisms such as Acidobacteriaceae, Burkholderiaceae and Enterobacteriaceae. It was inferred that a large proportion of the microorganisms detected likely assists in the digestion process. The gut microbiome diversity is dependent on the food source the larva has access to. When fed on a diet of just cotton, a cellulose rich food source, the gut microbiome develops a high abundance of cellulose degraders. Conversely, when given a diet of pine wood, the gut microbiome had a high level of microorganisms such as Scheffersomyces, which are known to digest plant cell walls.

== As food ==
The huhu larva is eaten by humans, with a long history of consumption by Māori. Its flavour has been described as like peanut butter. The fully grown larva (called tātaka in Māori) is the most prized because they no longer contain undigested wood pulp. Huhu grubs may be consumed either raw or traditionally cooked in a hāngī. It has been proposed that huhu larva could potentially be farmed as a food source, but challenges such as maintaining genetic diversity and uncovering optimal growing conditions need to be investigated to see if this would be viable.

P. reticularis contains substantial amounts of nutrients. The larva and pupa are relatively high in fat (up to 45% and 58% dry weight in large larvae and pupae respectively). The fat in the larva is mostly oleic acid and palmitic acid. The second most abundant nutrient is protein, which is present at 30% dry weight in the large larvae, and close to 28% dry weight in the pupae. The ash content (representing minerals) is 1.8% dry weight in the large larva, and 2.2% in pupa. The minerals include manganese, magnesium, phosphorus, iron, copper, and zinc. One study found that the wild caught larva have very low levels of heavy metals and thus are safe for consumption.

== Predators ==
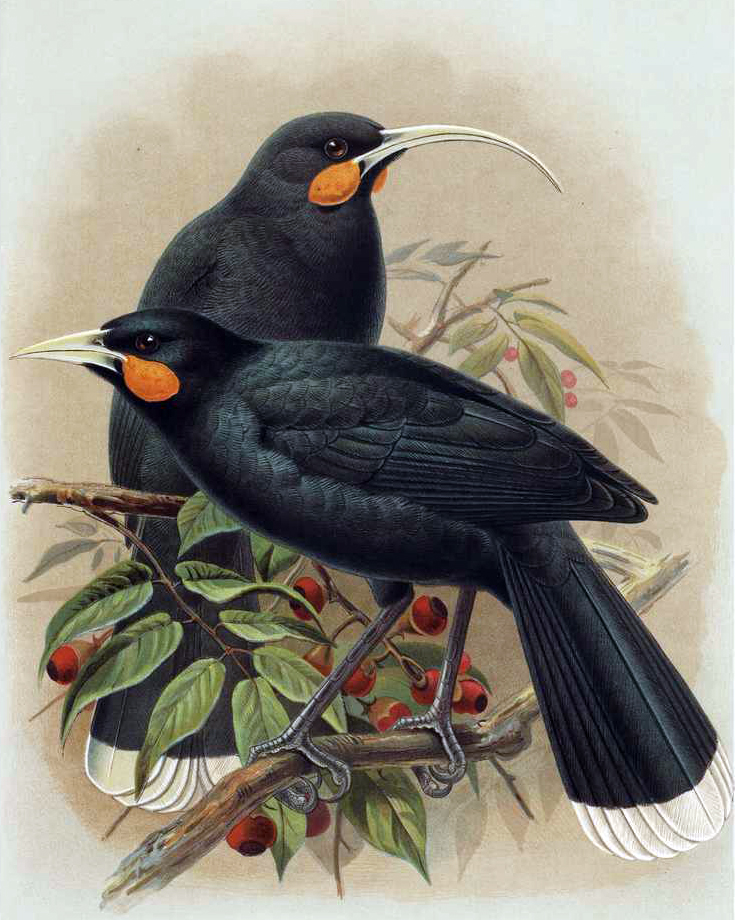
Huia, which preyed upon huhu beetles

The beetle is preyed upon by a wide range of predators. Some such predators are introduced to New Zealand, such as ship rats, little owl and magpie. Native predators include short-tailed bats, moreporks and saddlebacks. Before their extinction, huia were observed to utilise huhu beetle larvae as their principal food source. The larva is preyed upon by the larva of Thoramus wakefieldi, a species of click beetle, despite the relative small size of T. wakefieldi when compared to huhu larva. The larva is also preyed upon by Rhipistena cryptarthra, a species of wedge-shaped beetle.

=== Parasites ===
It is the only known host of Prionaphes depressus, a parasitoid species of fairy wasp that lays its offspring in the eggs of the huhu beetle. The beetle may also become infected with Beauveria, a parasitic fungus that infects insects. The infected beetle is generally killed by the fungus during the pre-pupal or pupal stage. The fungi generally infect 1 in 1,000 beetles, but this varies by location. The parasitic protozoan Gregarina has also been recorded infecting the larva.

== Forestry pest ==
Because the larva feeds on logs, it is considered a forestry pest. In New Zealand, logs that are to be exported overseas are legally mandated to first be treated with a fumigant, such as methyl bromide, or heated to prevent the beetles (among other insects) from accidentally being exported and introduced to other countries. This is done by third parties approved by the government. The huhu beetle has been identified as one of the five major quarantine risks posed to the United States by New Zealand wood. Treatments of huhu beetle infestations are further complicated due to the larva potentially burrowing up to two centimetres (0.8 in) in depth after five months and pupating at 7–10 cm (3–4 in) deep. Because of this, treatment methods must be able to penetrate deeper into the logs. Due to issues with methyl bromide eroding the ozone layer, alternative ways to treat infested wood have been proposed, such as using heat treatment or even gamma irradiation. As of 2023, methyl bromide is still used to treat logs, but cyanogen is now also used as an alternative fumigant. Heat treatment is also used.

== See also ==
- Māori cuisine
