= Kodamaea =

Scientific classification
- Kingdom: Fungi
- Division: Ascomycota
- Class: Saccharomycetes
- Order: Saccharomycetales
- Family: Debaryomycetaceae
- Genus: Kodamaea; Y. Yamada, Tom. Suzuki, M. Matsuda & Mikata

Type species
- Kodamaea ohmeri (Etchells & T.A. Bell) Y. Yamada, Tom. Suzuki, M. Matsuda & Mikata

Species
- K. anthophila K. kakaduensis K. laetipori K. nitidulidarum K. ohmeri

Genus of fungi

Kodamaea is a genus of fungi within the Saccharomycetales order. The relationship of this taxon to other taxa within the order is unknown (incertae sedis), and it has not yet been placed with certainty into any family.
