= Babjeviella =

Scientific classification
- Kingdom: Fungi
- Division: Ascomycota
- Class: Pichiomycetes
- Order: Serinales
- Family: Debaryomycetaceae
- Genus: Babjeviella; Kurtzman & M. Suzuki, 2010
- Species: B. inositovora

Binomial name
- Babjeviella inositovora (Golubev, Blagod., Suetin & R.S. Trots.) Kurtzman & M. Suzuki, 2010

Synonyms
- Yamadazyma inositovora (Golubev, Blagod., Suetin & R.S. Trots.) Billon-Grand 1989; Pichia inositovora Golubev, Blagod., Suetin & R.S. Trots. 1981

Monotypic genus of fungus

Babjeviella is a monotypic genus of fungus in the family Debaryomycetaceae. Its sole species is Babjeviella inositovora. It was first described as Pichia inositovora in 1981 by Golubev, Blagod., Suetin & RS Trots. It was revised as Babjeviella inositovora by Kurtzman & M. Suzuki in 2010.
