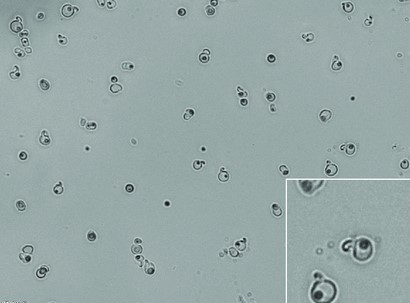
- Debaryomyces hansenii, zoomed part: cells with conjugation tubes,

Scientific classification
- Kingdom: Fungi
- Division: Ascomycota
- Class: Pichiomycetes
- Order: Serinales
- Family: Debaryomycetaceae
- Genus: Debaryomyces; Lodder & Kreger-van Rij (1984)

Type species
- Debaryomyces hansenii (Zopf) Lodder & Kreger-van Rij (1984)

Synonyms
- Isomyces Clem. (1931); Zonosporis Clem. (1931); Debaryolipomyces C.Ramírez (1957); Wingea Van der Walt (1971); Debaryozyma Van der Walt & Johannsen (1978)

= Debaryomyces =

Genus of fungi

Debaryomyces is a genus of yeasts in the family Debaryomycetaceae.

== Species ==
- D. artagaveytiae
- D. carsonii
- D. castellii
- D. coudertii
- D. etchellsii
- D. globularis
- D. hansenii
- D. kloeckeri
- D. kursanovii
- D. marama
- D. macquariensis
- D. melissophilus
- D. mrakii
- D. mycophilus
- D. nepalensis
- D. occidentalis
- D. oviformis
- D. polymorphus
- D. prosopidis
- D. pseudopolymorphus
- D. psychrosporus
- D. robertsiae
- D. singareniensis
- D. udenii
- D. vanrijiae
- D. vietnamensis
- D. vindobonensis
- D. yamadae
