= Arabitol =

Names
- IUPAC name D-Arabinitol
- Systematic IUPAC name (2R,4R)-Pentane-1,2,3,4,5-pentol
- Other names (2R,4R)-Pentane-1,2,3,4,5-pentaol (not recommended); Arabitol

Identifiers
CAS Number	7643-75-6
3D model (JSmol)	Interactive image
ChEBI	CHEBI:18333
ChemSpider	84971
ECHA InfoCard	100.006.988
PubChem CID	94154
UNII	45Z1K06N9V
CompTox Dashboard (EPA)	DTXSID4045979
- InChI: InChI=1S/C5H12O5/c6-1-3(8)5(10)4(9)2-7/h3-10H,1-2H2/t3-,4-/m1/s1 Key: HEBKCHPVOIAQTA-QWWZWVQMSA-N; InChI=1/C5H12O5/c6-1-3(8)5(10)4(9)2-7/h3-10H,1-2H2/t3-,4-/m1/s1 Key: HEBKCHPVOIAQTA-QWWZWVQMBW
- SMILES: OC[C@@H](O)C(O)[C@H](O)CO

Properties
Chemical formula	C_{5}H_{12}O_{5}
Molar mass	152.146 g·mol^{−1}
Appearance	Prismatic crystals
Melting point	103 °C (217 °F; 376 K)
Solubility in water	729 g/L

Hazards
NFPA 704 (fire diamond)	0 0 0
- Except where otherwise noted, data are given for materials in their standard state (at 25 °C [77 °F], 100 kPa). verify (what is ?) Infobox references

Arabitol, or arabinitol, is a sugar alcohol. It can be formed by the reduction of either arabinose. Some organic acid tests check for the presence of D-arabitol, which may indicate overgrowth of intestinal microbes such as Candida albicans or other yeast/fungus species.

Arabitol and lyxitol are diastereomeric pentitols, differing in the configuration of two stereocenters. Arabitol was initially produced, soon after its discovery, through the catalytic reduction of D-arabinose or D-lixose. It can be obtained in two spatial forms: L-arabitol and D-arabitol.

== Production ==
Industrial production of arabitol has traditionally relied on chemical reduction of oxidized arabinose derivatives, including lactones, arabinonic acid and lixonic acid. These processes require high temperatures (around 100 °C) and expensive catalysts, and generally involve extensive purification of the feedstock prior to catalytic reduction.

Biotechnological production routes have also been developed. L-Arabitol can be obtained by microbial fermentation using organisms capable of metabolizing L-arabinose, including Candida tropicalis, Pichia stipitis and Debaryomyces hansenii, as well as genetically engineered strains of Saccharomyces cerevisiae. Most reported studies have used batch cultivation with synthetic L-arabinose as substrate, although lignocellulosic hydrolysates such as sisal bagasse and soybean flour hydrolysates have also been evaluated.
