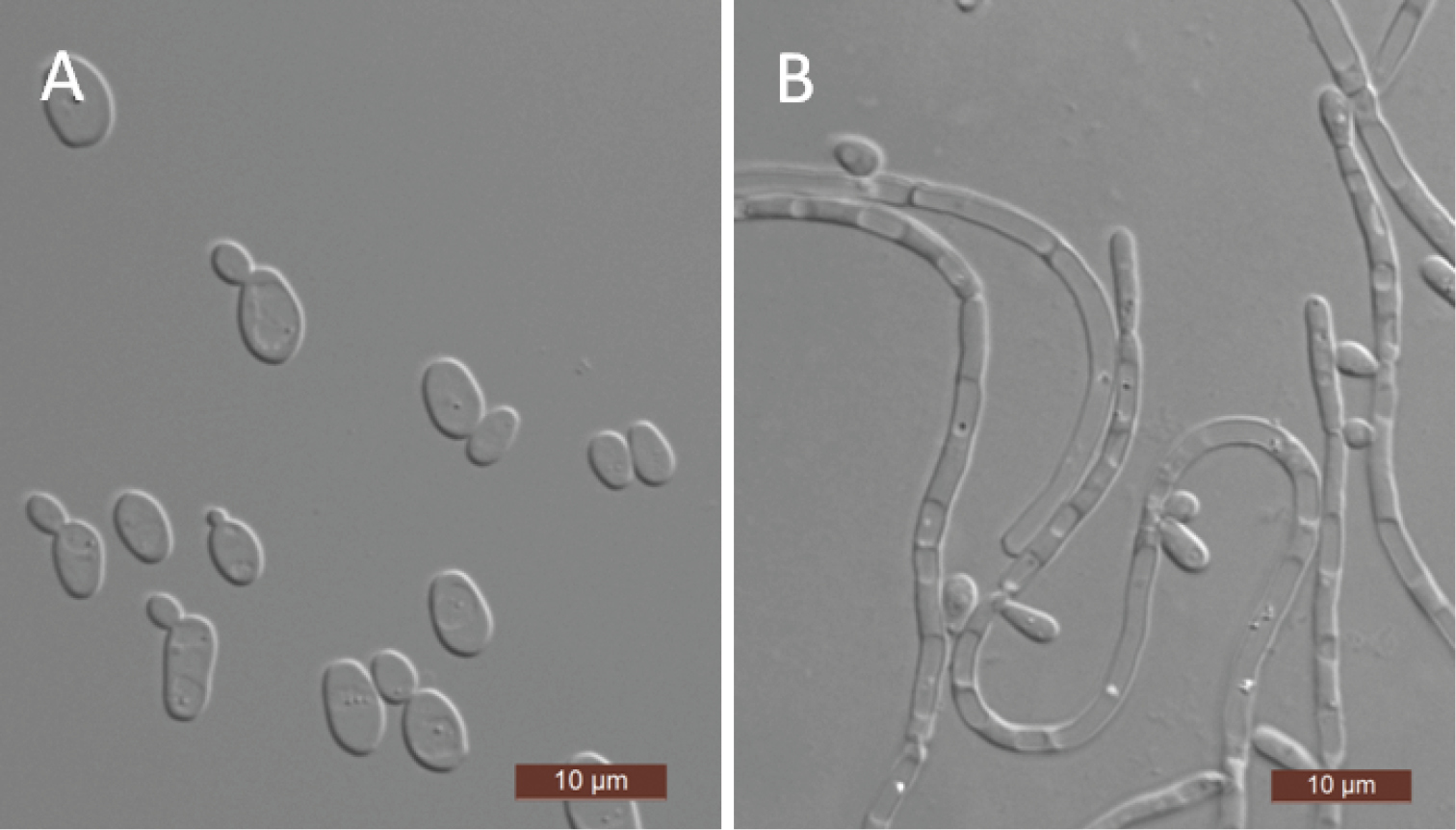
- Scheffersomyces jinghongensis budding cells and pseudohyphae

Scientific classification
- Kingdom: Fungi
- Division: Ascomycota
- Class: Saccharomycetes
- Order: Saccharomycetales
- Family: Debaryomycetaceae
- Genus: Scheffersomyces; Kurtzman & M. Suzuki, 2010

= Scheffersomyces =

Genus of fungi

Scheffersomyces is a genus of yeasts in the family Debaryomycetaceae, introduced by C. P. Kurtzman and M. Suzuki in 2010. One characteristic of these yeasts is that they form pseudohyphae.
