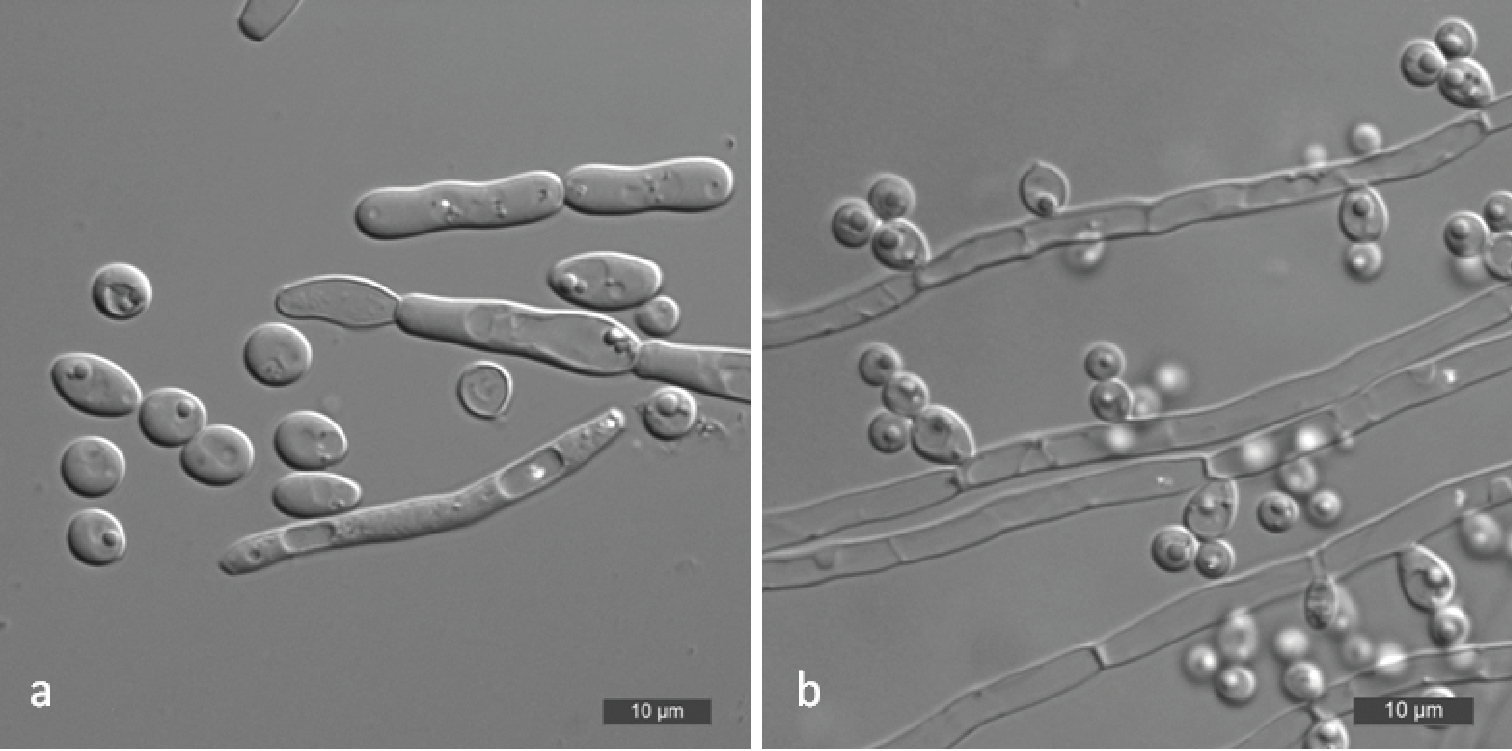
- Hemisphaericaspora rosae

Scientific classification
- Kingdom: Fungi
- Division: Ascomycota
- Subdivision: Saccharomycotina
- Class: Saccharomycetes
- Order: Saccharomycetales
- Family: Debaryomycetaceae; Kurtzman & M. Suzuki 2010

Genera
- See text

= Debaryomycetaceae =

Family of fungus

Debaryomycetaceae is a family of fungus in the order Saccharomycetales.

== Genera ==
The following genera are accepted within the family Debaryomycetaceae:

- Babjeviella
- Candida
- Hemisphaericaspora
- Meyerozyma
- Millerozyma
- Nematodospora
- Priceomyces
- Scheffersomyces
- Suhomyces
- Yamadazyma

The MycoBank online database additionally recognizes Debaryomyces and Schwanniomyces within Debaryomycetaceae, but Catalogue of Life places both within the family Saccharomycetaceae. (The COL approach is not self-consistent because the type genus of this family is Debaryomyces.)

2023 phylogenomic classification gives:

- Aciculoconidium
- Candida
- Danielozyma
- Debaryomyces
- Diutina
- Hemisphericaspora
- Hyphopichia
- Kodamaea
- Kurtzmaniella
- Limtongozyma
- Lodderomyces
- Metahyphopichia
- Meyerozyma
- Millerozyma
- Nematodospora
- Priceomyces
- Scheffersomyces
- Spathaspora
- Suhomyces
- Schwanniomyces
- Teunomyces
- Wickerhamia
- Yamadazyma
