= Alkylidene ketene =

Alkylidene ketenes are a class of organic compounds that are of the form R_{2}C=C=C=O. They are a member of the family of heterocumulenes (R_{2}C=(C)_{n}=O), and are often considered an unsaturated homolog of ketenes (R_{2}C=C=O). Sometimes referred to as methyleneketenes, these compounds are highly reactive and much more difficult to access than ketenes.

Because of their instability, alkylidene ketenes are often observed as reaction intermediates. While the parent alkylidene ketene propadienone only exists on the order of seconds in vacuum at room temperature, other more highly substituted species are stable at room temperature. A notable alkylidene ketene is carbon suboxide, of the structure O=C=C=C=O.

== Properties ==
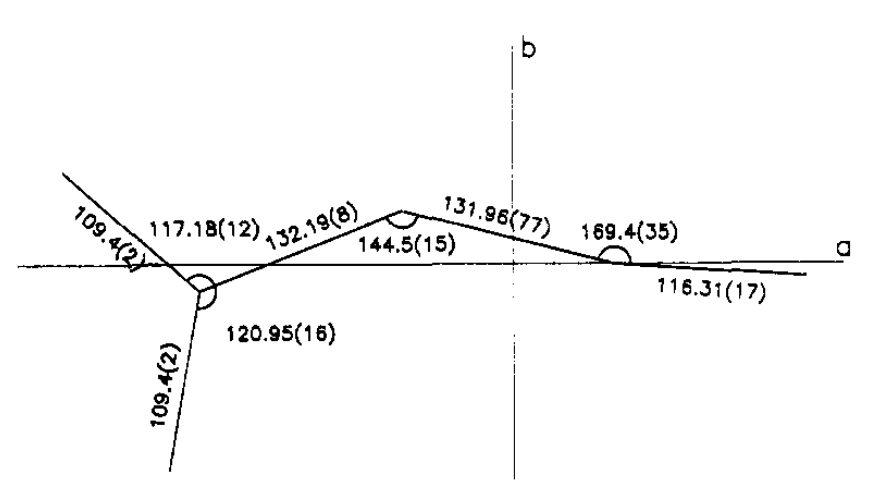
Propadienone structure (with distances in pm) as reported by Brown et al.

Despite the nature of the multiple double bonds between heavy atoms in alkylidene ketenes, they have been shown to adopt a slightly bent geometry that is not truly fully linear. Brown et al. found via the microwave spectra of ^{13}C-labelled propadienone the structural parameters for this species, along with observed intersystem transitions that show that it converts between equivalent bent conformations, resulting in a molecular nonrigidity. More recent studies of 1,2,3-triazole and imidazole-based alkylidene ketenes have confirmed similar bent structures via X-ray crystallography.

IR and NMR analysis of the room-temperature stable 1,2,3-triazole stabilized alkylidene ketene suggests three major resonance structures as shown below.

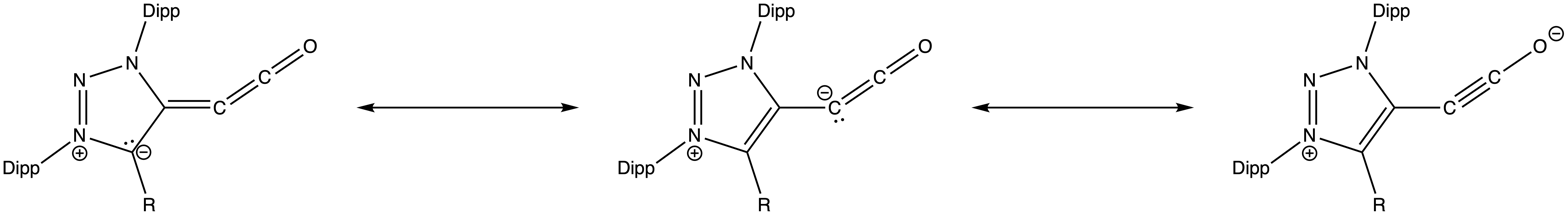
Resonance structures for 1,2,3-triazole-stabilized alkylidene ketenes

The alkylidene ketene group gives strong IR peaks around 2100 and 2085 cm^{−1}, similar to previously studied trapped methyleneketenes, and indicating π-backbonding character into CO. ^{13}C-NMR indicates a negative charge on the α-carbon, supporting the zwitterionic resonance structure (pictured center above).

== Synthesis ==
The most common synthesis for substituted alkylidene ketenes is via the thermolysis of an alkylidene derivative of Meldrum's acid. Some other common synthetic routes are summarized below. Notably, in 2021, Severin and Hansmann both reported novel synthetic methods for room-temperature stable alkylidene ketenes via N_{2}/CO exchange from diazoalkenes stabilized by N-heterocyclic carbenes.

=== Thermolysis of carboxylic acids and Meldrum's acid species ===
These reactions are typically done in the gas phase. Elimination of an α,β-unsaturated carboxylic acid is difficult since it requires breaking the C-H bond of an sp^{2} hybridized carbon. Presently, using a Meldrum's acid derivative as a starting material is the most common synthetic route for synthesizing alkylidene ketenes.

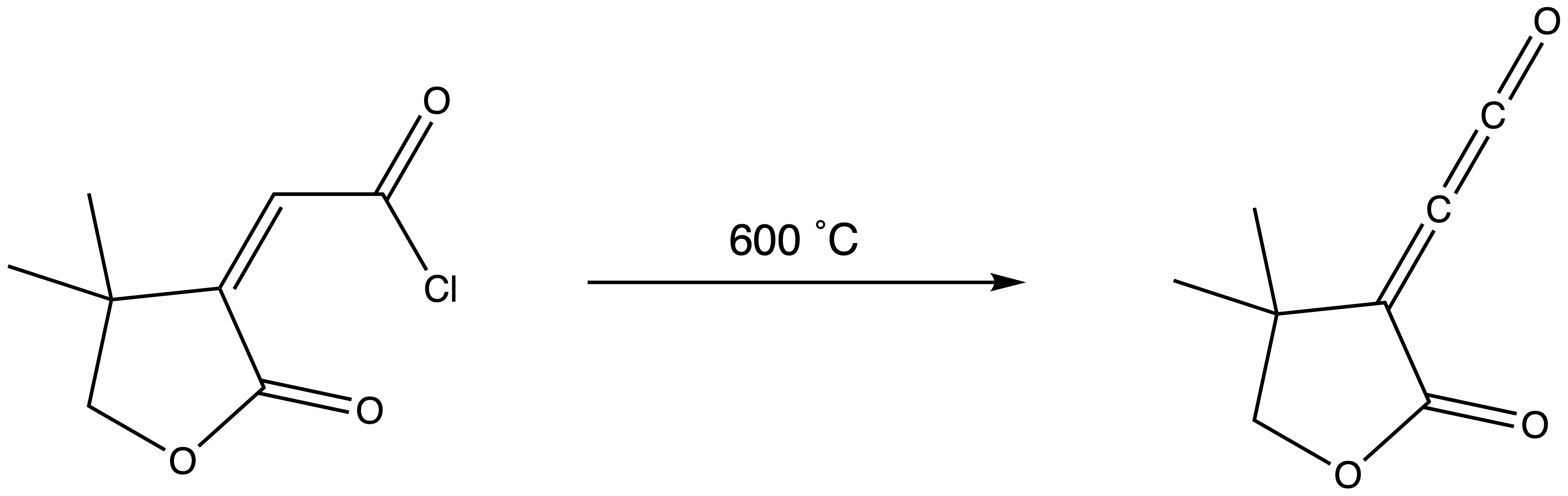
Thermolysis of acyl chloride to form alkylidene ketene

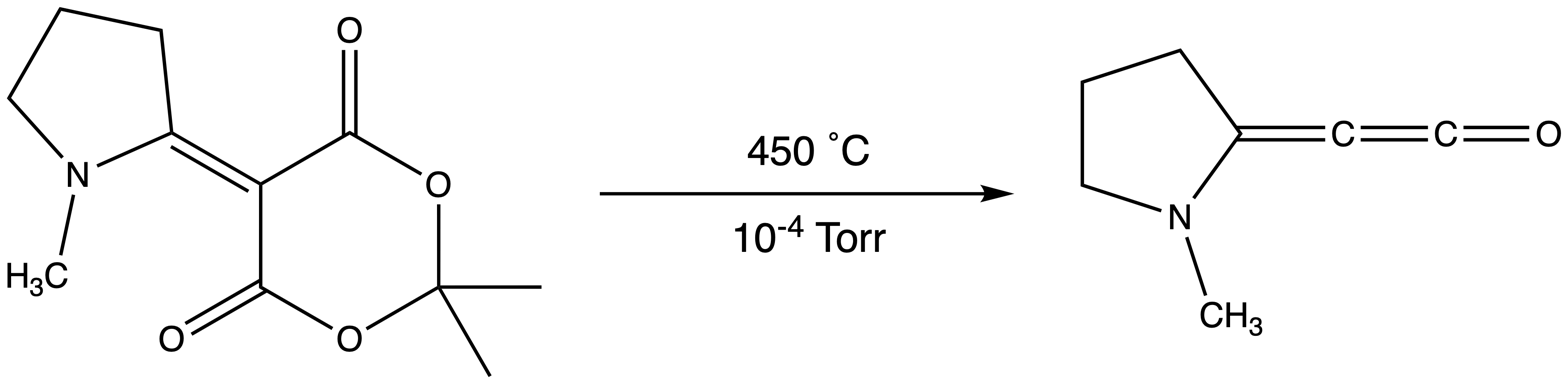
Via thermolysis of alkylidene Meldrum's acid derivative

=== Photochemical cleavage ===
Alkylidene ketenes can be generated by cleaving an α,β-unsaturated carbonyl or cyclic ketene with a combination of heat and irradiation. While this transformation can occur through thermolysis, this process proceeds much more easily via photoirradiation.

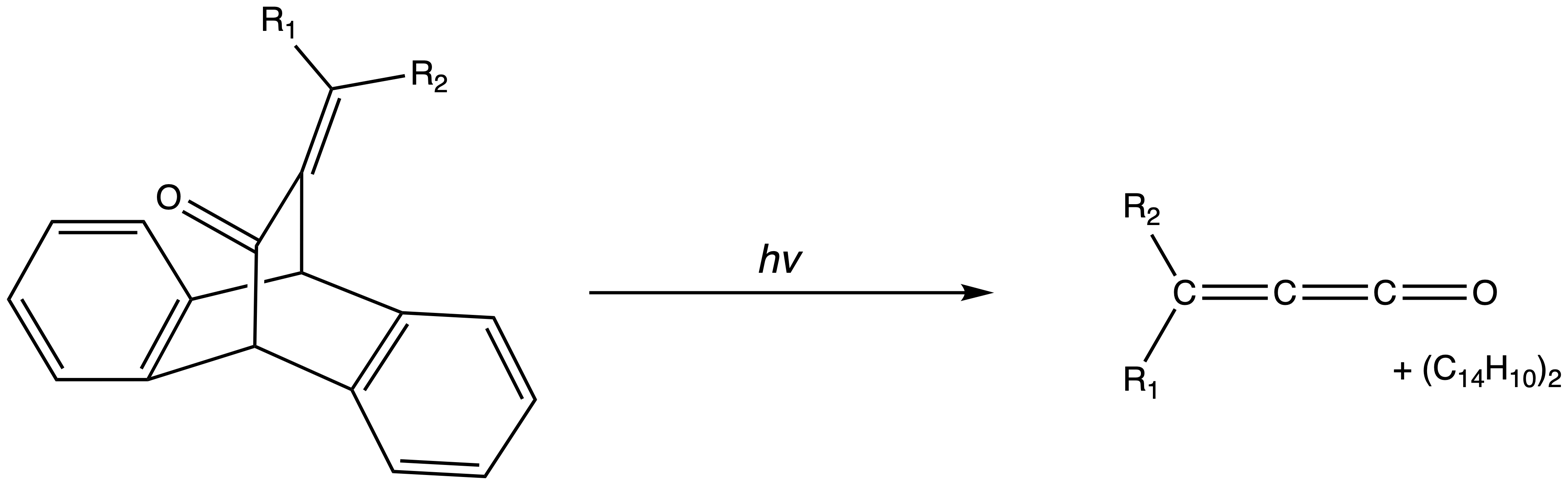
Photochemical cleavage of alpha-methylene ketone to form methylene ketene

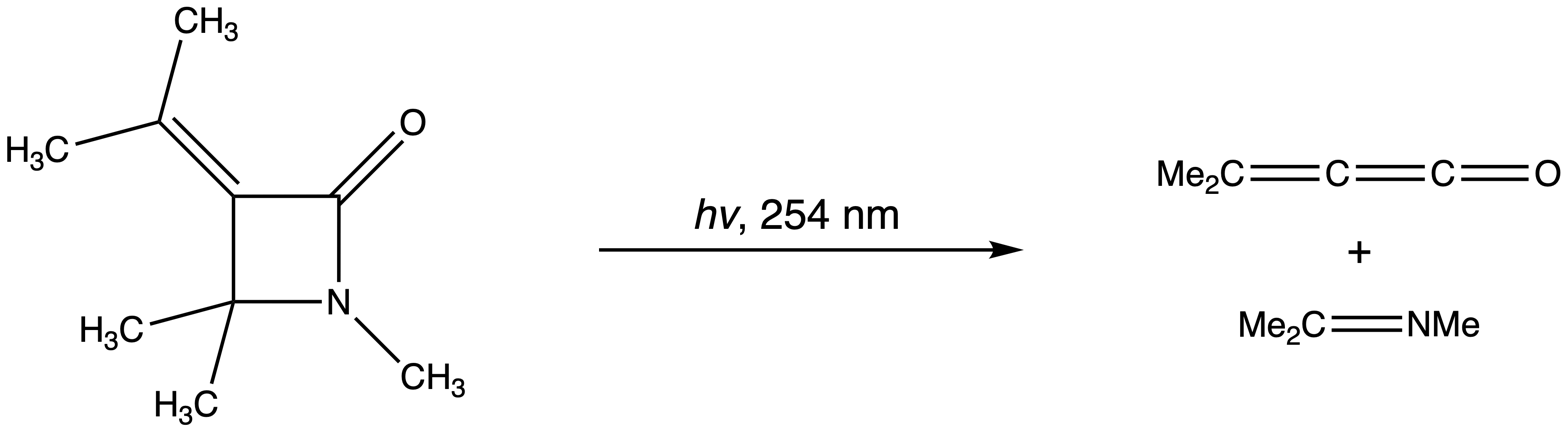
Ring opening of azetidinone to form methylene ketene

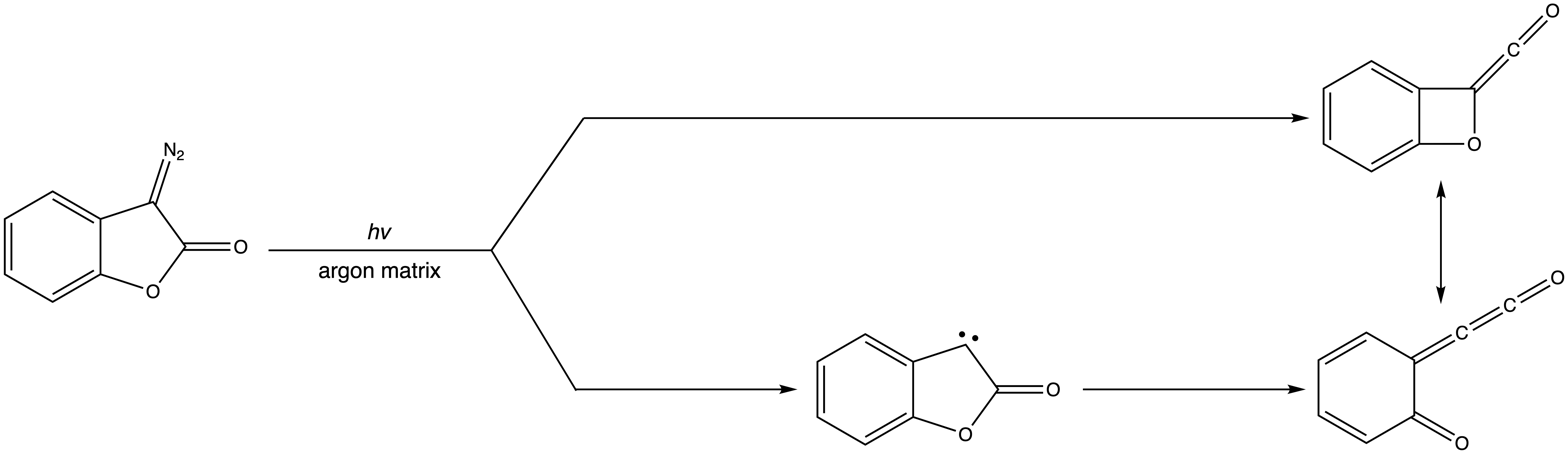
Photolysis of 3-diazobenzofuranone to make ketene and o-quinoid methyleneketene

=== Via acid anhydride pyrolysis ===
Pyrolysis of anhydrides and propiolic acid esters can also make alkylidene ketenes via intramolecular hydrogen transfer in a retro-ene reaction.

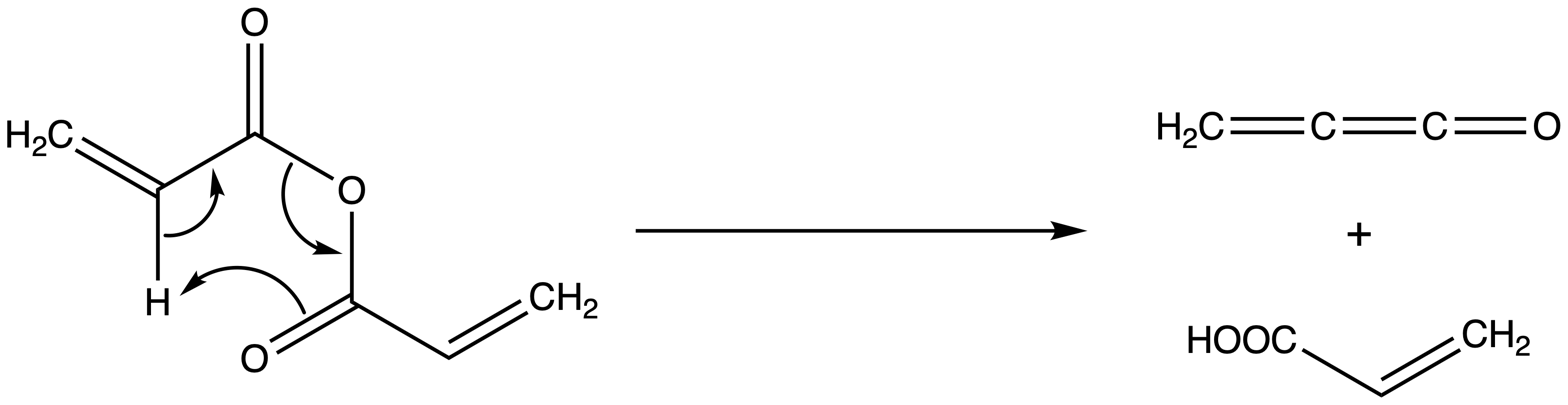
Methylene ketene from flash vacuum pyrolysis of acrylic anhydride

=== Via N_{2}/CO exchange ===
Reacting N-heterocyclic olefins with N_{2}O to afford various diazoolefin species, Severin and Hansmann reported a method for generating highly thermally stable alkylidene ketenes via N_{2}/CO exchange at atmospheric pressure.

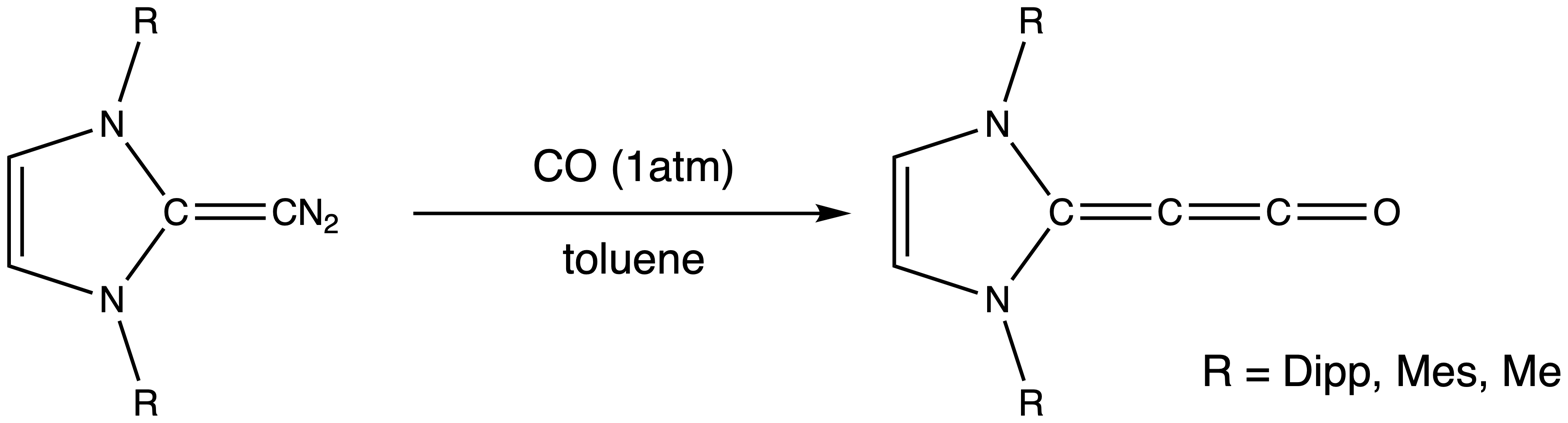
Severin's synthesis of an alkylidene ketene via N_{2}/CO exchange of an imidazole

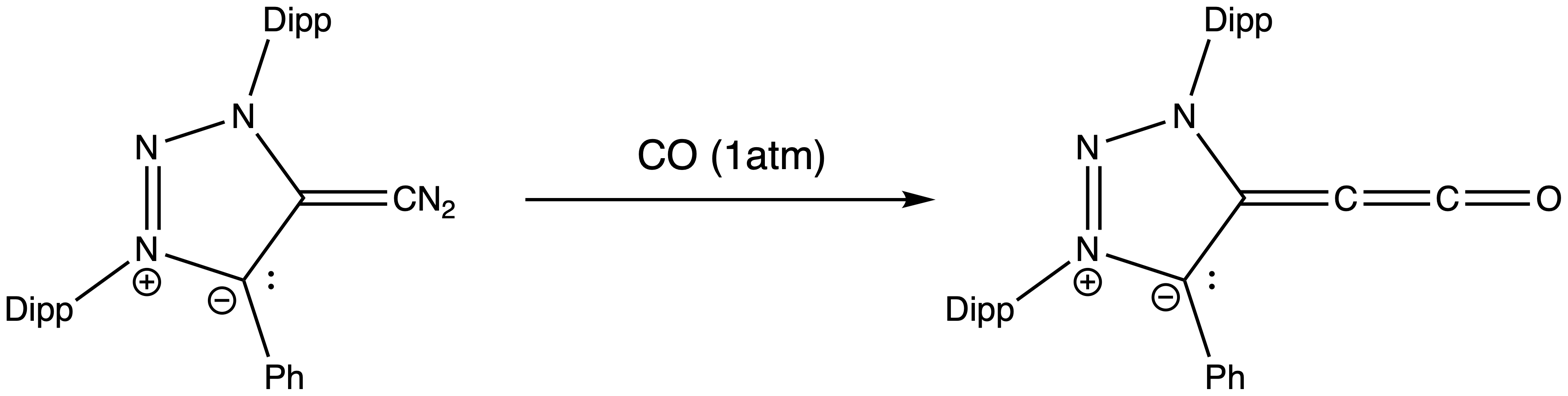
Hansmann's synthesis of an alkylidene ketene via N_{2}/CO exchange of a 1,2,3-triazole

== Reactions ==
=== Dimerization ===
Alkylidene ketenes can readily dimerize and participate in cycloaddition reactions. Often orange or red in color, these dimers can be generated both in solution and via pyrolysis. Dimer formation is typically inhibited at the low temperatures used to analyze monomer species (especially methylene ketene monomers), but once the dimers are formed, it is often impossible to convert back to its substituent monomers even via thermolysis at high temperatures.

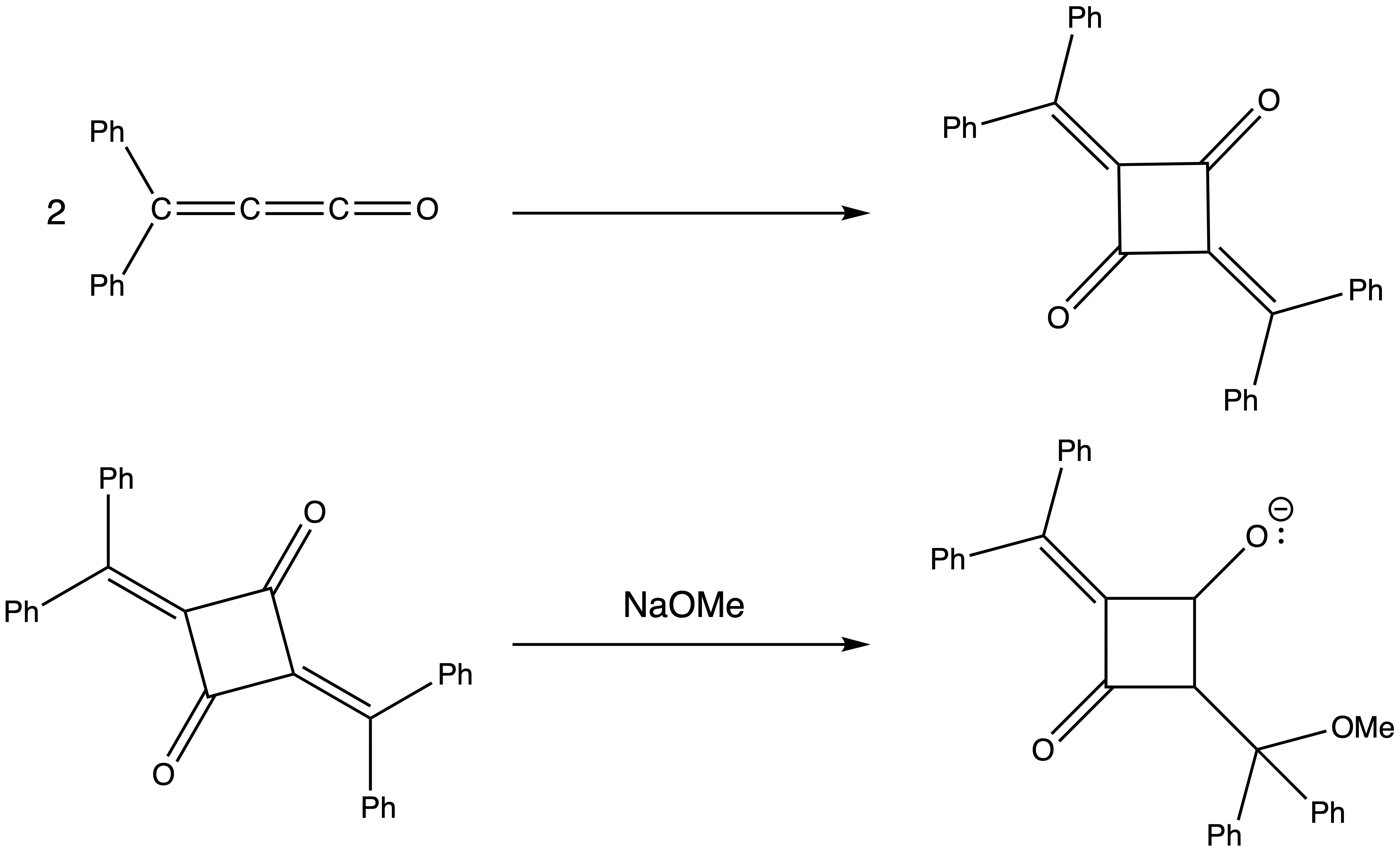
Dimerization of phenyl-substituted alkylidene ketene and subsequent reaction in sodium methoxide

=== Cycloaddition ===
Various cycloadducts of alkylidene ketenes can be made, including the addition of an alkylidene ketene and ketene depicted below. When reacting with either ketene or dimethylketene, the formation of the β-lactone product was favored, as this cyclization occurs via an attack on the terminal ketene carbonyl.

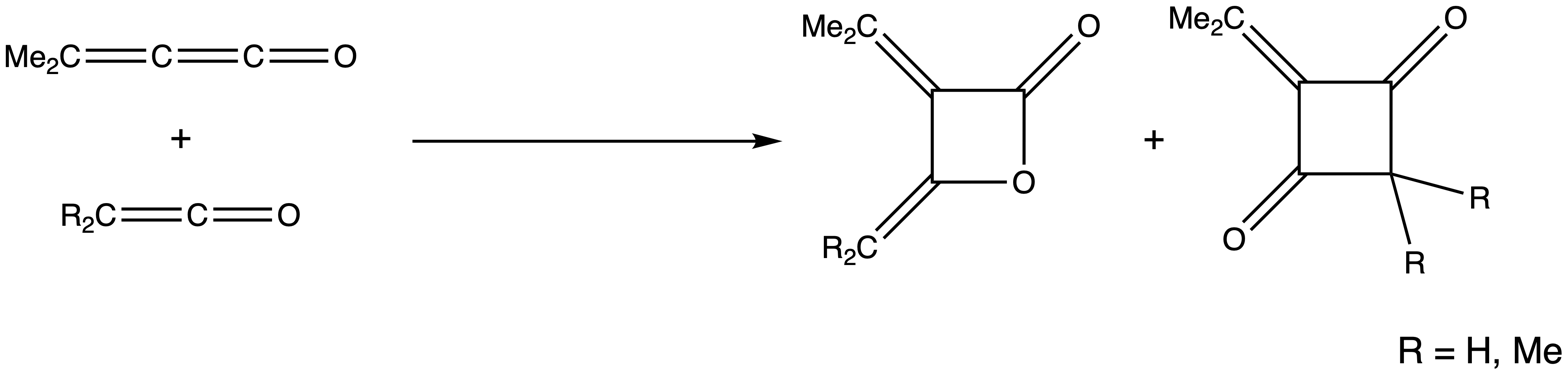
Cycloaddition of dimethylmethyleneketene and ketene to form a β-lactone and a cyclic 1,3-diketone

=== Reactions with nucleophiles ===
Alkylidene ketenes react similarly to ketenes in the presence of nucleophiles, often generating equal amounts of E and Z isomers in α,β-unsaturated esters. Secondary isomerism in pyrolytic systems can, however, result in the isolation of a thermodynamic product, as is the case with the generation of phenyl-substituted methylene ketene from a Meldrum's acid derivative and hot methanol vapor. Other alkyl substitutions can also lead to β,γ-unsaturated products. This migration of the double bond can occur via secondary photoenolization, deconjugation of unsaturated products, or isomerization to a vinylidene ketene.

=== Decarbonylation ===
Decarbonylation has been observed but is thermodynamically difficult to achieve with an activation energy of over 40 kcal mol^{−1}. However, the overall decarbonylation of propadienone to ethyne and carbon monoxide is exothermic by 2 - 5 kcal mol^{−1}.

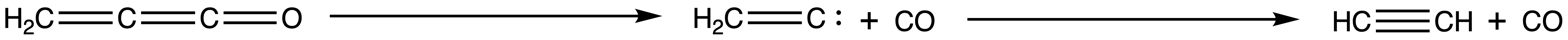
Decarbonylation scheme for propadinone to ethyne and carbon monoxide

=== As C-donor ligand for transition and main group metals ===
Severin reported coordination chemistry using an imidazole-stabilized alkylidene ketene. Coordination increased the C-C-CO bond angle and bond lengths, indicating increased ylidic character. Using the average CO stretching frequency as a measure of donor strength, the alkylidene ketene is weaker than its diazoolefin starting material, but stronger than N-heterocyclic carbenes.

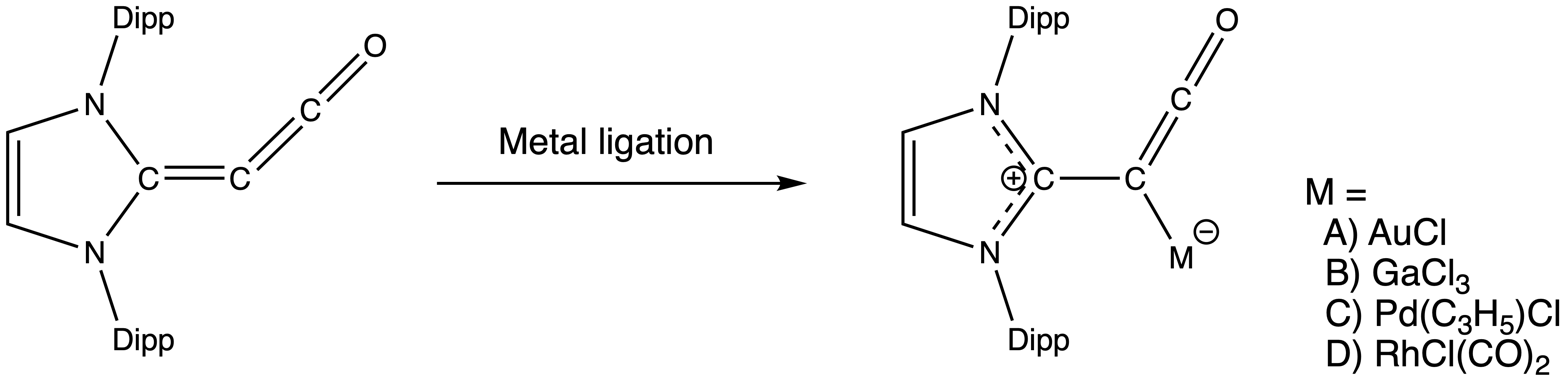
Representative metal complexes with alkylidene ketene as a C-donor ligand

== See also ==
- Ketene
- Ketenyl anion
- Propadienone
- Carbon suboxide
- Flash vacuum pyrolysis
