= C3H2O =

Chemical compounds with the molecular formula C3H2O

The molecular formula C_{3}H_{2}O (molar mass: 54.05 g/mol, exact mass: 54.0106 u) may refer to:

- Cyclopropenone
- Propadienone
- Propiolaldehyde, or propynal
