= N-Heterocyclic olefins =

Neutral heterocyclic compound

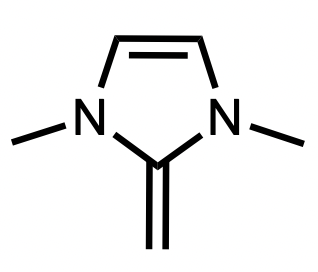
Unsaturated NHO

An N-heterocyclic olefin (NHO) is a neutral heterocyclic compound with a highly polarized, electron-rich C=C olefin attached to a heterocycle made up of two nitrogen atoms. A derivative of N-heterocyclic carbenes (NHCs), NHO was first synthesized in 1961 by Horst Böhme and Fritz Soldan, but the term NHO was not used until 2011 by Eric Rivard and coworkers. Since its discovery, NHOs have been applied in organocatalysis, metal ligation, and polymerization.

== Structure and properties ==
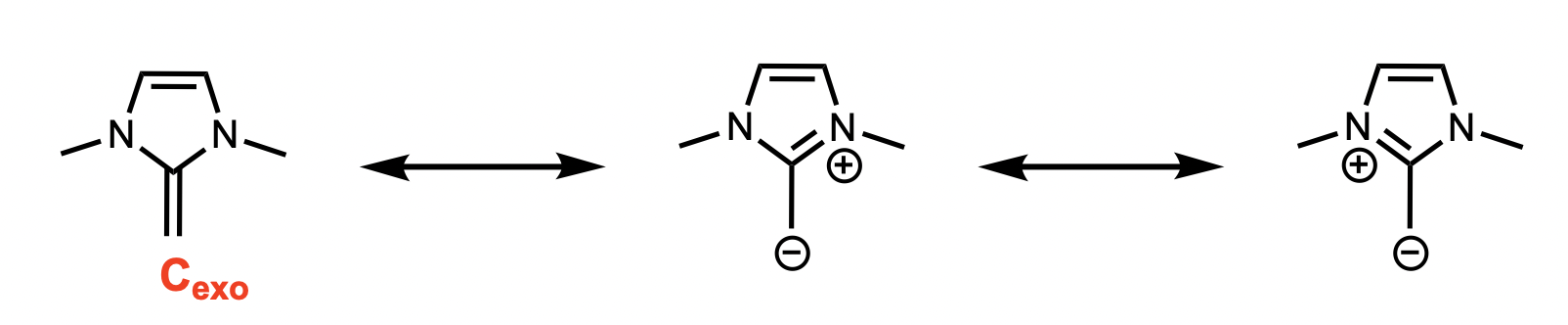
NHOs have resonance structures that place a negative charge on the exocyclic carbon and a positive charge delocalized in the heterocycle. This stabilizes the olefin and explains its basicity.

NHOs have a ylide resonance structure that places a positive charge on the heterocycle and a negative charge on the exocyclic carbon of the olefin, called C_{exo.} This creates a highly polarized C=C bond that is resonance stabilized, and an especially nucleophilic C_{exo}. NHOs are strong nucleophiles and Lewis bases, and can exist with saturated or unsaturated heterocycles. Pengju Ji, Jin-Pei Cheng and coworkers found that the pK_{a}s of some NHOs' conjugate acids were around 14 to 25 in DMSO. Surprisingly, unsaturated NHOs – which contain double bonds within the heterocycle – were more nucleophilic than their NHC counterparts due to their aromatization, but saturated NHOs were less nucleophilic than their NHC counterparts. NHOs are also considered deoxy Breslow intermediates, which are often used in carbene catalysis.

Due to the reactivity of the C_{exo}, NHOs are kept under inert atmospheres. Adding an electron withdrawing group at C_{exo} can stabilize the compound under non-inert atmospheres, but this costs its reactivity and thereby its usage in catalysis. They are also prone to protonation when exposed to water.

== Synthesis ==
The first synthesis of an NHO was reported by Horst Böhme and Fritz Soldan in 1961, where they synthesized its precursor salt, and reacted that with elemental sodium.

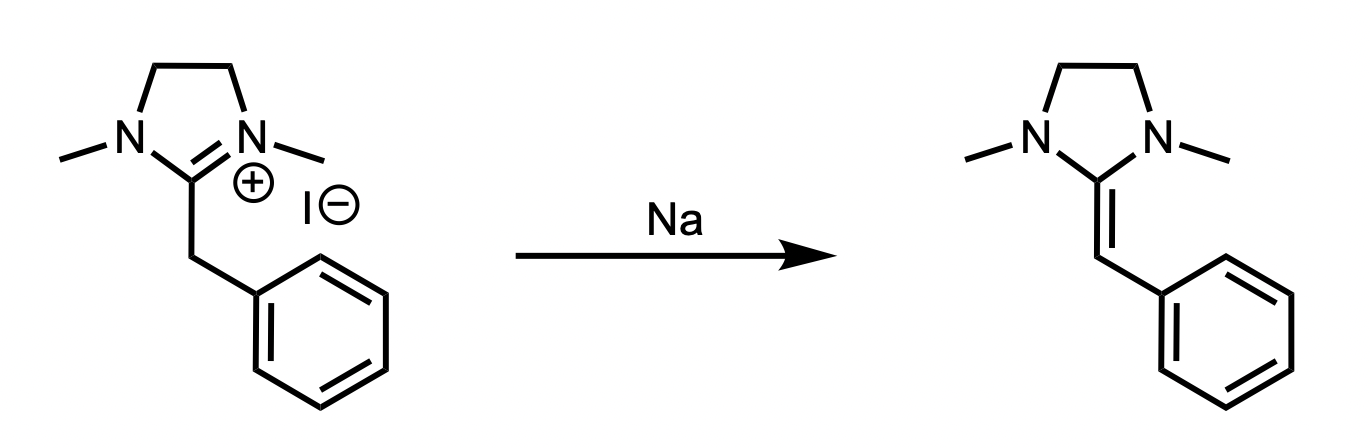
Horst Böhme and Fritz Soldan synthesized the first NHO in 1961 using the precursor salt and elemental sodium.

Based on this, the most common synthetic route now is a deprotonation of the corresponding precursor salts with a strong base, such as potassium hydride.

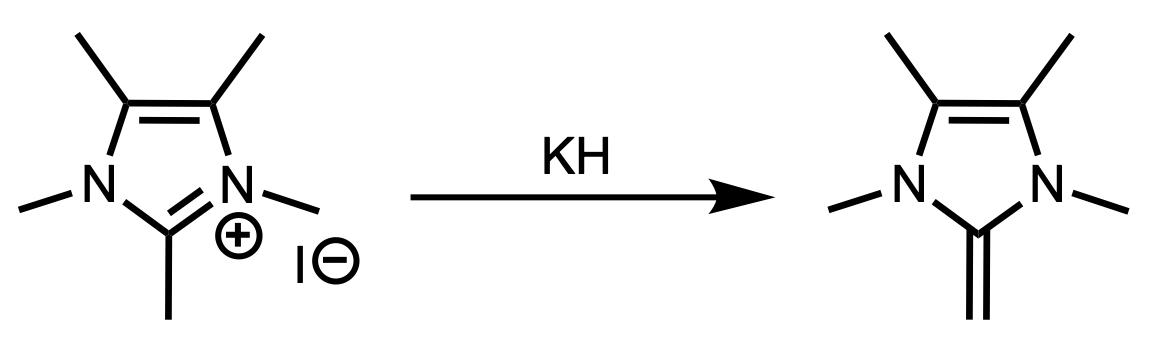
NHOs are now commonly synthesized by reacting the NHC precursor salts with a strong base, like potassium hydride.

A common method to generate saturated precursor salts is to use diamine and orthoester starting materials with ammonium tetrafluoroborate.

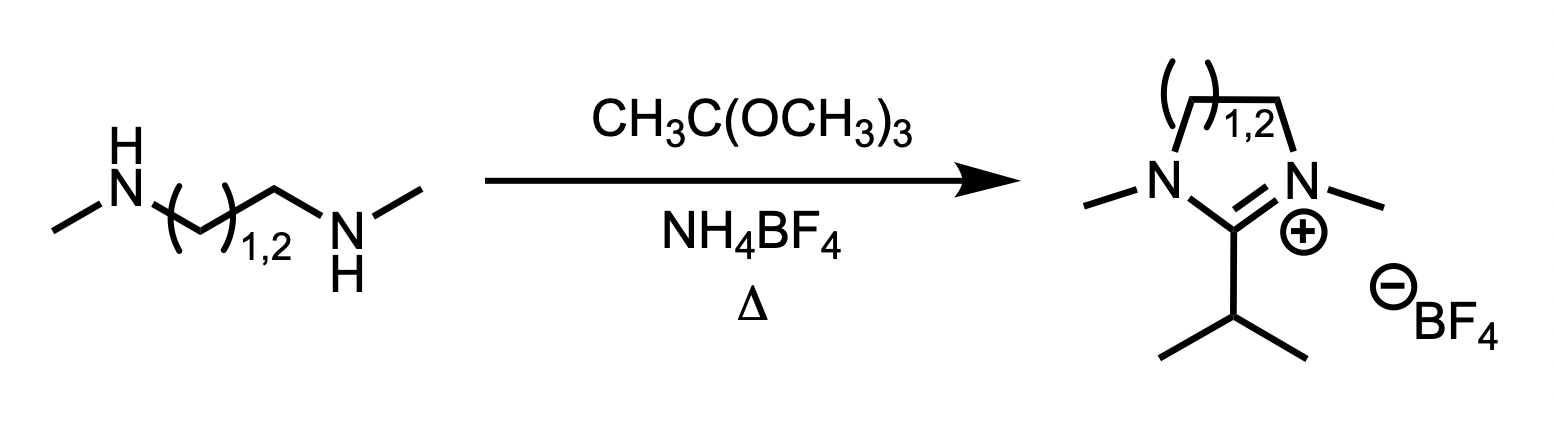
Diamines and orthoesters react in the presence of ammonium tetrafluoroborate to yield saturated NHC precursor salts.

Unsaturated precursor salts can be synthesized by converting commercially available imidazoles into salts or running the Radziszewski reaction.

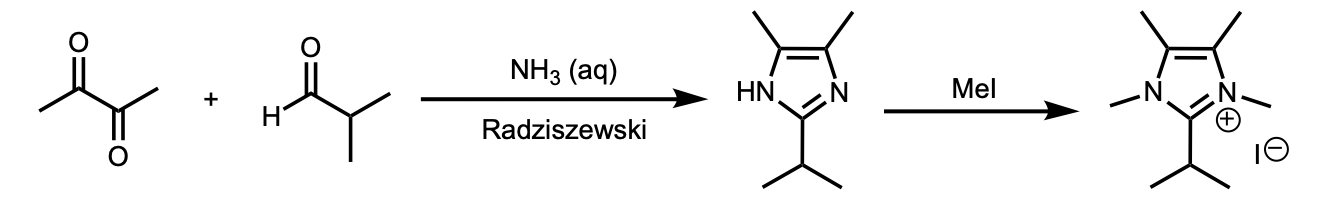
Unsaturated NHC precursor salts are synthesized through the Radziszewski reaction.

For sterically bulky NHOs, it is also possible to generate them by using the free NHC analogues.

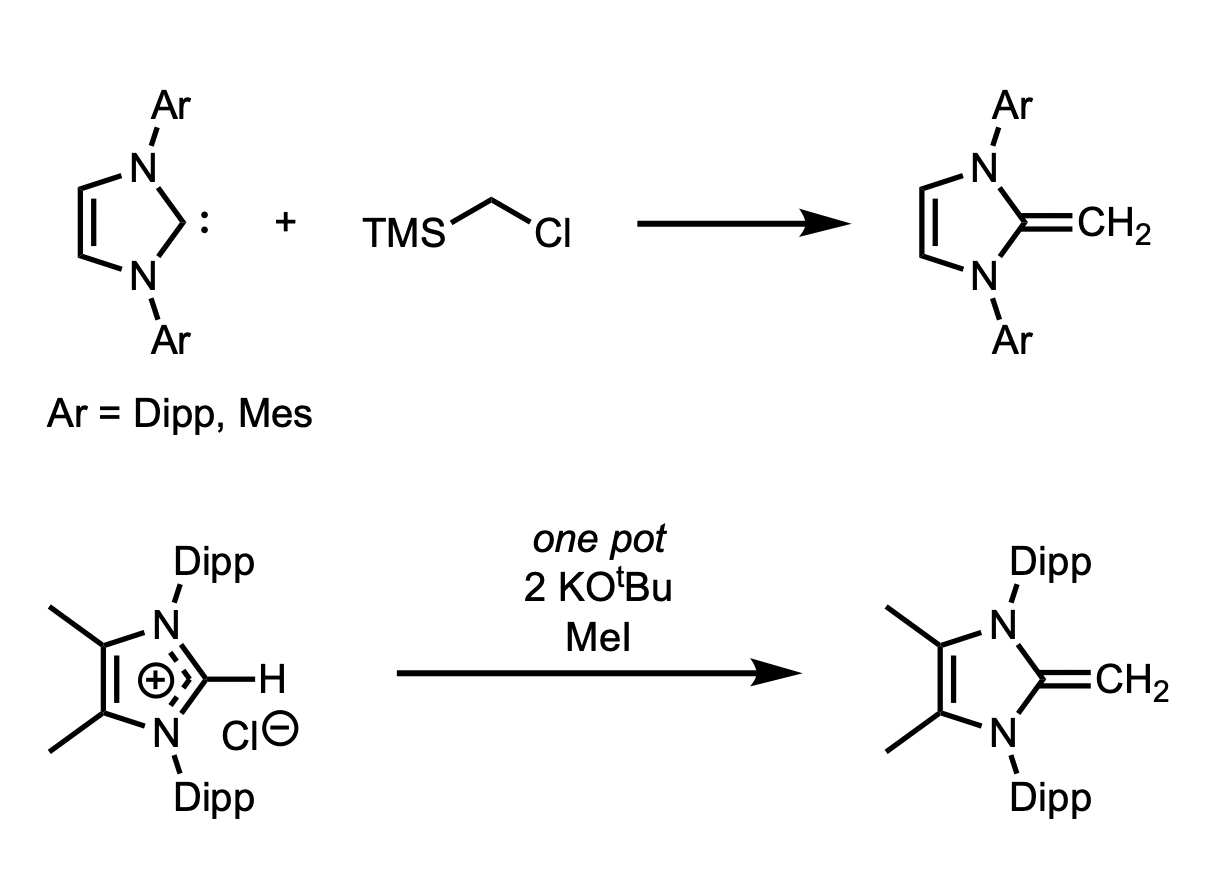
Powers et al. were able to synthesize NHOs with bulky substituents using the free NHC analogues.

== Reactivity ==
=== Organocatalysis ===
The reactivity of NHOs make them promising tools for organocatalysis. They are able to catalyze small molecule activation and several organocatalytic reactions.

==== CO_{2} sequestration ====
NHOs are able to activate small molecules, such as CO_{2}, CS_{2}, SO_{2}, and COS, by forming adducts with them.

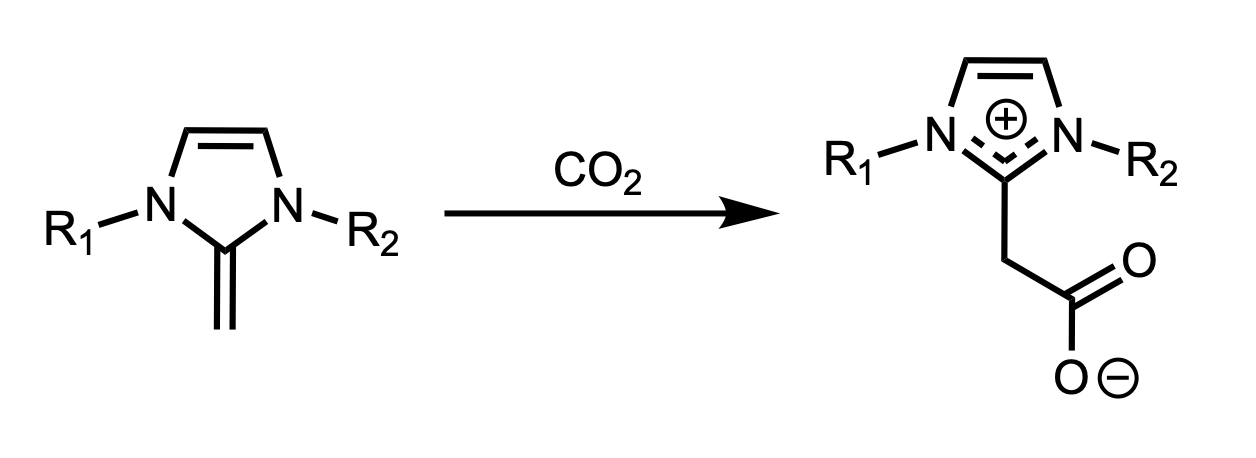

NHO-CO_{2} adducts are of particular interest due to their reactivity; NHOs are able to form zwitterionic NHO-CO_{2} adducts that are 10-200 times more reactive than NHC-CO_{2} adducts. These adducts are then able to do many reactions, such as carboxylative cyclizations of propargyl alcohols and cycloadditions with aziridines to yield oxazolidinones. NHO-CO_{2}s' reactivity and usage make them a more powerful organocatalyst and CO_{2} capturer than their NHC counterparts.

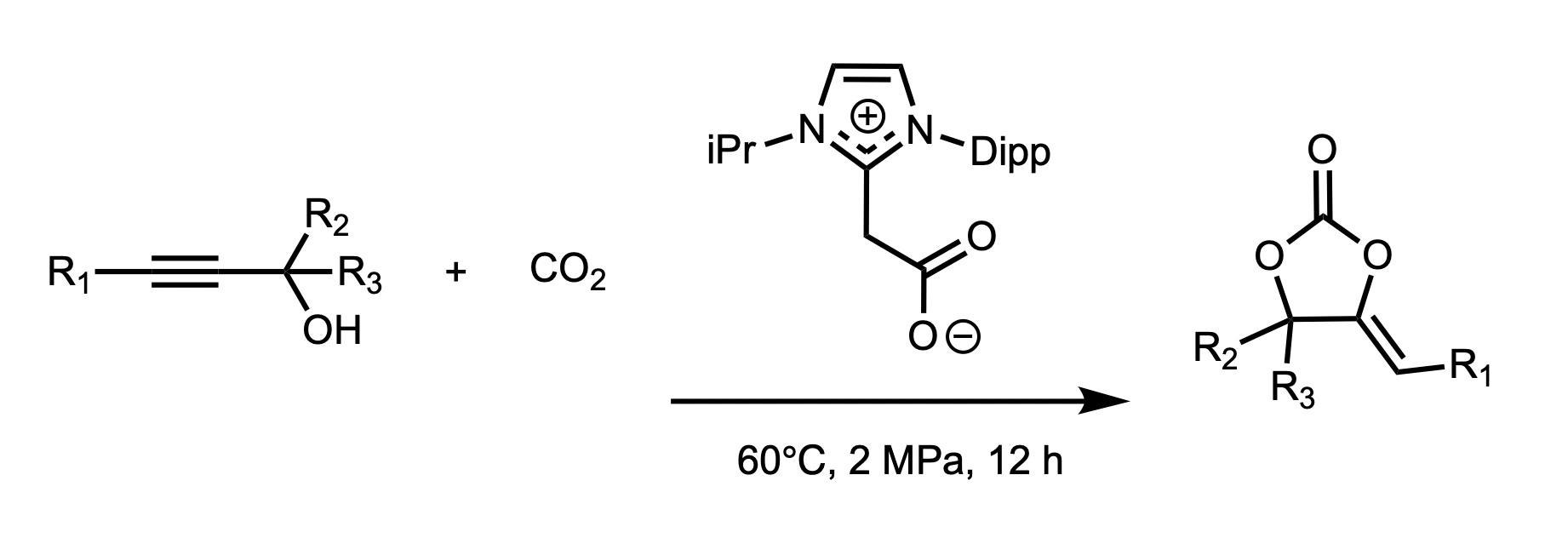
Lu and co-workers found that the NHO-CO_{2} adduct catalyzes carboxylative cyclization of propargylic alcohols in high yield under mild conditions.

==== Organocatalytic reactions ====
NHOs and their precursor salts and their precursor salts are able to engage in various organocatalytic reactions. The precursor salts are able to catalyze reactions like hydrosilylations and tranesterifications.

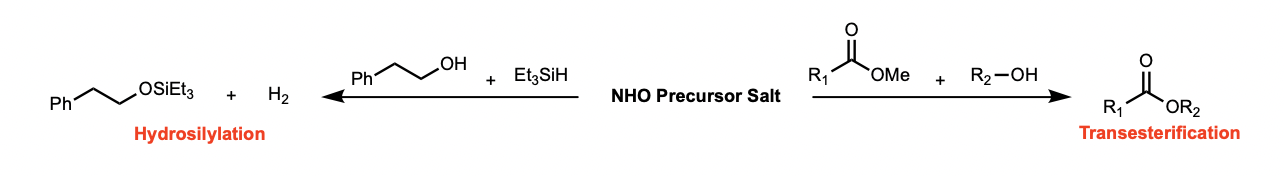
Some organocatalytic reactions, such as hydrosilylation and transesterification, use the NHO precursor salt as the catalyst.

NHOs themselves can also catalyze organic reactions such as hydroborylations, participate in asymmetric catalysis like an enantioselective amination, and activate bonds including aromatic C-F bonds.

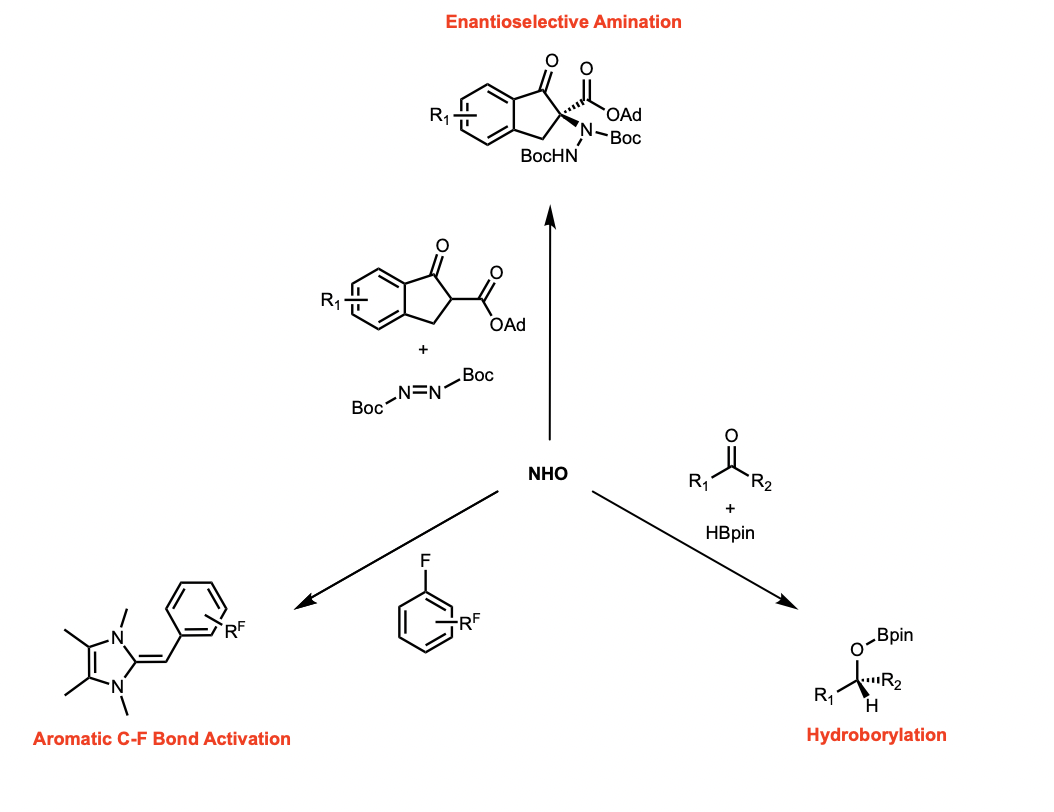
NHOs can catalyze certain reactions, such as hydroborylation, aromatic C-F bond activation, and enantioselective amination.

=== Metal ligation ===
==== Main group metals ====
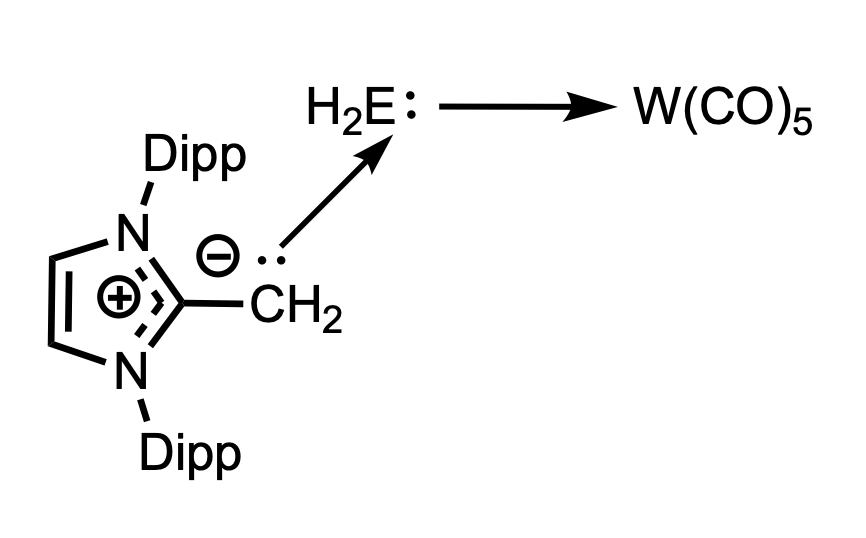
When deprotonated, NHOs can be ligands for main group hydrides. E = Ge, Sn.

NHOs can stabilize low oxidation state main group hydrides, like GeH_{2} and SnH_{2} that are coordinated to W(CO)_{5}. When deprotonated, these NHOs become anionic, four-electron bridging ligands that can bind to two Ge centers, hence displaying carbanion-like behavior.

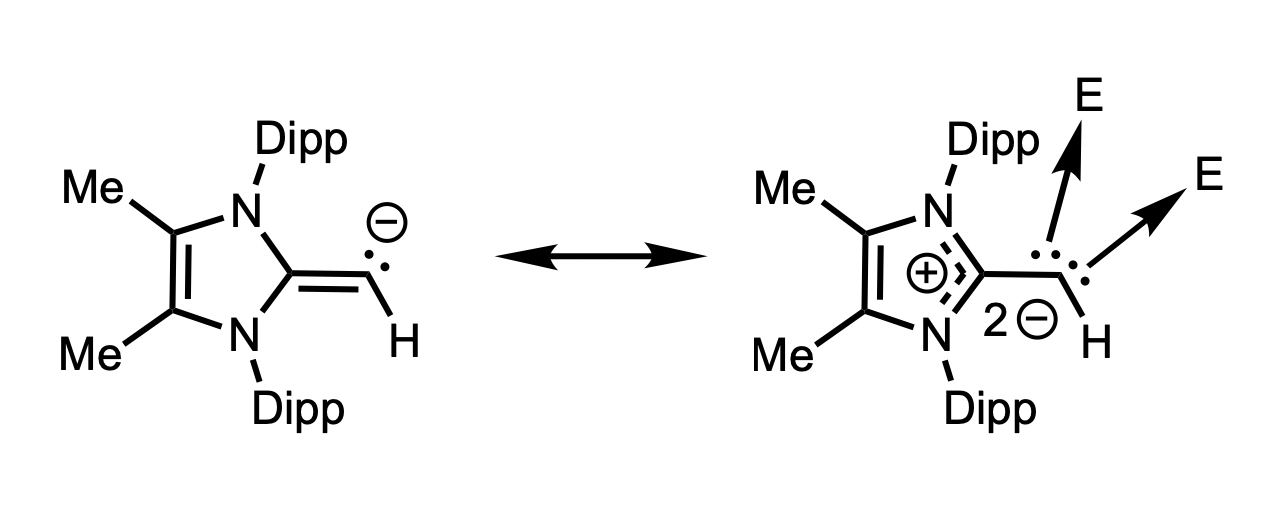
NHOs can act as anionic, four-electron bridging ligands for main group hydrides, where E = Ge, Sn.

==== Transition metals ====
For transition metals, NHOs bind to the metal center at the C_{exo} position. Once bound, the C_{exo} becomes sp^{3} -hybridized. The NHO gains a positive charge that is resonance-stabilized, and the metal center gains electron density and is negatively charged. Rivard and coworkers found that based on the IR stretching frequencies of NHO·RhCl(CO)_{2} compounds, NHOs act as almost exclusively strong σ-donors. Although the electron density on the metal center is much larger when bound to an NHO than an NHC, the metal's bond with an NHO is typically weaker than with an NHC because NHOs cannot engage in back-bonding. Some NHO transition metal complexes include NHOs with Rh and Au.

=== Polymerization ===
NHOs are used as polymerization catalysts for both organopolymerization and Lewis-pair polymerization. In the latter, the NHOs act as Lewis bases in the presence of metal Lewis acids, creating a Lewis-pairs that improve polymerization.

==== Polymerization of lactones ====
NHOs have been able to polymerize lactones in the absence of metals. Qinggang Wang, Kai Guo, and coworkers used NHOs and thioureas to do the ring-opening polymerization of δ-valerolactone. Stefan Naumann, Andrew Dove, and coworker found that while NHOs have the ability to polymerize, there are some limitations in control. When using an unsaturated NHO without any substituents on C_{exo} and an initiator BnOH, the mechanism proceeded via a zwiterrionic intermediate that terminated the polymerization. When a dimethyl group was added to C_{exo}, the reaction no longer proceeds this way, and was able to polymerize lactide, δ-valerolactone, and ω-pentadecalactone. While this broadened the scope and speed of the polymerization, the reaction was difficult to control due to the formation of an enolate intermediate.

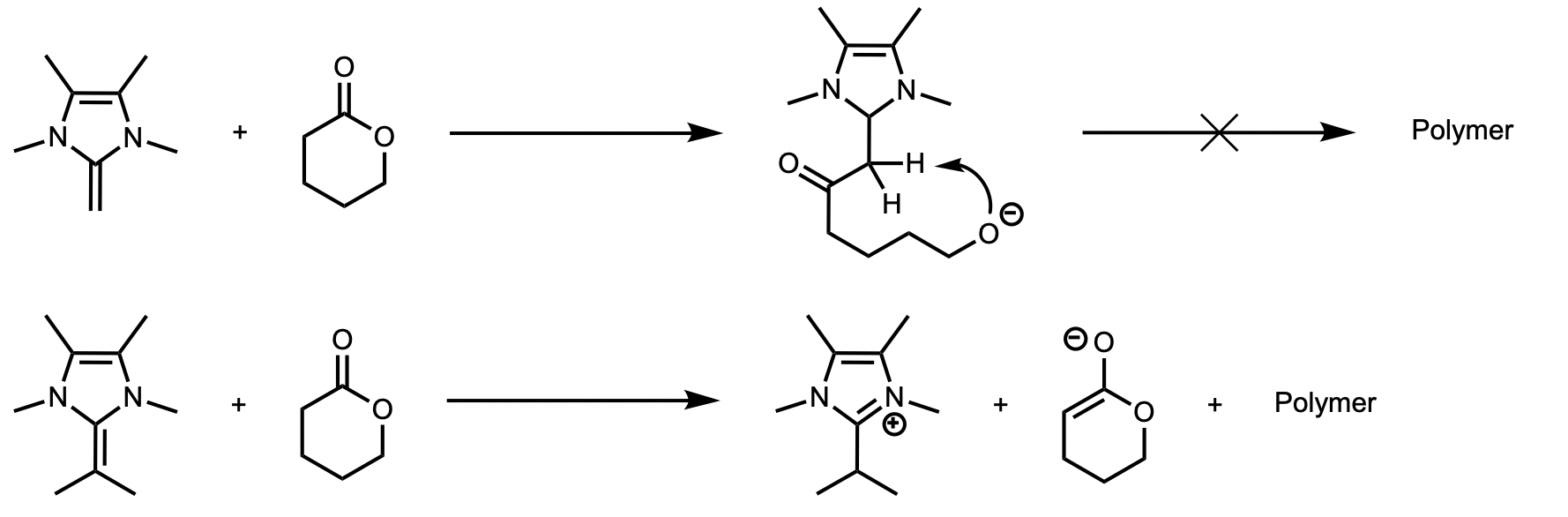
Lactone polymerization cannot occur with the unsubstituted NHO (top), but can through the substituted NHO (bottom).

When metal Lewis acids, like MgCl_{2}, are introduced in the presence of dimethyl-substituted NHOs and lactones, there is improved control of the polymerization. The Lewis acid coordinates to the lactone, while the NHO coordinates to the proton of the initiator, typically BnOH, facilitating the formation of polyesters.

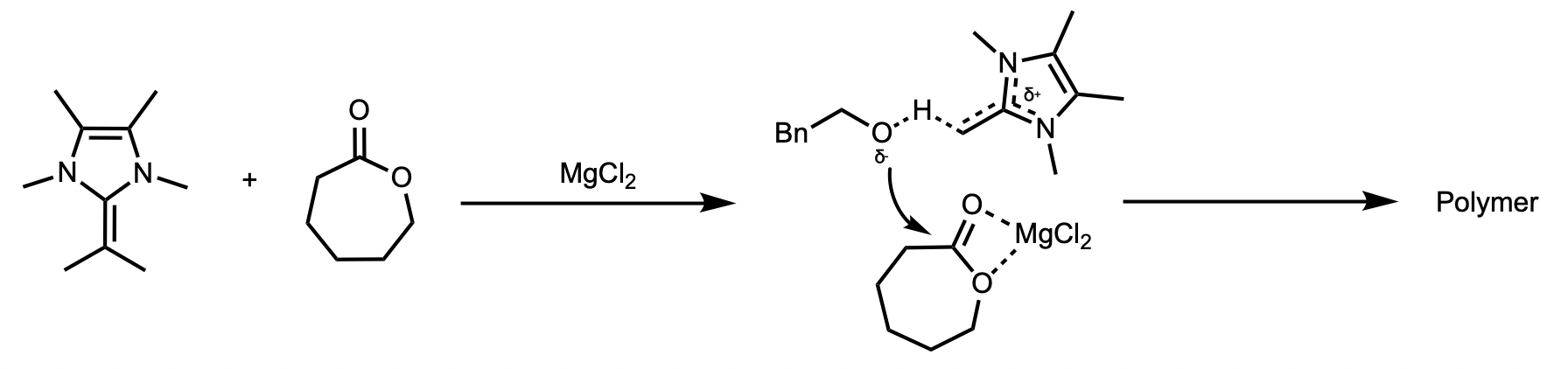
Lactone polymerization can be improved with metal Lewis acids.

==== Polymerization of propylene oxides ====
NHOs are also able to polymerize propylene oxides (PO) to form poly(propylene oxide). Naumann, Dove, and coworker found that in the presence of BnOH as an initiator, unsubstituted C_{exo} and unsaturated NHOs can react with PO under two pathways: a major anionic pathway and a minor zwitterionic pathway. Substituting C_{exo} with a dimethyl group created steric hindrance that made the polymerization go through the anionic pathway exclusively.

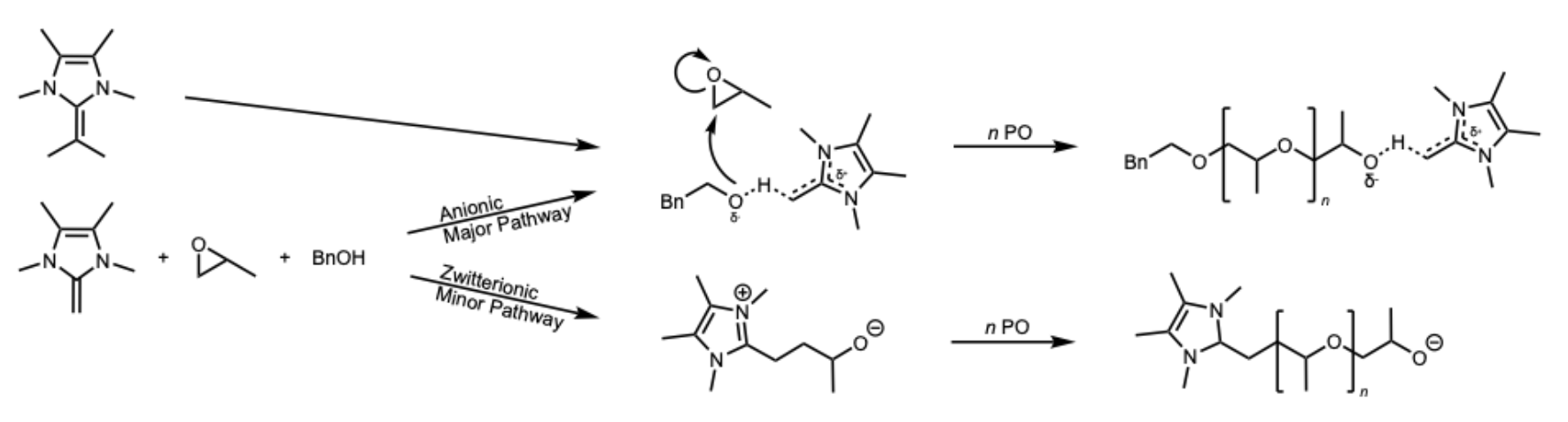
NHOs can polymerize PO to form polyethers. For an unsubstituted NHO, there is a major anionic mechanism and a minor zwitterionic mechanism. Substituted NHOs only polymerize via the anionic pathway.

When Mg(HMDS)_{2} is added, the polymerization occurs exclusively through the zwitterionic pathway with high molar mass.

==== Polymerization of acrylates ====
NHOs can polymerize acrylates best in the presence of a Lewis acid. Xiao-Bing Lu and coworkers were able to polymerize acrylates, such as MMA, BMA, DMAA, and DPAA, by creating a frustrated Lewis pair (FLP) between NHOs and Al(C_{6}F_{5})_{3}. While a lactone product can form from a backbiting side reaction and terminate the polymerization, this a much slower reaction than the polymerization.

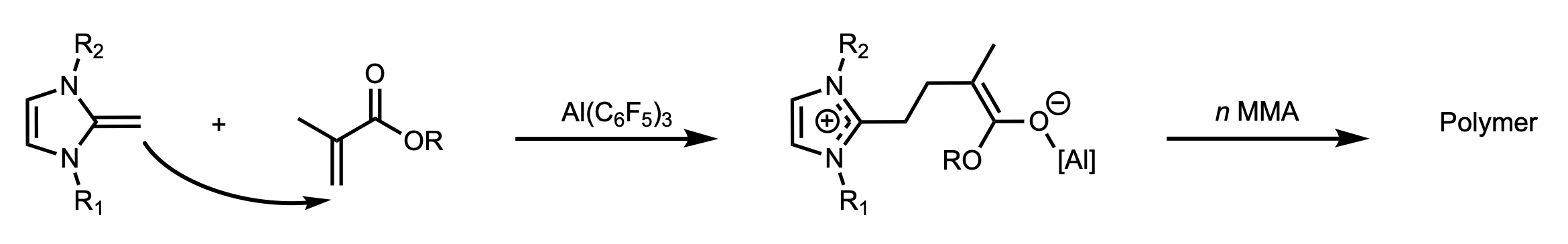
Lu and coworkers created a frustrated Lewis pair adduct with NHO to polymerize MMA.

Yuetao Zhang, Eugene Chen et al. developed a living polymerization of methacrylates using the Lewis acid MeAl(BHT)_{2} instead of Al(C_{6}F_{5})_{3}. MeAl(BHT)_{2} creates a non-interacting FLP with NHO and thereby eliminates the backbiting side reaction. Naumann and Laura Falivene found that adding LiCl improves the control of the polymerization of acrylamides like DMAA.
