= Propadienone =

Names
- IUPAC name 1,2-Propadien-1-one
- Other names: 1-Allenone; Methylene ketene

Identifiers
CAS Number	61244-93-7
3D model (JSmol)	Interactive image
ChemSpider	126851
PubChem CID	143780
CompTox Dashboard (EPA)	DTXSID301032867
- InChI: InChI=1S/C3H2O/c1-2-3-4/h1H2 Key: TURAMGVWNUTQKH-UHFFFAOYSA-N
- SMILES: C=C=C=O

Properties
Chemical formula	C_{3}H_{2}O
Molar mass	54.048 g·mol^{−1}
- Except where otherwise noted, data are given for materials in their standard state (at 25 °C [77 °F], 100 kPa). Infobox references

Propadienone is an organic compound with the molecular formula H_{2}C=C=C=O. It is the parent compound of the alkylidene ketenes, and the first member of the homologous series of cumulenones H_{2}C=(C=)_{n}C=O.

== Synthesis ==
Propadienone may be generated via flash vacuum pyrolysis of several possible precursors, including acrylic anhydride and 3-diazotetronic acid. While it is only transiently present under standard conditions, it may be captured via matrix isolation in solid argon at 14 K.

== Structure ==
While the ground state of propadienone is planar, it has a nonlinear CCCO backbone, in contrast to cumulenes, as well as heterocumulenes such as carbon suboxide. The barrier to backbone linearization is at least 360 cm^{−1}, much larger than the higher cumulenones H_{2}C=(C=)_{2}C=O and H_{2}C=(C=)_{3}C=O, which are predicted to also be bent but with very small barriers to linearization (<30 cm^{−1}).

Its C1 bond angle (C–C–O) is 166–173° and its C2 bond angle (C–C–C) is 142–144°, bending in opposite directions to each other in a zigzag geometry. The large deviation of the C2 bond angle from linearity is attributable to H_{2}C=C^{−}−C≡O^{+} being a major resonance contributor, making propadienone a 1,3-dipole, a property that is shared by the higher cumulenones. Its dipole moment is 2.3 D.

Propadienone is isoelectronic to diazoethene (H_{2}C=C=N^{+}=N^{−}), which is predicted to also be bent.

== Reactions ==
Exposure of matrix-isolated propadienone to UV light of wavelength 230 ± 10 nm leads to its photodissociation into acetylene and carbon monoxide via a postulated methylidenecarbene intermediate. The same decarbonylation reaction occurs during vacuum pyrolysis at temperatures at or above 570 °C.

Warming matrix-isolated propadienone yields a white insoluble polymer of unknown composition. The same polymer is also obtainable from direct low-temperature condensation of the undiluted pyrolysis gas stream.
