= Horst Böhme (chemist) =

German chemist (1908–1996)

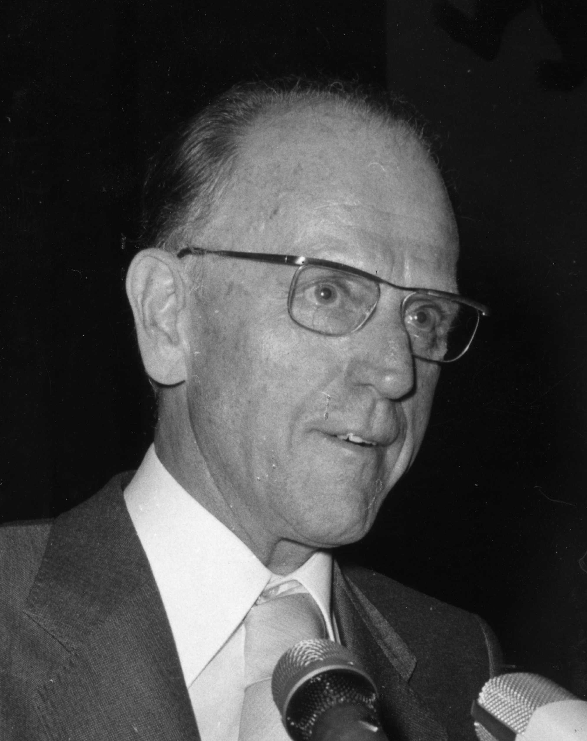
Horst Böhme

Horst Böhme, born Johann Friedrich Horst Böhme (30 May 1908 in Bernau bei Berlin – 27 July 1996 in Arolsen) was a German chemist. He became an expert on mustard gas. From 1943 he worked at the Kaiser Wilhelm Institute for Physical Chemistry and Electrochemistry at Berlin-Dahlem. After World War II, he became a professor of chemistry and a rector of the University of Marburg.

== Literature ==
- Horst Böhme: Lehr- und Entwicklungsjahre eines Pharmazeuten in Berlin und München, (2 Teile), Deutsche Apotheker-Zeitung, 1989, 129, 2707–2712 und 2832–2840.
- Christoph Friedrich: Wissenschaftliche Schulen und die Marburger Pharmazie, Pharmazeutische Zeitung 2001, 146, 2410–2418.
- Klaus Hartke: Professor Dr. Dr. h. c. H. Böhme, Marburg, 65 Jahre, Deutsche Apotheker-Zeitung 1973, 113, 811.
- Gunther Seitz: Professor Dr. Dr. h.c. Horst Böhme, Marburg, zum 70. Geburtstag Pharmazeutische Zeitung 1978, 123, 948.
- Bernhard Unterhalt: Horst Böhme 75 Jahre, Deutsche Apotheker-Zeitung 1983, 123, 1031–1034 (mit Bibliographie).
- Christoph Friedrich: Horst Böhme – ein bedeutender pharmazeutischer Chemiker, Pharmazeutische Zeitung 2008, 153, 88−90.
