= Ketenyl anion =

A ketenyl anion contains a C=C=O allene-like functional group, similar to ketene, with a negative charge on either terminal carbon or oxygen atom, forming resonance structures by moving a lone pair of electrons on C-C-O bond. Ketenes have been sources for many organic compounds with its reactivity despite a challenge to isolate them as crystal. Precedent method to obtain this product has been at gas phase or at reactive intermediate, and synthesis of ketene is used be done in extreme conditions (i.e., high temperature, low pressure). Recently found stabilized ketenyl anions become easier to prepare compared to precedent synthetic procedure. A major feature about stabilized ketene is that it can be prepared from carbon monoxide (CO) reacting with main-group starting materials such as ylides, silylene, and phosphinidene to synthesize and isolate for further steps. As CO becomes a more common carbon source for various type of synthesis, this recent finding about stabilizing ketene with main-group elements opens a variety of synthetic routes to target desired products.

== Synthesis ==
Gessner et al. first revealed a synthetic route for stabilized ketenyl anion using metalated ylides in 2022. In their paper, upon introducing CO, metalated ylide with potassium cation exchange CO with phosphine group R, also known for carbonylation of ylide. Their isolated ketenyl anion [K(PPh_{2}(=S)CCO] is stable solid for a week under inert atmosphere, and its crystal structure was characterized. An alternate synthetic pathway for synthesizing ketenyl anion from ylide, shown in Figure 2, includes sulfuration on diphenylphosphine group, deprotonation on carbon center, and CO substitution in exchange of triphenylphosphine leaving. This synthesis resulted in 88% isolation of the product. Later in their studies, the ketenyl anion product upon carbonylation can be selective by changing electron-withdrawing ability on a certain leaving group and Lewis acidity of coordinated alkali metal cation. In their example with ylide containing phosphine group and tosyl group (Ts), Gessner et al. was able to produce the ketenyl anion product more selective by modifying those parameters, shown in Figure 2. As R group is more electron-withdrawing group, it becomes more likely to leave than tosyl group. For example, changing R group from cyclohexyl group (Cy) to phenyl group (Ph) favored the ketenyl anion product with R_{1} group leaving by 76%. This is because phenyl group is less electron rich and less nucleophilic compared to cyclohexyl group, resulting in more stable by itself. For alkali metal cation trend, when triphenylphosphine group is present, changing from M = Li to M = K favored in phosphine group leaving by 9%. Although it is a small effect compared to leaving group effect, this is due to Lewis acidity on metal cations because a stronger Lewis acidic metal cation (Li > K in Lewis acidity) attracts tosyl group to interact, resulting in increasing leaving group ability.

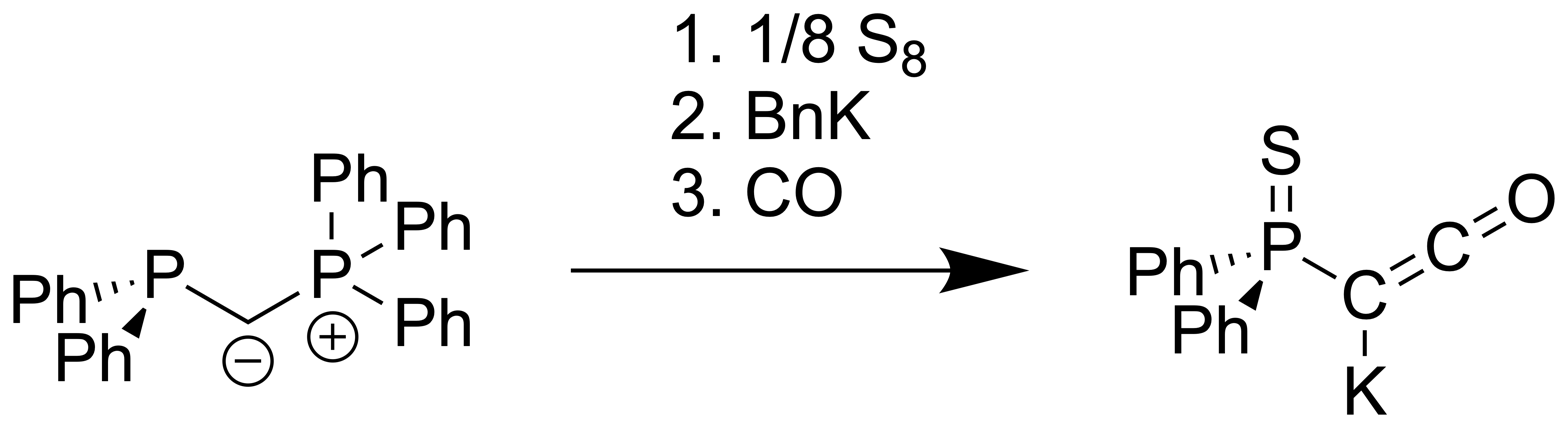
Figure 1. Synthetic scheme of ketenyl anion from ylide upon sulfuration, deprotonation, and carbonylation in order. 88 % yield was reported in this reaction.

Figure 2: Synthesis of ketenyl anion from CO carbonylation of ylide, reference from Gessner et al.. M = Li, Na, K. R_{1} = Cy, Ph, p-(CF_{3})C_{6}H_{4}.

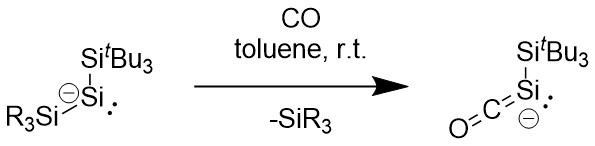
Figure 3: Synthesis of ketenyl anion using silylene molecules stabilized by silyl group. R = SiMe_{3}, Si^{t}Bu_{3}. Charge of both starting materials and product is balanced by cation [K(18-6-crown)]^{+}.

Inoue et al. presented synthetic route of stabilizing ketene via silica-carbonyl anion, silicon analogue of ketene. They motivated this goals from recent reactivity study of silylene and disilane activating CO and isolating intermediate, hypothesizing that silica-ketenyl anion is also capable to stabilize ketene. While Gessner et al. uses ylides to accept CO, Inoue et al. uses silylene anion with another silyl group substituted to afford insertion of CO or carbonylation at room temperature in exchange of silyl group.

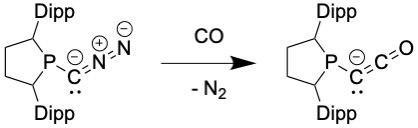
Figure 4: Synthesis of ketenyl anion from CO carbonylation of phosphinidene-carbone.

Liu et al. had another approach to stabilize and isolate ketene by using carbene coordinated by phosphinidene. Carbene coordinated by 2,6-diisopropylphenyl(Dipp)-substituted phosphinidene and dinitrogen (N_{2}) perform N_{2}/CO ligand exchange. The starting material is similar to N-heterocyclic carbene with bulky substituents, invented by Bertrand. In their studies, this reaction is concerted and thermodynamically favorable (-47.4 kcal/mol relative to N_{2}-coordinated carbene) on coordinating CO ligand to NHC. This product is stable at room temperature inert atmosphere for a month, and no decomposition while heating in THF at 80 °C for 12 hours was observed.

== Structure ==
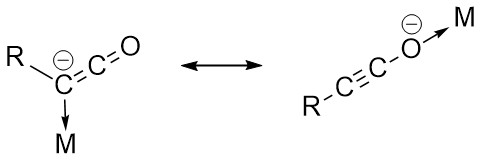
Figure 5: General resonance structure of ketenyl anion. Left structure is ketene form while right structure is ynolate form.

As shown in Figure 5, ketenyl anion has two major resonance structures: ketenyl form and ynolate form. Due to the resonance structures, alkali metal cations can be coordinated to either at central carbon atom or terminal oxygen atom depending on its electronic structure. A series of structural analysis revealed both ketene and ynolate structures evenly contribute to the overall electronic structure of ketenyl anion.

From an example in Gessner's paper, the crystal structure of the ketenyl anion K[PPh_{2}(=S)CCO] had the bond length of C-C bond (1.245 Å) and C-O bond (1.215 Å). By comparing these bond length with Pyykkő's analysis on bond, C-C bond is in between double bond and triple bond whereas C-O bond is in between single bond and double bond. In natural bond orbital (NBO) analysis, Wiberg bond index is found to be 2.06 and 1.72 for C-C bond and C-O bond, respectively. These values also suggests that both double and triple bond character for C-C bond (range of 1.20 - 1.34 Å) and both single bond and double bond character for C-O bond (range of 1.24 - 1.38 Å). The characteristic of allene-like (C=C=C) structure is also applied other ketenyl anion compounds so far. Inoue's silica-ketenyl anion product, shown in Figure 3, had Wiberg bond index of 1.68 and 1.76 for Si-C bond and C-O bond, respectively. Their bond indices demonstrate that both Si-C and C-O bonds have part of double bond character that contributes of Si=C=O structure.

This ketenyl anion can dimerize in solid state as oxygen atoms interacts with alkali metal cation. This dimer can be broken up by adding M(18-crown-6) (where M = alkali metal cation), resulting in isolation of single ketenyl anion structure. Intrinsic bond orbitals (IBO) of the molecule [K(PPh_{2}(=S)CCO] reveal molecular orbital describing π-orbital of C-C and C-O and delocalized orbital on oxygen atom.

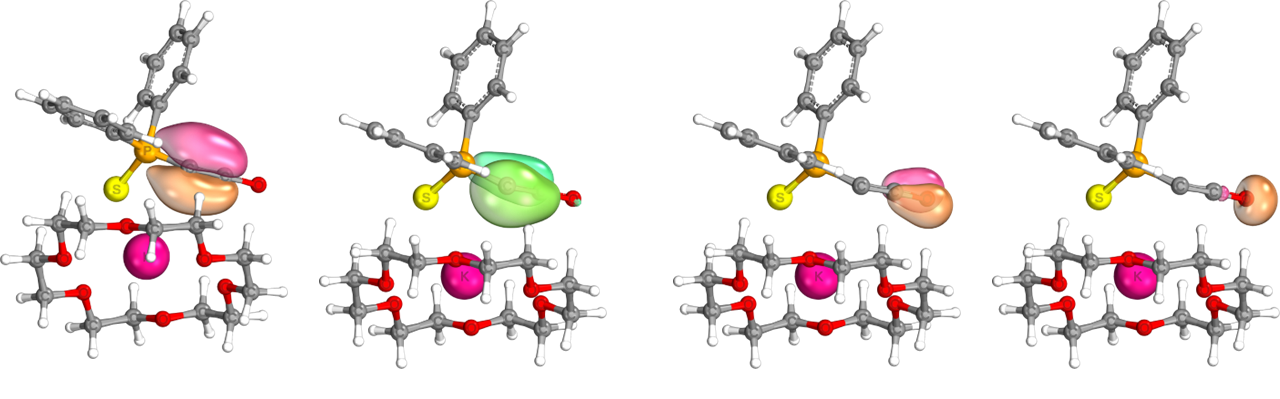
Figure 6: Intrinsic bond orbitals of K[PPh2(=S)CCO] (CCDC-2201261), calculating by ORCA def2-TZVP basis set. The geometry of the structure was optimized by r^{2}SCAN3c method.

The stability of ketenyl anion is come from the decrease of charge on ketene carbon from parent ketene to ketenyl anion. In Gessner's study, parent ketenyl anion [H-C=C=O]^{−} has smaller positive charge (+4.0 e) on C compared to parent ketene [H_{2}C=C=O] (+7.0 e on C). This drops of charge makes the ketene less amphiphilic, leading to a more stable compound.

== Reactivity ==
The advantage of using ketenyl anion molecule is to synthesize desired compound selectively without concerning dimerization before synthesizing a target product. In ylide-ketenyl anion, electrophile can be substituted in exchange of metal to functionalize the ketene moiety at high yield. Since the central carbon is negatively charged, this nucleophilicity enable substitution with a series of electrophilic compounds such as triphenylmethyl group. Some ketenyl anion can further react with other compounds to form a new functional group. For example, after electrophilic substitution of ketenyl anion with triphenylmethyl group, the treatment with water results in formation of carboxylic acid at C=O moiety. Reported compounds from Gessner et al. had more than 90% yield isolated as solid.

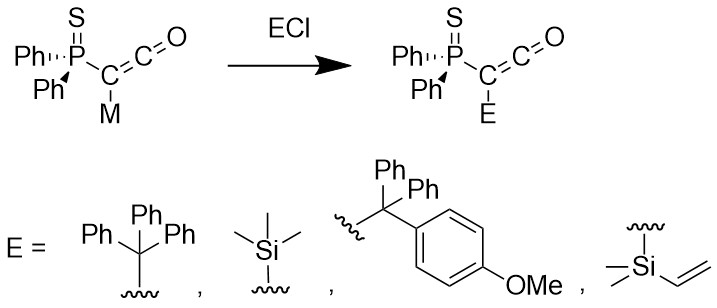
Figure 7: Electrophilic substitution of ketenyl anion with a series of substrate, reported in Gessner et al.

Not only at the central carbon where a cation can be coordinated, other carbon atom and terminal oxygen atom can also be functionalized upon electrophilic substitution. This reactivity allows activation of chemical bonds such as S-S and C=O bonds and new bonds C-S bond and C=C bond. These products requires CO and substrates of interests, which highlight new synthetic pathways of organic compounds at room temperature instead of extreme conditions such as pyrolysis.

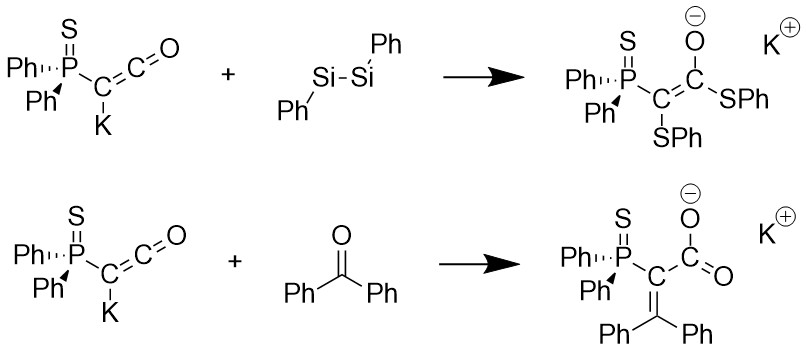
Figure 8: Reported reactivity studies on S-S and C=O bond activation by ylide-ketenyl anion by Gessner et al.

A stabilized ketenyl anion also undergoes dimerization with disubstituted phosphine compound to form a heterocyclic product. In this reaction, an intermediate is proposed to be electrophilic substitution of a disubstituted phosphine compound followed by dimerization.

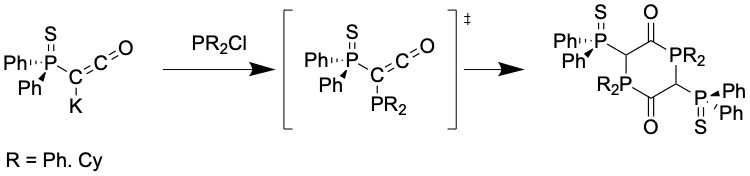
Figure 9: Reported dimerization of ylide-ketenyl anion upon electrophilic substitution of disubstituted phosphines by Gessner et al.

In different ketenyl anion compound, cleavage of C_{sp}-H bond, C=N bond, and I_{2} bond at room temperature were also reported in phosphinidene-stabilized ketene. For I_{2} cleaving reaction, the mechanism is proposed to be cleavage of the bond at central carbon and migration of I to phosphorus atom.

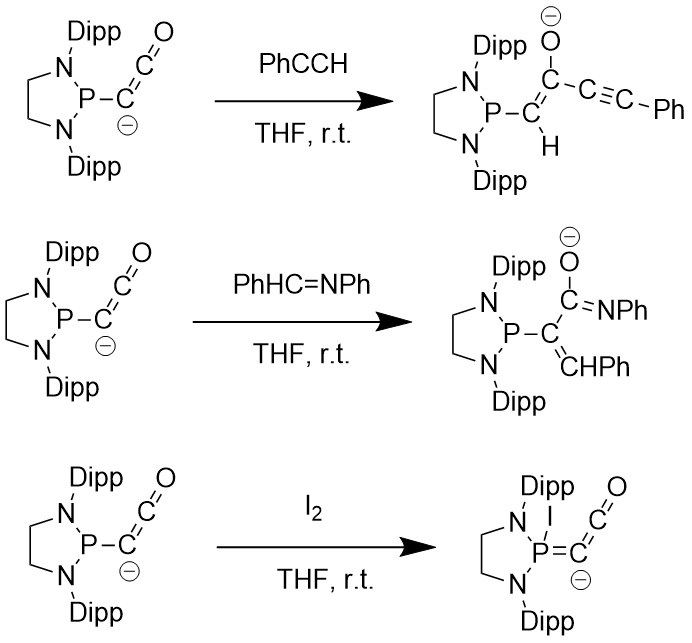
Figure 10: Reported bond cleavage reactions with phosphinidene-ketenyl anion. Charge of both starting materials and product is balanced by cation [K(18-6-crown)]^{+}.
